= Ellenborough Park =

Elenborough Park may refer to:

- Ellenborough Park, Weston-super-Mare, Somerset, England
- Ellenborough Park Hotel, in Gloucestershire, England

== See also ==
- Re Ellenborough Park, a 1955 English land law case
- Ellenborough (disambiguation)
