= Richard Law, 8th Baron Ellenborough =

The Right Honourable The Lord Ellenborough
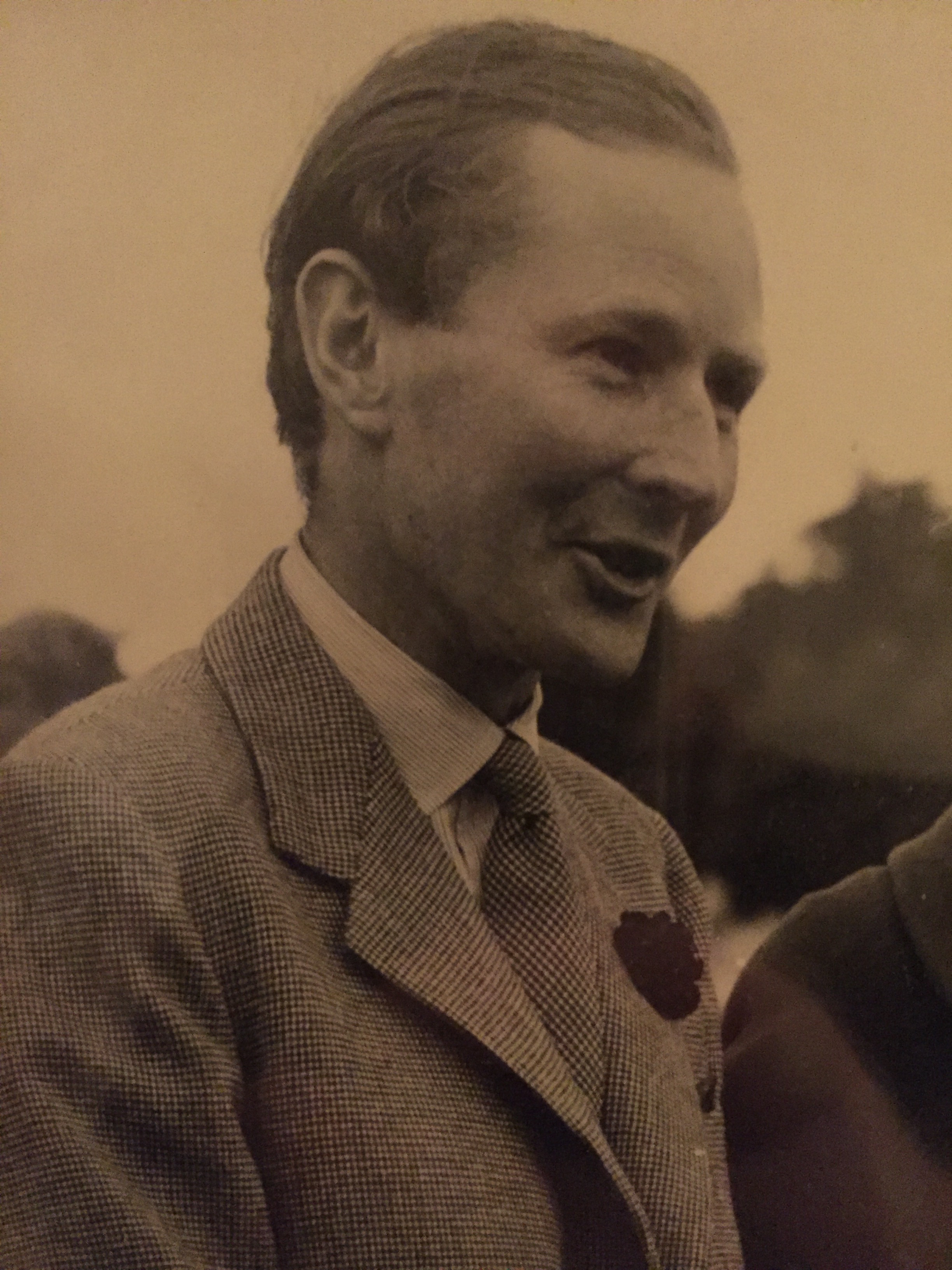

Member of the House of Lords
- Lord Temporal
- as a hereditary peer 19 May 1945 – 11 November 1999
- Preceded by: The 7th Baron Ellenborough
- Succeeded by: Seat abolished (Note: Pursuant to the House of Lords Act 1999.)

Personal details
- Born: Richard Edward Cecil Law; 14 January 1926
- Died: 7 June 2013 (aged 87)
- Political party: Conservative
- Spouse: Rachel Mary Hedley (m. 1953)
- Children: Rupert Law, 9th Baron Ellenborough; Hon. Edmund Law; Hon. Charles Law
- Parents: Henry Law, 7th Baron Ellenborough; Helen Dorothy Lovatt

Richard Edward Cecil Law, 8th Baron Ellenborough (14 January 1926 – 7 June 2013), was hereditary peer and a member of the House of Lords.

Law was educated at Eton College. He became Lord Ellenborough and entered the House of Lords upon the death of his father Henry Law, 7th Baron Ellenborough, in 1945, at the young age of 19. He attended the House of Lords regularly, sitting as a Conservative peer, until 1999.

He was a director of Towry Law Group between 1958 and 1994 and President of the National Union of Ratepayers Association between 1960 and 1990.

Law married Rachel Mary Hedley in 1953. They had three sons:

- Rupert Edward Henry Law, 9th Baron Ellenborough (born 1955)
- Hon. Edmund Ivor Cecil Law (born 1956)
- Hon. Charles Adrian Christian Towry Law (born 1960)

Lord Ellenborough died in 2013.

== Ancestry ==
Ancestors of Richard Law, 8th Baron Ellenborough

8. Hon. Henry Spencer Law (1802–1885)
4. Cecil Law, 6th Baron Ellenborough
9. Dorothea Rochfort (died 1871)
2. Henry Law, 7th Baron Ellenborough
10. John Harvey Astell
5. Alice Astell (died 1916)
1. Richard Law, 8th Baron Ellenborough
6. Harry Lovatt
3. Helen Lovatt (c. 1901 – 2002)

== Arms ==
Coat of arms of the Barons Ellenborough
Crest A cock gules charged on the breast with a mitre pendant from a chain round the neck or. Escutcheon Ermine on a bend engrailed between two cocks gules three mullets pierced or. Supporters Two eagles, wings elevated, sable, each gorged with a chain or, and pendant therefrom on the brest of the dexter supporter a mitre, and on the sinister a covered cup gold. Motto Compositum Jus Fasque Animi (Law and equity combined)

== Notes ==
Peerage of the United Kingdom
Preceded by Henry Law	Baron Ellenborough; 1945–2013; Member of the House of Lords (1945–1999)	Succeeded by Rupert Law
