= Charles Law =

Charles Law may refer to:

- Charles's law, also known as the law of volumes, experimental gas law which describes how gases tend to expand when heated
- Charles Law (British politician) (1792–1850), British judge and Conservative Party MP
- Charles B. Law (1872–1929), United States Representative from New York

== See also ==
- Charles Towry-Law, 3rd Baron Ellenborough (1820–1890), son of the politician above
- Charles Towry-Law, 4th Baron Ellenborough (1856–1902), son of the 3rd Baron
