= Ellenborough =

Ellenborough may refer to:

- Ellenborough, Cumbria, England
- Ellenborough, New South Wales, Australia
- Baron Ellenborough of Ellenborough in the County of Cumberland, a title in the Peerage of the United Kingdom

== See also ==
- Ellenborough Park (disambiguation)
