= Cecil Law, 6th Baron Ellenborough =

British army officer

Colonel The Right Honourable The Lord Ellenborough CB DL
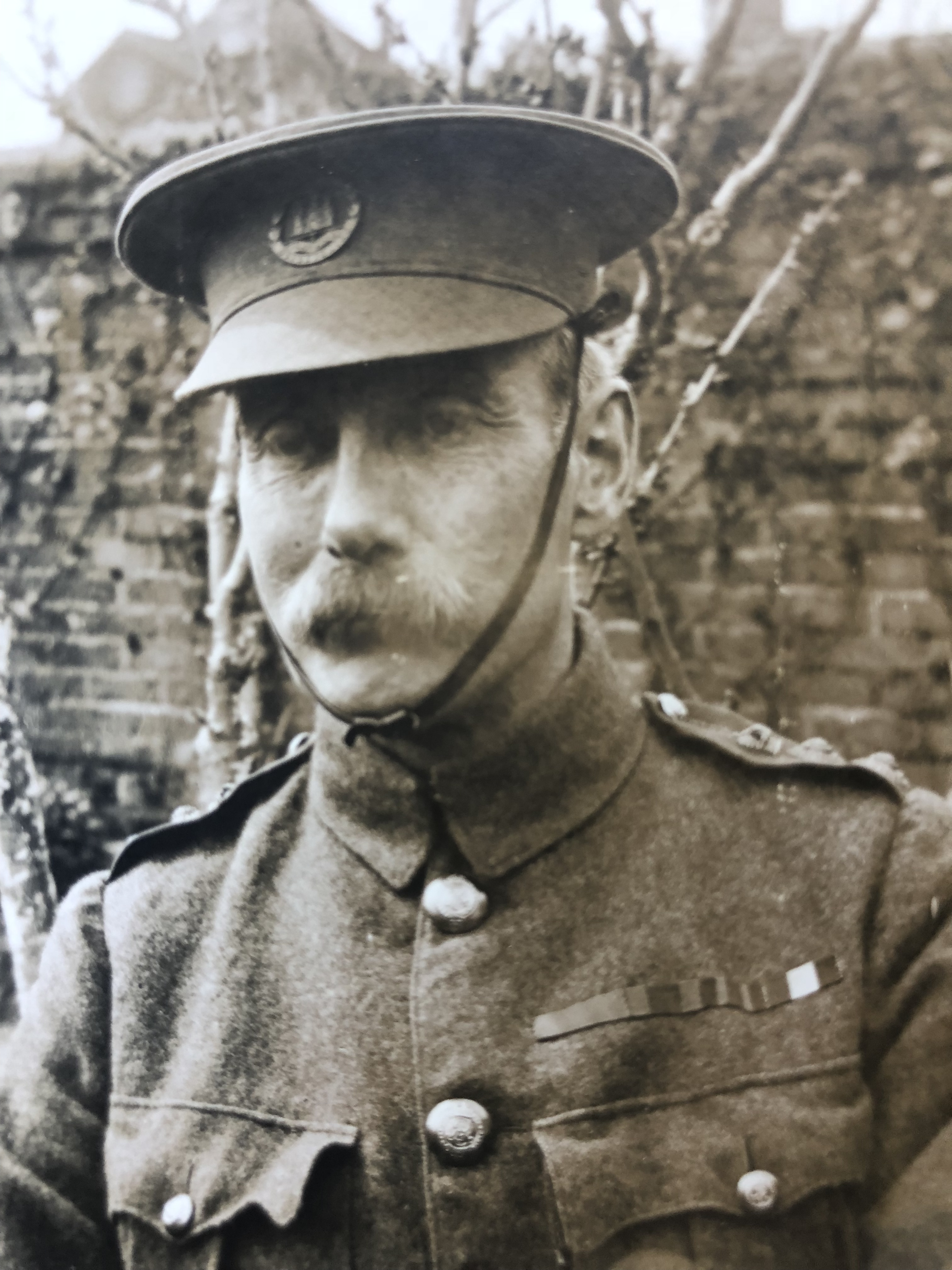
- Law as lieutenant colonel in 1905

Member of the House of Lords
- Lord Temporal
- as a hereditary peer 9 December 1915 – 22 January 1931
- Preceded by: The 5th Baron Ellenborough
- Succeeded by: The 7th Baron Ellenborough

Personal details
- Born: 23 November 1849
- Died: 22 January 1931 (aged 81)
- Parents: Hon. Henry Spencer Law; Dorothea Anne Rochfort
- Education: Wellington College, Berkshire
- Alma mater: RMC Sandhurst
- Profession: Military officer, peer and politician

Military service
- Years of service: 1869–1906
- Rank: Colonel

Colonel Cecil Henry Law, 6th Baron Ellenborough (23 November 1849 – 22 January 1931), was a British Army officer and a member of the House of Lords.

== Early life ==
Law was the third son of the Hon. Henry Spencer Law, a barrister who was the third son of the 1st Baron Ellenborough, and Dorothea Rochfort (daughter of Colonel J. S. Rochfort of Clogrenane, County Carlow). He was a nephew of Edward Law, 1st Earl of Ellenborough, and of Charles Law, a judge and Conservative Party politician.

He was educated at Wellington College, Berkshire, and the Royal Military College, Sandhurst, and passed out into the Army in 1869.

== Military career ==
Law was commissioned as an officer into the 54th Regiment of Foot (from 1881 the Dorsetshire Regiment) in July 1869, was promoted to lieutenant on 28 October 1871, and served in the Second Anglo-Afghan War 1878–1880. Promoted to captain on 24 January 1883, to major on 21 June 1890, and to lieutenant colonel on 19 November 1897, he commanded the 2nd battalion Dorsetshire Regiment during the Second Boer War in South Africa from 1900 to 1902 where he was present during the Relief of Ladysmith, and the battles of Laing's Nek and the Tugela Heights.

For his services in the war, he was mentioned in despatches three times, received the Queen's Medal with five clasps and the King's Medal with two clasps, and was appointed a Companion of the Order of the Bath (CB) in the April 1901 South Africa Honours list. (Note: The award was dated 29 November 1900; he only received the actual decoration from King Edward VII at Buckingham Palace on 24 October 1902.)

After the end of the war in June 1902, he returned to the United Kingdom in the RMS Dunottar Castle, which arrived at Southampton the following month. Law was placed on half-pay in August 1902, and retired with the rank of colonel in 1906.

== Family and later life ==
After his retirement from the British Army, Law took an active interest in local philanthropic and patriotic institutions. He was for many years Chairman of Dorset County Hospital and President of the Dorset Territorial Army Association. In 1884, he married Alice Caroline Astell, daughter of John Harvey Astell of Woodbury Hall, Bedfordshire. She died in 1916.

Law succeeded to the Ellenborough barony on the death of his brother Edward in 1915. He was introduced to the House of Lords on 15 February 1916, immediately after that year's King's Speech.

On his death in 1931, he was succeeded by his son Henry, who became the 7th Baron Ellenborough.

== Ancestry ==
Ancestors of Cecil Law, 6th Baron Ellenborough

8. Rt Rev. Edmund Law
4. Edward Law, 1st Baron Ellenborough
9. Mary Christian (1721/1722 – 1762)
2. The Hon. Henry Spencer Law (1802–1885)
10. Capt. George Towry
5. Ann Towry (died 1843)
1. Cecil Law, 6th Baron Ellenborough
12. John Rochfort (1735–1812)
6. Col. John Rochfort (died 1844)
13. Dorothea Burgh
3. Dorothea Rochfort (died 1871)
14. Thomas Burgh (died 1810)
7. Mary Burgh (died 1866)
15. Anne Aigion (died 1831)

== Arms ==
Coat of arms of Cecil Law, 6th Baron Ellenborough
Crest A cock gules charged on the breast with a mitre pendant from a chain round the neck or. Escutcheon Ermine on a bend engrailed between two cocks gules three mullets pierced or. Supporters Two eagles, wings elevated, sable, each gorged with a chain or, and pendant therefrom on the brest of the dexter supporter a mitre, and on the sinister a covered cup gold. Motto Compositum Jus Fasque Animi (Law and equity combined) Orders Order of the Bath (Companion, military division - CB)

== Notes and references ==
=== References ===
Peerage of the United Kingdom
Preceded by Edward Law	Baron Ellenborough; 1915–1931; Member of the House of Lords (1915–1931)	Succeeded by Henry Law
