= Henry Law =

Henry Law may refer to:

- Henry Law (priest) (1797–1884), Church of England priest, Dean of Gloucester
- Henry Law, 7th Baron Ellenborough (1889–1945), officer and member of the House of Lords
- Henry Spencer Law (1802–1885), English barrister

== See also ==
- Henry's law, a gas law in physical chemistry formulated by William Henry
