= Charles Towry-Law =

Charles Towry-Law may refer to:

- Charles Towry-Law, 3rd Baron Ellenborough (1820–1890), member of the House of Lords
- Charles Towry-Law, 4th Baron Ellenborough (1856–1902), member of the House of Lords
