= Baron Ellenborough =

Title in the Peerage of the United Kingdom

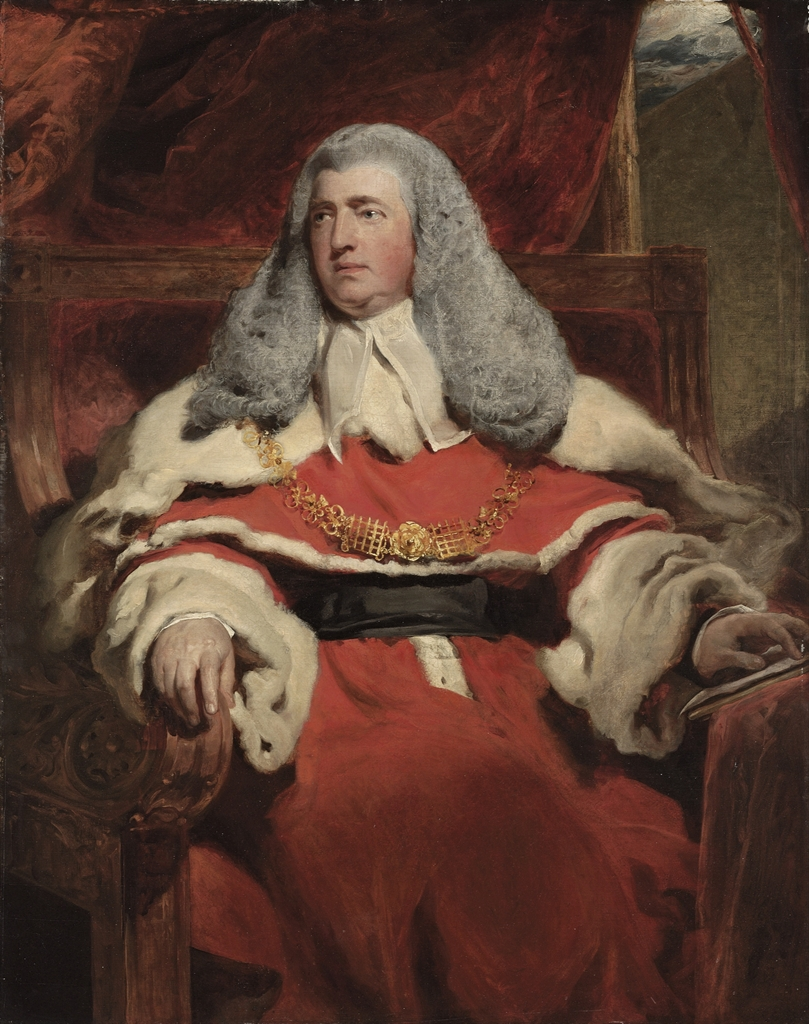
Edward Law, 1st Baron Ellenborough

Baron Ellenborough, of Ellenborough in the County of Cumberland, is a title in the Peerage of the United Kingdom. It was created on 19 April 1802 for the lawyer, judge and politician Sir Edward Law, Lord Chief Justice of the King's Bench from 1802 to 1818. His son, the second Baron, notably served as Governor-General of India. On 22 October 1844 the second Baron was created Viscount Southam, of Southam in the County of Gloucester, and Earl of Ellenborough, in the County of Cumberland. These titles were also in the Peerage of the United Kingdom. His only son predeceased him and on his death in 1871 the viscountcy and earldom became extinct.

However, he was succeeded in the barony by his nephew, the third Baron. He was the son of the Hon. Charles Law, Member of Parliament for Cambridge University, second son of the first Baron. In 1885 he assumed by Royal licence the additional surname of Towry (which was that of his father's mother). On the death of his son, the fourth Baron, this line of the family failed. He was succeeded by his cousin, the fifth Baron. When he died the title passed to his younger brother, the sixth Baron. As of 2016 the title is held by the latter's great-grandson, the ninth Baron, who succeeded his father in 2013.

== Baron Ellenborough (1802) ==
- Edward Law, 1st Baron Ellenborough (1750–1818)
- Edward Law, 2nd Baron Ellenborough (1790–1871) (created Earl of Ellenborough in 1844)

=== Earl of Ellenborough (1844) ===
- Edward Law, 1st Earl of Ellenborough (1790–1871)

=== Baron Ellenborough (1802; reverted) ===
- Charles Edmund Towry-Law, 3rd Baron Ellenborough (1820–1890)
- Charles Towry Hamilton Towry-Law, 4th Baron Ellenborough (1856–1902)
- Edward Downes Law, 5th Baron Ellenborough (1841–1915)
- Cecil Henry Law, 6th Baron Ellenborough (1849–1931)
- Henry Astell Law, 7th Baron Ellenborough (1889–1945)
- Richard Edward Cecil Law, 8th Baron Ellenborough (1926–2013)
- Rupert Edward Henry Law, 9th Baron Ellenborough (born 1955)

The heir apparent is the present holder's son, the Hon. James Rupert Thomas Law (born 1983).
The heir apparent's heir apparent is his son, Edward Thomas Carmichael Law (born 2020).

=== Title succession chart ===
Title succession chart, Barons Ellenborough.

Edward Law; 1st Baron Ellenborough; 1750–1818
Viscount Southam; Earl of Ellenborough
Edward Law; 1st Earl of Ellenborough; 2nd Baron Ellenborough; 1790–1871	Hon. Charles Law; 1792–1850	Hon. Henry Spencer Law; 1802–1885
Viscountcy and earldom extinct
Edward Law; 1819–1838	Charles Towry-Law; 3rd Baron Ellenborough; 1820–1890	Henry Towry-Law; 1830–1855	Edward Law; 5th Baron Ellenborough; 1841–1915	Horatio Law; 1843–1855	Cecil Law; 6th Baron Ellenborough; 1849–1931
Charles Towry-Law; 4th Baron Ellenborough; 1856–1902	Henry Law; 7th Baron Ellenborough; 1889–1945
Richard Law; 8th Baron Ellenborough; 1926–2013
Rupert Law; 9th Baron Ellenborough born 1955
Hon. James Law born 1983
Edward Law born 2020

=== Line of succession ===
Line of succession
- Edward Law, 1st Baron Ellenborough (1750–1818)
  - Edward Law, 1st Earl of Ellenborough (1790–1871)
  - Hon. Charles Ewan Law (1792–1850)
    - Charles Edmund Towry-Law, 3rd Baron Ellenborough (1820–1890)
      - Charles Towry Hamilton Towry-Law, 4th Baron Ellenborough (1856–1902)
  - Hon. Henry Spencer Law (1802–1885)
    - Edward Downes Towry-Law, 5th Baron Ellenborough (1841–1915)
    - Cecil Henry Towry-Law, 6th Baron Ellenborough (1849–1931)
      - Henry Astell Law, 7th Baron Ellenborough (1889–1945)
        - Richard Edward Cecil Law, 8th Baron Ellenborough (1926–2013)
          - Rupert Edward Henry Law, 9th Baron Ellenborough (born 1955)
            - (1) Hon. James Rupert Thomas Law (born 1983)
              - (2) Edward Thomas Carmichael Law (born 2020)
            - (3) Hon. Frederick George Towry Gray Law (born 1990)
          - (4) Hon. Edmund Ivor Cecil Law (born 1956)
            - (5) David Christopher Law (born 1984)
            - (6) John Christian Law (born 1986)
          - (7) Hon. Charles Adrian Christian Towry Law (born 1960)
        - Hon. Cecil Towry Henry Law (1931–2005)
          - (8) Edward Henry Towry Law (born 1971)
  - Hon. William Towry Law (1809–1886)
    - Thomas Graves Law (1836–1904)
      - Henry Duncan Graves Law (1883–1964)
        - Richard Graham Law (1918–2009)
          - (9) Nigel Graham Law (born 1949)
          - (10) David Jocelyn Wright Law (born 1950)
            - (11) Alexander Tasman Law (born 1987)
        - (12) Christopher Law (born 1921)
          - (13) Jonathan Law (born 1958)
          - (14) Ian Graham Law (born 1961)
            - (15) Duncan Graham Law (born 1989)
            - (16) Thomas Henry Law (born 1993)
        - (17) Michael Haldane Law (born 1925)
          - (18) Richard Anthony Law (born 1955)
          - (19) Peter Andrew Law (born 1958)
          - (20) John Martin Law (born 1961)
          - (21) Stephen Francis Law (born 1966)
    - Cdr. Frederick Charles Law (1841–1922)
      - William Victor Law (1880–1867)
        - Frederick Henry Law (1912–1986)
          - (22) Stephen Frederick Law (born 1943)
            - (23) Adrian Crawford Law (born 1979)

=== Arms ===
Coat of arms of the Barons Ellenborough
Crest A cock gules charged on the breast with a mitre pendant from a chain round the neck or. Escutcheon Ermine on a bend engrailed between two cocks gules three mullets pierced or. Supporters Two eagles, wings elevated, sable, each gorged with a chain or, and pendant therefrom on the brest of the dexter supporter a mitre, and on the sinister a covered cup gold. Motto Compositum Jus Fasque Animi (Law and equity combined)
