= Edward Law, 5th Baron Ellenborough =

Commander The Right Honourable The Lord Ellenborough
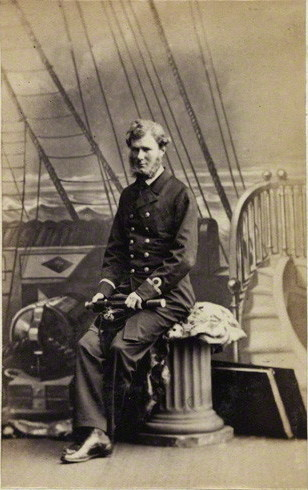
- Edward Downes Law, photographed by Camille Silvy c. 1861

Member of the House of Lords
- Lord Temporal
- as a hereditary peer 29 July 1902 – 9 December 1915
- Preceded by: The 4th Baron Ellenborough
- Succeeded by: The 6th Baron Ellenborough

Personal details
- Born: Edward Downes Law; 9 May 1841
- Died: 9 December 1915 (aged 74)
- Parents: Hon. Henry Spencer Law; Dorothea Anne Rochfort

Military service
- Allegiance: United Kingdom
- Branch/service: Royal Navy
- Rank: Commander

Commander Edward Downes Law, 5th Baron Ellenborough (9 May 1841 – 9 December 1915), was a British Royal Navy officer and member of the House of Lords.

== Early life ==
Law was born on 9 May 1841. He was the son of Hon. Henry Spencer Law and Dorothea Anne Rochfort. His younger brother was Col. Cecil Henry Law, who commanded the 2nd battalion Dorsetshire Regiment during the Second Boer War in South Africa.

His father was the fifth son of Edward Law, 1st Baron Ellenborough, and the former Anne Towry. His mother was the eldest daughter of Col. John Staunton Rochfort, of Clogrennane Castle, and the former Mary Burgh.

Law was educated at Charterhouse and entered the Royal Navy in 1854 aged just 13.

== Career ==
Law was a naval cadet with HMS Colossus, serving in the Baltic during the Crimean War in 1855 and was awarded the Baltic Medal. He became a sub-lieutenant in 1860 and a lieutenant in 1861, and in 1867 he passed as an interpreter in French. During the American Civil War, he was serving on the North America and West Indies Station. He transferred to the frigate HMS Highflyer, and was with her in China during the Second Opium War (1859–1861) and was awarded the Second China War Medal. In 1873, he was lieutenant commanding HMS Coquette, and saw service during the Third Anglo-Ashanti War and was awarded the Ashanti Medal. He retired as commander later in 1873.

=== Peerage ===
Law was the eldest son of Henry Spencer Law and succeeded to the peerage on the death of his cousin, Charles Towry-Law, 4th Baron Ellenborough, in June 1902. He took his seat in the House of Lords on 29 July 1902.

== Personal life ==
On 19 December 1906 in London, Lord Ellenborough married Hermione Octavia Croghan Schenley (c. 1859–1942), a daughter of Mary Elizabeth Croghan and the late Edward Wyndham Harrington Schenley (former MP for Dartmouth), of Pittsburgh, and ward of Andrew Carnegie, and they lived at Windlesham Court in Surrey. Before the marriage, the 66 year old had "long been regarded as a confirmed bachelor."

Lord Ellenborough died in 1915 and was succeeded by his brother Cecil, who became the 6th Baron Ellenborough.

== Ancestry ==
Ancestors of Edward Law, 5th Baron Ellenborough

8. Rt Rev. Edmund Law
4. Edward Law, 1st Baron Ellenborough
9. Mary Christian (1721/1722 – 1762)
2. The Hon. Henry Spencer Law (1802–1885)
10. Capt. George Towry
5. Ann Towry (died 1843)
1. Edward Law, 5th Baron Ellenborough
12. John Rochfort (1735–1812)
6. Col. John Rochfort (died 1844)
13. Dorothea Burgh
3. Dorothea Rochfort (died 1871)
14. Thomas Burgh (died 1810)
7. Mary Burgh (died 1866)
15. Anne Aigion (died 1831)

== Arms ==
Coat of arms of the Barons Ellenborough
Crest A cock gules charged on the breast with a mitre pendant from a chain round the neck or. Escutcheon Ermine on a bend engrailed between two cocks gules three mullets pierced or. Supporters Two eagles, wings elevated, sable, each gorged with a chain or, and pendant therefrom on the brest of the dexter supporter a mitre, and on the sinister a covered cup gold. Motto Compositum Jus Fasque Animi (Law and equity combined)

Peerage of the United Kingdom
Preceded by Charles Towry-Law	Baron Ellenborough; 1902–1915; Member of the House of Lords (1902–1915)	Succeeded by Cecil Law
