= Henry Law, 7th Baron Ellenborough =

British baron and politician

Major The Right Honourable The Lord Ellenborough MC JP DL
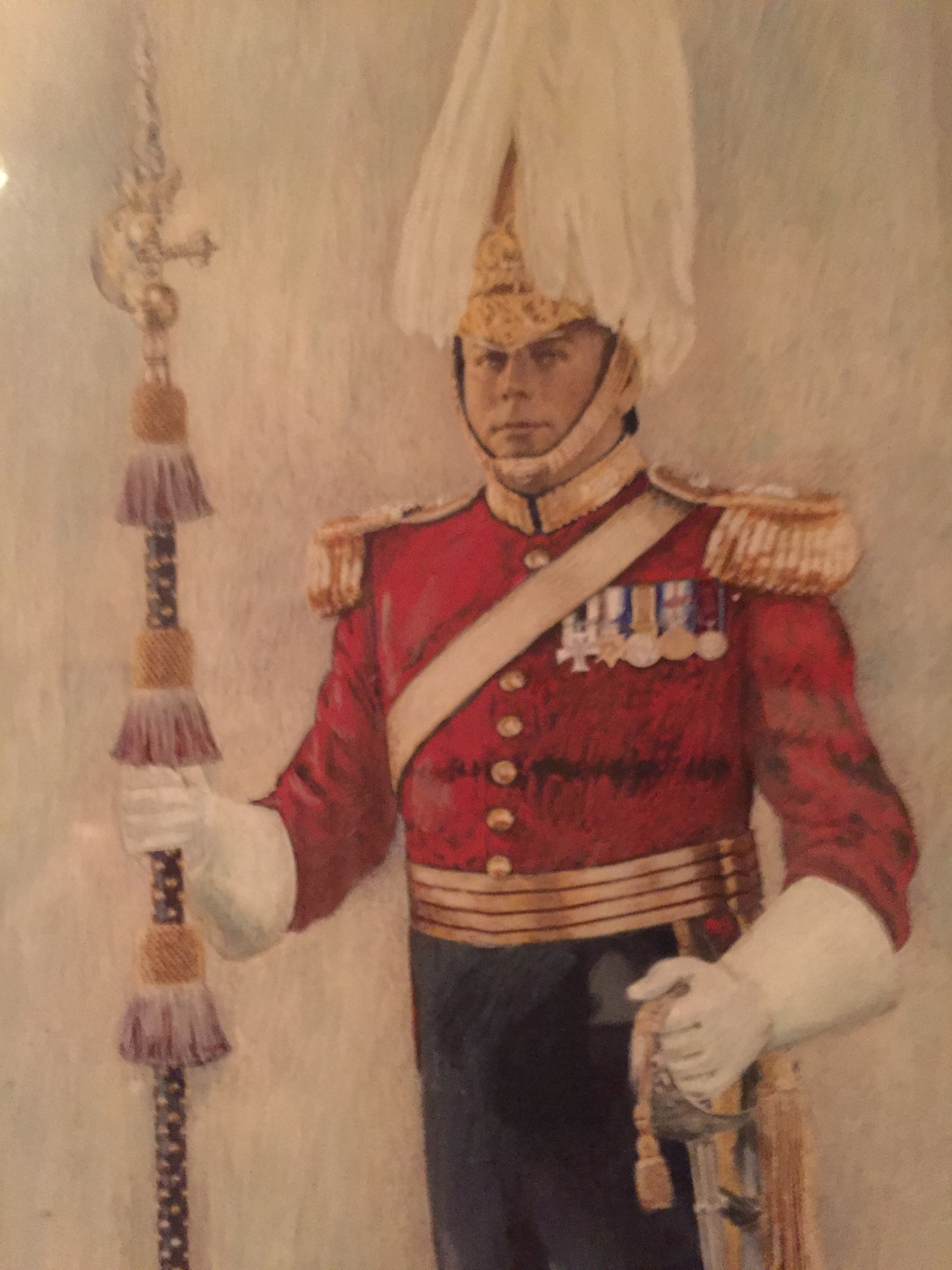
- Portrait, c. 1935

Member of the House of Lords
- Lord Temporal
- In office 22 January 1931 – 19 May 1945 as a hereditary peer
- Preceded by: The 6th Baron Ellenborough
- Succeeded by: The 8th Baron Ellenborough

Personal details
- Born: 11 July 1889
- Died: 19 May 1945 (aged 55)
- Spouse: Helen Dorothy Lovatt
- Children: Richard Law, 8th Baron Ellenborough; Hon. Cecil Law
- Parents: Cecil Law, 6th Baron Ellenborough; Alice Caroline Astell
- Education: Eton College
- Alma mater: RMC Sandhurst
- Profession: Army officer, peer, politician

Military service
- Allegiance: United Kingdom
- Branch: British Army
- Rank: Major
- Unit: King's Own Yorkshire Light Infantry
- Wars: World War I
- Awards: Military Cross

Major Henry Astell Law, 7th Baron Ellenborough (11 July 1889 – 19 May 1945), was a British Army officer, hereditary peer and member of the House of Lords.

== Early life and career ==
Law was educated at Eton College where he was in the Eton Shooting VIII and at Royal Military Academy Sandhurst. He succeeded to the Ellenborough barony on the death of his father, Cecil Law, 6th Baron Ellenborough, in 1931.

He was commissioned as an officer into the King's Own Yorkshire Light Infantry in 1909 and served in World War I. Law was awarded the Military Cross and mentioned in despatches twice for gallantry. He was promoted to the rank of major. He was appointed one of His Majesty's Bodyguard of Honourable Corps of Gentlemen at Arms in 1934 and a Deputy Lieutenant of Dorset. Lord Ellenborough took a prominent part in the local affairs of Dorset and he did good work as Chairman to the Council for the Preservation of Rural England for the county.

== Personal life and death ==
Henry Astell Law married Helen Dorothy Lovatt in 1923, the only daughter of H. W. Lovatt. They had two sons: Richard Edward Cecil Law, 8th Baron Ellenborough (1926–2013), and the Hon. Cecil Towry Henry Law (1931–2005). He died in 1945.

== Ancestry ==
Ancestors of Henry Law, 7th Baron Ellenborough

8. Edward Law, 1st Baron Ellenborough
4. Hon. Henry Spencer Law (1802–1885)
9. Ann Towry (died 1843)
3. Cecil Law, 6th Baron Ellenborough
10. Col. John Rochfort (died 1844)
5. Dorothea Rochfort (died 1871)
11. Mary Burgh (died 1866)
1. Henry Law, 7th Baron Ellenborough
6. John Harvey Astell
3. Alice Astell (died 1916)

== Arms ==
Coat of arms of the Barons Ellenborough
Crest A cock gules charged on the breast with a mitre pendant from a chain round the neck or. Escutcheon Ermine on a bend engrailed between two cocks gules three mullets pierced or. Supporters Two eagles, wings elevated, sable, each gorged with a chain or, and pendant therefrom on the brest of the dexter supporter a mitre, and on the sinister a covered cup gold. Motto Compositum Jus Fasque Animi (Law and equity combined)

Peerage of the United Kingdom
Preceded by Cecil Law	Baron Ellenborough; 1931–1945; Member of the House of Lords (1931–1945)	Succeeded by Richard Law
