= Charles Laws =

Charles Laws may refer to:

- Charles Reed Laws (1894–1985), New Zealand geologist and malacologist
- Charles Henry Laws (1867–1958), his father, New Zealand Methodist minister and administrator

== See also ==
- Charles Law (disambiguation)
