= William Thompson (archdeacon of Cork) =

Archdeacon of Cork

William Thompson (1766–1833) was Archdeacon of Cork from 1800 until his death.

Thompson was born in County Fermanagh and educated at Trinity College, Dublin. He was the incumbent at St Peter, Cork.

He married Mary Chetwode, daughter of the Reverend John Chetwode of Glanmire, County Cork and Elizabeth Hamilton, and sister of the writer Anna Maria Chetwode. They had at least one daughter, Lucy. She married the Reverend John Fitzgerald Day of Beaufort, County Kerry. John was the natural son of Mr Justice Robert Day of the Court of King's Bench (Ireland) and his companion (later his second wife) Mary Fitzgerald of Bandon, County Cork. Lucy and John's daughter Anna married as his second wife Charles Towry-Law, 3rd Baron Ellenborough.
