= William Wilberforce Bird (governor) =

British colonial administrator

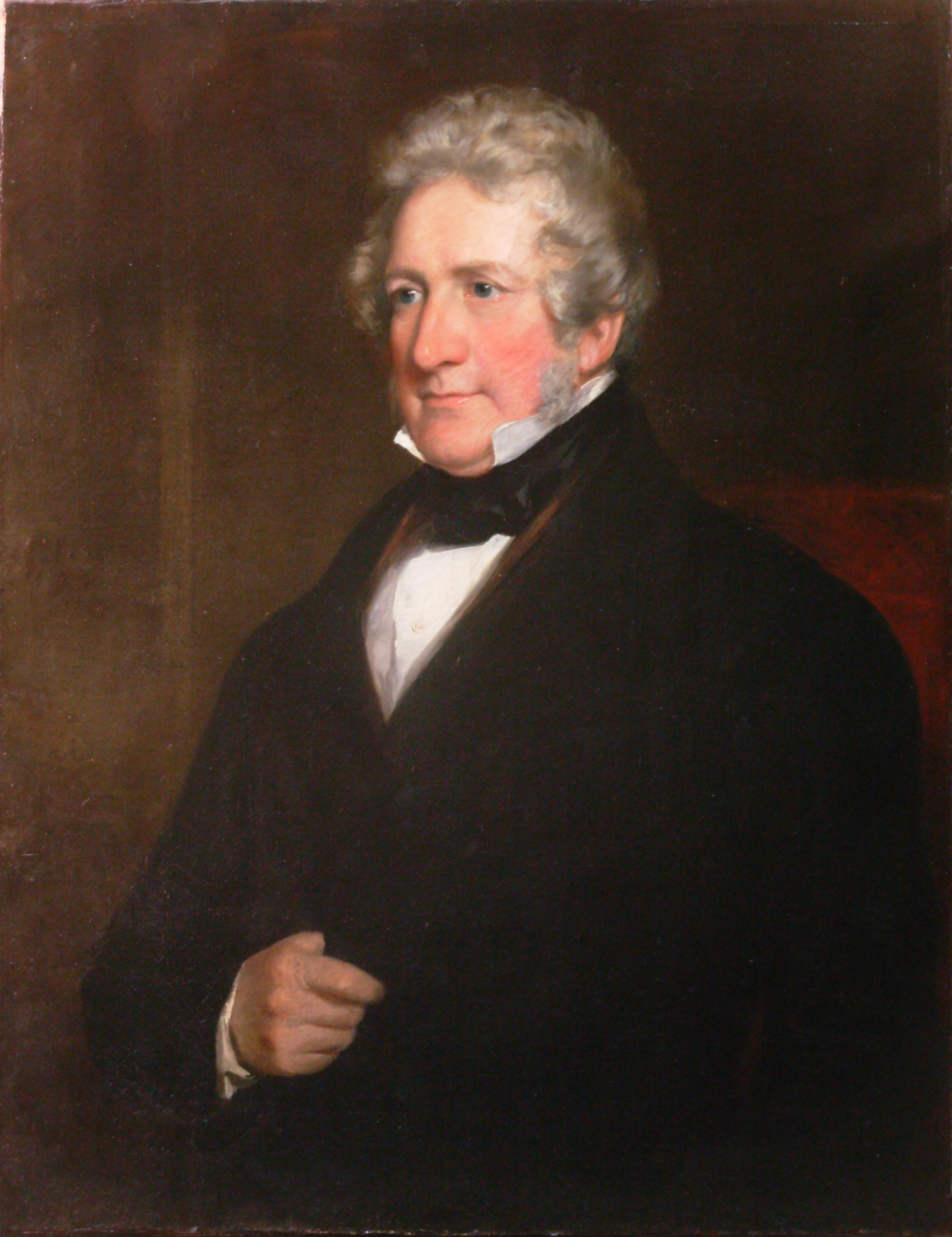
William Wilberforce Bird

William Wilberforce Bird (1784–1857) was a British colonial administrator who served as Deputy-Governor of Bengal Presidency and, in 1844, as the acting Governor General of India.

William Wilberforce Bird had the same name as his father, who was Member of Parliament for Coventry. He was born in 1784 and educated in Warwick and Geneva before being nominated to join the British East India Company in 1802. After training, he arrived in Calcutta in 1803, where he undertook further training at the Fort William College and was then posted to Benares.

Bird conducted himself well in Benares, including on occasions when he had to deal with civil disturbances involving local people. He was involved in both financial and judicial work before being appointed to the Supreme Council of India, of which in due course he became president when the then Governor-General of India was absent. He served as Deputy-Governor of Bengal Presidency throughout the period when Lord Ellenborough was Governor, standing in for him while Ellenborough was engaged in the North-Western Provinces. Bird then replaced Ellenborough as Governor-General of India, acting in that capacity until the arrival of Sir Henry Hardinge from England in 1844. Hardinge reappointed Bird as Deputy-Governor of Bengal Presidency but Bird had retired from service and returned to England by the end of that year. In the same year, until October, he was President of The Asiatic Society.

Bird married Hannah Elizabeth Brown, second daughter of David Brown, in Benares on 11 August 1818. He died at home on 1 June 1857.

In the long-running debate concerning education in India, Bird favoured the secular cause, along with people such as Thomas Macaulay, as opposed to one that desired further to promote a Christian basis for schooling. He said in 1835 that secular education was having good results in India and raised concerns that a Christian approach might upset the native people, potentially leading to what he described as "catastrophes of a very serious description".

Government offices
Preceded by The Earl of Ellenborough	Governor-General of India (acting); 1844	Succeeded by The Viscount Hardinge
