= Charles Towry-Law, 4th Baron Ellenborough =

Charles Towry Hamilton Towry-Law, 4th Baron Ellenborough (21 April 1856 – 26 June 1902), was a member of the House of Lords.

He was the only child of Charles Towry-Law, 3rd Baron Ellenborough, and his second wife, Anne Elizabeth Fitzgerald-Day. His parents were married at Lymington on 28 June 1855, and he was born on 21 April 1856. His mother, who was the granddaughter of Mr Justice Robert Day MP and daughter of Rev. John Robert Fitzgerald-Day of Beaufort, County Kerry, and Lucy Thompson, died suddenly in February 1860 on a ship returning from India.

Charles succeeded his father as 4th Baron Ellenborough in 1890 and died of cardiac failure unmarried at 152 Harley Street, London, on 26 June 1902. He was in turn succeeded by a cousin, Edward Law, 5th Baron Ellenborough.

== Ancestry ==
Ancestors of Charles Towry-Law, 4th Baron Ellenborough

8. Edward Law, 1st Baron Ellenborough
4. The Hon. Charles Law
9. Ann Towry (died 1843)
2. Charles Towry-Law, 3rd Baron Ellenborough
10. Sir Edward Nightingale, 10th Bt.
5. Elizabeth Nightingale (died 1864)
11. Eleanor Nightingale (died 1825)
1. Charles Towry-Law, 4th Baron Ellenborough
6 Rev. John Day
3. Anna Day (died 1860)

== Arms ==
Coat of arms of the Barons Ellenborough
Crest A cock gules charged on the breast with a mitre pendant from a chain round the neck or. Escutcheon Ermine on a bend engrailed between two cocks gules three mullets pierced or. Supporters Two eagles, wings elevated, sable, each gorged with a chain or, and pendant therefrom on the brest of the dexter supporter a mitre, and on the sinister a covered cup gold. Motto Compositum Jus Fasque Animi (Law and equity combined)

Peerage of the United Kingdom
Preceded by Charles Towry-Law	Baron Ellenborough; 1890–1902; Member of the House of Lords (1890–1902)	Succeeded by Edward Law
