= Kinard de la Bere =

Kinard de la Bere (c. 1669–1735) was an English landowner and MP. He was the son of John de la Bere (d. 1696) of Southam, Gloucestershire and Anne, daughter of John Stephens of Lypiatt, Gloucestershire. The various branches of his mother's family frequently represented Gloucestershire in parliament. In 1699 he married Hester, the daughter and co-heiress of John Neale of Nether Dean, Beds. Her sister Anne had married his mother's nephew Thomas Stephens, a Whig MP for Gloucestershire from 1713 until his death in 1720. At the general election in 1722 he was returned to sit for Gloucestershire through the influence of the Stephens. He served only one term and did not stand in the following election. He died childess and his estate was inherited by his nephew William Baghot, who assumed the name De la Bere.
