= Robert Day (Irish politician, born 1746) =

Irish politician, barrister, and judge

Robert Day (1746–1841) was an Irish politician, barrister and judge, who was a highly respected figure throughout his very long life. Even Daniel O'Connell, who thought him a poor lawyer and an equally poor judge, had high personal regard for him.

== Early life ==
He was born in County Kerry, the third boy among the seven children of the Reverend John Day of Lohercannon, Tralee, Chancellor of Ardfert Cathedral, and his wife Lucy, one of the many daughters of Maurice FitzGerald, 14th Knight of Kerry (died 1729) and his wife Elizabeth Crosbie. The Day family had come to Ireland from East Anglia in the seventeenth century. Robert's grandfather Edward Day was a prosperous merchant; his paternal grandmother was Margaret Elizabeth Fuller. Among Robert's four brothers was Edward Day, Archdeacon of Ardfert. Robert and Edward were close throughout their lives, and Edward's death in 1808 was a great blow to Robert. A third brother, John Day, was Mayor of Cork in 1807. Their mother's family, a branch of the great FitzGerald dynasty, had held the hereditary title Knight of Kerry since the thirteenth century.

Robert was fostered by a local family (a custom which was still common in eighteenth-century Kerry) and spoke only Irish until he was seven. He then went to school in Tralee, a town with which he retained a lifelong connection, and where he had close family ties. He entered Trinity College Dublin in 1761, became a scholar in 1764 and graduated Bachelor of Arts in 1766. He entered the Middle Temple in 1769 and spent several years in London, often in the company of his lifelong friend Henry Grattan. He was a lively young man and not apparently much interested in learning the law, preferring to see the sights of London, attend debates in the British House of Commons and make frequent trips to the Continent. He patronised the well-known Grecian Coffee House in Devereux Court off the Strand, where he is said to have enjoyed the company of Oliver Goldsmith. Despite his love of pleasure, his kindly nature is shown by his organising a charitable subscription for the relief of a poor family who were found starving near the Temple. His obvious enjoyment of life came at a heavy cost, as it caused him to neglect his legal studies. Despite his rise to the top of the legal profession, his ignorance of the law was proverbial.

== Legal practice and political career ==
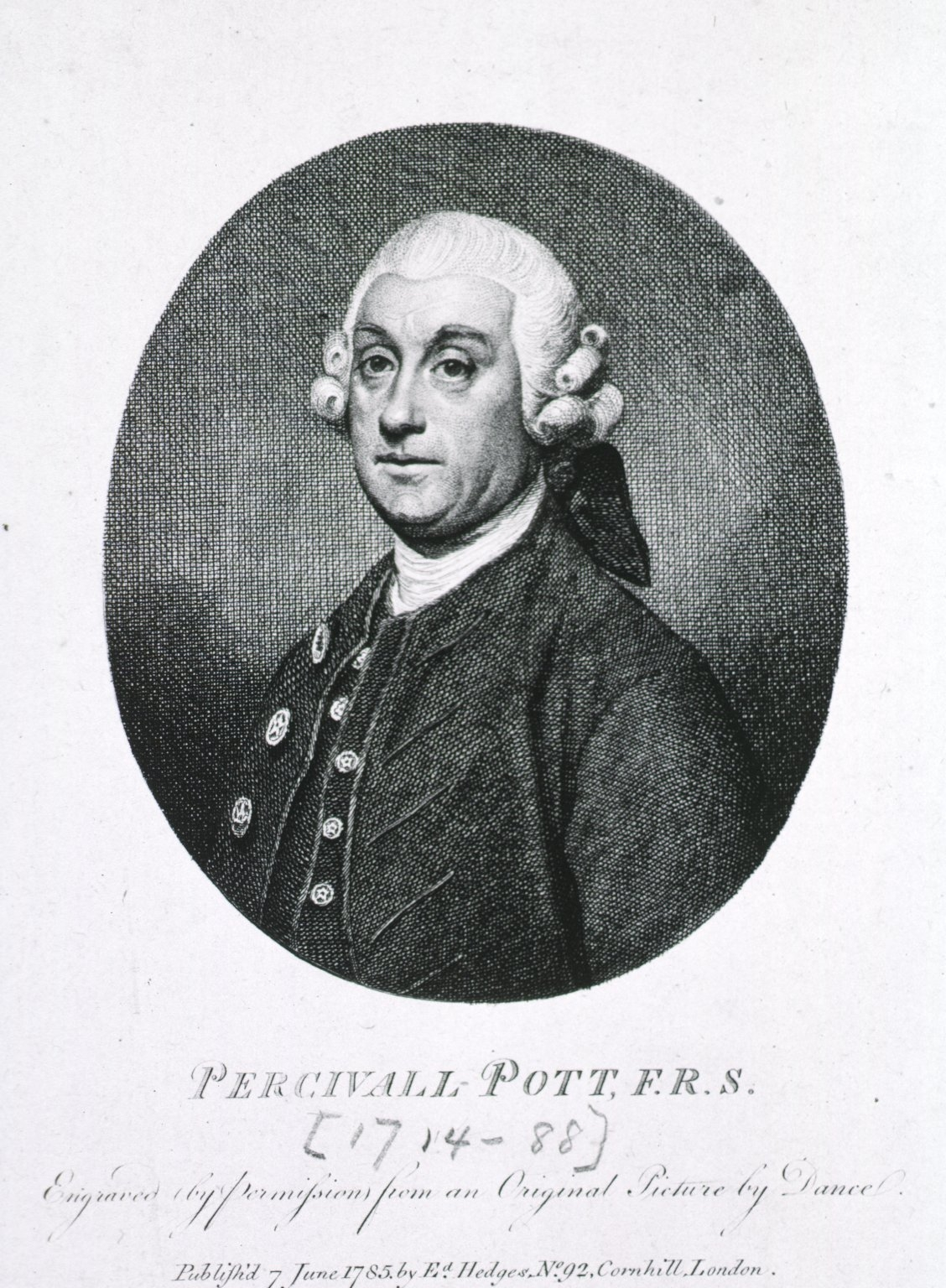
Day's father-in-law, Percivall Pott, one of the foremost English surgeons of his time, noted especially for his work on cancer

He returned to Ireland after spending about five years in England. He settled into a more sedate way of life, having married Mary (Polly) Pott, daughter of the leading English surgeon Percivall Pott, noted for his work in orthopaedics and on the causes of cancer, and his wife Sarah Cruttenden, in 1774. Polly brought him a dowry of £5000. He was called to the Irish Bar the same year, and became King's Counsel in 1790. He was legal and financial advisor to the influential Denny family of Tralee, into which his daughter married. He was regarded as a reliable "Government man", and as a result he was appointed a commissioner for revenue appeals and an advocate of the Irish Admiralty Court. Despite his early neglect of his legal studies and his reputed ignorance of the criminal law, he became Chairman of the Dublin Quarter Sessions in 1790. His success as a lawyer puzzled his acquaintances, who, though nearly all of them liked him, had no regard for his legal learning. Daniel O'Connell, a good friend of his, said that "my poor friend Day is quite innocent of the law" (admittedly O'Connell had a poor opinion of Irish judges generally), and John Philpot Curran had a similarly low opinion of Day's legal ability.

He entered politics, sitting in the Irish House of Commons as member for Tuam and later for Ardfert. He remained a close friend and political ally of Grattan and like him was a member of the popular drinking club called the Monks of the Screw. He was a convinced supporter of Catholic Emancipation and of other measures, such as the abolition of tithes, and the discouragement of absentee landlords, which he hoped would benefit the Catholic peasantry. However, he distrusted most democratic principles, and, due probably to his fear of another 1798 Rebellion, he supported the Act of Union 1800, which delayed Catholic Emancipation for a generation, something he regretted in later life. He retained considerable political influence after he went on the Bench, especially in Tralee, where most of the houses were owned by his son-in-law, Sir Edward Denny. In 1807 he effectively sold the Parliamentary borough of Tralee to the future Duke of Wellington. Wellington later complained about the expense involved in getting himself elected.

== Judge ==
He was appointed a justice of the Court of King's Bench (Ireland) in 1798, and almost immediately afterwards he was appointed to the Special Commission established to deal with the aftermath of the Irish Rebellion of 1798. He was also the junior judge at the trial of the Sheares brothers, Henry and John, who were hanged in July 1798 for their part in the Rebellion. The Rebellion left him with a deep suspicion of most leading Catholic politicians, apart from O'Connell. He visited England in 1807, where he fell seriously ill, and was unable to perform his judicial duties for almost a year. In 1814 he was one of the judges who sat at the trial of the publisher John Magee for seditious libel, where despite their friendship he clashed bitterly with Daniel O'Connell, who was defence counsel. In 1816 he presided at the much publicised quo warranto case, Rex v. O'Grady. In the same year, he presided at the celebrated trial for murder of the Kerry attorney, Rowan Cashel. Cashel, a notoriously quarrelsome young man, had killed his friend Henry Arthur O'Connor in a duel. He was acquitted, as was usual at the time in an affair of honour, after a charge to the jury by Day in Cashel's favour.

As a judge, Day was praised for his integrity, but not for his ability. Daniel O'Connell said that one could always win a case in front of Day by insisting on making the closing argument since Day, by his own admission, generally agreed with whoever spoke last (as Geoghegan remarks, many barristers still employ O'Connell's tactics).

During the Napoleonic Wars he became preoccupied with the danger of revolution and his addresses to grand juries often consisted of a political harangue on the evils of sedition. J.P. Kenyon notes that in England it was a long-standing tradition for the justice of the peace to address grand juries in a similar fashion. His colleague on the Irish Bench, William Fletcher, was also given to treating grand juries to political harangues: his address to the grand jury of County Wexford in 1814 caused uproar.

His personal friendship with O'Connell even survived O'Connell's fatal duel with John D'Esterre in January 1815. When Dublin was rife with news of the impending duel, Day was sent to arrest O'Connell, with the aim of preventing it. O'Connell insisted that he was not the aggressor in the matter, and Day, seemingly satisfied, merely bound him over to keep the peace, thus making the death of D'Esterre inevitable. "Was there ever such a scene?" O'Connell asked later. Day lived long enough to welcome Catholic Emancipation, and was generous in his praise of O'Connell for his crucial role in achieving it.

He retired from the Bench in 1818. He lived at Merrion Square in Dublin city, at Loughlinstown House in south County Dublin, and at Day Place, Tralee. He kept an interesting diary for many years. An extract covering the years 1808–1813 was published in 2002, and the full diaries, together with his grand jury addresses, were published in 2004.

== Death, marriages and children ==
He died at Loughlinstown House in 1841, aged almost ninety-five. By his first wife Mary (Polly) Pott, who died in 1823, he had a daughter Elizabeth, who married Sir Edward Denny, 3rd Baronet, and had six children including Sir Edward Denny, 4th Baronet. She died in England in 1828.

Although Day's first marriage was apparently happy (certainly he always speaks affectionately of Polly in his diary), he had two sons, John and Edward, by Mary (nicknamed "Moggy") Fitzgerald, daughter of Bartholomew Fitzgerald, a physician of Bandon, County Cork, who became his second wife in 1824. The boys were born in the late 1790s during his first wife's lifetime, so Polly was surely aware of their paternity. He made provision for both sons in his will, and they adopted the surname Day. Mary, who was a Roman Catholic, had lived with the family for many years as a companion and later nurse to Polly. She died in 1849.

John, their elder son, followed the family tradition of entering the Church. He inherited from the senior branch of the family their property at Beaufort, County Kerry. He married Lucy Thompson, daughter of William Thompson, Archdeacon of Cork and Mary Chetwode. He was the grandfather of Charles Towry-Law, 4th Baron Ellenborough.

== Character ==
Ball, writing in the mid-1920s, describes Day as a man who was "estimable in every way". Whether Ball was aware of his unconventional domestic life is unclear (the first published references to Day's relationship with Mary Fitzgerald was in the 1938 memoir of the judge by Ella Day, who had married his descendant, Colonel George Day). Nonetheless, there is ample evidence of his kindly and charitable nature, and of his great gift for friendship. In his later years, he inclined more and more to religion. Kenny adds that the descriptions we have of his pleasure-filled youth in London give an attractive picture of a lively and fun-loving young man.

== Sources ==
- Ball, F. Elrington The Judges in Ireland 1221-1921 London John Murray 1926
- Burke Landed Gentry of Ireland Vol. 3 London 1849
- Burke's Peerage 107th Edition, reprinted Delaware 2003
- Day, Ella B. Mr Justice Day of Kerry 1745-1841- a discursive memoir Exeter 1938
- Day, John Robert Fitzgerald ("Fitz-Erin" Killarney Sketches George Herbert Dublin 1862 Reprinted with an Introduction and notes by J.A. Murphy 2011
- Ferguson, Kenneth Robert Day (1746-1841) Oxford Dictionary of National Biography Oxford University Press 2004
- Geoghegan, Patrick M. King Dan- the rise of Daniel O'Connell 1775-1829 Gill and Macmillan 2008
- Kenny, Colum King's Inns and the Kingdom of Ireland Irish Academic Press Dublin 1992
- Longford, Elizabeth Wellington- the Years of the Sword Panther edition 1971
- O'Carroll, Gerald, ed. Diary of Mr. Justice Robert Day of Kerry (1746-1841) North Munster Antiquarian Journal Vol.42 2002 pp. 151–174
- O'Carroll, Gerald Mr Justice Robert Day (1746-1841) The Diaries and Addresses to Grand Juries 1793-1829 Polymaths Press 2004
- Woods, C.L. "Day, Robert" Cambridge Dictionary of Irish Biography 2009
