= Ellenborough Park, Weston-super-Mare =

Suburb in North Somerset, England

Ellenborough Park
- Site of Special Scientific Interest
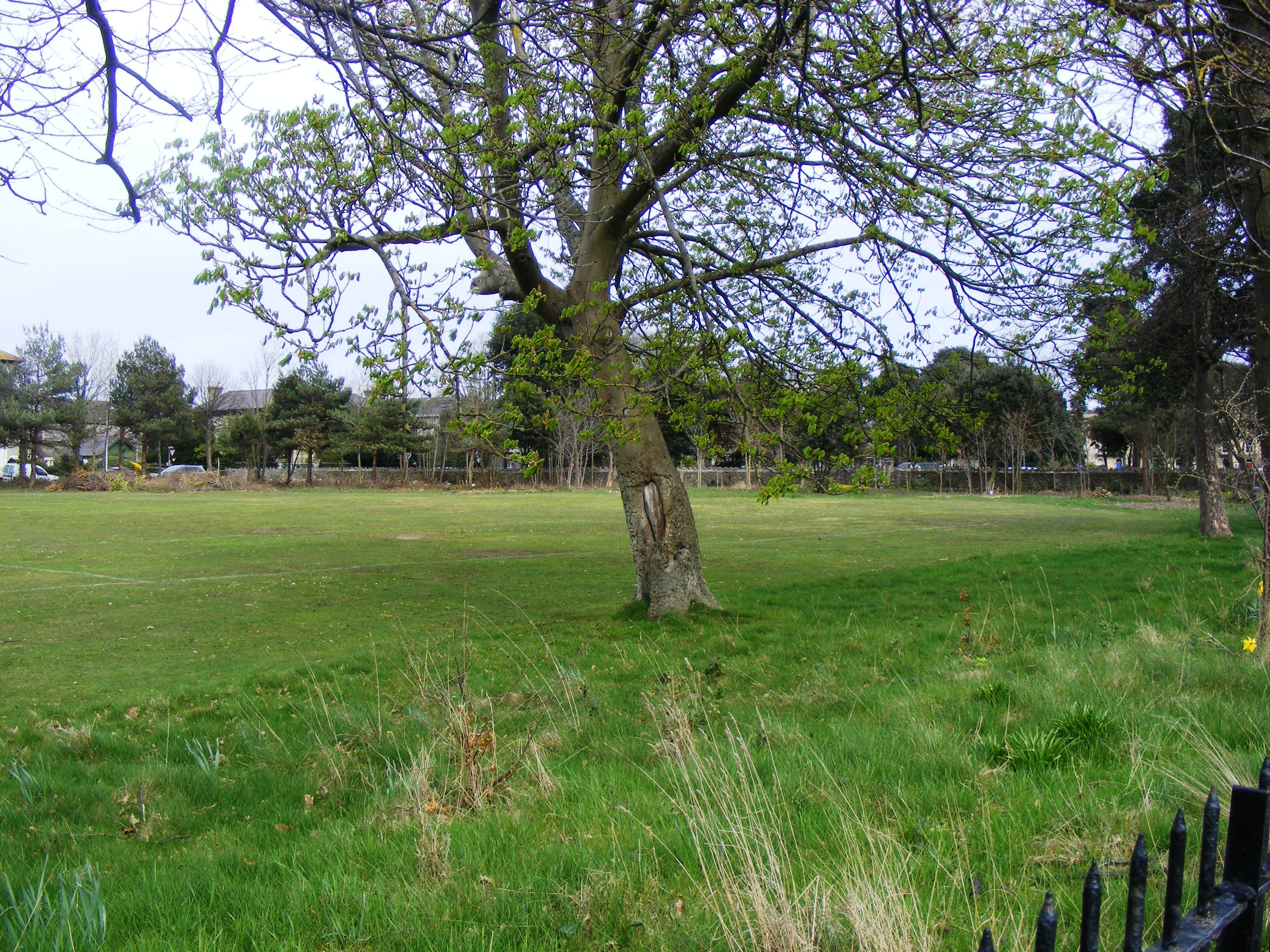

- Location within Somerset
- Location of Ellenborough Park.
- Area of search: Avon
- Grid reference: ST319608
- Coordinates: 51.3422°N 2.9791°W
- Interest: Biological
- Area: 1.8 hectares (4.4 acres)
- Notification date: 1989

Ellenborough Park is a suburb consisting of a park situated in the centre of Weston-super-Mare, North Somerset, England.

The western half of the park, an area of 1.8 hectares (4.4 acres), is of significant biodiversity interest, due to its plant communities, and was notified as a biological Site of Special Scientific Interest in 1989. The eastern half of the park contains a play area for local children, which was opened in 2005.

Ellenborough Park was also the subject of a significant legal case Re Ellenborough Park in 1955 which determined criteria for easements in English property law.

== Site description ==
The park is situated 75 m (246 ft) inland from Weston-super-Mare beach, on a site which was formerly part of a sand dune system of the Bristol Channel. The soil here is calcareous and sandy, and the short-turf grassland which is supports is believed to be remnant dune grassland from this dune system, which was enclosed in the 19th century.

== Vegetation ==
The species composition of this grassland includes the following grasses: Sand Cat's-tail (Phleum arenarium), Red Fescue (Festuca rubra), Sea Fern-grass (Desmazeria marina) and Cock's-foot (Dactylis glomerata). Herb species present include Sea Stork's-bill (Erodium maritimum), Buck's-horn Plantain (Plantago coronopus), Rough Clover (Trifolium scabrum), all of which are indicative of a maritime influence, plus Wild Clary (Salvia verbenaca), Smooth Hawk's-beard (Crepis capillaris) and Pink-sorrel (Oxalis articulata).

Ellenborough Park supports two Red Data Book plants, Branched Horsetail (Equisetum ramosissimum) and Smooth Rupturewort (Herniaria glabra). Branched Horsetail is only found in one other locality in Great Britain, in Lincolnshire. Smooth Rupturewort is found in eight other localities in Britain, all in East Anglia.

== See also ==
- Re Ellenborough Park for summary of English Property Law case.
