= Ellenborough Park Hotel =

Country house hotel in Gloucestershire, England

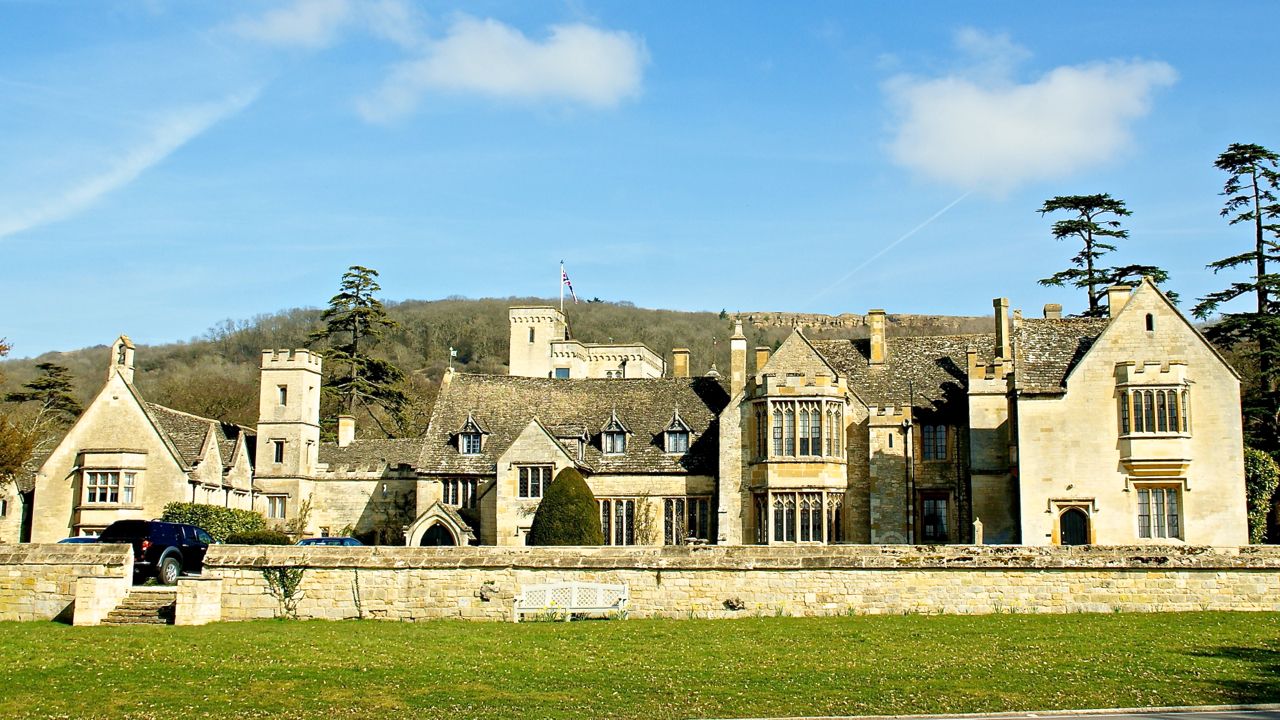
- Ellenborough Park Hotel

- Location within Gloucestershire

General information
- Location: Southam Road, Southam, Gloucestershire, England
- Coordinates: 51°55′36″N 2°2′30″W
- Opening: 2011

Other information
- Number of rooms: 61
- Number of suites: 4
- Number of restaurants: 2
- Number of bars: 1

Ellenborough Park Hotel (previously the baronial hall, Southam House or Southam Delabere) is a country house hotel in Southam, about 2 1/2 miles (4.0 km) northeast of the centre of Cheltenham, Gloucestershire, England. It is a Grade II* listed building.

Southam is at the foot of Cleeve Hill, the highest point of the Cotswolds, and is part of Tewkesbury Borough. As Southam House, it was the seat of Richard de la Bere and later the Earl of Ellenborough, and afterwards became a girls' school and then the De la Bere Hotel. The current hotel was established in 2008; it has 61 rooms.

== History ==
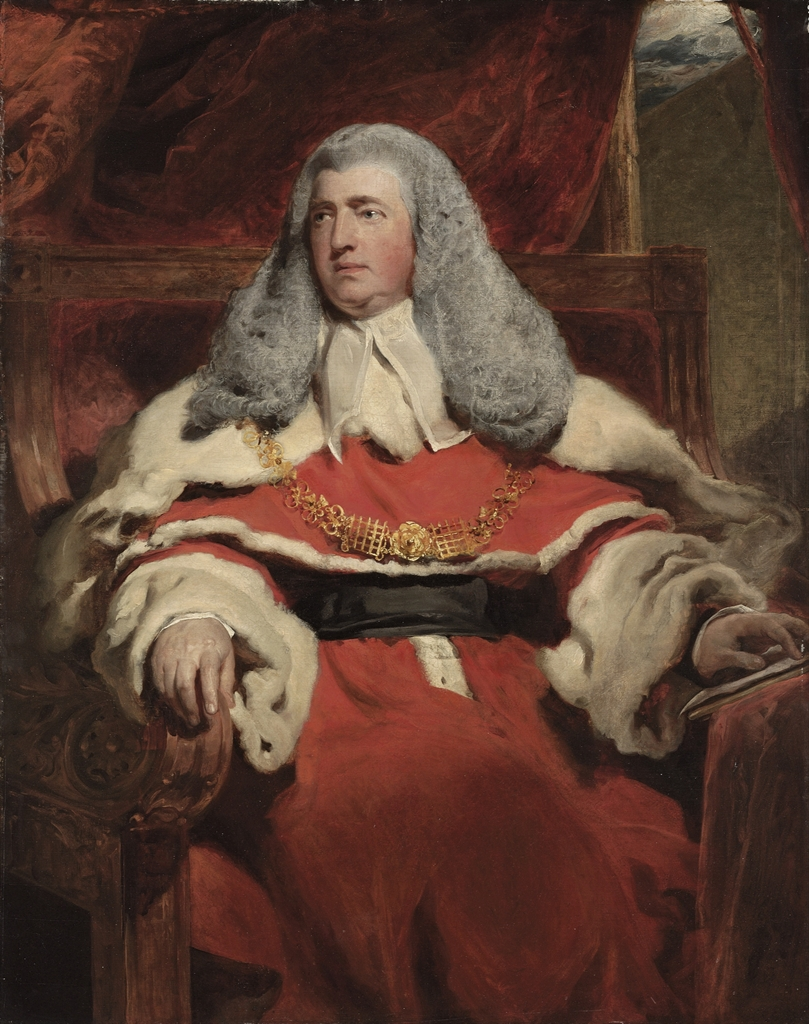
Edward Law, 1st Baron Ellenborough

In 1487, after the Battle of Stoke, Henry VII honoured Sir Richard de la Bere with a bannerette. Kinnair de la Bere married Sir John Huddleston's daughter and settled down at the bannerette of Southam where he built a manor house, at the foot of the hill in a fertile valley which was surrounded by forest and named it Southam House. At that time he was Sheriff of Gloucestershire. In 1609, the manor house was bought by Richard de la Bere. He died without an heir and left his property to Kinnair de la Bere who also did not have any male children and so the property was inherited by his nephew Thomas le da Bagott, who was known for his kindness and hospitality. During its time as a stately home, eminent guests such as George III stayed at the residence. It was the seat of the Earl of Ellenborough in the 1830s when it was still known as Southam House. Renovations and additions to the old manor house were made in Gothic and neo-Norman architectural style between 1833 and 1871 by Baron Ellenborough who was formerly Governor General of India. The renovations covered the ancient baronial hall, restoration of the tracery and other architectural features. At this time, it was adorned with antique decorations, and a few years later, it had a collection of old portraits. Later, it functioned as a private girls' school, Oriel School, which closed in 1972. It was built with randomly placed and dressed limestone square blocks.

It then served as the Hotel De La Bere, until it was purchased in 2008 and converted into a luxury hotel. A path connects the grounds to the nearby Cheltenham Racecourse. The hotel has a very large hall and is surrounded by well turned out gardens. The main hotel is in the original building and also in a few annexes buildings. It became a Grade II* listed building on 4 July 1960.

== Architecture ==
When originally built it was a double storied building. The main hall was floored with coloured tiles from the remnants of Hailes Abbey. The tiles were inscribed with names of the original builders. The decorations in the house also included some very rare paintings, of which two pictures of Edward VI, one in his young age and the other at a later part of his life, which are unique; these are panels which were painted by Holbein. In addition, there are several more family pictures and also paintings of Jane Shore and Sir Thomas Overbury. Also seen are the inscriptions, at the base of a pillar, in three languages of Greek, Latin and English. Windows are embellished with arms and crest of Henry VII and "the quartered escutcheon of the family with plumed crest granted by the Black Prince." It was then the joint property of Miss De La Bere and Mrs Webb who were sisters of the deceased Thomas De La Bere. In 1826, it was Miss De La Bere who lived in the manor house.

Its layout plan is quite complex with a hall on the west side with a wing laid perpendicular to it on the western side. The courtyard is facing northwest of the hall. The western end has the "Great Hall at the centre with two tall 4-light stone-mullioned casements with king mullions, diamond leaded panes, heraldic glass and a continuous hood; projecting gabled 2-storey porch to the left." The extended part of the building has been built ashlar surfacing and the roof consists of stone slate with ashlar stacks.

The structure is built in the early Tudor style from Cotswold stone, with architectural features of the times such as turrets, arches and towers. The two-storeyed structure does not contain a parapet. One of the halls is partially decorated with glazed or painted tiles brought from Hailes Abbey. After the old public house in Fulham was pulled down, its wainscoting was add to the baronial house. Many of the original furnishings remain including the 16th century oak beams, staircases and fireplaces but it has undergone much modernisation with up-to-date devices. It has 62 rooms and suites, each of different design with artistically designed fireplaces including modern facilities for iPod connections. It consists of four buildings, with the outbuildings providing further accommodation for guest lodging. Notable rooms mentioned are the Woodland Court and The Istabraq Suite, which was the original Great Hall of the main house of the manor. The largest room though is the De la Bere Court on the ground floor of the main house, which is a vaulted glass atrium with patio doors opening out onto the lawn.
