= Re Ellenborough Park =

English land law case

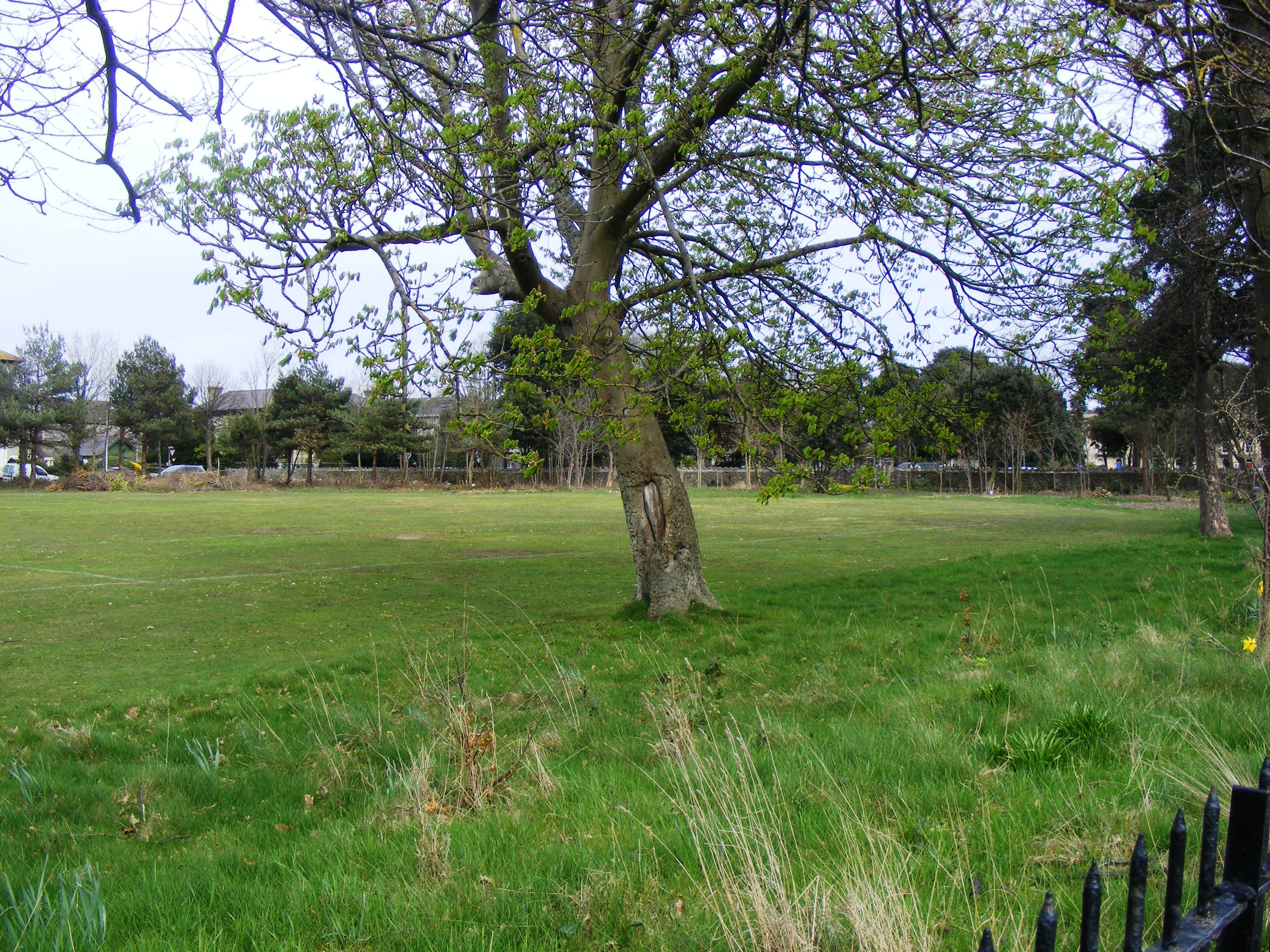
- Ellenborough Park
- Court: Court of Appeal
- Full case name: [the trustees for the statutory and will trusts of the park landowners (deceased)] [very detailed names and descriptions, never cited in full] -and- Helen Maddison (Married Woman) and Fred Allen [a selection of the owners of the neighbouring houses]
- Decided: 15 November 1955
- Citations: [1955] EWCA Civ 4; [1955] 3 All ER 667; [1956] Ch 131; [1955] 3 WLR 892
- Transcript: The court-approved transcript at bailii.org

Case history
- Prior action: Appellant (a fiduciary "representative" rather than a hostile litigant) also "lost" at first instance before Danckwerts J (in the High Court)
- Subsequent action: none

Case opinions
- Held: "we can see no difference in principle between Ellenborough Park and a garden in the ordinary signification of that word. It is the collective garden of the neighbouring houses to whose use it was dedicated by the owners of the estate and as such amply satisfied, in our judgment, the requirement of connection with the dominant tenements to which it is appurtenant. The result is not affected by the circumstance that the right to the park is in this case enjoyed by some few houses which are not immediately fronting on the park.... The right here ... is, for reasons already given, one appurtenant to the surrounding houses as such, and constitutes a beneficial attribute of residence in a house as ordinarily understood. Its use for the purposes, not only of exercise and rest but also for such normal domestic purposes as were suggested in argument – for example, for taking out small children in prams or otherwise – is not fairly to be described as one of mere recreation or amusement, and is clearly beneficial to the premises to which it is attached."
- Decision by: Sir Raymond Evershed MR (reading the judgment of the court)
- Concurrence: Birkett LJ; Romer LJ

Keywords
- Scope of law of easements; creation of easements; express easement and/or easement by prescription; whether right to use park in title deeds an easement; nature of rights capable of forming an easement in law

Re Ellenborough Park [1955] EWCA Civ 4 was an English land law case which reformulated the tests for an easement (the scope of the law of easements). It found an easement to use a communal garden to be a valid easement in law. There is no requirement for all of the houses to be immediately next to the garden to benefit from it.

== Facts ==
Ellenborough Park is a 7.5-acre (3.0 ha) park in Weston-super-Mare (split by a minor road, not considered by either side, nor the courts consequential). (Note: The size of the road is not counted in this figure, if it were, the size would be 7.66 acres) The larger park was owned in 1855 by two tenants in common who sold off outlying parts for the building of houses, and granted rights in the purchase/sale deeds to the house owners (and expressly to their successors in title) to enjoy the parkland which remained.

The land was enjoyed freely until 1955, when Mr Justice Danckwerts delivered his decision on a complex dispute at first instance. The nub of the case appealed centred on a monetary question affecting the land for the first time. It centred on the fact that the War Office had used the land during World War II, and compensation was due to be paid to the neighbours (if correctly alleging a proprietary interest to use the land, namely an easement) or the landowner, the trustees of the original owner if they were the sole person(s) with an owning interest (under the Compensation Defence Act 1939, section 2 (1)). (Note: The Compensation (Defence) Act 1939 s 2(1) stated "The compensation payable under this Act in respect of the taking possession of any land shall be the aggregate of the following sums, that is to say, — (a) a sum equal to the rent which might reasonably be expected to be payable by a tenant in occupation of the land, during the period for which possession of the land is retained in the exercise of emergency powers, under a lease granted immediately before the beginning of that period, whereby the tenant undertook to pay all usual tenant's rates and taxes and to bear the cost of the repairs and insurance and the other expenses, if any, necessary to maintain the land in a state to command that rent …" s2(2): the rent "… shall be considered as accruing due from day to day during the period for which the possession of the land is taken in the exercise of emergency powers, and be apportionable in respect of time accordingly, and shall be paid to the person who for the time being would be entitled to occupy the land but for the fact that possession thereof is retained in the exercise of such powers …")

The landowner (of the park), the beneficiaries of the trust of the original owners of the land, challenged the assertion of an "easement" from the immediate neighbours enjoying the expressed right to use the park in their deeds (title), which they in practice also regularly enjoyed. They stated these neighbouring owner-occupiers (and their tenants) had only a personal advantage (a licence, with no proprietary rights), and not an easement proper (which would include proprietary rights).

== Judgment ==
Lord Evershed MR held the occupiers of the properties in question did enjoy an easement over Ellenborough Park. He determined that four criteria for defining an easement existed, taken from Dr. Geoffrey Cheshire's The Modern Law of Real Property. and said:

For the purposes of the argument before us Mr Cross and Mr Goff were content to adopt, as correct, the four characteristics formulated in Dr Cheshire's "Modern Real Property", 7th Edition, at pages 456 and following. They are (1) There must be a dominant and a servient tenement: (2) an easement must "accommodate" the dominant tenement: (3) dominant and servient owners must be different persons and (4) a right over land cannot amount to an easement unless it is capable of forming the subject matter of a grant.

[...]

Can it be said, then, of the right of full enjoyment of the park in question which was granted by the Conveyance of the 23rd December, 1864, and which, for reasons already given, was, in our view, intended to be annexed to the property conveyed to Mr Porter, that it accommodated and served that property? It is clear that the right did, in some degree, enhance the value of the property and this consideration cannot be dismissed as wholly irrelevant. It is, of course, a point to be noted; but we agree with Mr Cross's submission that it is in no way decisive of the problem; it is not sufficient to show that the right increased the value of the property conveyed unless it is also shown that it was connected with the normal enjoyment of that property. It appears to us that the question whether or not this connection exists is primarily one of fact, and depends largely on the nature of the alleged dominant tenement and the nature of the right granted. As to the former, it was in the contemplation of the parties to the 1864 Conveyance that the property conveyed should be used for residential and not commercial purposes. That appears from the Conveyance itself, and the covenant by the purchaser already quoted, that the dwelling-house etc. which he bound himself to build should not "be occupied or used as an open or exposed shop or for any purpose of trade or commerce other than a lodging house or private school or seminary" without the vendor's written consent. Since it is stated in paragraph 4 of Mr Rendell's affidavit in support of the Summons and has been conceded that all the conveyances of plots for building purposes fronting or near Ellenborough Park were as regards (inter alia) user substantially the same as the 1864 Conveyance, the inevitable inference is that the houses which, were to be built upon the plots were to constitute a residential estate. As appears from the map which is Exhibit "G" to Mr Rendell's further affidavit of the 13th October, 1955, the houses which were built upon the plots around and near to Ellenborough Park varied in size, some being large detached houses and others smaller and either semi-detached or in a row. We have already stated that the purchasers of all the plots which actually abutted on the Park were granted the right to enjoy the use of it as were also the purchasers of some of the plots which, although not fronting upon the Park, were only a short distance away from it. As to the nature of the right granted, the 1864 Conveyance shows that the Park was to be kept and maintained as a pleasure ground or ornamental garden and that it was contemplated that it should at all times be kept in good order and condition and well stocked with plants and shrubs; and the vendors covenanted that they would not at any time thereafter erect or permit to be erected any dwelling-house or other building (except a grotto, bower, summer-house, flower-stand, fountain, music-stand or other ornamental erection) within or on any part of the pleasure ground. On these facts Mr Cross submitted that the requisite connection between the right to use the Park and the normal enjoyment of the houses which were built around it or near it had not been established. He likened the position to a right granted to the purchaser of a house to use the Zoological Gardens free of charge or to attend Lord's Cricket Ground without payment. Such a right would undoubtedly, he said, increase the value of the property conveyed but could not run with it at law as an easement, because there was no sufficient nexus between the enjoyment of the right and the use of the house. It is probably true, we think, that in neither of Mr Cross's illustrations would the supposed right constitute an easement, for it would be wholly extraneous to, and independent of, the use of a house as a house, namely, as a place in which the householder and his family live and make their home; and it is for this reason that the analogy which Mr Cross sought to establish between his illustrations and the present case cannot, in our opinion, be supported. A much closer analogy, as it seems to us, is the case of a man selling the freehold of part of his house and granting to the purchaser, his heirs and assigns, the right, appurtenant to such part, to use the garden in common with the vendor and his assigns. In such a case the test of connection, or accommodation, would be amply satisfied; for just as the use of a garden undoubtedly enhances, and is connected with, the normal enjoyment of the house to which it belongs, so also would the right granted, in the case supposed, be closely connected with the use and enjoyment of the part of the premises sold. Such, we think, is in substance the position in the present case. The park became a communal garden for the benefit and enjoyment of those whose houses adjoined it or were in its close proximity. Its flower beds, lawns and walks were calculated to afford all the amenities which it is the purpose of the garden of a house to provide; and apart from the fact that these amenities extended to a number of householders instead of being confined to one (which on this aspect of the case is immaterial) we can see no difference in principle between Ellenborough Park and a garden in the ordinary signification of that word. It is the collective garden of the neighbouring houses to whose use it was dedicated by the owners of the estate and as such amply satisfied, in our judgment, the requirement of connection with the dominant tenements to which it is appurtenant. The result is not affected by the circumstance that the right to the park is in this case enjoyed by some few houses which are not immediately fronting on the park. The test for present purposes, no doubt, is that the park should constitute in a real and intelligible sense the garden (albeit the communal garden) of the houses to which its enjoyment is annexed. But we think that the test is satisfied as regards these few neighbouring, thought not adjacent, houses. We think that the extension of the right of enjoyment to these few houses does not negative the presence of the necessary "nexus" between the subject-matter enjoyed and the premises to which the enjoyment is expressed to belong.

[...]

The third of the questions embraced in Dr. Cheshire's fourth condition rests primarily on a proposition stated in Theobald's The Law of Land (1929) at page 263, where it is said that an easement "must be a right of utility and benefit and not one of mere recreation and amusement." It does not appear that a proposition in similar terms is stated by Gale. The passage in Theobald is justified by reference to two cases: Mounsey v Ismay, 3 Hurlstone & Coltman, pages 486, 498, and Solomon v Vintners Co., 4 Hurlstone & Norman, pages 585, 593. The second of these cases was concerned with a right of support, and appears only to be relevant for present purposes on account of an intervention in the course of the argument on the part of Chief Baron Pollock and Baron Bramwell at page 593 of the Report, in which it was suggested that one who had for a long period played rackets against the wall of a neighbour would have a right not to have the wall pulled down. We were also referred in argument to the Scottish case in the House of Lords of Dyce v Hay, 1 MacQueen, page 305, and to the earlier case before Lord Eldon therein referred to of Dempster v Cleghorn, 2 Dow, page 40. The former of these two cases was concerned with a claim on the part of the inhabitants of Aberdeen to roam at will over a piece of land bordering upon the River Don, and for such purpose to use every part of the land to the practical exclusion of any right of user on the part of the owner. The case was therefore one involving what could strictly be called a claim by a large and ill-defined number of people to a jus spatiandi. In Lord Eldon's case (in which the only decision was to refer the matter back to the Court of Session) the dispute was between certain persons, inhabitants of the City of St. Andrews and others, claiming the right of playing golf on the St. Andrews' Golf Links, and a tenant whose rabbits were said to be interfering with the proper maintenance of the Golf Course. Lord Eldon observed that the case had excited great warmth of feeling - which indeed may sufficiently appear from the allegation that some of the rabbits on the Course were English rabbits. Neither that case nor the case of Dyce v Hay appear to us to lend real support to the proposition stated by Theobald, at least in its application to such a ease as the present.

[...]

No doubt a garden is a pleasure - on high authority, it is the purest of pleasures; but, in our judgment, it is not a right having no quality either of utility or benefit as those words should be understood. The right here in suit is, for reasons already given, one appurtenant to the surrounding houses as such, and constitutes a beneficial attribute of residence in a house as ordinarily understood. Its use for the purposes, not only of exercise and rest but also for such normal domestic purposes as were suggested in argument - for example, for taking out small children in prams or otherwise - is not fairly to be described as one of mere recreation or amusement, and is clearly beneficial to the premises to which it is attached. If Baron Martin's test is applied, the right in suit is, in point of utility, fairly analogous to a right of way passing over fields to, say, the railway station, which would be none the less a good right, even though it provided a longer route to the objective. We think therefore that the statement of Baron Martin must at least be confined to the exclusion of rights to indulge in such recreations as were in question in the case before him, horse racing or perhaps playing games, and has no application to the facts of the present case.

== See also ==
- Easements in English law
