= Southam, Gloucestershire =

Village in Gloucestershire, England

Coordinates: 51.929266°N 2.043728°W

Southam
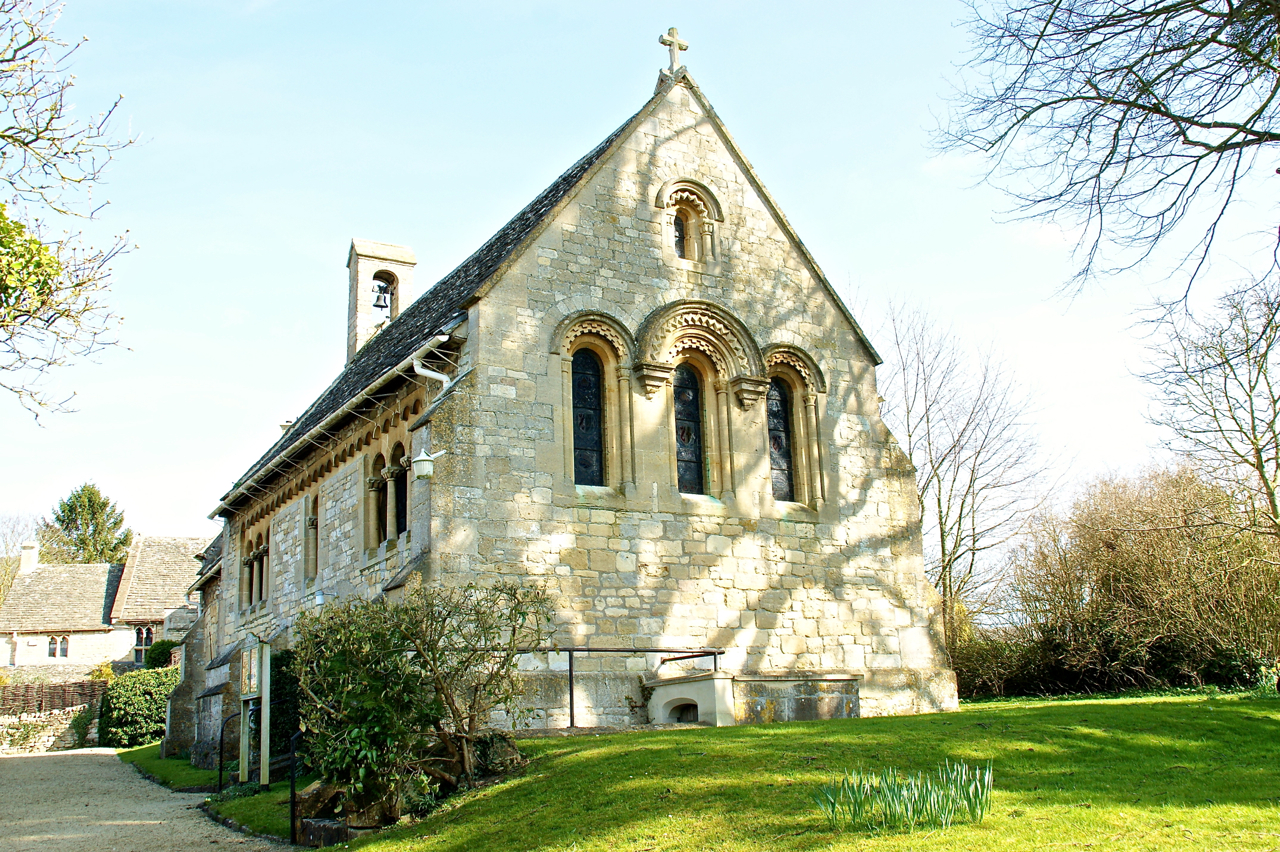
- Church of the Ascension, Southam, Gloucestershire

- Location within Gloucestershire
- Population: 1,175
- OS grid reference: SO970256
- Civil parish: Southam
- District: Tewkesbury
- Shire county: Gloucestershire
- Region: South West
- Country: England
- Sovereign state: United Kingdom
- Post town: Cheltenham
- Postcode district: GL52
- Police: Gloucestershire
- Fire: Gloucestershire
- Ambulance: South Western

Southam is a village in Gloucestershire, England, located on the outskirts of Cheltenham. Its main features are a Manor House, which has now been converted to a hotel, a 12th Century Church and the Gloucestershire Warwickshire Railway, which runs through the outskirts of the village.

It is primarily a residential community for workers in Cheltenham, and has a growing retired and working population, attracted by the scenic countryside.

Though small in size, Southam has a thriving community. The village hall is used for coffee mornings, yoga sessions and the regularly occurring kids club among other things.

The parish of Southam had a population of 1,175 according to the 2011 census.

== History ==
By c.991 the name Southam was already in use, possibly derived from its position south of the larger parish of Bishop's Cleeve. In the Domesday Book it is written as Surham and was held by Durand, the Sheriff of Gloucester. From 1865 the village was also known as Southam-de-la-bere, this was to distinguish it from Southam in Warwickshire.

Before Southam was in the hands of the de la Bere family in the 17th century, the land was owned by Humphrey de Bohun, 7th Earl of Hereford. His youngest daughter, Mary de Bohun, was given the Manor as a dowry when she married Henry Bolingbroke in 1381, who later became Henry IV.

Henry IV annexed it to the Duchy of Lancaster and later on James I granted the Manor to Robert Cecil, the Earl of Salisbury, who then sold it to Richard de la Bere.

Richard de la Bere was the Lord of the Manor of Southam from 1609, and his Manor house was near the present Pigeon House in Southam Lane.

Richard de la Bere was a Barrister of Law at Lincoln's Inn, and he died in 1636. His wife Margaret had the magnificent de la Bere tomb built in the south aisle of St. Michael's Church in Bishop's Cleeve in 1639, at a cost of £400.

They had no children, so his cousin, Kinnard de la Bere, inherited the title, and Southam House became the Manor House from 1636. In 1734 Kinnard's great-grandson Kinard de la Bere died childless, leaving the manor to William Baghott of Prestbury, the second son of William Baghott and Anne de la Bere (m.1684), who took on the name and arms of de la Bere. His eldest son, Thomas Baghott de la Bere, then inherited the estate.

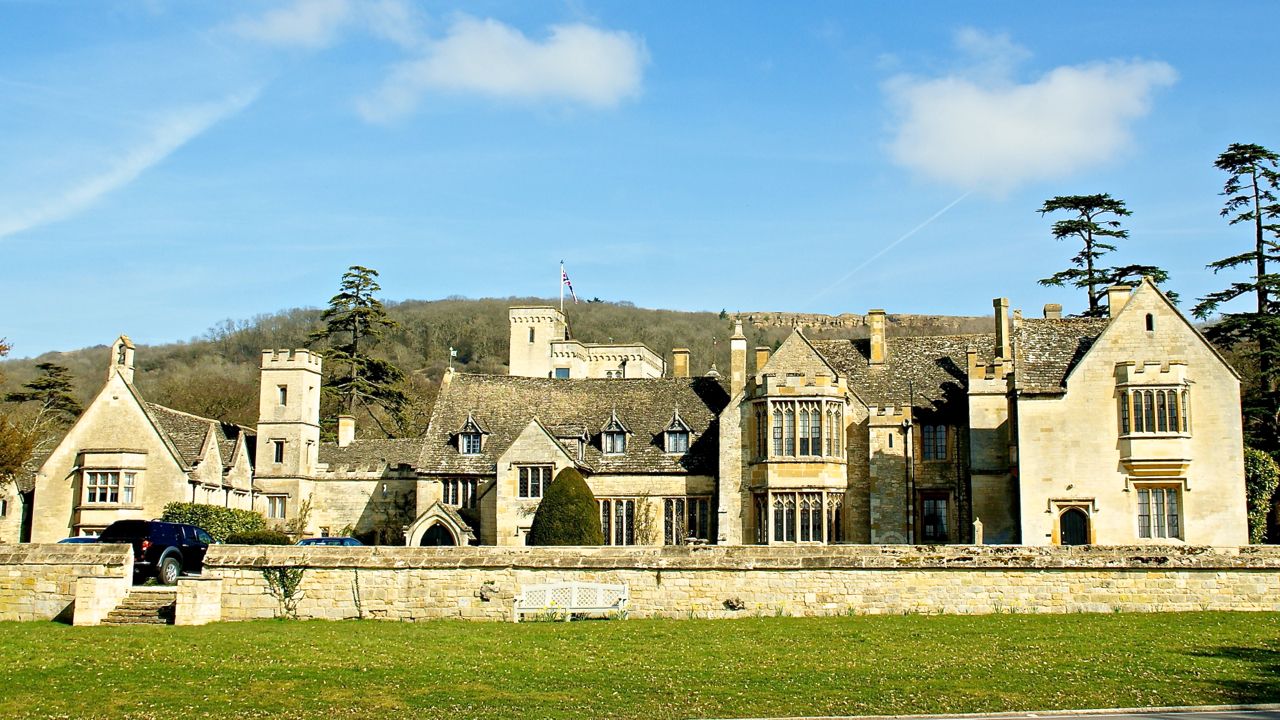
Southam House, now Ellenborough Park Hotel

Thomas Goodman is thought to have begun building Southam House c.1500 and was completed by Sir John Huddleston, who was steward of Sudeley Castle.

Southam House was later used by The Oriel School for Girls and now it is the Ellenborough Park Hotel.

The Grade II* listed Tithe Barn and 12th-century Church of the Ascension are also points of interest. The church was abandoned to storing crops and making cider at some stage after 1646. In 1862 The Earl of Ellenborough restored the church in memory of his first wife, Lady Octavia Stewart, who had died of tuberculosis after five years of marriage. Ownership of the church transferred to the Diocese of Gloucester in 1957.
