= Ewanrigg =

Settlement in Cumbria, England

Coordinates: 54.705°N 3.491°W

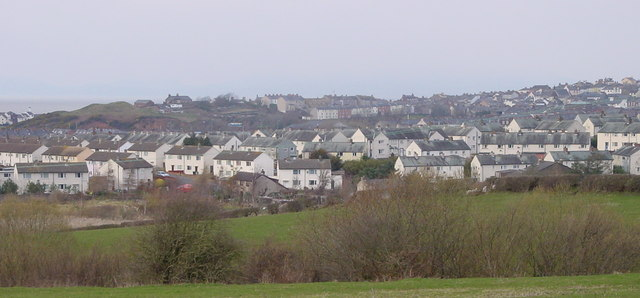
- Ewanrigg

- Location in Allerdale, Cumbria Location within Cumbria
- Population: 3,447 (2011)
- OS grid reference: NY039355
- Civil parish: Maryport
- Unitary authority: Cumberland
- Ceremonial county: Cumbria
- Region: North West
- Country: England
- Sovereign state: United Kingdom
- Post town: MARYPORT
- Postcode district: CA15
- Dialling code: 01900
- Police: Cumbria
- Fire: Cumbria
- Ambulance: North West
- UK Parliament: Penrith and Solway

Ewanrigg is a suburb of the town of Maryport, Cumbria, England, historically within Cumberland. Ewanrigg is a residential area and has a post office, a school and a few places of worship.

== Location ==
It is near the River Ellen and is only about 1 mi (2 km) away from the estuary, which goes out into the Solway Firth. Carlisle lies 26 mi (42 km) to the north-east

== Governance ==
Ewanrigg is in the parliamentary constituency of Penrith and Solway.

For Local Government purposes it is in the Cumberland unitary authority area.

Ewanrigg does not have its own Parish Council, instead it is part of Maryport Town Council.

== Transport ==
For transport there is the A594 road going through the settlement and the A596 road nearby; Maryport railway station is also nearby. Other suburbs of Maryport include Ellenborough, Netherton and Glasson.
