= Charles Towry-Law, 3rd Baron Ellenborough =

Lieutenant Colonel The Right Honourable The Lord Ellenborough
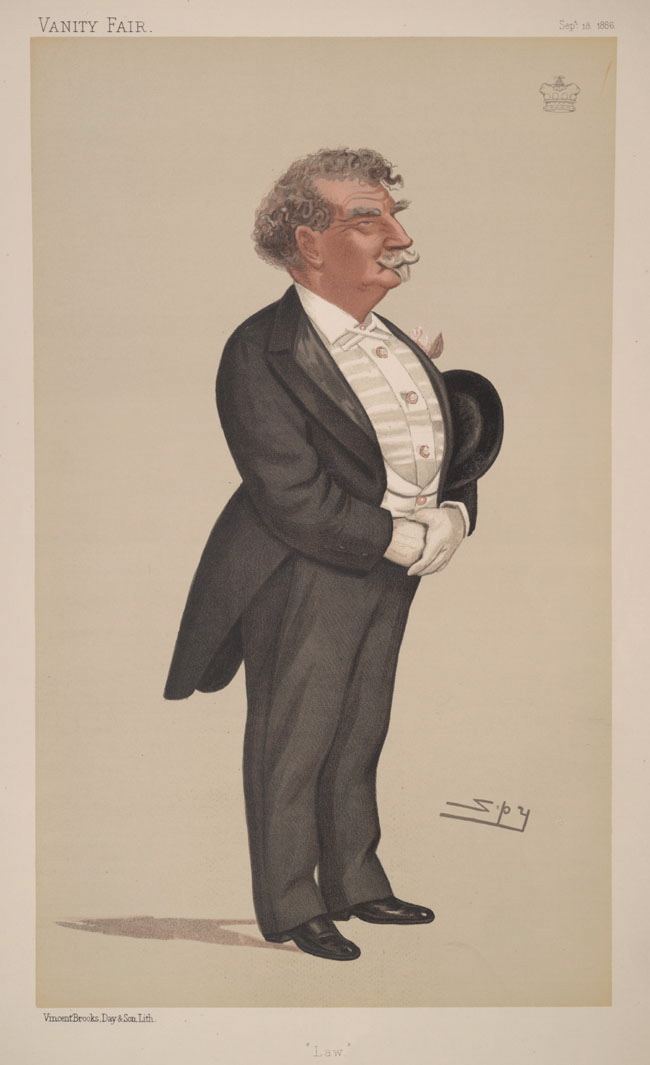
- Charles Edmund Towry-Law by Sir Leslie Ward

Member of the House of Lords (Note: As Baron Ellenborough.)
- Lord Temporal
- In office 22 December 1871 – 9 October 1890
- Preceded by: The 1st Earl of Ellenborough
- Succeeded by: The 4th Baron Ellenborough

Personal details
- Born: Charles Edmund Law; 17 November 1820
- Died: 9 October 1890 (aged 69)
- Occupation: Officer

Lieutenant Colonel Charles Edmund Towry-Law, 3rd Baron Ellenborough (17 November 1820 – 9 October 1890), was a member of the House of Lords. He was the oldest surviving son of the Hon. Charles Law QC who had 10 children.

Law succeeded to the title on the death of his uncle, Edward Law, 1st Earl of Ellenborough, in 1871. He was educated at Winchester College and joined the British Army in 1844. He reached the rank of lieutenant colonel in the 6th Regiment of Foot.

In 1885, Law assumed, by royal licence, the additional surname of Towry.

== Family ==
Law married four times: firstly in 1840 he married Lady Eleanor Cecil Howard (daughter of William Howard, 4th Earl of Wicklow, and Lady Cecil Hamilton), who died in 1852. Secondly, in 1855, Anna Elizabeth Fitzgerald-Day, daughter of the Reverend John Robert Fitzgerald-Day of Beaufort, County Kerry, and Lucy Thompson, who died in 1860, leaving a son Charles. Thirdly, in 1863, Isabella Ogilby, daughter of Alexander Ogilby, she died in 1874, and fourthly Beatrice Joanna Knatchbull, daughter of Sir Norton Knatchbull, 10th Baronet, in 1874; she died in 1931.

Lord Ellenborough died in 1890, leaving his surviving wife and three children by former marriages—namely, Charles Towry-Law, 4th Baron Ellenborough, who succeeded to the title, and two daughters, Gertrude and Emily Law. All three became absolutely entitled to a considerable amount of property, but Charles and Gertrude were of unsound mind and in weak health.

Emily Law came of age in 1893, and under the circumstances, she was advised to make a voluntary settlement of her property and expectancies. Accordingly, on 22 December 1893, she executed a deed by which she declared trusts of a large sum of stock which she had previously transferred into the names of the trustees, and by the same deed she granted and assigned to them all the real and personal estate to which in the event of the death of her brother and sister respectively she might become entitled under his or her will of as heiress-at-law of next of kin. The trusts of the settlement were to pay a small annuity to her stepmother, and subject thereto for herself for life with usual remainders over. Gertrude Law died in 1895 intestate and a spinster, whereupon one-half of her personal estate devolved upon her sister, and was in pursuance of the settlement handed over to the trustees. In 1902 Charles Towry, Lord Ellenborough, died intestate and a bachelor, and letters of administration to his estate were granted to his sister, Emily Law, who was his heiress-at-law and sole next of kin. Emily Law was not desirous of bringing any further property into the settlement, and she now applied by originating summons, in the matter of Lord Ellenborough's estate and in the matter of the settlement for the determination of the question whether her interest as heiress-at-law and sole next of kin was effectually assigned to the trustees, and whether she bound to assign or transfer such interest. The Chancery Division of the High Court considered the case in 1903 and held that the trustees of the settlement could not compel Emily to hand over the property to the trustees.

== Ancestry ==
Ancestors of Charles Towry-Law, 3rd Baron Ellenborough

8. Rt Rev. Edmund Law
4. Edward Law, 1st Baron Ellenborough
9. Mary Christian (1721/1722 – 1762)
2. The Hon. Charles Law
10. Capt. George Towry
5. Ann Towry (died 1843)
1. Charles Towry-Law, 3rd Baron Ellenborough
12. Sir Gamaliel Nightingale, 9th Bt.
6. Sir Edward Nightingale, 10th Bt.
13. Maria Clossen (died 1789)
3. Elizabeth Nightingale (died 1864)
14. Robert Nightingale
7. Eleanor Nightingale (died 1825)

== Arms ==
Coat of arms of the Barons Ellenborough
Crest A cock gules charged on the breast with a mitre pendant from a chain round the neck or. Escutcheon Ermine on a bend engrailed between two cocks gules three mullets pierced or. Supporters Two eagles, wings elevated, sable, each gorged with a chain or, and pendant therefrom on the brest of the dexter supporter a mitre, and on the sinister a covered cup gold. Motto Compositum Jus Fasque Animi (Law and equity combined)

== Notes ==
Peerage of the United Kingdom
Preceded by Edward Law	Baron Ellenborough; 1871–1890; Member of the House of Lords (1871–1890)	Succeeded by Charles Towry-Law
