= Charles Law (British politician) =

British politician and judge

The Honourable Charles Law QC
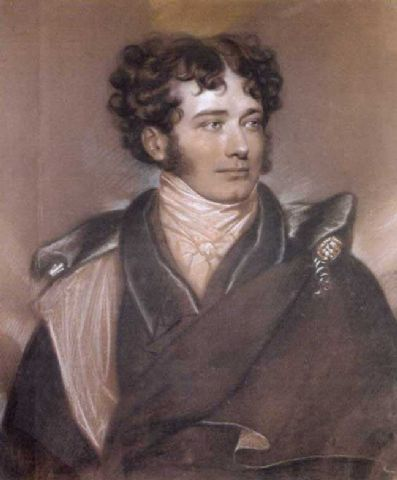
- Charles Ewan Law by Francis William Wilkin
- Born: Charles Ewan Law; 14 June 1792
- Died: 13 August 1850 (aged 58)
- Occupation(s): Judge, politician

The Honourable Charles Ewan Law (14 June 1792 – 13 August 1850) was a judge and Conservative Party politician in the United Kingdom.

== Background and education ==
Law was the second son of Edward Law, 1st Baron Ellenborough, by Anne Towry, daughter of Captain George Philip Towry, of Shipley, Northumberland. Edward Law, 1st Earl of Ellenborough, was his elder brother. He was educated at St John's College, Cambridge, graduating M.A. in 1812.

== Legal and political career ==
Law succeeded Newman Knowlys as Recorder of London in 1833 and was a Queen's Counsel. He claimed that Britain's constitutional history was that of a "Christian constitution" and supported the death penalty for un-Christian crimes, including sodomy. In total, he pronounced the sentence of death on 20 prisoners, including James Pratt and John Smith.

Law was returned to parliament as one of two representatives for Cambridge University in 1835, a seat he held until his death in 1850. While MP, Law opposed changes to prison reform, including changes to reduce Penal transportation and to reduce crimes that involved the death penalty.

== Family ==
Law married Elizabeth Sophia (1789–1864), daughter of Sir Edward Nightingale, 10th Baronet, first on 8 May 1811 at Gretna Green, Dumfriesshire, Scotland, and again on 22 May 1811. They had ten children:

- Anne Law (21 January 1815 – 17 February 1837)
- Mary Law (20 January 1816 – 23 April 1888), married John Browne, 3rd Baron Kilmaine
- Elizabeth Sophia Law (7 October 1817 – 5 December 1888), first abbess of the Poor Clares at Drumshanbo
- Edward Law (26 February 1819 – 1 July 1838)
- Charles Edmund Towry-Law, 3rd Baron Ellenborough (1820–1890)
- Selina Law (29 November 1822 – 12 July 1838)
- Frederica Law (19 September 1824 – 15 November 1889, married first Edmund Law (d. 1867) and second Henri Grève, had issue
- Emily Octavia Law (29 November 1825 – 28 September 1845)
- Gertrude Catherine Law (28 December 1828 – 22 June 1848)
- Henry Towry-Law (26 August 1830 – 7 November 1855)

Law died in August 1850, aged 58. His wife survived him by 14 years and died in June 1864.

Parliament of the United Kingdom
Preceded by Henry Goulburn; Charles Manners-Sutton	Member of Parliament for Cambridge University; 1835–1850; With: Henry Goulburn	Succeeded by Henry Goulburn; Loftus Wigram
