= Edward Law, 1st Baron Ellenborough =

Lord Chief Justice of England

The Right Honourable The Lord Ellenborough PC FSA
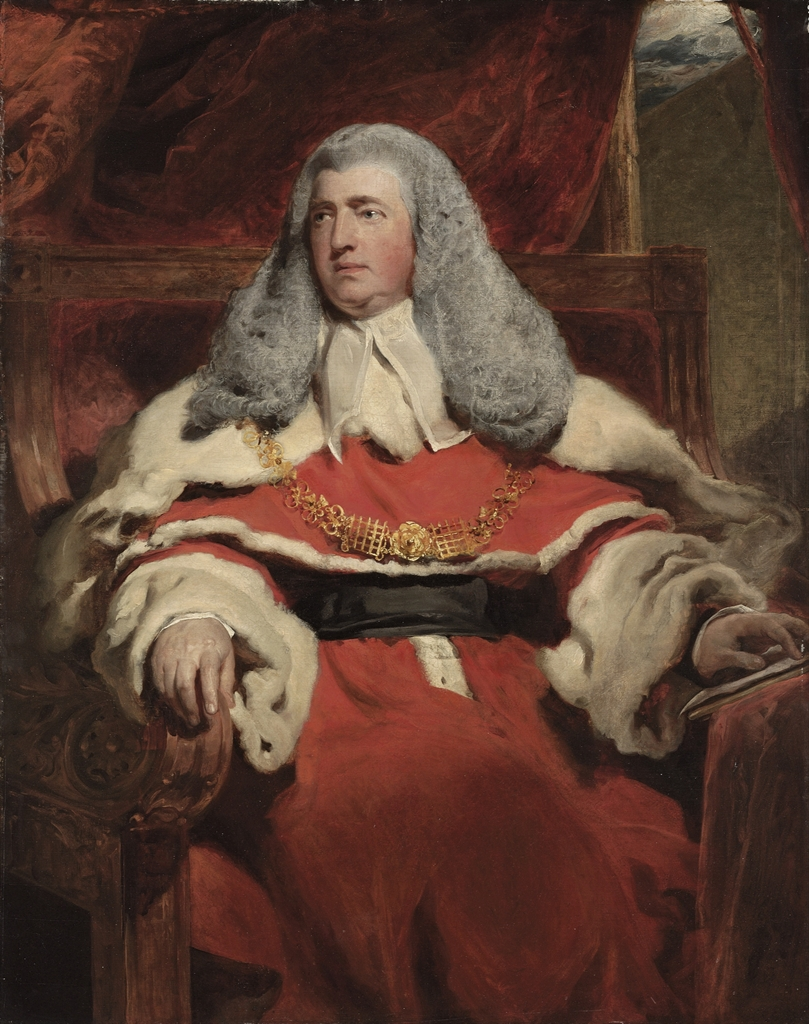
- Portrait by Thomas Lawrence

Lord Chief Justice
- In office 11 April 1802 – 2 November 1818
- Monarch: George III
- Preceded by: The Lord Kenyon
- Succeeded by: Charles Abbott

Member of the House of Lords
- Lord Temporal
- In office 17 April 1802 – 13 December 1818
- Preceded by: Peerage created
- Succeeded by: The 2nd Baron Ellenborough

Personal details
- Born: Edward Law; 16 November 1750 Great Salkeld, Cumberland, England, Great Britain
- Died: 13 December 1818 (aged 68) London, England, United Kingdom of Great Britain and Ireland
- Resting place: Charterhouse, London, England
- Spouse: Ann Towry (m. 1789)
- Children: 10, including Edward, Charles and Henry
- Parent: Edmund Law (father)

Edward Law, 1st Baron Ellenborough (16 November 1750 – 13 December 1818), was an English judge. After serving as a member of parliament and Attorney General, he became Lord Chief Justice.

== Early life ==
Law was born at Great Salkeld, in Cumberland, of which place his father, Edmund Law (1703–1787), afterwards Bishop of Carlisle, was at the time rector. His mother was Mary Christian, daughter of John Christan of Ewanrigg, Cumberland. Educated at the Charterhouse and at Peterhouse, Cambridge, he passed as third wrangler, and was soon afterwards elected to a fellowship at Trinity. In spite of his father's strong wish that he should take holy orders, he chose the legal profession, and on quitting the university was entered at Lincoln's Inn.

== Career ==
After spending five years as a special pleader under the bar, he was called to the bar in 1780. He chose the northern circuit, and in a very short time obtained a lucrative practice and a high reputation. In 1787 he was appointed principal counsel for Warren Hastings in the celebrated impeachment trial before the House of Lords, and the ability with which he conducted the defence was universally recognised. He was made a King's Counsel that year. In 1798, he was made a Fellow of the Society of Antiquaries of London.

He had begun his political career as a Whig, but, like many others, he saw in the French Revolution a reason for changing sides, and became a supporter of Pitt. On the formation of the Addington ministry in 1801, he was appointed Attorney General and shortly afterwards was returned to the House of Commons as Member of Parliament for Newtown in the Isle of Wight. He was knighted in the same year. In 1802 he succeeded Lord Kenyon as Lord Chief Justice of the King's Bench. On being raised to the bench he was created Baron Ellenborough, of Ellenborough, in the County in Cumberland, taken from the village where his maternal ancestors had long held a small patrimony.

In 1803, he presided over the treason trial of Colonel Edward Despard. In denying the jury's motion for clemency (following the character witness of Vice-Admiral Nelson) Lord Ellenborough emphasised the revolutionary nature of Despard's purpose. It was, he claimed, not only to rend the new union between Great Britain and Ireland, but also to affect "the forcible reduction to one common level of all the advantages of property, of all civil and political rights whatsoever".

Later that same year, 1803, he was appointed to the Privy Council of the United Kingdom. In 1803, he introduced a bill to Parliament which went on to become the Malicious Shooting or Stabbing Act 1803 (often referred to as Lord Ellenborough's Act) which clarified the law on abortion in England and Ireland.

In 1806, on the death of William Pitt the Younger, Lord Ellenborough served as Chancellor of the Exchequer for two weeks ad interim. On the formation of Lord Grenville's ministry "of all the talents", Lord Ellenborough declined the offer of the office of Lord Chancellor, but accepted a seat in the cabinet. In February 1806 he found former Governor Thomas Picton guilty of the torture of Luisa Calderon.

Lord Ellenborough was a strong proponent of the Bloody Code. On 2 April 1813, in opposition to a bill introduced by Samuel Romilly proposing the abolition of the death penalty for the crime of stealing more than five shillings from a shop, Ellenborough said:

If your Lordships look to the particular measure now under consideration, can it, I ask, be seriously maintained, that the most exemplary punishment, and the best suited to prevent the commission of this crime, ought not to be a punishment which might in some cases be inflicted? How, but by the enactments of the law now sought to be repealed, are the cottages of industrious poverty protected? What other security has a poor peasant, when he and his wife leave their home for their daily labours, that on their return their few articles of furniture or of clothes which they possess besides those which they carry on their backs, will be safe? . . . By the enacting of the punishment of death, and leaving it to the discretion of the Crown to inflict that punishment or not, as the circumstances of the case may require, I am satisfied, and I am much mistaken if your Lordships are not satisfied, that this object is attained with the least possible expenditure. That the law is, as it has been termed, a bloody law, I can by no means admit. Can there be a better test than by a consideration of the number of persons who have been executed for offences of the description contained in the present Bill? Your Lordships are told, what is extremely true, that this number is very small; and this very circumstance is urged as a reason for a repeal of the law; but, before your Lordships are induced to consent to such repeal, I beg to call to your consideration the number of innocent persons who might have been plundered of their property or destroyed by midnight murderers, if the law now sought to be repealed had not been in existence: -- a law upon which all the retail trade of this commercial country depends; and which I for one will not consent to be put in jeopardy.

The speech is widely cited both to contextualize the attitude towards crime in Britain in the 18th and early 19th centuries and in opposition to modern capital punishment laws.

Being in the cabinet while he retained the chief justiceship was much criticised at the time, and, though not without precedent, was open to such obvious objections on constitutional grounds that the experiment was never repeated. As a judge, his decisions displayed profound legal knowledge, and in mercantile law especially were reckoned of high authority. He was harsh and overbearing to counsel, and in the political trials which were so frequent in his time, such as that of Lord Cochrane for Stock Exchange fraud in 1814, showed an unmistakable bias against the accused. In the trial of William Hone for blasphemy in 1817, Ellenborough directed the jury to find a verdict of guilty, and their acquittal of the prisoner is generally said to have hastened his death.

On the other hand, his humane and enlightened judgment in R. v. Inhabitants of Eastbourne that destitute French refugees in England have a fundamental human right to be given sufficient means to enable them to live, has been much praised and frequently followed. In the field of copyright, his judgment in Cary v Kearsley that "a man may fairly adopt part of the work of another for the promotion of science.....one must not put manacles on science" was extremely influential in developing the doctrine of fair use. He resigned his judicial office in November 1818, and died shortly after.

== Family ==
Lord Ellenborough married, on 17 October 1789, Ann Towry (1769–1843), the daughter of George Phillips Towry of Foliejon Park at Winkfield in Berkshire and his wife, Elizabeth. They had five sons and five daughters who survived infancy:

- Hon. Elizabeth Susan (d. 31 March 1883) married Charles Abbot, 2nd Baron Colchester. They had one son, Reginald
- Hon. Anne (d. 30 May 1852) married Adm. John Colville, 9th Lord Colville. They had no children.
- Hon. Mary Frederica (d. 16 September 1851) married Lt.-Gen. Thomas Dyneley on 10 July 1827. They had three sons and one daughter.
- Hon. Frederica Selina (d. 16 April 1879) married Capt. Henry James Ramsden, son of Sir John Ramsden, 4th Baronet. They had five sons and four daughters.
- Edward Law, 1st Earl of Ellenborough (8 September 1790 – 22 December 1871)
- Hon. Charles Ewan (14 June 1792 – 13 August 1850)
- Hon. Henry Spencer (10 May 1802 – 15 July 1885)
- Hon. William Towry (16 June 1809 – 31 October 1886) was married twice. Firstly to Hon. Augusta Champagne Graves, daughter of Thomas Graves, 2nd Baron Graves, on 15 March 1831. Two years after her death he married secondly, Matilda Montgomery, daughter of Sir Conyngham Montgomery, 1st Baronet, on 25 January 1846. He had five sons, one daughter with Augusta and two more sons and a daughter with Matilda.
- Hon. Frances Henrietta (11 February 1812 – 2 March 1894) married twice. Firstly, Charles Des Voeux, son of Sir Charles Des Voeux, 2nd Baronet, on 8 March 1832. Charles died a little over a year later, and Frances married secondly Sir Robert Dallas, 2nd Baronet, on 29 September 1841. With Sir Robert, she had at least one daughter.

He was succeeded as second baron by his eldest son, Edward, later the Earl of Ellenborough; another son, Charles, was Recorder of London and Member of Parliament for Cambridge University UK 1835 until his death.

Three of Ellenborough's brothers attained some degree of fame. These were John Law (1745–1810), Bishop of Elphin; Thomas Law (1759–1834), who settled in the United States in 1793, and married, as his second wife, Eliza Custis, a granddaughter of Martha Washington; and George Henry Law (1761–1845), Bishop of Chester and of Bath and Wells. The connection of the Law family with the English Church was kept up by George Henry's sons, three of whom took orders. Two of these were Henry Law (1797–1884), Dean of Gloucester, and James Thomas Law (1790–1876), chancellor of the Diocese of Lichfield.

== Arms ==
Coat of arms of the Barons Ellenborough
Crest A cock gules charged on the breast with a mitre pendant from a chain round the neck or. Escutcheon Ermine on a bend engrailed between two cocks gules three mullets pierced or. Supporters Two eagles, wings elevated, sable, each gorged with a chain or, and pendant therefrom on the brest of the dexter supporter a mitre, and on the sinister a covered cup gold. Motto Compositum Jus Fasque Animi (Law and equity combined)

== Footnotes ==
Parliament of the United Kingdom
Preceded by Sir Richard Worsley, Bt; Charles Shaw-Lefevre	Member of Parliament for Newtown; 1801–1802; With: Charles Shaw-Lefevre	Succeeded by Charles Shaw-Lefevre; Ewan Law
Legal offices
Preceded by Sir John Mitford	Attorney General; 1801–1802	Succeeded by Hon. Spencer Perceval
Preceded by The Lord Kenyon	Lord Chief Justice, King's Bench; 1802–1818	Succeeded by Charles Abbott
Peerage of the United Kingdom
New creation	Baron Ellenborough; 1802–1818; Member of the House of Lords (1802–1818)	Succeeded by Edward Law
