= Ellenborough, Cumbria =

Suburb of Maryport, Cumbria, England

Coordinates: 54.708°N 3.481°W

Ellenborough
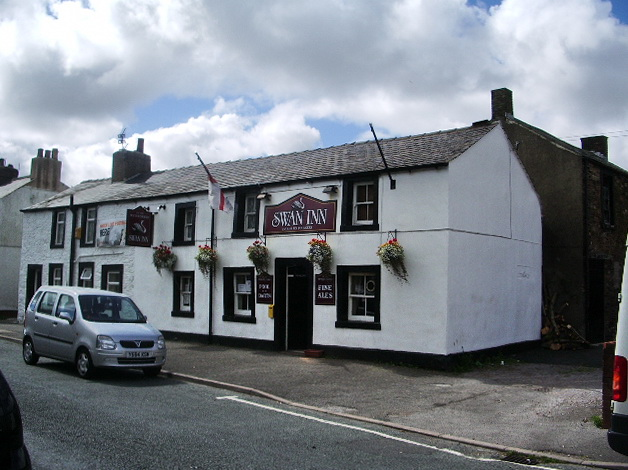
- The Swan Inn public house, Ellenborough

- Location in Allerdale, Cumbria Location within Cumbria
- OS grid reference: NY045357
- Civil parish: Maryport
- Unitary authority: Cumberland
- Ceremonial county: Cumbria
- Region: North West
- Country: England
- Sovereign state: United Kingdom
- Post town: MARYPORT
- Postcode district: CA15
- Dialling code: 01900
- Police: Cumbria
- Fire: Cumbria
- Ambulance: North West
- UK Parliament: Penrith and Solway

Ellenborough is a suburb of the town of Maryport, Cumbria, England, historically within Cumberland.

It takes its name from the nearby River Ellen. The population of the electoral ward taken at the 2011 census was 3,810.

== Governance ==
Ellenborough is in the parliamentary constituency of Penrith and Solway.

For Local Government purposes it is in the Cumberland unitary authority area.

Ellenborough does not have its own parish council, instead it is governed by Maryport Town Council.

== Transport ==
For transport there is the A594 going through the settlement and the A596 nearby; Maryport railway station is nearby.

== Nearby settlements ==
Other suburbs of Maryport include Ewanrigg, Netherton and Glasson.
