= Henry Spencer Law =

British barrister

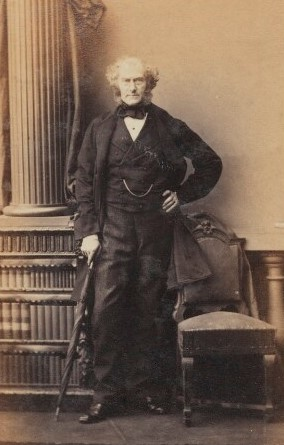
Hon. Henry Spencer Law by Camille Silvy

Henry Spencer Law DL (10 May 1802 – 15 July 1885) was a British jurist and the son of Lord Chief Justice Edward Law, 1st Baron Ellenborough

== Early life ==
He was the fifth son of Edward Law, 1st Baron Ellenborough, and Anne Towry. He graduated from Cambridge University with a Master of Arts (M.A.).

== Career ==
He was a practising barrister at the Inner Temple, and was called to the bar in Michaelmas term, 1833. He served in the Life Guards and 28th Regiment. Law was a barrister and Private Secretary to his brother Edward Law, 1st Earl of Ellenborough, when First Lord of the Admiralty in 1846 and President of the Board of Control in 1858.

He was appointed as a justice of the Liberty of the Cinque Ports in 1850. He held the office of Deputy Lieutenant (D.L.) of Kent, to which he was appointed in 1853. He was also Clerk of the Docquets (or Dockets) until the abolition of that office, when he was awarded a pension.

== Personal life ==
Law married on 16 May 1839 Dorothea Anne Rochfort (d. 25 November 1871), eldest daughter of Col. John Staunton Rochfort, of Clogrennane Castle, County Carlow, by his wife Mary Burgh, and had issue:

1. Edward Downes Law, 5th Baron Ellenborough
2. Horatio "Horace" John Law born 12 October 1843, died 2 July 1855 in Lowndes Street, Middlesex, and was buried at Kensal Green.
3. Cecil Henry Law, 6th Baron Ellenborough
4. Louisa Isabella Law (died on 14 October 1899)
5. Hon. Ethel Beatrice Law (granted the style and precedence of a Baron's daughter by royal warrant 1902, Sister of the Community of Bethany, Lloyd's Square, London WC1, and died on 13 November 1937)

Law died on 15 July 1885 and is buried in Brompton Cemetery.
