= Fitzhardinge Portman =

Church of England priest

Fitzhardinge Berkeley Portman (born Bryanston 1811 – died Orchard Portman 1893) was a British Church of England priest, most notably Archdeacon of Wells from 1862 until 1863.

Portman was educated at Christ Church, Oxford, where he matriculated in 1828, and at All Souls' College, where he graduated B.A. in 1823, and was a Fellow from 1831 to 1841. He was ordained deacon in 1835, and priest in 1836. He was a Fellow of All Souls College, Oxford until 1840, in which year he became Rector of Staple Fitzpaine.

He died on 6 March 1893.

Church of England titles
Preceded by Henry Law	Archdeacon of Wells; 1862–1863	Succeeded by Otway Fitzgerald
