= William Burkitt =

William Burkitt (25 July 1650 in Hitcham, Suffolk, England – 24 October 1703 in Essex) was a biblical expositor, educational pioneer, rector of Milden, Suffolk, and vicar and lecturer of Dedham, Essex, in England.

== Life ==
His father was Michael, usually called Miles, Burkitt (otherwise Birkhead), of St. Edmund Hall, Oxford, a clergyman who began his career as a zealous high-churchman, and ended his days in nonconformity. At the Restoration, Miles Burkitt lost the well-endowed rectory of Hitcham. Some time afterwards he was presented to the rectories of Irstead and Neatishead, Norfolk, but was ejected within three months by the Act of Uniformity (1662). He also lost the manor of Monks Eleigh, Suffolk, belonging to the dean and chapter of Canterbury, which he had purchased from the Commonwealth Commissioners, and which cost him, with improvements, £2500, he continued to live at Monks Eleigh, and ultimately prospered; ‘Though,' he said, ‘I have lost many scores of pounds by my nonconformity, yet, blessed be God, I never wanted.' His wife was a Sparrow, of Rede (Reade), Suffolk. He was buried in Monks Eleigh on 24 Sep. 1669.

William Burkitt’s tradition was that of a reformed Anglican churchman. His early training was under John Goffe, an alumnus of Pembroke Hall, Cambridge, at Bildeston, Suffolk, and then at the grammar school of Stowmarket and the Perse School, Cambridge, under George Griffiths. He dated his religious conversion from an attack of small-pox, while at the latter school.

On 28 January 1665 he was admitted a sizar at Pembroke Hall, Cambridge, his tutor being William Gibbs. In 1666, when Cambridge was visited with the plague, he was one of the few students who remained in residence. He graduated B.A. in 1668, M.A. in 1672; but was never a fellow, as has been stated.

He left the university to become chaplain at Bildeston Hall, and after this was ordained by Bishop Reynolds at a very early age; for either in 1671, the year of his majority, or at the beginning of 1672, he was settled at Milden, Suffolk, first as curate in charge, afterwards as rector. In December 1692, he was preferred to the vicarage and lectureship of Dedham, Essex, where he ended his days. While at Milden he was intimate with William Gurnall, rector of the neighbouring parish of Lavenham, the author of ‘The Christian in Compleat Armour,’ and in 1679 preached his funeral sermon.

He preached also in 1691 a violent sermon at Lavenham against some Baptists, who, under one Tredwell from London, were ‘making proselytes by rebaptising them in a nasty horsepond.' Burkitt went to the barn in which the Baptist meeting was held, and repeated his exhortation there. More commendable was his attitude towards the French protestant exiles. His generous efforts in their behalf, begun at midsummer 1687, and continued till 1692, resulted in the raising of £216. 17s., which he personally distributed to needy refugees in Suffolk and Essex.

He exhibited also a zeal for foreign missions; by his great care, pains, an charges, he procured a pious minister to go and settle in Carolina. Possibly this was one of the ‘poor students’ towards whose maintenance at Cambridge he liberally contributed. He was exceedingly charitable, and was diligent in his pastoral duties, preaching three times a week (besides village services) in a plain style with a winning voice, visiting and catechising with assiduity, and, though greatly attached to the prayer-book, constantly using the liberty of extemporary prayer before sermon. His character was somewhat wanting in geniality. A malignant fever carried him off in a week's time.

He died on Sunday, 24 October 1703, leaving a widow, and having married three times. His funeral sermon was preached by his brother-in-law, Nathaniel Parkhurst M.A., vicar of Yoxford, Suffolk. He bequeathed his house and some land as a residence for the lecturer at Dedham.

== Works ==
- ‘A Sermon reached soon after the solemn Enterrment of Mr. William Gurnall,’ 1680, 4to (from Heb. xiii. 7).
- ‘An Argumentative and Practical Discourse on Infant Baptism,' 1692; reprinted 1722, 12mo (this was the substance of his Lavenham sermon, 1691; the preface gives a minute account of the circumstances it was answered by Benjamin Keach, of the ‘Scripture Metaphors) 1681, in ‘The Rector rectified and corrected; or Infant Baptism Unlawful,' 1692, Bvo).
- ‘The Poor Man’s Help, and Young Man’s Guide . . . unto which is added an earnest Exhortation . . .‘ 5th ed. 1701, 8vo; 6th od. 1705, 8vo; another ed. 1715, 8vo; 32nd ed., with title, ‘ A Help and Guide to Christian Families,’ &c., 1764, 8vo, has a supplement of forms of prayer and hymns, with separate title-page.
- ‘Family Instruction, a Catechism, explaining . . . the great and necessary Doctrines of Faith and Holiness’ (Middleton).
- ‘ Explanatory Notes, with Practical Observations on the four Evangelistsf 1700 fol.(Watt).
- ‘Expository Notes, with Practical Observations on the New Testament’ (issued posthumously), 1724, fol. (portrait by White); other editions are 1739, 1784, 1739, 1752, 1753, 1760, 1772, 1779, all folio; 1814, 1819, Alto; abridged by Samuel Glasse, D.D., 1806, 4to, 2 vols.; another abridgment in one vol. 8vo (on this work Burkitt's reputation rests; its character is that of a compilation, the original matter being mainly the author's sermon notes; the work has sometimes been accused of heterodoxy. Doddridge says the ‘sentiments vary in different parts of the work, as the authors from whom he took his materials were orthodox or not').

Charles Spurgeon regarded Burkitt's commentary as a "goodly volume," and recommended "attentive perusal" of it.
