= Listed buildings in Milden, Suffolk =

Civil Parish in Suffolk, England

Milden is a village and civil parish in the Babergh District of Suffolk, England. It contains 18 listed buildings that are recorded in the National Heritage List for England. Of these one is grade I, one is grade II* and 16 are grade II.

This list is based on the information retrieved online from Historic England.

== Key ==
Grade	Criteria
I	Buildings that are of exceptional interest
II*	Particularly important buildings of more than special interest
II	Buildings that are of special interest

== Listing ==
Name	Grade	Location	Type	Completed (Note: The date given is the date used by Historic England as significant for the initial building or that of an important part in the structure's description.)	Date designated	Grid ref. (Note: The grid reference is based on the British national grid reference system, sometimes known as OSGB36, used by the Ordnance Survey.) Geo-coordinates	Notes	Entry number (Note: The "List Entry Number" is a unique number assigned to each listed building and scheduled monument by Historic England.)	Image	Wikidata
Barns to the South East of Milden Hall	II				10 July 1980	TL9447346247; 52°04′49″N 0°50′12″E		1037113	Upload Photo	Q26288810
Church of St Peter	I		church building		23 January 1958	TL9584446541; 52°04′57″N 0°51′25″E		1037111	Church of St Peter More images	Q17541838
Milden Hall	II*				23 January 1958	TL9443046274; 52°04′50″N 0°50′10″E		1181918	Upload Photo	Q17533700
Moat Farmhouse	II				10 July 1980	TL9601346695; 52°05′02″N 0°51′34″E		1037112	Upload Photo	Q26288809
1 and 2 Pound Farm Cottages	II	1 and 2 Pound Farm Cottages, Boxford Road			10 July 1980	TL9539345636; 52°04′29″N 0°50′59″E		1284768	Upload Photo	Q26573512
Barn and Outbuilding to the North of Owl's Farmhouse	II	Boxford Road			10 July 1980	TL9575444792; 52°04′01″N 0°51′16″E		1037116	Upload Photo	Q26288814
Lower Farmhouse	II	Boxford Road			10 July 1980	TL9581444532; 52°03′52″N 0°51′19″E		1181931	Upload Photo	Q26477209
Owl's Farmhouse	II	Boxford Road			10 July 1980	TL9575144781; 52°04′00″N 0°51′16″E		1037115	Upload Photo	Q26288812
Sunrise and Brickpath	II	Boxford Road			10 July 1980	TL9535245419; 52°04′22″N 0°50′56″E		1037114	Upload Photo	Q26288811
Webb's Farmhouse	II	Boxford Road			10 July 1980	TL9568444988; 52°04′07″N 0°51′13″E		1181927	Upload Photo	Q26477205
Rushbrook Farmhouse	II	Church Road			10 July 1980	TL9558846442; 52°04′54″N 0°51′11″E		1037117	Upload Photo	Q26288815
The Old Rectory	II	Drury Lane			23 January 1958	TL9575246428; 52°04′54″N 0°51′19″E		1181942	Upload Photo	Q26477220
Wells Hall	II	Milden Road			10 July 1980	TL9463847350; 52°05′25″N 0°50′23″E		1193941	Upload Photo	Q26488580
Barn and Outbuildings to the North of Valley Farmhouse	II	Monks Eleigh Road			10 July 1980	TL9431246642; 52°05′02″N 0°50′04″E		1181948	Upload Photo	Q26477225
Valley Farmhouse	II	Monks Eleigh Road			10 July 1980	TL9432646618; 52°05′02″N 0°50′05″E		1037118	Upload Photo	Q26288816
Serens Hall	II	Pound Lane	building		10 July 1980	TL9576745937; 52°04′38″N 0°51′19″E		1037119	Serens Hall More images	Q26288817
Milden Cottage	II	Powney Street	thatched cottage		10 July 1980	TL9516746225; 52°04′48″N 0°50′48″E		1284784	Milden Cottage More images	Q26573528
Pyghtle Cottages	II	Rectory Corner			10 July 1980	TL9569146448; 52°04′54″N 0°51′16″E		1351542	Upload Photo	Q26634632

== See also ==
- Grade I listed buildings in Suffolk
- Grade II* listed buildings in Suffolk

== Sources ==
- Bettely, James; Pevsner, Nikolaus (2015) [1961], Suffolk: West, The Buildings of England, New Haven and London: Yale University Press, ISBN 978-0-300-19655-9
