= John Turnbull (priest) =

John William Turnbull (29 August 1905 – 20 August 1979) was an English Anglican priest.

== Early life ==
The 2nd son of William and Elizabeth Turnbull, he was educated at Durham University and Edinburgh Theological College.

== Religious life ==
- Ordained Deacon, 1934
- Ordained, Priest 1935
- Curate of Horton, Northumberland, 1934–36
- Curate of Alnwick, 1936–41
- Vicar of Longbenton, 1941–48
- Vicar of All Saints’, Gosforth, 1948–62
- Canon Residentiary of Ripon Cathedral, 1962–76
- Archdeacon of Richmond, 1962–76 from 1962 to 1976.

Church of England titles
Preceded by Henry Burrans Graham	Archdeacon of Richmond; 1962–1976	Succeeded by John Paul Burbridge
