= Listed buildings in Hitcham, Suffolk =

Historic structures in Suffolk, England

Hitcham is a village and civil parish in the Babergh District of Suffolk, England. It contains 61 listed buildings that are recorded in the National Heritage List for England. Of these one is grade I, one is grade II* and 59 are grade II.

This list is based on the information retrieved online from Historic England.

== Key ==
Grade	Criteria
I	Buildings that are of exceptional interest
II*	Particularly important buildings of more than special interest
II	Buildings that are of special interest

== Listing ==
Name	Grade	Location	Type	Completed (Note: The date given is the date used by Historic England as significant for the initial building or that of an important part in the structure's description.)	Date designated	Grid ref. (Note: The grid reference is based on the British national grid reference system, sometimes known as OSGB36, used by the Ordnance Survey.) Geo-coordinates	Notes	Entry number (Note: The "List Entry Number" is a unique number assigned to each listed building and scheduled monument by Historic England.)	Image	Wikidata
Church of All Saints	I		church building		23 January 1958	TL9845051105; 52°07′21″N 0°53′51″E		1285593	Church of All Saints More images	Q17542356
Dale Farmhouse	II				10 July 1980	TL9785952563; 52°08′09″N 0°53′23″E		1037293	Upload Photo	Q26288999
Dale House	II				10 July 1980	TL9780352222; 52°07′58″N 0°53′19″E		1194710	Upload Photo	Q26489324
Hitcham Hall	II				10 July 1980	TL9837751213; 52°07′25″N 0°53′47″E		1285560	Upload Photo	Q26574245
Hitcham House	II				23 January 1958	TL9791350774; 52°07′11″N 0°53′22″E		1351468	Upload Photo	Q26634571
Little Causeway Farmhouse	II	B115			24 April 1990	TL9875251863; 52°07′46″N 0°54′08″E		1037019	Upload Photo	Q26288703
Old Bloxhall House	II				10 July 1980	TL9724652573; 52°08′10″N 0°52′51″E		1194714	Upload Photo	Q26489328
Old House	II				23 January 1958	TL9843851027; 52°07′19″N 0°53′50″E		1037292	Upload Photo	Q26288998
Wetherden Old Hall	II				27 November 1972	TL9719751036; 52°07′21″N 0°52′45″E		1351469	Upload Photo	Q26634572
Laurels Farm Cottage	II	Battisford Road			10 July 1980	TM0056453790; 52°08′45″N 0°55′48″E		1037294	Upload Photo	Q26289000
Holly Tree Cottage	II	Bird Street, Ipswich, IP7 7LZ			10 July 1980	TM0075052944; 52°08′18″N 0°55′56″E		1037261	Upload Photo	Q26288958
5, Bury Road	II	5, Bury Road			10 July 1980	TL9686352134; 52°07′57″N 0°52′30″E		1037295	Upload Photo	Q26289001
Barn Circa 30 Metres East of Brickhouse Farmhouse	II	Bury Road			10 December 1987	TL9806151351; 52°07′30″N 0°53′31″E		1351611	Upload Photo	Q26634697
Brickhouse Farmhouse	II	Bury Road			23 January 1958	TL9802951359; 52°07′30″N 0°53′29″E		1351470	Upload Photo	Q26634573
Hill Farm Barn	II	Bury Road			10 June 1986	TL9765151816; 52°07′45″N 0°53′10″E		1037015	Upload Photo	Q26288697
Holmwood	II	Bury Road			10 July 1980	TL9686052079; 52°07′55″N 0°52′29″E		1194768	Upload Photo	Q26489380
Church Cottage	II	Church Lane			10 July 1980	TL9848951039; 52°07′19″N 0°53′53″E		1351491	Upload Photo	Q26634591
Friday Lane Cottage	II	Church Lane			10 July 1980	TL9852051024; 52°07′19″N 0°53′54″E		1351492	Upload Photo	Q26634592
Hedgerows	II	Church Lane			10 July 1980	TL9850551012; 52°07′18″N 0°53′54″E		1037257	Upload Photo	Q26288953
Ennals Farmhouse	II	Cooks Green			23 January 1958	TL9832453299; 52°08′33″N 0°53′49″E		1037258	Upload Photo	Q26288954
Sefton Cottage	II	Cooks Green			10 July 1980	TL9800353389; 52°08′36″N 0°53′32″E		1351493	Upload Photo	Q26634593
Stanstead Hall Farmhouse	II	Cooks Green			10 July 1980	TL9827653745; 52°08′47″N 0°53′47″E		1037260	Upload Photo	Q26288957
Syers Field	II	Cooks Green			10 July 1980	TL9805353406; 52°08′36″N 0°53′35″E		1037259	Upload Photo	Q26288956
Cross Green Cottage	II	Cross Green			10 July 1980	TL9890652943; 52°08′20″N 0°54′19″E		1194803	Upload Photo	Q26489420
Cross Green House	II	Cross Green			10 July 1980	TL9864453019; 52°08′23″N 0°54′05″E		1285528	Upload Photo	Q26574215
Hillcrest and Mowle's Cottage	II	Cross Green, IP7 7LL, Cross Grenn			10 July 1980	TL9897652923; 52°08′20″N 0°54′22″E		1285524	Upload Photo	Q26574211
Mere Cottage	II	Cross Green			10 July 1980	TL9867253014; 52°08′23″N 0°54′07″E		1037264	Upload Photo	Q26288961
Oak Cottage	II	Cross Green			10 July 1980	TL9873153030; 52°08′23″N 0°54′10″E		1285530	Upload Photo	Q26574217
Rambul Cottage	II	Cross Green			10 July 1980	TL9872552998; 52°08′22″N 0°54′09″E		1037263	Upload Photo	Q26288960
Stable Block to Cross Green House	II	Cross Green			10 July 1980	TL9861953037; 52°08′24″N 0°54′04″E		1037265	Upload Photo	Q26288962
The Cottage	II	Cross Green			10 July 1980	TL9897852934; 52°08′20″N 0°54′22″E		1351494	Upload Photo	Q26685433
The Cottage	II	Fen Lane			10 July 1980	TL9855050961; 52°07′17″N 0°53′56″E		1037266	Upload Photo	Q26288963
2 Barns Approx.30m North-east of Fenn Farmhouse	II	2 Barns Approx.30m North-east Of Fenn Farmhouse, Fenn Lane			19 July 2002	TL9925650978; 52°07′16″N 0°54′33″E		1061380	Upload Photo	Q26314594
Cartshed Approx.40m North of Fenn Farmhouse	II	Fenn Lane			19 July 2002	TL9923950999; 52°07′17″N 0°54′32″E		1061381	Upload Photo	Q26314597
Fenn Farmhouse	II	Fenn Lane			19 July 2002	TL9923450954; 52°07′16″N 0°54′32″E		1061379	Upload Photo	Q26314591
Peppertree Farm Barn (former Kitchen)	II*	Ipswich, IP7 7NY			15 May 2025	TL9791053462; 52°08′38″N 0°53′27″E		1491688	Upload Photo	Q136386095
Peppertree Farm Farmhouse	II	Ipswich, IP7 7NY			15 May 2025	TL9789953452; 52°08′38″N 0°53′27″E		1491686	Upload Photo	Q136386094
Luckeys Farmhouse	II	Luckeys Corner			10 July 1980	TL9977353964; 52°08′52″N 0°55′06″E		1194811	Upload Photo	Q26489428
Wheelwrights Cottage	II	Luckeys Corner			10 July 1980	TL9971853996; 52°08′53″N 0°55′04″E		1037267	Upload Photo	Q26288964
Gayhurst	II	The Causeway			10 July 1980	TL9884652469; 52°08′05″N 0°54′15″E		1037256	Upload Photo	Q26288952
Great Causeway Farmhouse	II	The Causeway			10 July 1980	TL9868551657; 52°07′39″N 0°54′04″E		1037296	Upload Photo	Q26289003
Layer Marney	II	The Causeway			27 September 1977	TL9875452064; 52°07′52″N 0°54′09″E		1037255	Upload Photo	Q26288951
Lower Farm Cottage Squirrels Cottage	II	The Causeway			10 July 1980	TL9873351787; 52°07′43″N 0°54′07″E		1351471	Upload Photo	Q26634574
Mill Cottage	II	The Causeway			10 July 1980	TL9861751566; 52°07′36″N 0°54′01″E		1285551	Upload Photo	Q26574238
North Oak Cottage South Oak Cottage	II	The Causeway			10 July 1980	TL9890152528; 52°08′07″N 0°54′18″E		1194774	Upload Photo	Q26489385
Oakdene	II	The Causeway			10 July 1980	TL9860851626; 52°07′38″N 0°54′00″E		1351472	Upload Photo	Q26634575
Primrose Cottage and Tudor Beams	II	The Causeway			10 July 1980	TL9873951974; 52°07′49″N 0°54′08″E		1037298	Upload Photo	Q26289005
The Chimney House	II	The Causeway			10 July 1980	TL9880852071; 52°07′52″N 0°54′12″E		1194772	Upload Photo	Q26489383
Town Cottage	II	The Causeway			10 July 1980	TL9879152325; 52°08′00″N 0°54′11″E		1351490	Upload Photo	Q26634590
Tudor House	II	The Causeway			10 July 1980	TL9890052513; 52°08′06″N 0°54′17″E		1037297	Upload Photo	Q26289004
Bridge Cottage	II	The Street			10 July 1980	TL9822251292; 52°07′28″N 0°53′39″E		1037268	Upload Photo	Q26288966
Brook Cottage	II	The Street	cottage		10 July 1980	TL9824251289; 52°07′28″N 0°53′40″E		1037269	Brook Cottage More images	Q26288967
The Stores	II	The Street			10 July 1980	TL9833451324; 52°07′29″N 0°53′45″E		1194828	Upload Photo	Q26489445
The White Horse Inn	II	The Street	inn		10 July 1980	TL9820851263; 52°07′27″N 0°53′38″E		1194824	The White Horse Inn More images	Q26489441
Bridge Cottage	II	Water Run			10 July 1980	TL9938353531; 52°08′39″N 0°54′45″E		1037271	Upload Photo	Q26288969
Bristol Flower Thatch Rose Cottage the Ranch	II	Water Run			10 July 1980	TL9934853323; 52°08′32″N 0°54′43″E		1285501	Upload Photo	Q26574191
Bush Farmhouse	II	Water Run			10 July 1980	TL9911752966; 52°08′21″N 0°54′30″E		1194799	Upload Photo	Q26489416
Fir Tree Cottage	II	Water Run			10 July 1980	TL9926053212; 52°08′29″N 0°54′38″E		1037270	Upload Photo	Q26288968
Mill House	II	Water Run			10 July 1980	TL9907453036; 52°08′23″N 0°54′28″E		1037262	Upload Photo	Q26288959
The Cottage	II	Water Run			10 July 1980	TL9938153462; 52°08′36″N 0°54′45″E		1180339	Upload Photo	Q26475549
Windyridge	II	Wattisham Road			10 July 1980	TM0037653422; 52°08′34″N 0°55′37″E		1194796	Upload Photo	Q26489413

== See also ==
- Grade I listed buildings in Suffolk
- Grade II* listed buildings in Suffolk

== Sources ==
- Bettely, James; Pevsner, Nikolaus (2015) [1961], Suffolk: West, The Buildings of England, New Haven and London: Yale University Press, ISBN 978-0-300-19655-9
