= Listed buildings in Monks Eleigh =

Civil Parish in Suffolk, England

Monks Eleigh is a village and civil parish in the Babergh District of Suffolk, England. It contains 62 listed buildings that are recorded in the National Heritage List for England. Of these one is grade I, one is grade II* and 60 are grade II.

This list is based on the information retrieved online from Historic England.

== Key ==
| Grade | Criteria |
|---|---|
| I | Buildings that are of exceptional interest |
| II* | Particularly important buildings of more than special interest |
| II | Buildings that are of special interest |

== Listing ==
| Name | Grade | Location | Type | Completed (Note: The date given is the date used by Historic England as significant for the initial building or that of an important part in the structure's description.) | Date designated | Grid ref. (Note: The grid reference is based on the British national grid reference system, sometimes known as OSGB36, used by the Ordnance Survey.) Geo-coordinates | Notes | Entry number (Note: The "List Entry Number" is a unique number assigned to each listed building and scheduled monument by Historic England.) | Image | Wikidata |
|---|---|---|---|---|---|---|---|---|---|---|
| Manor Farmhouse | II | | | | 23 January 1958 | TL9621748026; 52°05′45″N 0°51′47″E | | 1181979 | Upload Photo | Q26477257 |
| Monks Eleigh Hall | II | | country house | | 23 January 1958 | TL9667447723; 52°05′34″N 0°52′11″E | | 1037120 | Monks Eleigh Hall More images | Q26288818 |
| Brereton Rosslyne | II | Back Lane | | | 10 July 1980 | TL9666047260; 52°05′19″N 0°52′09″E | | 1182014 | Upload Photo | Q26477292 |
| Brettes | II | Back Lane | | | 10 July 1980 | TL9660247237; 52°05′19″N 0°52′06″E | | 1182001 | Upload Photo | Q26477279 |
| Churches Old Bakehouse | II | Back Lane | | | 10 July 1980 | TL9626147288; 52°05′21″N 0°51′48″E | | 1284761 | Churches Old Bakehouse | Q26573506 |
| Hobarts | II | Back Lane | | | 23 January 1958 | TL9632347266; 52°05′20″N 0°51′51″E | | 1351543 | Hobarts More images | Q26634633 |
| Rose Cottage Trent Cottage | II | Back Lane | | | 10 July 1980 | TL9663447248; 52°05′19″N 0°52′07″E | | 1037122 | Upload Photo | Q26288820 |
| Lanes End | II | Brent Eleigh Road | | | 10 July 1980 | TL9649747567; 52°05′30″N 0°52′01″E | | 1037123 | Lanes End More images | Q26288821 |
| Spring Cottage | II | Brent Eleigh Road | | | 10 July 1980 | TL9645047570; 52°05′30″N 0°51′58″E | | 1037124 | Spring Cottage More images | Q26288822 |
| The Manse | II | Brent Eleigh Road | clergy house | | 10 July 1980 | TL9656247594; 52°05′30″N 0°52′04″E | | 1351544 | The Manse More images | Q26634634 |
| 12, Church Hill | II | 12, Church Hill | | | 10 July 1980 | TL9661247623; 52°05′31″N 0°52′07″E | | 1182038 | 12, Church Hill More images | Q26477316 |
| Ansell Cottage | II | Church Hill | | | 10 July 1980 | TL9656347600; 52°05′31″N 0°52′04″E | | 1037126 | Ansell Cottage More images | Q26288825 |
| Church Cottages | II | Church Hill | | | 23 May 1979 | TL9657647635; 52°05′32″N 0°52′05″E | | 1284721 | Church Cottages More images | Q26573466 |
| Church of St Peter | I | Church Hill | church building | | 23 January 1958 | TL9662147752; 52°05′35″N 0°52′08″E | | 1351546 | Church of St Peter More images | Q17542468 |
| Cottage Approximately 15 Yards (12 Metres) North of the Swan Inn | II | Church Hill | | | 10 July 1980 | TL9661947617; 52°05′31″N 0°52′07″E | | 1351545 | Cottage Approximately 15 Yards (12 Metres) North of the Swan Inn More images | Q26634635 |
| Cottage Owned by the Ansell Trust Adjoining Ansell Cottage on the North | II | Church Hill | | | 10 July 1980 | TL9656447608; 52°05′31″N 0°52′05″E | | 1351547 | Cottage Owned by the Ansell Trust Adjoining Ansell Cottage on the North More images | Q26634636 |
| Hall Cottage | II | Church Hill | | | 10 July 1980 | TL9659147683; 52°05′33″N 0°52′06″E | | 1037128 | Hall Cottage More images | Q26288827 |
| Hill Cottage | II | Church Hill | | | 10 July 1980 | TL9658847670; 52°05′33″N 0°52′06″E | | 1182079 | Hill Cottage More images | Q26477356 |
| Pump on the Village Green | II | Church Hill | | | 10 July 1980 | TL9659147613; 52°05′31″N 0°52′06″E | | 1182088 | Pump on the Village Green More images | Q26477364 |
| The Cottage | II | Church Hill | | | 10 July 1980 | TL9661147631; 52°05′32″N 0°52′07″E | | 1037125 | The Cottage More images | Q26288824 |
| The Old Rectory | II | Church Hill | | | 10 July 1980 | TL9662747835; 52°05′38″N 0°52′08″E | | 1284719 | Upload Photo | Q26573465 |
| Walnut Tree Cottage and Costa Plenty | II | Church Hill, Ipswich, IP7 7JQ | | | 23 May 1979 | TL9658447651; 52°05′32″N 0°52′06″E | | 1037127 | Walnut Tree Cottage and Costa Plenty More images | Q26288826 |
| Bridge Farmhouse | II | Hadleigh Road | | | 23 January 1958 | TL9718847668; 52°05′32″N 0°52′37″E | | 1037084 | Bridge Farmhouse More images | Q26288781 |
| Foysters Hall | II | Hadleigh Road | | | 23 January 1958 | TL9712847606; 52°05′30″N 0°52′34″E | | 1351568 | Upload Photo | Q26634657 |
| Highlands Hall | II | Highlands Road | | | 23 January 1958 | TL9692348514; 52°06′00″N 0°52′25″E | | 1037085 | Upload Photo | Q26288782 |
| Old Mill the Old Mill House | II | Mill Lane | | | 10 July 1980 | TL9646847496; 52°05′27″N 0°51′59″E | | 1351569 | Old Mill the Old Mill House More images | Q26634658 |
| Hawkins Farmhouse | II | Monks Eleigh Tye | | | 10 July 1980 | TL9553648495; 52°06′01″N 0°51′12″E | | 1037086 | Upload Photo | Q26288783 |
| Tye Cottage (opposite Hawkins Farm) | II | Monks Eleigh Tye | | | 10 July 1980 | TL9550248441; 52°05′59″N 0°51′11″E | | 1037087 | Upload Photo | Q26288784 |
| Newland Hall | II | Stackwood Green | | | 10 July 1980 | TL9651745754; 52°04′31″N 0°51′58″E | | 1037088 | Upload Photo | Q26288785 |
| Slough Farmhouse | II | Stackwood Green | | | 10 July 1980 | TL9644845660; 52°04′28″N 0°51′54″E | | 1351570 | Upload Photo | Q26634659 |
| Stackwood Cottage | II | Stackwood Green | | | 10 July 1980 | TL9655545791; 52°04′32″N 0°52′00″E | | 1351571 | Upload Photo | Q26634660 |
| Cobbolds Mill | II | Stowmarket Road | | | 23 January 1958 | TL9746847744; 52°05′34″N 0°52′52″E | | 1037089 | Upload Photo | Q26288786 |
| Cobbolds Mill House | II | Stowmarket Road | | | 23 January 1958 | TL9746547759; 52°05′35″N 0°52′52″E | | 1037090 | Upload Photo | Q26288787 |
| Barn and Outbuildings Approximately 50 Feet to the West of Fenn Farm | II | IP7 7AB, Swingleton Green | | | 10 July 1980 | TL9616447327; 52°05′22″N 0°51′43″E | | 1037101 | Barn and Outbuildings Approximately 50 Feet to the West of Fenn Farm More images | Q26288799 |
| Fenn Farm | II* | Swingleton Green, Ipswich, IP7 7AB | architectural structure | | 23 January 1958 | TL9619247312; 52°05′22″N 0°51′44″E | | 1182166 | Fenn Farm More images | Q17533714 |
| 1-3, the Alley | II | 1-3, The Alley | | | 10 July 1980 | TL9656047555; 52°05′29″N 0°52′04″E | | 1037121 | 1-3, the Alley More images | Q26288819 |
| Alexanders | II | The Street | | | 23 January 1958 | TL9666847578; 52°05′30″N 0°52′10″E | | 1351573 | Alexanders More images | Q26634662 |
| Alices, Dolphin Barn and Whales Haven | II | The Street | | | 10 July 1980 | TL9654947571; 52°05′30″N 0°52′04″E | | 1182020 | Alices, Dolphin Barn and Whales Haven More images | Q26477298 |
| Branford House | II | The Street | | | 10 July 1980 | TL9701747731; 52°05′34″N 0°52′29″E | | 1037096 | Upload Photo | Q26288794 |
| Brett House | II | The Street | | | 10 July 1980 | TL9699747724; 52°05′34″N 0°52′28″E | | 1037095 | Brett House More images | Q26288793 |
| Bull Inn | II | The Street | | | 10 July 1980 | TL9676747596; 52°05′30″N 0°52′15″E | | 1037099 | Bull Inn More images | Q26288797 |
| Christmas Tree Cottage | II | The Street | | | 10 July 1980 | TL9697147729; 52°05′34″N 0°52′26″E | | 1182129 | Christmas Tree Cottage More images | Q26477403 |
| Foskers | II | The Street | | | 10 July 1980 | TL9688447679; 52°05′33″N 0°52′21″E | | 1284701 | Foskers More images | Q26573448 |
| High Cottage | II | The Street | | | 10 July 1980 | TL9695247737; 52°05′34″N 0°52′25″E | | 1182126 | High Cottage More images | Q26477400 |
| Jane Farthings Cottage | II | The Street | | | 10 July 1980 | TL9686347659; 52°05′32″N 0°52′20″E | | 1037092 | Jane Farthings Cottage More images | Q26288790 |
| K6 Telephone Kiosk | II | The Street | | | 11 May 1989 | TL9665347582; 52°05′30″N 0°52′09″E | | 1037018 | K6 Telephone Kiosk More images | Q26288702 |
| Oak Cottage | II | The Street | | | 10 July 1980 | TL9702547732; 52°05′34″N 0°52′29″E | | 1284670 | Oak Cottage More images | Q26573418 |
| Old Cottage and Cottage Adjoining on the West | II | The Street | | | 23 January 1958 | TL9660447574; 52°05′30″N 0°52′07″E | | 1284678 | Old Cottage and Cottage Adjoining on the West More images | Q26573425 |
| Old Forge | II | The Street | | | 10 July 1980 | TL9696747702; 52°05′33″N 0°52′26″E | | 1284672 | Old Forge More images | Q26573420 |
| Orchard House Vincents Cottage | II | The Street | | | 23 January 1958 | TL9692947713; 52°05′34″N 0°52′24″E | | 1037093 | Orchard House Vincents Cottage More images | Q26288791 |
| Paddock Hall | II | The Street | | | 10 July 1980 | TL9715647722; 52°05′34″N 0°52′36″E | | 1182142 | Paddock Hall More images | Q26477415 |
| Rushbrooks | II | The Street | | | 23 January 1958 | TL9680847607; 52°05′30″N 0°52′17″E | | 1182147 | Rushbrooks More images | Q26477420 |
| Stanesbyes | II | The Street | | | 10 July 1980 | TL9705947706; 52°05′33″N 0°52′31″E | | 1351572 | Stanesbyes More images | Q26634661 |
| Thatchers Rest | II | The Street | | | 10 July 1980 | TL9696747722; 52°05′34″N 0°52′26″E | | 1037094 | Thatchers Rest More images | Q26288792 |
| The Croft | II | The Street | | | 10 July 1980 | TL9709647726; 52°05′34″N 0°52′33″E | | 1037097 | The Croft More images | Q26288795 |
| The Old Guildhall | II | The Street | | | 23 January 1958 | TL9692447678; 52°05′33″N 0°52′24″E | | 1037098 | The Old Guildhall More images | Q26288796 |
| The Post Office and House Adjoining | II | The Street | | | 10 July 1980 | TL9666247600; 52°05′30″N 0°52′10″E | | 1284699 | The Post Office and House Adjoining More images | Q26573446 |
| The Swan Inn | II | The Street | inn | | 23 January 1958 | TL9661847599; 52°05′30″N 0°52′07″E | | 1037091 | The Swan Inn More images | Q26288789 |
| Cottage Adjoining and Now Part of the Swan Inn and Cottage Adjoining on the North | II | Church Hill | | | 23 January 1958 | TL9661547607; 52°05′31″N 0°52′07″E | | 1182028 | Cottage Adjoining and Now Part of the Swan Inn and Cottage Adjoining on the North More images | Q26477306 |
| White House | II | The Street | | | 23 January 1958 | TL9664247576; 52°05′30″N 0°52′09″E | | 1182152 | White House More images | Q26477424 |
| Yeomans Cottage and Cottage Adjoining on the East | II | The Street | | | 23 January 1958 | TL9662647574; 52°05′30″N 0°52′08″E | | 1037100 | Yeomans Cottage and Cottage Adjoining on the East More images | Q26288798 |
| 1 and 2, the Willows and 3, the Willows Cottage | II | 1 and 2, The Willows, The Street, IP7 7AU | | | 10 July 1980 | TL9658347572; 52°05′30″N 0°52′05″E | | 1351574 | 1 and 2, the Willows and 3, the Willows Cottage More images | Q26634663 |

== See also ==
- Grade I listed buildings in Suffolk
- Grade II* listed buildings in Suffolk

== Sources ==
- Bettely, James; Pevsner, Nikolaus (2015) [1961], Suffolk: West, The Buildings of England, New Haven and London: Yale University Press, ISBN 978-0-300-19655-9
