= Hitcham =

Hitcham is the name of more than one place in the United Kingdom:

- Hitcham, Buckinghamshire
- Hitcham, Suffolk, near Ipswich
