= Listed buildings in Brent Eleigh =

Civil Parish in Suffolk, England

Brent Eleigh is a village and civil parish in the Babergh District of Suffolk, England. It contains 19 listed buildings that are recorded in the National Heritage List for England. Of these two are grade I, two are grade II* and 15 are grade II.

This list is based on the information retrieved online from Historic England.

== Key ==
Grade	Criteria
I	Buildings that are of exceptional interest
II*	Particularly important buildings of more than special interest
II	Buildings that are of special interest

== Listing ==
Name	Grade	Location	Type	Completed (Note: The date given is the date used by Historic England as significant for the initial building or that of an important part in the structure's description.)	Date designated	Grid ref. (Note: The grid reference is based on the British national grid reference system, sometimes known as OSGB36, used by the Ordnance Survey.) Geo-coordinates	Notes	Entry number (Note: The "List Entry Number" is a unique number assigned to each listed building and scheduled monument by Historic England.)	Image	Wikidata
Collier's Farmhouse	II				10 July 1980	TL9449349444; 52°06′33″N 0°50′20″E		1037382	Upload Photo	Q26289101
Hill Farmhouse	II				23 January 1958	TL9334347842; 52°05′42″N 0°49′16″E		1037383	Upload Photo	Q26289102
Two Barns to the West of Hill Farmhouse	II				10 July 1980	TL9328147840; 52°05′42″N 0°49′13″E		1193883	Upload Photo	Q26488524
Barn at Abbot's Hall	II	Cock Lane			10 July 1980	TL9261947346; 52°05′27″N 0°48′37″E		1193893	Upload Photo	Q26488534
Vaiseys Farmhouse	II	Cock Lane			10 July 1980	TL9333647038; 52°05′16″N 0°49′14″E		1351431	Upload Photo	Q26634539
Brent Eleigh Hall	I	Hall Road	architectural structure		23 January 1958	TL9412248225; 52°05′54″N 0°49′58″E		1285950	Brent Eleigh Hall More images	Q17542374
Bridge Across the River to the North East of Corner Farm	II	Hall Road			10 July 1980	TL9427147939; 52°05′44″N 0°50′05″E		1037384	Upload Photo	Q26289103
Bridge Cottage	II	Hall Road			10 July 1980	TL9431747988; 52°05′46″N 0°50′07″E		1193920	Upload Photo	Q26488559
Church of St Mary the Virgin	I	Hall Road	church building		23 January 1958	TL9420848244; 52°05′54″N 0°50′02″E		1351432	Church of St Mary the Virgin More images	Q17542409
Corrie	II	Lavenham Road			10 July 1980	TL9376148059; 52°05′49″N 0°49′38″E		1351433	Upload Photo	Q26634540
The Cock Public House	II	Lavenham Road	pub		10 July 1980	TL9410147838; 52°05′41″N 0°49′56″E		1037385	The Cock Public House More images	Q26289104
Wall and Gateway South West of Wells Hall	II*	Milden Road	wall		23 January 1958	TL9457147304; 52°05′24″N 0°50′19″E		1037386	Wall and Gateway South West of Wells Hall More images	Q17533480
Colman's Cottages	II	1-6, The Street			23 January 1958	TL9428147799; 52°05′40″N 0°50′05″E		1351454	Upload Photo	Q26634561
Chim Chimineys	II*	The Street, Sudbury, CO10 9NS	farmhouse		23 January 1958	TL9424147879; 52°05′43″N 0°50′03″E		1285914	Chim Chimineys More images	Q17534221
Highbank	II	The Street			23 January 1958	TL9430247779; 52°05′39″N 0°50′06″E		1037344	Upload Photo	Q26289060
Street Farmhouse	II	The Street			10 July 1980	TL9443247626; 52°05′34″N 0°50′13″E		1037346	Upload Photo	Q26289062
Swan Cottage	II	The Street			23 January 1958	TL9434247740; 52°05′38″N 0°50′08″E		1037345	Upload Photo	Q26289061
The Old Cottage	II	The Street			23 January 1958	TL9425647834; 52°05′41″N 0°50′04″E		1037387	Upload Photo	Q26289106
Tudor Cottage	II	The Street			23 January 1958	TL9433347750; 52°05′38″N 0°50′08″E		1351455	Upload Photo	Q26634562

== See also ==
- Grade I listed buildings in Suffolk
- Grade II* listed buildings in Suffolk

== Sources ==
- Bettely, James; Pevsner, Nikolaus (2015) [1961], Suffolk: West, The Buildings of England, New Haven and London: Yale University Press, ISBN 978-0-300-19655-9
