= Ravenstone Priory =

Monastery in Buckinghamshire, England

Coordinates: 52.1487°N 0.7589°W

Ravenstone Priory was a medieval monastic house in Buckinghamshire, England. It was established c.1255 and was dissolved in 1524.

== History ==
Ravenstone Priory was founded around 1255 on land owned by Peter Chaceporc, archdeacon of Wells and Keeper of the Royal Wardrobe. It was established as a house for canons following the Rule of St Augustine and dedicated to St Mary. There are no known records regarding the number of canons at the priory at its foundation, and very little is known about its history or architecture. The canons received 20 shillings each as annual income.

The priory was dissolved on 17 February 1524, likely due to a decrease in the number of canons, as only two remained at the time. It was dissolved by Thomas Wolsey, who used the funds to establish a college at Oxford University (now Christ Church College). The priory later came under the ownership of Francis Bryan and, subsequently, Robert Throgmorton.

A farmhouse was later built on the site of the priory, known as the Abbey. The remains of the priory, moats and fishponds have been listed as a Scheduled Ancient Monument by English Heritage.
