= Arthur Salmon =

Edwin Arthur Salmon (b Clifton 20 November 1832 – d Brent Knoll 20 September 1899) was a British Church of England priest, most notably Archdeacon of Wells from March 1898 until his death.

Salmon was educated at Wadham College, Oxford, matriculating in 1851 and graduating B.A. in 1855. He was ordained as deacon in 1855, and priest in 1856. After a curacy at Christian Malford he was Vicar of Martock until 1888 when he became Rector of Weston-Super-Mare, a post he held until his death.

Church of England titles
Preceded by Otway Fitzgerald	Archdeacon of Wells; 1898–1899	Succeeded by Frederick Brymer
