= Admiral Fitzgerald =

Admiral Fitzgerald may refer to:

- Charles FitzGerald, 1st Baron Lecale (1756–1810), British Royal Navy rear admiral
- Mark P. Fitzgerald (born 1951), U.S. Navy admiral
- Robert Lewis Fitzgerald (1776–1844), British Royal Navy vice admiral
- Fitzgerald (Star Trek), fictional Starfleet admiral in Star Trek
