= Norman McDermid =

English Anglican priest

Norman George Lloyd Roberts McDermid (5 March 1927 – 30 September 2014) was an English Anglican priest.

== Early life ==
The son of Lloyd Roberts and Annie McDermid, he was educated at St Peter's School, York, St Edmund Hall, Oxford and Wells Theological College.

== Religious life ==
McDermid was ordained deacon in 1951, and priest in 1952. After curacies in Leeds he held incumbencies in Bramley, Kirkby Overblow and Knaresborough. He was Archdeacon of Richmond from 1983 to 1993.

Church of England titles
Preceded by John Paul Burbridge	Archdeacon of Richmond; 1983 - 1993	Succeeded by Kenneth Roy Good
