= John Lance =

John Lance may refer to:

- John Lance (priest)
- John Lance (basketball)
