= John Langworth =

English Anglican priest

John Langworth, D.D. was an English Anglican priest in the 16th century.

Langworth was born in Worcestershire and educated at St John's College, Oxford. He held livings in Colchester, Barkway and Wheldrake. Langridge was Archdeacon of Chichester from 1581 to 1586; and Archdeacon of Wells from 1589 until his death in 1613.
