= Action of 30 May 1798 =

1798 battle of the French Revolutionary Wars

- Part of the French Revolutionary Wars
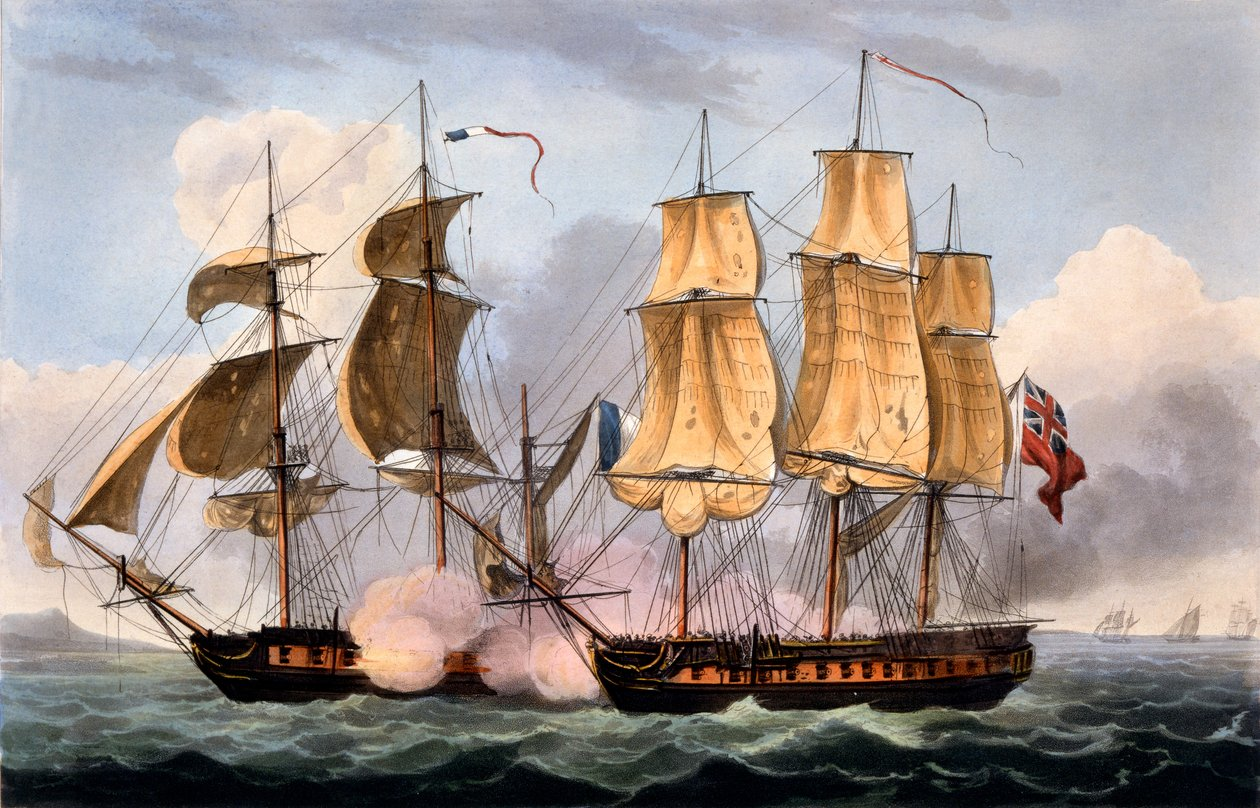
- Capture of La Confiante, May 31st 1798; Thomas Whitcombe, 1816
Date	30–31 May 1798
Location	Off the Dives, English Channel 49°19′10″N 0°6′50″W
Result	British victory

Belligerents
Great Britain	France

Commanders and leaders
Sir Francis Laforey	Etienne Pévrieu

Strength
1 frigate 1 bomb vessel 1 cutter	2 corvettes 1 cutter

Casualties and losses
None	1 corvette destroyed

The action of 30 May 1798 was a minor naval engagement between a small British squadron and a small French squadron off the coast of Normandy, France during the French Revolutionary Wars. A British blockading force, which had been conducting patrols in the region in the aftermath of the battle of St Marcou earlier in the month, encountered two French vessels attempting to sail unnoticed between Le Havre and Cherbourg-en-Cotentin. Closing with the French, the British commander Sir Francis Laforey sought to bring the French ships to battle as they attempted to turn back to Le Havre before the British squadron could attack. The French were unable to escape, and Laforey's ship, the fifth rate HMS Hydra, engaged the French corvette Confiante, while two smaller British ships chased the Vésuve.

After a brief exchange of fire, their crews ran both French ships onshore close to the mouth of the river Dives, where several of the landing barges that had survived the attack on the British-held Îles Saint-Marcouf were sheltering. Confiante was badly damaged and boarding parties from Hydra and the other ships were able to board and burn her the following morning. Vésuve had suffered less than the Confiante and troops onshore were able to protect her from further attack until her crew could bring her into the nearby harbour of Sallenelles. There she was repaired and eventually she returned to Le Havre.

== Background ==
By 1798 the British Royal Navy had successfully contained the French Navy within its own harbours, employing a strategy of close blockade to ensure dominance at sea during the French Revolutionary Wars. The strategy was particularly effective in the English Channel, where the proximity of British bases and the importance in limiting the movements of the French invasion forces stationed around Boulogne focused British attention on the Normandy coast. This was essential to prevent the concentration of a large force of invasion barges that had been constructed at various harbours under the guidance of Captain J. J. Muskein. To improve the Royal Navy's ability to observe French movements on the Normandy coast, a force under the command of Captain Sir Sidney Smith seized, garrisoned, and fortified the uninhabited Îles Saint-Marcouf in 1795.

During the spring of 1798, Muskein concentrated over 50 of the landing barges in Saint-Vaast-la-Hougue and on 7 May launched an attack on the Îles Saint-Marcouf while a combination of wind and tide prevented the blockade squadron from intervening. The fortified islands were too well-defended however and over 900 French soldiers died in the ensuing battle before the French abandoned the attack. The French subsequently dispersed the remaining landing barges to various ports on the Normandy coast. In response the Royal Navy increased its patrols in the region with the intention of intercepting the convoys and destroying the barges. French movements along the coast were not solely confined to landing barges: on 29 May 1798 two warships, the 20 or 24-gun Confiante under captain de vaisseau Etienne Pévrieu, and the 20-gun Vésuve under lieutenant de vaisseau Jean-Baptiste-Louis Lecolier, sailed from Le Havre, travelling westwards across the Baie de la Seine to Cherbourg-en-Cotentin, accompanied by a small, armed cutter. (Note: James bases his discussion on the letter published in the London Gazette, which describes Confiante as a 36-gun frigate of 300 men. She was a corvette of twenty to twenty-four 12 and 6-pounder guns when she was lost, though French records too refer to her as a frigate. The normal complement for vessels of the Serpente class, to which Confiante belonged, was 188. The British reports were more accurate in their description of Vésuve.)

== Battle of 30 May ==
=== Engagement at sea ===
On the morning of 30 May, a British squadron sailing off La Havre spotted the French ships pulling to the west and gave chase, Captain Laforey leading in the 38-gun HMS Hydra, followed by the bomb vessel HMS Vesuvius, under Captain Robert Lewis Fitzgerald, and the 12-gun cutter HMS Trial, under Lieutenant Henry Garrett. Discovering the British in pursuit, Pevrieux ordered his squadron to retreat towards the shore, tacking in front of Hydra and opening an ineffective fire at long range. Laforey continued his approach, and a 06:00 successfully tacked Hydra into a position between Confiante and Vésuve, which had turned back towards the shore. Although the British frigate came under fire from both French ships, their attacks had little impact. Laforey was able to concentrate his broadside against Vésuve and rapidly forced the French corvette to turn inshore, pursued by Vesuvius and Trial. Laforey then set off in pursuit of Confiante, which was attempting to turn back towards Le Havre. The French cutter was unable to escape the British pursuit and its crew deliberately drove it ashore near the mouth of the river Dives.

At 06:30, Hydra caught up with Pevrieux on the Confiante and began a heavy fire, which the French warship returned when possible. The exchange continued for 45 minutes until 07:15, when Confiante, having suffered serious damage, drove aground on a sandbank near Beuzeval, a village a short distance to the west of the mouth of the Dives. As Confiante struck the sandbank, her mainmast collapsed, rending further manoeuvre under hostile fire impossible. Vésuve too drove ashore to avoid the British attack, Lieutenant Lecolier managing to beach his ship within the Dives estuary itself. As the rising tide brought the corvette off the beach, Lecolier made a brief attempt to escape westwards towards Caen, but Trial and Vesuvius were alert and drove Vésuve back to the shore. There the two small British vessels opened up a distant fire on the corvette, as did Hydra to the west against Confiante. At 09:30, the falling tide forced the British ships to retreat off-shore, Laforey gathering his vessels approximately 5 miles (8.0 km) northeast of the beached French convoy.

=== Attack by boats ===
During the day, the French strengthened the positions of both battered ships, soldiers from the surrounding area gathering on the beaches to deter any boat attacks on the grounded vessels. Among the soldiers were men taken from several of Muskein's landing barges that were sheltering in the Dives River. These troops were identified by Trial, which briefly closed with Confiante to determine her condition and was fired on by the remaining guns in operation on the frigate. With their evacuation covered from the shore, most of the crew were removed from Confiante, including all the wounded. The French eventually abandoned the wrecked corvette in the evening. Vésuve was in better condition and remained well protected. Her crew shored up their vessel at low tide to prevent her falling over and prepared to heave the ship off as the tide rose. Due to the strong French military presence, Laforey decided to delay any operation against the beached vessels until circumstances were more favourable.

At 10:00 on the morning of 31 May, Laforey sent the boats from his squadron inshore to attack the grounded Confiante. Coming alongside the wreck at 12:45, the British boarding party, under Lieutenants George Acklom and William J. Simonds, found no one alive on the ship, but counted a large number of French dead still on board. Removing the French colours and paperwork, the boarding party started fires in the bow and stern of the corvette before withdrawing, despite a steady but ineffective musket fire from French troops overlooking the beach and a force of cavalry moving along the shore. The fire rapidly destroyed Confiante and the British boarding party retired without casualties.

As the British attack proceeded against Confiante, the crew of Vésuve succeeded in refloating her and soon had their ship anchored under the protection of gun batteries at Sallenelles. These defences were augmented by additional batteries set up by 200 soldiers under Captain Muskein, drawn from the barges that had been trapped in the town by the British blockade. By the time Confiante had been destroyed, the mouth of the Dives had been heavily fortified and even the arrival of the 38-gun frigate HMS Diamond under Captain Sir Richard Strachan on 1 June was insufficient to counterbalance French numerical superiority. Eventually Laforey was forced to retire from the blockade of Sallenelles, and while he was absent Vésuve managed to get underway and reach Le Havre without further incident.

== Aftermath ==
French casualties in the engagement are uncertain due to the circumstances of Confiante's destruction, but based on Acklom's report from the boarding party they were believed to be heavy. British losses were negligible, with not one man killed or seriously wounded and only minor damage inflicted on Hydra and none on the smaller vessels. The conduct of Lieutenant Lecolier was the subject of much criticism in France after the battle; in the French history Victories et Conquêtes, Lecolier was accused of failing to support Pevrieux and grounding his ship while the outcome of the battle was still undecided. British historian William James is less critical of Lecolier, focusing much of the blame for the French defeat on the more senior Pevrieux. The restriction of French movement along their own coastline had serious effects for the development of the French forces in the region and played a significant role in the failure of the French to pose a realistic invasion threat to Britain.

== Notes, citations and references ==
=== References ===
- Clowes, William Laird (1997) [1900]. The Royal Navy, A History from the Earliest Times to 1900, Volume IV. Chatham Publishing. ISBN 1-86176-013-2.
- "Fonds Marine. Campagnes (opérations; divisions et stations navales; missions diverses). Inventaire de la sous-série Marine BB4. Tome premier : BB4 1 à 482 (1790-1826)" (PDF). Service historique du Ministère de la Défense. Archived from the original (PDF) on 20 April 2021.
- Gardiner, Robert, ed. (2001) [1996]. Nelson Against Napoleon. Caxton Editions. ISBN 1-86176-026-4.
- James, William (2002) [1827]. The Naval History of Great Britain, Volume 2, 1797–1799. Conway Maritime Press. ISBN 0-85177-906-9.
- Woodman, Richard (2001). The Sea Warriors. Constable Publishers. ISBN 1-84119-183-3.
- Winfield, Rif; Roberts, Stephen S. (2015). French Warships in the Age of Sail 1786–1861: Design Construction, Careers and Fates. Seaforth Publishing. ISBN 978-1-84832-204-2.
