= Milden Castle =

Castle in Milden, Suffolk, England

Coordinates: 52°4′43.0968″N 0°50′44.0916″E

Milden Castle was a motte-and-bailey castle on Foxburrow hill in Milden, a village in Suffolk, England.

It had been built by the twelfth century, and seems to have been involved in hostilities during the Anarchy. The chronicle of Jocelin of Brakelond records that, during the Anarchy, the abbott at Bury St Edmunds had granted Adam De Cockfield the village of Groton as he was able to defend it against the castellan in Milden on account of holding a castle in nearby Lindsey.

All that remains today is the twelve foot tall motte, with damage to the site and the destruction of the bailey a result of later gravel extraction. The mound is a scheduled monument.
