= Armstrong Hall =

Armstrong Hall (1853–1921) was Archdeacon of Richmond from 1908 until his death.

Armstrong was born at Parkhurst, Isle of Wight and educated at Christ's Hospital and King's College London. After a curacy at Lee in South-east London he held incumbencies in the Isle of Man, Bristol, Swindon, Isleworth, Perth, NB and Methley.

During World War I he was a Chaplain to the Forces and Deputy Assistant Chaplain General (Northern Command). Later he was an Honorary Chaplain to the King.

Church of England titles
Preceded by William Danks	Archdeacon of Richmond; 1908 - 1921	Succeeded by Arthur Watson
