= Charles Bridgeman (priest) =

English priest (died 1678)

Charles Bridgeman was an English priest in the 17th century.

The nephew of Sir Orlando Bridgeman, 1st Baronet, of Great Lever, he was educated at The Queen's College, Oxford. He held livings at Ibstock and Llanrhaiadr; and was Archdeacon of Richmond from 1664 until his death on 26 November 1678.
