= Ted Thomas (priest) =

Church of England priest (1927–2023)

Charles Edward Thomas (30 December 1927 – 14 January 2023) was a Church of England priest, most notably Archdeacon of Wells from 1983 to 1993.

Thomas was educated at St David's College, Lampeter and the College of the Resurrection, Mirfield. He was ordained deacon in 1953, and priest in 1954. After a curacy in Ilminster he was Chaplain of St Michael's College, Tenbury. After another curacy in St Albans he was Vicar of St Michael and All Angels, Boreham Wood from 1958 to 1966. He was Rector of Monksilver from 1966 to 1974; then Vicar of South Petherton from 1974 until 1983.

Thomas died on 14 January 2023, at the age of 95.

Church of England titles
Preceded by Peter Haynes	Archdeacon of Wells; 1983–1993	Succeeded by Richard Acworth
