= Frederick Brymer =

Frederick Augustus Brymer (15 October 1850 – 1 May 1917) was a British Church of England priest, most notably Archdeacon of Wells from 1899 until his death.

Brymer was educated at Radley and Christ Church, Oxford. He was ordained as deacon in 1874, and as priest in 1876. After a curacy in Wargrave he became Rector of Charlton Mackrell in 1876. He became Prebendary of Wiveliscombe in 1891; Secretary of the Bath and Wells Diocesan School Association in 1897; Proctor in convocation for Bath and Wells in 1898; and Prebendary of Huish and Brent in 1899.

Church of England titles
Preceded by Arthur Salmon	Archdeacon of Wells; 1899–1917	Succeeded by Walter Farrer
