= Richard Acworth =

British priest

Richard Foote Acworth (born 19 October 1936) is a British Church of England priest, most notably Archdeacon of Wells from 1993 to 2003.

Acworth was educated at St John's School, Leatherhead; Sidney Sussex College, Cambridge and Cuddesdon. After National Service in the RNVR he was ordained deacon in 1963, and priest in 1964. He served curacies in Fulham, Langley and Bridgwater. He was Vicar of Yatton from 1969 to 1981; Priest in charge of St Mary Magdalene and St John Taunton from 1981 to 1985; and Vicar of St Mary Magdalene, Taunton from 1985 to 1993.

== Publications ==
- Creation, Evolution and the Christian Faith (1969) ISBN 9780852340165

Church of England titles
| Preceded by Ted Thomas | Archdeacon of Wells; 1993–2003 | Succeeded by Peter Maurice |
