= Milden, Suffolk =

Village in Suffolk, England

Coordinates: 52.082°N 0.855°E

Milden
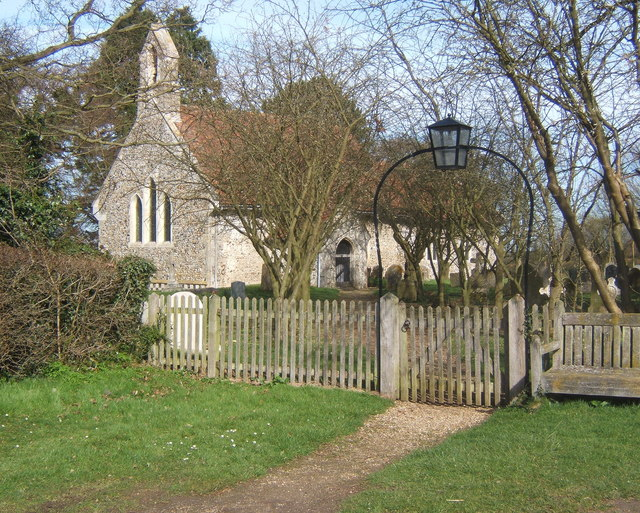
- St Peter's Church

- Location within Suffolk
- Area: 5.436 km^{2} (2.099 sq mi)
- Population: 118 (2021)
  - Density: 22/km^{2} (57/sq mi)
- Civil parish: Milden
- District: Babergh
- Shire county: Suffolk
- Region: East
- Country: England
- Sovereign state: United Kingdom
- Post town: Ipswich
- Postcode district: IP7
- Dialling code: 01449
- UK Parliament: South Suffolk

Milden is a village and civil parish in the Babergh district, in Suffolk, England. Located around 4 1/2 miles from Sudbury. In 2021 the parish had a population of 118. The parish borders Brent Eleigh, Edwardstone, Groton, Lindsey, Little Waldingfield and Monks Eleigh. There are 18 listed buildings in Milden. St Peter's Church is a Grade I listed building.

The parish contains the Milden Thicks SSSI and the remains of Milden Castle.

== History ==
The name "Milden" means 'Melda's people' or 'orach place'. Milden was recorded in the Domesday Book as Mellinga. The Domesday book records that, in 1086, the village had eighteen households, one (water) mill, and one church. The abbey of St Edmund held one household, whilst the Essex and Suffolk landowner Walter the Deacon held the other seventeen, along with the church, mill, and most of the village's resources.

During the twelfth century, 'some men of the monks of Canterbury were wounded even to death' in the village, although the monks refused to bring the matter to court due to an ongoing dispute over the rights of the courts of St Edmund's Abbey and those of the Archbishop of Canterbury to hear cases in the region. The dispute was begun by another murder in the neighbouring village of Monks Eleigh, where the murderers had been captured by Robert de Cockfield and taken to the courts of St Edmund rather than Canterbury - who held Monks Eleigh.

Milden was in the Babergh hundred, in 1894 it became part of Cosford Rural District which became part of the administrative county of West Suffolk in 1889. In 1974 it became part of Babergh non-metropolitan district in the non-metropolitan county of Suffolk.

== Notable residents ==
- William Burkitt, local vicar
- Simonds d'Ewes, politician
- Herbert Dowbiggin (1880-1966), policeman and eighth British colonial Inspector General of Police of Ceylon from 1913 to 1937.
