= Henry Dove =

English priest

Henry Dove D.D. was an English priest in the 17th century.

The nephew of Bishop John Pearson, Dove was educated at Westminster School and Trinity College, Cambridge. He was incorporated at Oxford in 1669. He became the incumbent at St Bride's Church in the City of London in 1673; and Archdeacon of Richmond in 1678. He was Chaplain to Charles II, James II and William and Mary.

Dove died on 11 March 1694.
