= John Owen (archdeacon of Richmond) =

English cleric

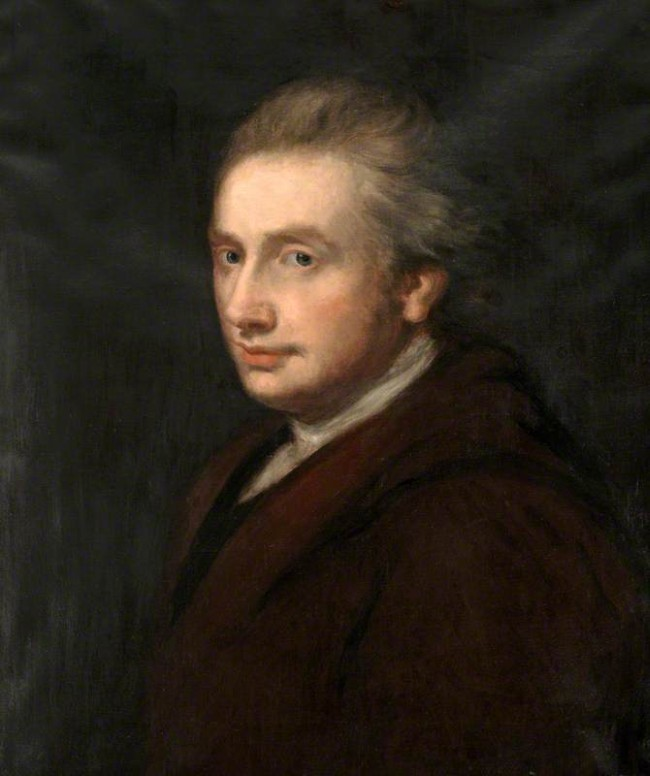
Archdeacon John Owen by John Opie. Painted about 1782.

John Owen (1754–1824) was an English cleric, who served as Archdeacon of Richmond, and Chaplain General to the British Armed Forces during the later part of the Napoleonic Wars.

== Life ==
John Owen was born into a religious family who knew John Wesley, one of the founders of the Methodists. His mother Hannah Frances Owen is mentioned in Wesley's journals in conjunction with a boarding school for girls she ran in Publow, Somerset; and his father John Owen was a wealthy shipping agent from Portsmouth. Owen first aspired to be a painter, and was apprenticed to the Cornish artist John Opie (1761–1807). However, he felt called to the clergy instead, and matriculated on 6 December 1771 at Worcester College, Oxford, where he earned a Bachelor of Arts in 1775 and a fellowship to New College. He next became curate of Walthamstow and later St. John's, Clerkenwell, before embarking in 1783 for India as a missionary with the British East India Company. He and Opie remained close, and some of their letters from Owen's missionary days survive.

Beginning his duties on 1 April 1783 as chaplain of the Fort William garrison in Calcutta, Owen was subsequently appointed in 1788 as the Junior Chaplain to the Presidency (of the East India Company), upon the promotion of Rev. Thomas Blanshard, the previous junior chaplain, to senior chaplain. He is said as chaplain to have wielded an "immense influence for good", among his accomplishments being the building and subsequent promotion in Lahore, Punjab of a native hospital that survives today as the Mayo Hospital. He spent close to twelve years abroad, before returning to England in 1794 with a personal fortune of some £25,000, acquired in trading ventures that the Bengal chaplaincy used to supplement their meager allowances from the East India Company.

Back in England, Owen studied theology at Hertford College, Oxford, earning in 1797 a second Bachelor of Arts degree, and then in 1801 a Master of Arts at Christ's College, Cambridge, after which he became Archdeacon of Richmond, and then in 1802 Rector of St Benet Paul's Wharf in London. He also served in 1799 as an army brigade chaplain under General Sir Ralph Abercromby on the Anglo-Russian invasion of Holland (Batavian Republic), and then in 1809 he was Senior Chaplain to the Forces in Spain and Portugal under Sir Arthur Wellesley, 1st Duke of Wellington on the Peninsular campaign of the Napoleonic Wars. When John Gamble, the first Chaplain General to the Army, retired in 1810 due to poor health, John Owen was appointed on the recommendation of Prime Minister Spencer Perceval to take Gamble's place. He was then appointed in 1812 as Chaplain General to the Navy as well, which made him the first Chaplain General to the British Armed Forces. Notably, Owen served again with Wellington, but this time in Belgium, where he led British troops in prayer on the eve of the 1815 Battle of Waterloo. He also donated over £5,000 of his own money so that the Book of Common Prayer could be distributed to British soldiers.

Owen continued as Chaplain General when on 1 June 1820 he was appointed Rector of St. Martin's Church in East Horsley, Surrey. He died on 4 June 1824 in East Horsley, and is buried at St. Martins in a family vault. He left more than £100,000 of his fortune to just his family, in addition to two or three equally large legacies to bible and missionary societies, including the British and Foreign Bible Society. He was succeeded as Archdeacon of Richmond by Henry Law, and as Chaplain General by Robert Hodgson. There is a portrait of John Owen by John Opie in the Museum of Army Chaplaincy in Amport House, Andover, Hampshire that was painted when Owen was 28 years old, just before he went to India.
