= Norman Higgins =

British Church of England priest

Walter Norman Higgins (27 April 1880 – 17 May 1957) was a British Church of England priest, most notably Archdeacon of Wells from 1940 to 1951.

Higgins was educated at King's School, Bruton; Emmanuel College, Cambridge; and Wells Theological College. He was ordained deacon in 1905; and priest in 1906. His first post was as curate at St Andrew Battersea., and his second at St Paul, Herne Hill. He was Domestic Chaplain to the Bishop of Adelaide from 1908 to 1916 when he joined the AIF. He was Vicar of All Saints, Portsea from 1917 to 1926; and Rector of Great Bookham from then until his appointment as Archdeacon.

Church of England titles
Preceded by George Hollis	Archdeacon of Wells; 1940–1951	Succeeded by Bryant Salmon
