= William Danks =

Anglican cleric

William Danks (b Nottingham, 3 September 1845- d Canterbury 4 September 1916) was Archdeacon of Richmond from 1894 until 1907.

Danks was educated at The Queen's College, Oxford. After a curacy at Basford he held incumbencies at Ilkley, Richmond, Yorkshire. He also wrote several books.

Church of England titles
Preceded by Edwards Cust	Archdeacon of Richmond; 1894 - 1907	Succeeded by Armstrong Hall
