= William Stratford =

English priest

William Stratford (29 June 1672 – 7 May 1729) was an English priest.

Stratford was born in Manchester. Stratford was educated at Christ Church, Oxford. He became Chaplain of the House of Commons and Archdeacon of Richmond in 1703. He was Chaplain to Charles II, James II and William and Mary. He died in Oxford.
