= Arthur Watson (priest) =

Arthur Herbert Watson (b Bootle, Cumberland 15 May 1864; d Keswick, Cumberland 13 July 1952) was Archdeacon of Richmond from 1921 until 1937.

Watson was educated at Marlborough College and The Queen's College, Oxford. Watson was ordained in 1890. After a curacy at Beeston Hill he was a Chaplain to the Forces in Natal then Vicar of St Peter, Maritzburg. He held further incumbencies at Ovingham, Long Preston and Kirkby Wiske. He was a Canon Residentiary of Ripon Cathedral from 1922 until 1937.

Church of England titles
Preceded by Armstrong Hall	Archdeacon of Richmond; 1921–1937	Succeeded by Claude Thornton
