= Edwin Sandys (priest) =

Md Abdullah Al-Roman

Edwin Sandys (25 October 1642 – 8 October 1705) was an English Anglican priest in the late 17th and early 18th centuries.

Sandys was educated at Magdalen College, Oxford. He was a Fellow at Magdalen from 1665 to 1672. He held the living at Yeovilton with Puddimore. Sandys was Archdeacon of Wells from 1684 until his death on 8 October 1705.
