= Samuel Hill (priest) =

The Venerable Samuel Hill was an Anglican priest in England.

Hill was born in South Petherton, Somerset, and educated at St Mary Hall, Oxford. He held livings at Middlezoy, Kilmington and Bruton. He was Canon of Lichfield Cathedral in 1633, and Precentor in 1636. Hill was Archdeacon of Wells from 1707 until his death on 7 March 1716.
