= River Brett =

River in Suffolk, England

Brett
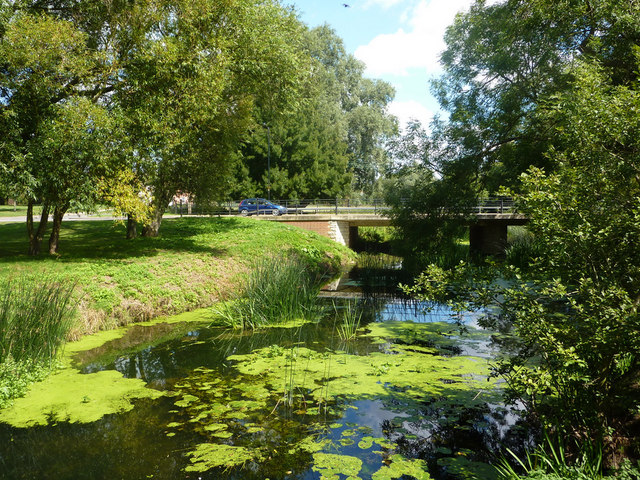
- River Brett at Hadleigh

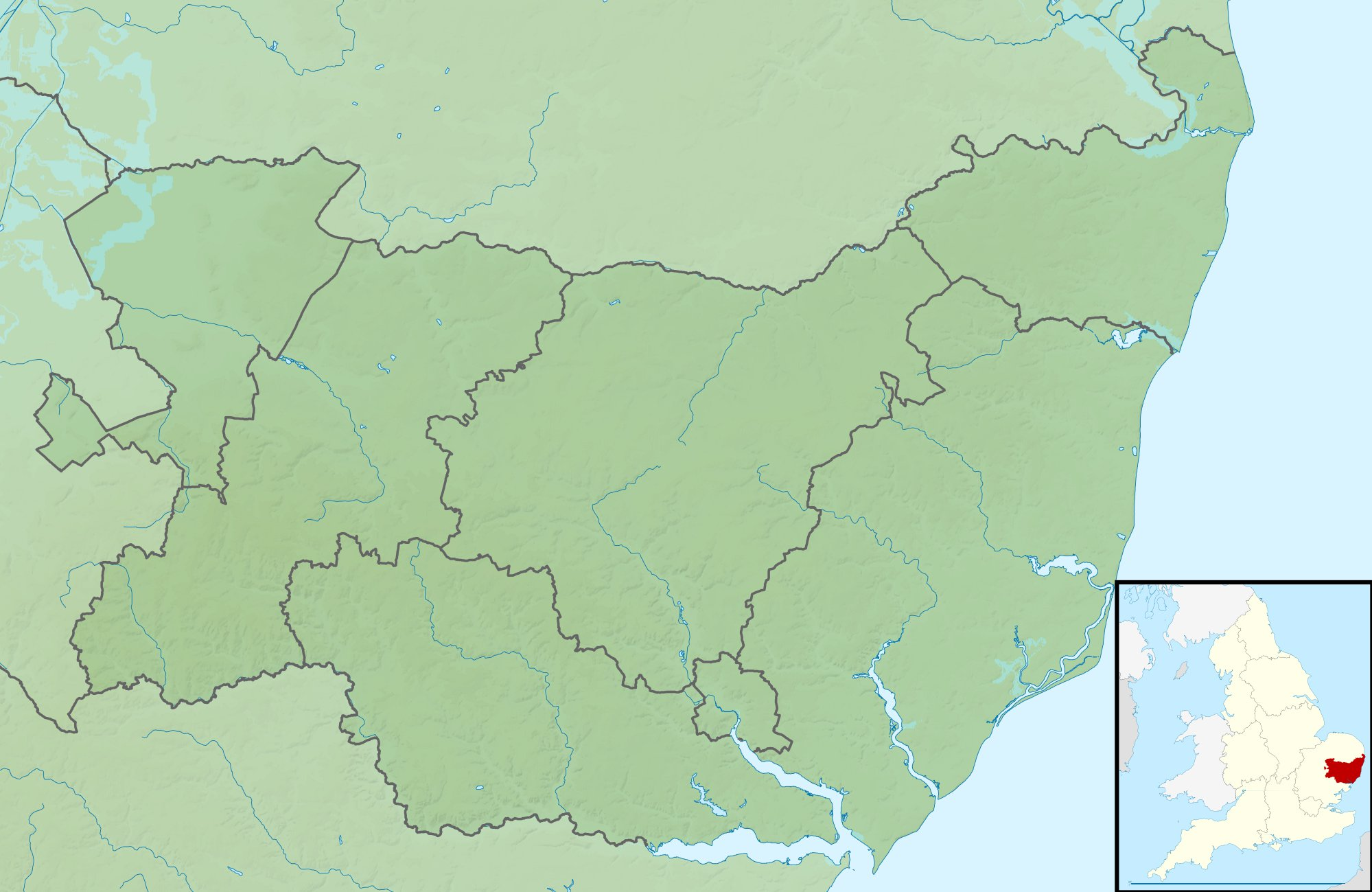
- Location within Suffolk

Location
- Country: England
- Region: Suffolk

Physical characteristics
- Source: Lawshall
  - coordinates: 52.1551°N 0.7361°E
  - elevation: 96 m (315 ft)
- Mouth: Higham
  - coordinates: 51.9769°N 0.9618°E
  - elevation: 7 m (23 ft)
- Length: 41.5 km (25.8 mi)

Basin features
- River system: River Stour

The River Brett is a river in Suffolk, England. Its source is in the villages to the north of Lavenham and it flows through Hadleigh to its confluence with the River Stour via Monks Eleigh, Brent Eleigh and Chelsworth.
