= Peter Chaceporc =

Archdeacon of Wells

Peter Chaceporc (Note: Or Chaseporc or Chaseport or Chasepore or Chaceport or Chacepore) (died 1254) was Keeper of the Wardrobe under Henry III of England, and an Archdeacon of Wells.

== Life ==
Peter was from Poitou, the area of France from which Henry III's half-siblings and a number of his administrators came, and was nephew to Hugh de Vivonne. His brother Hugh was married to Guidona, who may have been one of the Lusignan family. Peter was in the service of Henry III by the beginning of 1240, and he was an ambassador for Henry to Poitou, France, Aragon, and Lyons. By 1241 he was a clerk at the royal wardrobe, becoming keeper, or treasurer, of the wardrobe in October 1241. Henry seems to have relied on the wardrobe for ready money, and Chaceporc was therefore of some significance, not least during the Gascon campaigns of 1242–3 and 1253–4. He deputised for William of Kilkenny as temporary keeper of the great seal in 1253. (Matthew Paris names him as treasurer of the queen, as well.)

He held several ecclesiastical offices: prebendary of Mapesbury, dean of Tattenhall, archdeacon of Wells, treasurer of Lincoln, dean of Tottenham and custodian of the bishoprics of Durham and Winchester during their vacancies. He was with Henry III in December 1254, visiting the church of S. Marie, Boulogne, when he took ill and died. Peter was buried there, but left 600 marks to found, in England, a house of canons regular, with canons from Merton Priory. This was Ravenstone Priory, Buckinghamshire.
