= French corvette Vésuve (1795) =

18-gun corvette of the French Navy

History

France
- Name: Vésuve
- Namesake: Mount Vesuvius
- Builder: Denise, Honfleur
- Laid down: June 1794
- Launched: 7 August 1795
- Decommissioned: 31 July 1815
- In service: October 1795
- Fate: Broken up at Rochefort in 1830

General characteristics
- Type: Corvette
- Displacement: 642-719 tons (French)
- Tons burthen: 352 or 420 (French; "of load")
- Length: 35.95 m (117.9 ft) (overall); 32.48 m (106.6 ft) (keel)
- Beam: 9.74 m (32.0 ft)
- Depth of hold: 4.82 m (15.8 ft)
- Propulsion: Sail
- Armament: Originally: 16 × 18-pounder long guns; 1802: 20 × 12-pounder guns
- Armour: Timber

Vésuve was an 18-gun Etna-class corvette of the French Navy, launched in 1795. She was decommissioned in 1815 and broken up in 1830.

== Career ==
At the action of 30 May 1798 Vésuve and the French corvette Confiante battled the frigate HMS Hydra, the bomb vessel HMS Vesuvius, and the cutter HMS Trial. Confiante and Vésuve ran aground. The British were able to destroy Confiante but they were unable to reach Vésuve, which the French later refloated.

Vésuve served at Le Havre under lieutenant de vaisseau Rousseau between 15 nivôse and 23 prairial An XI (5 January to 12 June 1801). Between November 1801 and February 1802 she was at Le Havre being fitted as a flûte of 20 guns.

In February 1807 she was refitted as a 20-gun corvette.

By 1 February 1812, she served at Cherbourg under lieutenant de vaisseau Le Chosel. On 17 March, she crossed from Le Havre to Cherbourg. From 1 September to 6 October 1813, she served under lieutenant de vaisseau Valette in Cherbourg.

In 1814, after the Bourbon Restoration, Vésuve was sent with the 74-gun Lys and the frigate Érigone to retake possession of Martinique. Vésuve was commanded by lieutenant de vaisseau Burgues de Missiessy, who was promoted to captaine de frégate during the cruise. The squadron arrived at Fort Royal on 5 October 1814. Vésuve departed Fort-de-France on 7 April 1815 and arrived at Rochefort on 8 August.

== Fate ==
On 31 July 1815, Vésuve received approval to serve as a headquarters hulk at Rochefort in place of Serpente. Vésuve was broken up in 1830.
