= Harry Graham (priest) =

Henry Burrans Graham, STD ( 29 August 1905 – 20 August 1979) was an English Anglican priest.

== Early life ==
The 2nd son of William and Elizabeth Turnbull, he was educated at King James's School, Almondbury Durham University and Ripon College, Wisconsin.

== Religious life ==
- Ordained, 1939
- Curate of Hitcham, Suffolk, 1939–41
- Chaplain RAF Wattisham, 1939–41
- St Edmundsbury and Ipswich Diocesan Secretary 1941–54
- Canon Residentiary of Ripon Cathedral, 1954–61
- Archdeacon of Richmond, 1954–61 to 1976.
- Vicar Blackawton, Devon 1961–63

== Death ==
Graham died on 4 July 1963.

Church of England titles
Preceded by William Stuart Macpherson	Archdeacon of Richmond; 1962–1976	Succeeded by John William Turnbull
