= John Rugge =

English priest

John Rugge was an English Anglican priest in the 16th century.

Rugge was created Archdeacon of Wells in place of John Cotterell in 1572. He died before Feb 1582.

Rugge was educated at the University of Oxford. He held livings at Winsford and Chedzoy.
