= Archdeacon of Richmond and Craven =

Archdiaconal post in the Church of England

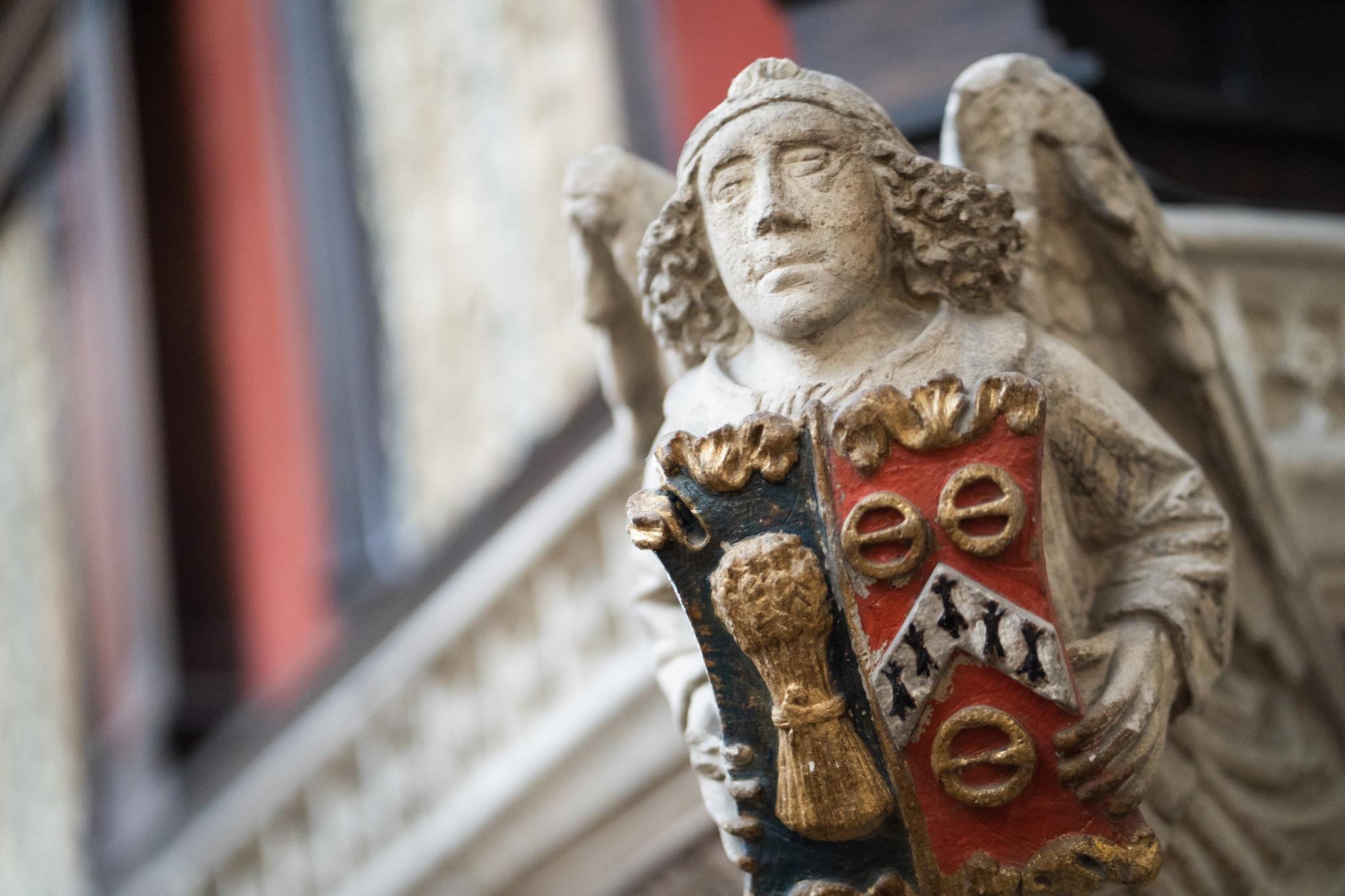
Dalby arms, detail from monument in York Minster to Thomas Savage, Archbishop of York 1501-7, showing arms of Thomas Dalby, Archdeacon of Richmond 1506–1526. The wheat-garb (impaling his personal arms) is stated in various antiquarian sources to be the heraldic device of the Archdeaconry of Richmond

The Archdeacon of Richmond and Craven is an archdiaconal post in the Church of England. It was created in about 1088 within the See of York and was moved in 1541 to the See of Chester, in 1836 to the See of Ripon and after 2014 to the See of Leeds, in which jurisdiction it remains today. It is divided into seven rural deaneries: Ewecross, Harrogate, Richmond, Ripon, Skipton, and Wensley, all in Yorkshire and Bowland in Lancashire.

== History ==
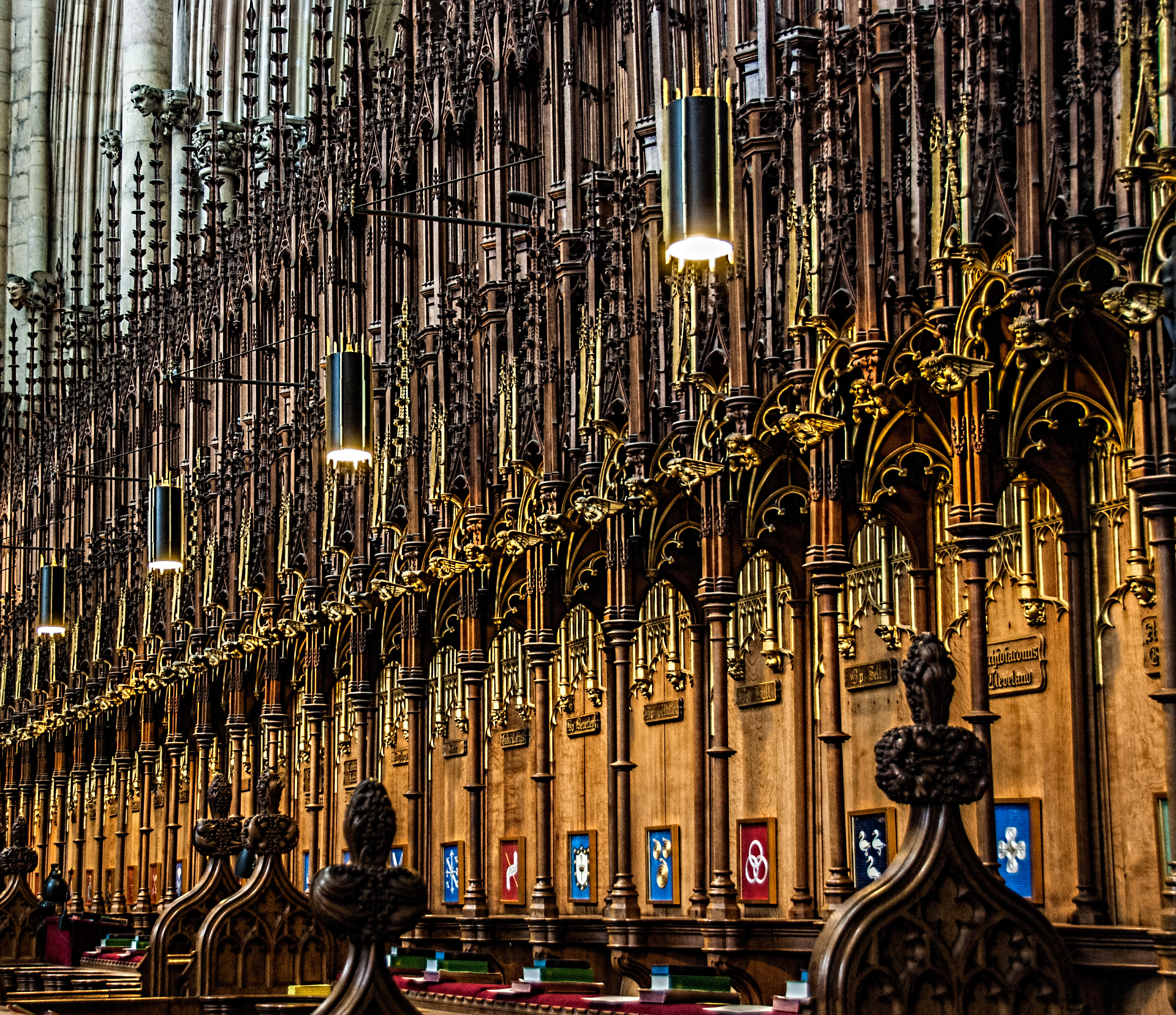
Prebendal stalls in the choir of York Minster, one of which was occupied by the Archdeacon of Richmond until 1836

The Archdeaconry of Richmond was created in about 1088 and was endowed by Thomas, Archbishop of York. Originally it comprised the western parts of Yorkshire (Richmondshire and Boroughbridge) and Lancashire (Amounderness Hundred, Lonsdale Hundred and Furness), as well as the greater portion of the counties of Cumberland (Borough of Copeland) and Westmorland (Barony of Kendal), and was the wealthiest and most extensive archdeaconry in England. Its valuable impropriations included Easingwold, Bolton, Clapham and Thornton Steward. However in 1127 King Henry I removed Allerdale and Cumberland from the Archdeaconry in order to form the new See of Carlisle. By way of compensation for this loss, Thurstan, Archbishop of York, conferred upon the Archdeacon all the privileges and prerogatives of a bishop, with the exception that he could not ordain, consecrate, or confirm. The Archdeacon had his own consistory court at Richmond in Yorkshire, where wills were proved, licences and faculties granted, and all matters of ecclesiastical cognizance dealt with. He exercised the sole supervision of clergy within his jurisdiction, including institution to, and removal from, benefices.

In 1541 King Henry VIII established the See of Chester in Lancashire, into which the office of Archdeacon of Richmond was incorporated, although its judicial powers were transferred to the See of York. Although its revenues suffered serious diminution and its position had become that of a commissary elected by the Bishop of Chester, the Archdeacon continued to exercise the same authority, judicial and otherwise, as his predecessors and retained his stall within the choir of York Minster. However by 1805 the position was described as a mere "sinecure".

In 1836 the Archdeaconry of Richmond was transferred to the jurisdiction of the newly formed See of Ripon in Yorkshire, and in January 1838 the consistory court of Richmond was abolished, along with all its other peculiars. On the creation of the See of Leeds in 2014, the Archdeaconry received the territory of the Archdeaconry of Craven and was renamed the "Archdeaconry of Richmond and Craven". It now forms the "Ripon episcopal area".

== List of archdeacons ==
Some archdeacons without territorial titles are recorded from around the time of Thomas of Bayeux; see Archdeacon of York.

=== High Medieval ===
- bef. 1128–1157 (dep.): Osbert de Bayeux (Note: Osbert does not occur with the title Archdeacon of Richmond; rather his territory can be deduced.)
- c. 1157–aft. 1164: Bartholomew
- bef. 1184–1189 (res.): Godfrey de Luci (became Bishop of Winchester)
- c. 1189–aft. 1196: William de Chemillé (also Bishop-elect of Avranches; became Bishop of Angers)
- c. 1196–1197 (res.): Eustace, Dean of Salisbury and Archdeacon of the East Riding
- bef. 1198–bef. 1199 (ej.): Honorius of Kent
- 1198–1202 (deprived): Roger de Sancto Edmundo
- 1199–aft. 1199 (exc.): Honorius (again)
- 1202–1208 (deprived): Honorius (third term)
- c. 1212: Morgan (royal bastard, sometime provost of Beverley and Bishop-elect of Durham)
- bef. 1213–1217 (res.): Richard Marsh
- bef. 1218–aft. 1238: William Langton (of Rotherfield)
- bef. 1239–aft. 1239: Walter de Woburn
- bef. 1240–bef. 1241: Robert Haget
- bef. 1241–aft. 1252: John le Romeyn the elder
- bef. 1253–aft. 1260: William
- bef. 1262–aft. 1269: Simon of Evesham
- bef. 1271–aft. 1271: Richard le Brun
- 5 December 1272–aft. 1273: Thomas Passelew
- bef. 1276–aft. 1278: Geoffrey de Sancto Marco
- 28 April 1279 – 12 May 1290 (res.): Henry of Newark
- 1290–aft. 1301: Gerard de Vuippens

=== Late Medieval ===
- bef. 1301–16 May 1317 (d.): Francesco Cardinal Caetani (cardinal-deacon of Santa Maria in Cosmedin)
- 25 April 1309 – 1310 (dep.): John Sandale (unsuccessfully opposed Caetani)
- 1317–1322 (res.): Roger Northburgh (became Bishop of Coventry and Lichfield)
- 2 November 1322 – 1328 (res.): Hélie de Talleyrand-Périgord, Bishop of Limoges
- 1328–January 1346 (d.): Robert Wodehouse
- 7 January–May 1346 (res.): John Gynwell
- June 1346–20 November 1348 (d.): Jean-Raymond Cardinal de Comminges, Cardinal-Bishop of Porto
- 1349–bef. 1359 (d.): Henry de Walton
- 13 December 1359–bef. 1383 (d.): Humphrey de Cherleton
- 1383–11 January 1385 (exch.): John Bacon
- 11 January 1385 – 1388 (res.): John Waltham (became Bishop of Salisbury)
- 1388–May 1400 (d.): Thomas Dalby (er)
- 19 May 1400 – 4 March 1401 (dep.): Stephen Scrope
- 4 March 1401 – 18 March 1402 (exch.): Nicholas Bubwith
- 18 March 1402–bef. 1418 (d.): Stephen Scrope (again)
- 6 September 1418–bef. 1442 (res.): Henry Bowet
- 8 November 1442 – 1450 (res.): Thomas Kempe (became Bishop of London)
- 8 February 1450 – 1454 (res.): William Grey
- 17 August 1454 – 1457 (res.): Lawrence Booth
- 17 October 1457 – 1459 (res.): John Arundel
- 21 May 1459 – 1465 (res.): John Booth
- 5 July 1465 – 1484 (res.): John Sherwood
- 2 January 1485 – 1485 (d.): Edward de la Pole
- 28 September 1485 – 1493 (res.): John Blyth
- 5 March 1494 – 1500 (res.): Christopher Urswick, Dean of York until 1494, Dean of Windsor from 1496 (also Archdeacon of Wilts, and Archdeacon of Norfolk (from 1500))
- 1500–1506 (res.): James Stanley
- 24 September 1506–bef. 1526 (d.): Thomas Dalby (yr)
- 1526–bef. 1529 (res.): Thomas Wynter (also Dean of Wells {until 1529}, Archdeacon of York, Archdeacon of Suffolk {1526–1529} and Archdeacon of Norfolk {from 1529})
- 7 December 1529 – 1541 (res.): William Knight

=== Early modern ===
On 14 August 1541, the Diocese of Chester was created from the Richmond and Chester archdeaconries.

- 1541–bef. 1554: John Bird, Bishop of Chester
- bef. 1554–bef. 1559 (dep.): John Horleston (deposed)
- bef. 1559–Oct 1559 (deprived): John Hansom (deprived)
- Oct 1559–bef. 1574: John Horleston (again)
- 17 March 1574–bef. 1603 (d.): Christopher Goodman
- 6 November 1603 – 1607 (res.): Thomas Mallory (became Dean of Chester)
- 21 December 1607 – 10 March 1648 (d.): Thomas Dod
- 20 May 1648–bef. 1664 (res.): Henry Bridgeman (also Dean from 1660)
- 10 June 1664 – 26 November 1678 (d.): Charles Bridgeman
- 3 December 1678 – 11 March 1695 (d.): Henry Dove
- 2 April 1695–bef. 1703 (d.): Thomas Lamplugh
- 10 September 1703 – 7 May 1729 (d.): William Stratford
- 4 June 1729 – 22 October 1781 (d.): Samuel Peploe
- 30 October 1781 – 15 April 1792 (d.): Thomas Townson
- 9 May 1792 – 11 March 1797 (res.): Thomas Breithweite (became Archdeacon of Chester)
- 25 April 1797 – bef. 1801 (d.): George Bower
- 14 January 1801 – 4 June 1824 (d.): John Owen
- 5 October 1824 – bef. 1826 (res.): Henry Law (became Archdeacon of Wells)
- 30 December 1826 – 4 May 1854 (d.): John Headlam

On 5 October 1836, the Diocese of Ripon was erected from the Richmond archdeaconry and part of the York diocese (which became the Archdeaconry of Craven.)

- 7 June 1854 – 21 June 1868 (d.): Charles Dodgson (father of Lewis Carroll)

=== Late modern ===
- 1868 – 1894 (ret.): Edwards Cust
- 1894 – 1907 (res.): William Danks (became a canon of Canterbury Cathedral)
- bef. 1909 – ?: Armstrong Hall (died 12 May 1921)
- 1921 – 1937 (ret.): Arthur Watson (afterwards archdeacon emeritus)
- 1937 – 22 September 1939 (d.): Claude Thornton
- 1940 – 1951 (ret.): Donald Bartlett
- 1951 – 1954 (res.): William MacPherson (became Dean of Lichfield)
- 1954 – 1961 (res.): Harry Graham
- 1972 – 1976 (ret.): John Turnbull (afterwards archdeacon emeritus)
- 1976 – 1983 (res.): Paul Burbridge (became Dean of Norwich)
- 1983 – 1993 (ret.): Norman McDermid (afterwards archdeacon emeritus)
- 1993 – 2006 (ret.): Ken Good (afterwards archdeacon emeritus)
- 19 May 2007 – 2 March 2013 (res.): Janet Henderson
- 1 February 2013 – 2 February 2014: Nicholas Henshall (acting Archdeacon; became Dean of Chelmsford)
- 2 February 2014 – 20 April 2014: Paul Slater, Archdeacon of Craven (acting Archdeacon)

=== Archdeacons of Richmond and Craven ===
- 20 April 2014 – 19 July 2015: Paul Slater, Archdeacon of Richmond and Craven
- 19 July 2015 – 17 January 2016 (Acting): Simon Cowling, Acting Archdeacon of Richmond and Craven
- 17 January 2016 – 18 October 2018 (res.): Bev Mason, Archdeacon of Richmond and Craven
- 10 March 2019 – 2025: Jonathan Gough (resigned early 2025 and made archdeacon emeritus)
- 6 April 2025 – present: James Theodosius

== See also ==
- Diocese of Chester

== Sources ==
- Greenaway, Diana E. (1999), Fasti Ecclesiae Anglicanae 1066–1300, vol. 6, pp. 47–52
- Jones, B. (1963), Fasti Ecclesiae Anglicanae 1300–1541, vol. 6, pp. 25–27
- Horn, Joyce M.; Smith, David M.; Mussett, Patrick (2004), Fasti Ecclesiae Anglicanae 1541–1857, vol. 11, pp. 47–49
- Horn, Joyce M.; Smith, David M.; Mussett, Patrick (2004), Fasti Ecclesiae Anglicanae 1541–1857, vol. 11, p. 130
