= Bryant Salmon =

English cleric

The Reverend Harold Bryant Salmon
- Born: 1891
- Died: 2 November 1965 (aged 73–74)
- Education: Haileybury and Imperial Service College, Jesus College, Cambridge
- Religion: Church of England
- Congregations served: St George Barrow in Furness, St Mary Redcliffe, St Michael Windmill Hill, Holy Trinity Southport, others
- Offices held: Archdeacon of Wells (1951–1962), Principal of Wells Theological College (1931–1947), Rector of Weston-Super-Mare (1947–1951), others

Harold Bryant Salmon (1891-1965) was a British Church of England priest, most notably Archdeacon of Wells from 1951 to 1962.

Higgins was educated at Haileybury; and Jesus College, Cambridge. During World War I he was a Lieutenant in the Royal Garrison Artillery. He was ordained deacon in 1919; and priest in 1920. His first post was as curate at St George Barrow in Furness., and his second as Vice Principal of Wells Theological College. After another curacy at St Mary Redcliffe, Bristol he was Vicar of St Michael, Windmill Hill, Bristol then Holy Trinity, Southport. He was Principal of Wells Theological College from 1931 to 1947; and Rector of Weston-Super-Mare from 1947 to 1951. He had a long association with Wells Cathedral:Prebendary of Taunton from 1930 to 1951; Chancellor from 1935 to 1947, and Sub-Dean from 1947 to 1951; Canon Residentiary from 1931 to 1947, and then again from 1951 to 1962; and Prebendary of Huish and Brent from 1951 to 1962.

He died on 2 November 1965.

Church of England titles
Preceded by Norman Higgins	Archdeacon of Wells; 1951–1962	Succeeded by John Lance
