= Ken Good (priest) =

English Anglican priest (1941–2025)

Kenneth Roy Good (28 September 1941 – 21 January 2025) was an English Anglican priest.

== Biography ==
The son of Isaac Edward Good and Florence Helen née White, he was educated at Stamford School and King's College, London.

Good was ordained deacon in 1967, and priest in 1968. After a curacy in Stockton on Tees he was with the Missions to Seamen from 1970 to 1985, serving in Antwerp, Kobe and London. He was Vicar of Nunthorpe from, 1985 to 1993; Rural Dean of Stokesley from 1989 to 1993, and Archdeacon of Richmond from 1993 to 2006.

Good died on 21 January 2025, at the age of 83.

Church of England titles
Preceded by Norman McDermid	Archdeacon of Richmond; 1993–2006	Succeeded by Janet Henderson
