= Claude Thornton =

British Anglican priest (died 1939)

Claude Cyprian Thornton (1878–1939) was an British Anglican priest, Archdeacon of Richmond from 1937 until his death on 22 September 1939.

Thornton was educated at Winchester College and Trinity College, Cambridge. Thornton was ordained in 1903. After curacies in St Helens, Merseyside and Bishopwearmouth he held incumbencies in Greasley and Sheffield. During World War I he served with the Royal Army Service Corps. After that he served in South London parishes until his Yorkshire appointment.

Church of England titles
Preceded by Arthur Watson	Archdeacon of Richmond; 1937–1939	Succeeded by Donald Bartlett
