= Robert Lewis Fitzgerald =

Vice-Admiral Sir Robert Lewis Fitzgerald KCH
- Born: 1776
- Died: 17 January 1844 (aged 69); Bath, Somerset
- Military career
- Allegiance: United Kingdom
- Branch: Royal Navy
- Service years: 1786–1844
- Rank: Vice-Admiral
- Commands: HMS Vesuvius; HMS Tonnant; HMS Triton; Isle of Wight Sea Fencibles
- Conflicts: French Revolutionary Wars; Invasion of Guadeloupe; Battle of Groix; Action of 30 May 1798; Napoleonic Wars
- Awards: Knight Bachelor

Vice-Admiral Sir Robert Lewis Fitzgerald KCH (1776 – 17 January 1844) was a British naval officer of the 18th and 19th centuries. He served throughout the French Revolutionary Wars, most notably commanding the bomb vessel HMS Vesuvius, but illness made him unable to go to sea during the Napoleonic Wars, with Fitzgerald instead commanding the Isle of Wight sea fencibles. Made a superannuated rear-admiral in 1825, he was restored as a vice-admiral in 1840.

== Early life ==
Robert Lewis Fitzgerald was born in 1776, descending from a younger branch of the ancient house of Leinster.

== Naval career ==
Fitzgerald joined the Royal Navy in March 1786 as a midshipman on board the frigate HMS Winchelsea commanded by Edward Pellew. With Winchelsea Fitzgerald spent three years on the Newfoundland Station. After this he served on the flagship of Rear-Admiral Philip Affleck, HMS Centurion, on the Jamaica Station. In 1794 Fitzgerald took part in the Invasion of Guadeloupe while serving on HMS Boyne. In February he was promoted to lieutenant and moved from Boyne to the recently captured ship-sloop HMS Avenger. Fitzgerald served on board Avenger until she returned to England under Edward Griffith in September. After this he gained employment on board the second-rate HMS London, the flagship of Rear-Admiral John Colpoys. In London Fitzgerald took part in the Battle of Groix on 23 June 1795 where three French ships of the line were captured.

In February 1797 Fitzgerald was promoted to commander and took command of HMS Vesuvius, an 8-gun bomb vessel. He bombarded Le Havre while in a squadron commanded by Sir Richard Strachan before taking part in the action of 30 May 1798, where he assisted in destroying the French 36-gun corvette Confiante. Fitzgerald and Vesuvius were then sent to the Mediterranean Sea. He was promoted to post-captain on 24 December 1798 and in February 1799 was given command of HMS Tonnant, which had been taken by the British at the Battle of the Nile. Fitzgerald sailed Tonnant to Gibraltar and then back to England where she was laid up in ordinary.

In early 1801 Fitzgerald was given command of the 32-gun frigate HMS Triton in the English Channel. He took the French letter of marque Le Jeune Theodore on 15 September, and Triton was paid off at Plymouth on 9 April 1802. After the Peace of Amiens ended on 18 May 1803 Fitzgerald looked to continue his naval service, but issues with his health meant that he was unable to secure an appointment at sea. Instead Fitzgerald was assigned as senior officer of the Sea Fencibles on the Isle of Wight, and commanded the naval district between Kidwelly and Cardigan in Wales. In July 1816 the Commissioners of the Navy attempted to elect Fitzgerald to the position of Governor of the Royal Naval Asylum, a large school. He was elected incorrectly and the appointment did not take place.

In June 1825 Fitzgerald was made a superannuated rear-admiral. This meant that he received the pay and title of a rear-admiral, but would not obtain further promotion by seniority. In January 1835 Fitzgerald was made a Knight Commander of the Royal Guelphic Order, and in November 1840 was restored to the navy list with the rank of vice-admiral of the blue. Fitzgerald died at Bath on 17 January 1844, aged 69, as a vice-admiral of the red.

== Family ==
Fitzgerald had one brother, Lieutenant-Colonel James Fitzgerald of the 3rd Regiment of Foot Guards who served as an equerry and aide-de-camp to the Duke of York, as well as deputy adjutant general in the Mediterranean, and died in 1802. In August 1800 Fitzgerald married Jane Welch (died 11 May 1841 aged 63), the daughter of Richard Welch who was a former chief justice of Jamaica. The couple had eleven children, including:

- Caroline Geraldine Fitzgerald (died 19 April 1822 aged 17)
- Charlotte Mary Fitzgerald (died 30 April 1823 aged 4)
- Lieutenant James Lewis Fitzgerald, a Royal Navy officer (drowned 30 April 1835 in Algoa Bay serving on HMS Melville aged 29) (Note: James was drowned along with his small boat's crew while attempting to save the life of Lieutenant John Gore who had in turn jumped into the sea to save a seaman who had fallen from the masts of Melville. Gore was the son of Admiral Sir John Gore, who had commanded Triton before Fitzgerald.)
- Georgina Favell Fitzgerald (died 19 November 1841 aged 24)
- George Milner Fitzgerald (died 27 April 1843 aged 27)
- Maria Phillipa Fitzgerald (died 18 July 1845 aged 33)
- Reverend Captain Gerald Stephen Fitzgerald, army officer and reverend of Highfield Church (died 13 August 1879 aged 69)
- Venerable August Otway Fitzgerald, the Archdeacon of Wells (died 24 December 1897 aged 84)
