= Edwards Cust =

Archdeacon of Richmond from 1868 until 1894 (1804–1895)

Edwards Cust (born Sedbergh 2 September 1804 – died Northallerton 5 July 1895) was Archdeacon of Richmond from 1868 until 1894.

Cust was educated at St John's College, Cambridge. He held livings at Danby Wiske, Yafforth and Hutton Bonville.

Church of England titles
Preceded by Charles Dodgson	Archdeacon of Richmond; 1868-1894	Succeeded by William Danks
