= Walter Farrer =

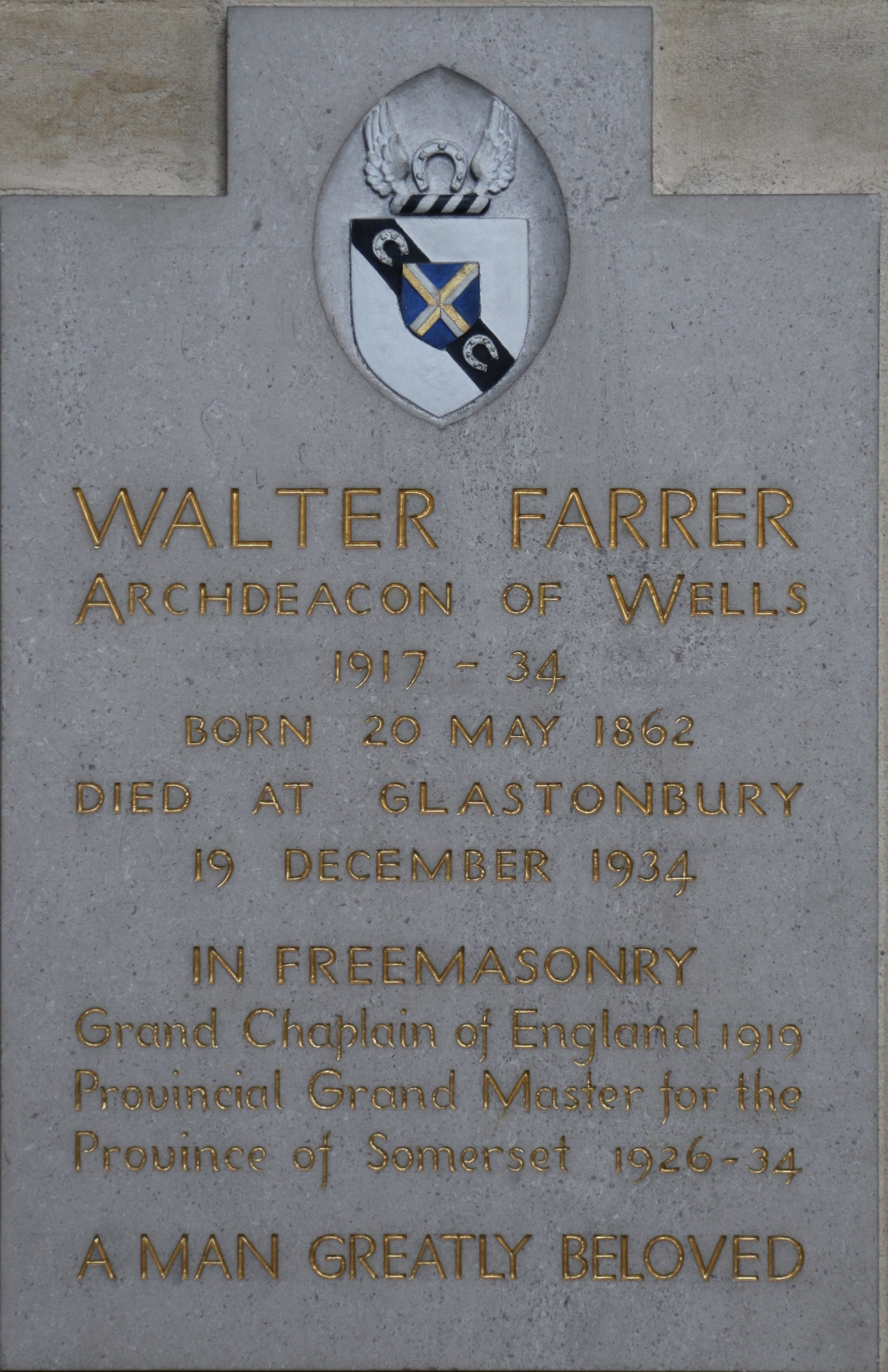
Memorial in Wells Cathedral.

Walter Farrer (18 May 1862 – 19 December 1934) was a British Church of England priest, most notably Archdeacon of Wells from 1917 until his death.

Farrer was educated at Balliol College, Oxford and Wells Theological College. He was ordained deacon in 1886, and priest in 1888. After a curacy in Leeds he became Rector of Wincanton in 1889; then Vicar of Chard, Somerset in 1897. He was then vicar of St Cuthbert, Wells from 1916 to 1919.

Church of England titles
Preceded by Frederick Brymer	Archdeacon of Wells; 1917–1934	Succeeded by George Hollis
