= Henry Law (priest) =

Anglican Dean (1797–1884)

- Born: 29 September 1797; Hertfordshire
- Died: 25 November 1884 (aged 87)
- Occupation: Priest
- Parent(s): George Henry Law; Jane Adeane

Henry Law (29 September 1797 – 25 November 1884) was Dean of Gloucester from 1862 until his death.

== Biography ==
Law was born at Kelshall rectory, Hertfordshire, on 29 September 1797. He was the third son of George Henry Law who was Bishop of Chester from 1812 to 1824 and later Bishop of Bath and Wells until his death in 1845. Henry Law was thus the grandson of Edmund Law who had been the Master of Peterhouse, Cambridge, from 1756 to 1768 and then Bishop of Carlisle until his death in 1787.

Law was educated at Eton College and St John's College, Cambridge, where he became a fellow in 1821. Later that year he was ordained and held incumbencies in Manchester then Childwall. He was Archdeacon of Richmond from 1824 to 1826 and Archdeacon of Wells from 1826 until his appointment to the deanery.

== Notable works ==
One of his most well-known works is entitled "Christ is All: The Gospel in the Pentateuch", which surveys typologies of Christ in the first five books of the Old Testament. It was originally published in 1867 by the Religious Tract Society. This book proved significant in the development of Hudson Taylor's notion of the "exchanged life".

== Notes ==
Church of England titles
Preceded by Edward Rice	Dean of Gloucester; 1862–1884	Succeeded by Edward Bickersteth
