= Henry Layng =

17th-18th century Anglican priest

Henry Layng D.D. was an Anglican priest in the late 17th and early 18th centuries.

Lever was educated at Trinity College, Dublin. He was Archdeacon of Wilts from 1716 until his death in 1726.
