= Hitcham, Suffolk =

Village in Suffolk, England

Coordinates: 52.117°N 0.9°E

Hitcham
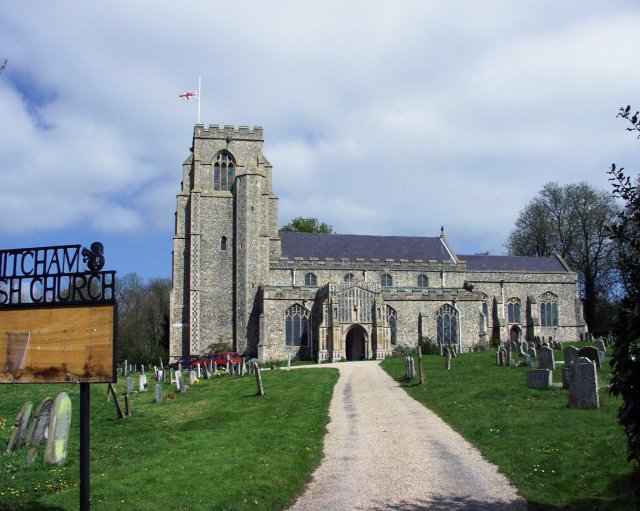
- All Saints church, Hitcham

- Location within Suffolk
- Population: 774 (2011)
- District: Babergh
- Shire county: Suffolk
- Region: East
- Country: England
- Sovereign state: United Kingdom
- Post town: Ipswich
- Postcode district: IP7

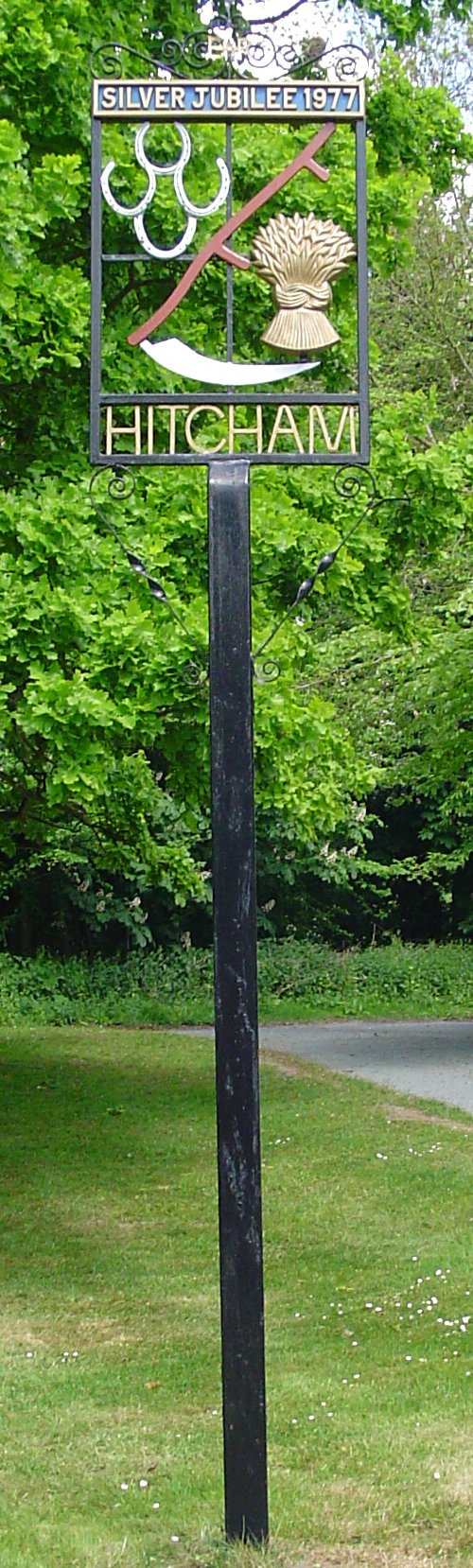
Signpost in Hitcham

Hitcham is a village and civil parish in Suffolk, England. Located on the B1115 road, between Hadleigh and Stowmarket, it is part of Babergh district. The parish contains the hamlets of Bird Street, Cook's Green and Cross Green. The population of the parish of Wattisham is also included.

== Notable residents ==
- John Spring (?-1547), cloth merchant
- Edmund Rous (by 1521 – 1572 or later), landowner, magistrate, MP and Vice-Treasurer of Ireland
- Nicholas Clagett the Younger (1654–1727), clergyman, controversialist, and Archdeacon of Sudbury
- William Burkitt (1650–1703), biblical expositor and vicar and lecturer
- John Stevens Henslow (1796–1861), clergyman, botanist and geologist, best remembered as friend and mentor of Charles Darwin.
- Harry Graham (1905–1979), Anglican priest and Archdeacon of Richmond
