= John Lance (priest) =

John Du Boulay Lance (14 March 1907 – 4 September 1991) was a British Church of England priest, most notably Archdeacon of Wells from 1963 until 1973.

Lancewas educated at Marlborough; Jesus College, Cambridge; and Ripon College Cuddesdon. He was ordained deacon in 1930; and priest in 1932. His first post was as curate at St Peter, Wolverhampton, and his second as Missioner at Trinity College, Oxford Mission, Stratford, London. He was a Chaplain to the Forces from 1941 to 1946. He held incumbencies at, successively, Bishops Lydeard, Taunton and Bathwick before his appointment as Archdeacon.

Church of England titles
Preceded by Harold Bryant Salmon	Archdeacon of Wells; 1963–1973	Succeeded by Peter Haynes
