= Otway Fitzgerald =

Venerable Augustus Otway Fitzgerald (20 May 1813 – 24 December 1897) was Archdeacon of Wells from 1863 until his death.

Fitzgerald was educated at Balliol College, Oxford, where he matriculated in 1831 and graduated B.A. in 1835. He held incumbencies at Fledborough, Charlton Mackrell and the Church of St Michael, Brent Knoll.

Fitzgerald died aged 84 on 24 December 1897 at Brent Knoll, Somerset.

== Family ==
Augustus Otway Fitzgerald was the son of Vice-Admiral Sir Robert Lewis Fitzgerald, K.C.H. He was baptised on 21 April 1813 at St Swithin's Church, Walcot, Bath, Somerset.

He married firstly Sarah Ann Procter on 7 February 1839 in St Michael the Archangel's Church, Laxton, Nottinghamshire; she died aged 21 on 7 February 1841 in Laxton Vicarage. There was one daughter, Sarah Ann Fitzgerald, who died at birth.

Fitzgerald married secondly Theresa Thring on 10 August 1843 in St Gregory's Church, Fledborough, Nottinghamshire. Children from this marriage included:

- Gerald Augustus Robert FitzGerald K.C. (1844–1925), barrister at aw
- Maurice Otho Fitzgerald (1845–1931), bank director
- Mabel Sarah Fitzgerald (1847–1939), unmarried.
