= Paul Burbridge =

British clergyman (1932–2021)

John Paul Burbridge (21 May 1932 – 22 November 2021) was the Dean of Norwich from 1983 to 1995.

Burbridge was born on 21 May 1932, and was educated at The King's School, Canterbury, King's College, Cambridge, New College, Oxford, and Wells Theological College. After National Service with the Royal Artillery, he was ordained to a curacy at Eastbourne Parish Church in 1959. In 1962 he was appointed vicar choral and chamberlain at York Minster. He was appointed residentiary canon precentor at York Minster in 1966. In 1976 he was appointed Archdeacon of Richmond and canon residentiary at Ripon Cathedral, a post he held until his appointment as Dean of Norwich in 1983 (F.S.A).

Burbridge had a particular interest in model engineering and church history. He married Olive in 1956, and they had four daughters and eleven grandchildren.

He died at his home on 22 November 2021, at the age of 89.

Church of England titles
Preceded by David Lawrence Edwards	Dean of Norwich; 1983–1995	Succeeded by Stephen George Platten
