= Monks Eleigh =

Village in Suffolk, England

Coordinates: 52.0917°N 0.8685°E

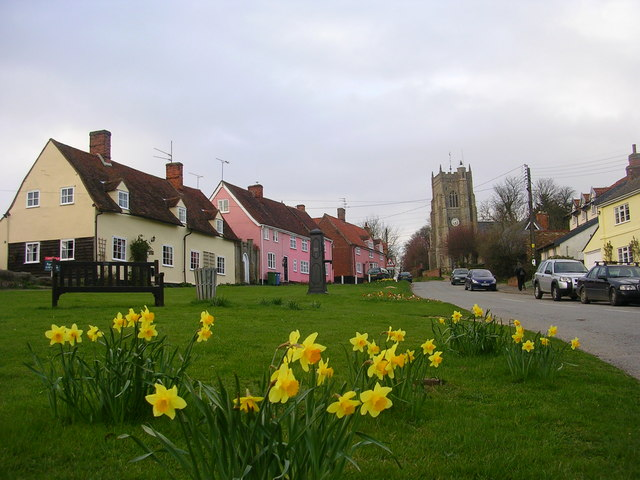
- Monks Eleigh

- Location within Suffolk
- Population: 505 (2011)
- District: Babergh
- Shire county: Suffolk
- Region: East
- Country: England
- Sovereign state: United Kingdom
- Post town: Ipswich
- Postcode district: IP7
- Dialling code: 01449
- UK Parliament: South Suffolk

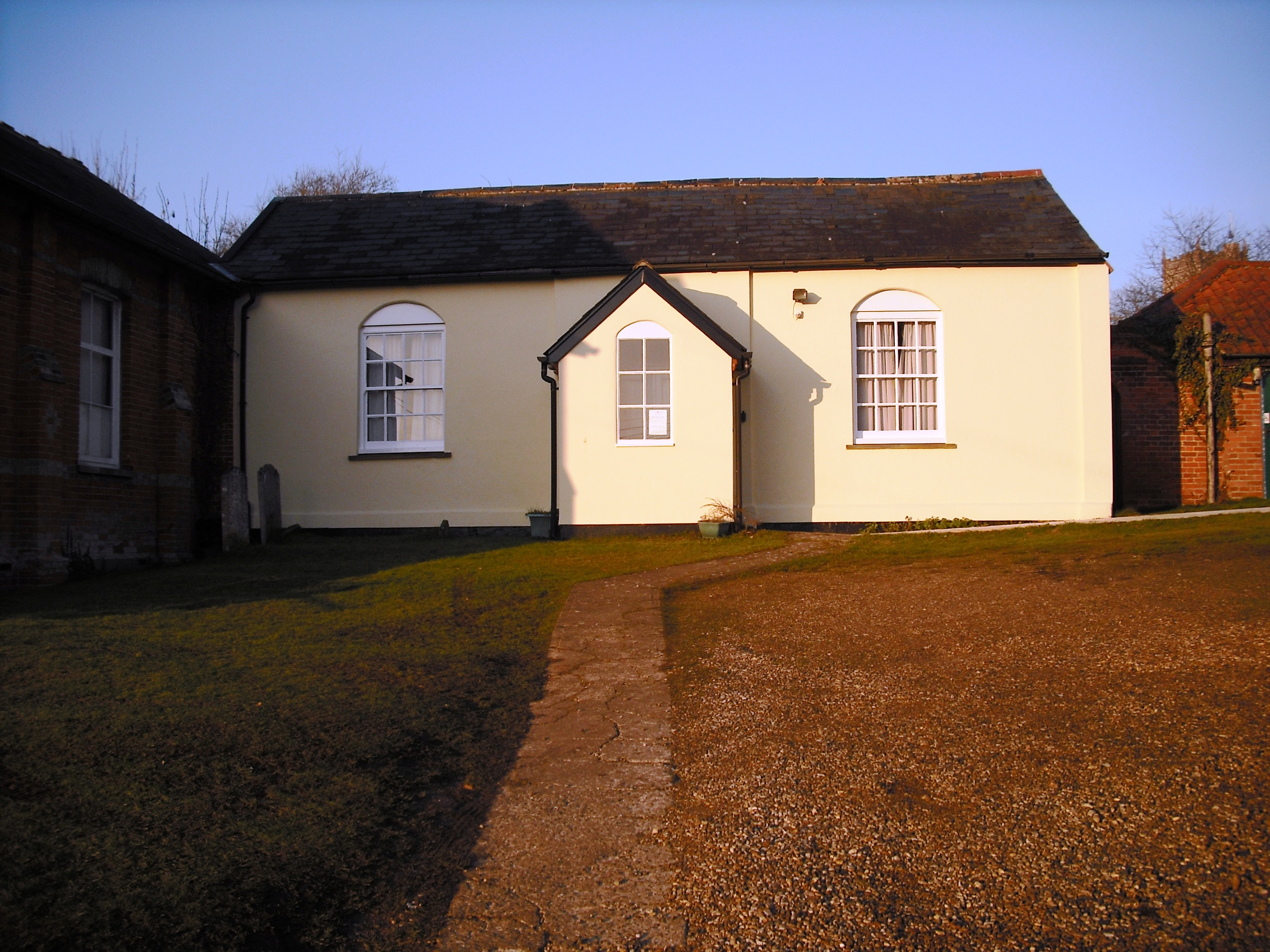
United Reformed Church

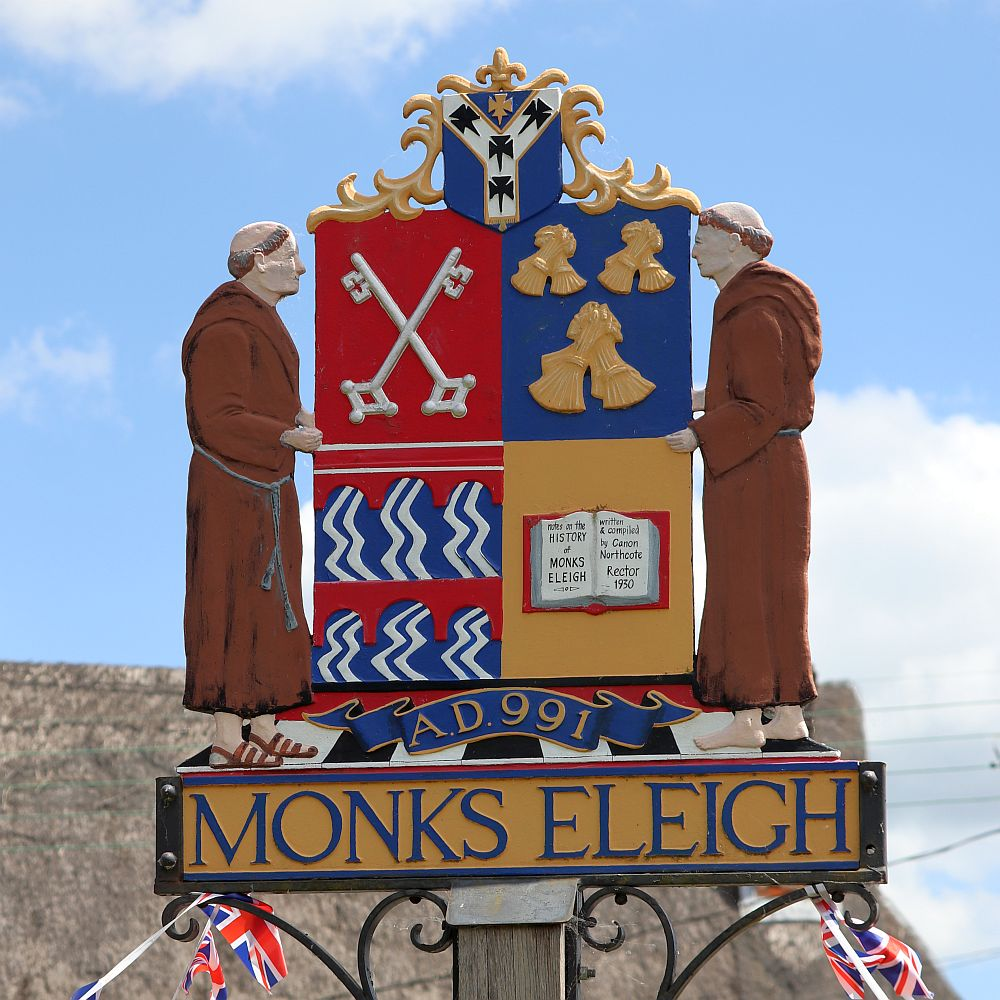
Monks Eleigh Village Sign

Monks Eleigh is a village and a civil parish in Babergh, Suffolk, United Kingdom, situated on the tributary to the River Brett in a rural area. The parish contains the hamlets of Swingleton Green and Stackyard Green.

== Notable buildings ==
The Anglican parish church of St. Peter's is on the site of a Saxon church and has a 15th-century tower which can be seen from the surrounding countryside. A Grade I listed building, it is surrounded by a graveyard and to the east of the church is a nature reserve. Above the chancel arch there is a large set of the royal arms of Queen Anne, comparable with those at St Mary's Church, Mildenhall.

Monks Eleigh Congregational Chapel, on Brent Eleigh Road, was founded in 1820. It is now a United Reformed Church church. Church books, including the history of the church, minutes, collection accounts, registers and membership roll, for the period 1824 to 1924, are held by the National Archives.

The Fenn is a Grade II* listed Georgian house at Swingleton Green.

Some houses on the village green on Church Hill date back to the 16th century, as does the Swan Inn. Modern buildings include the village hall on Church Green. There is also a community shop and post office next to the Swan Inn on the main Brent Eleigh Road.

== Swingleton Green and Stackyard Green ==
Swingleton Green and Stackyard Green are hamlets in the parish of Monks Eleigh.

Swingleton Green is located on a minor road called Back Lane. Nearby settlements include the villages of Monks Eleigh, Brent Eleigh, Chelsworth and Milden. The A1141 road and the B1115 road run nearby.
