= Archdeacon of Wells =

Church of England ecclesiastical office

The Archdeacon of Wells has been a senior clergy position in the Church of England Diocese of Bath and Wells since the English reformation, before which it was part of the Roman Catholic Church. The post, having oversight over the archdeaconry of Wells in Somerset has existed since the twelfth century. The archdeaconry includes seven deaneries.

== List of archdeacons ==
=== High Medieval ===
Archdeacons without territorial titles:

- bef. 1086–aft. 1088: Benselin, Archdeacon of Exon
- bef. 1106–aft. 1106: Walkerius (Note: Walkerius and Robert both occur with Gerbert Archdeacon of Bath, so they were each probably either Archdeacon of Wells or of Taunton.)
- bef. 1106–aft. 1106: Robert
- bef. 1120–aft. 1136: Arald (Note: Arald occurs with Gerbert Archdeacon of Bath, so he was probably either Archdeacon of Wells or of Taunton.)
- bef. 1122–bef. 1136: John de Bada (son of Hildebert) (Note: John occurs with Arald, so he was either Archdeacon of Bath, or of either Taunton or Wells (whichever Arald wasn't).)

Archdeacons of Wells:

- bef. 1142–aft. 1151: Eustace
- bef. 1159–aft. 1166: Robert
- bef. 1168–aft. 1194: Thomas of Earley (Erlegh) alias Agnellus
- bef. 1198–aft. 1199: Simon of Wells (later Bishop of Chichester)
- bef. 1204–1209 (res.): Hugh of Wells (became Bishop of Lincoln)
- bef. 1215–aft. 1231: William of Bardney
- bef. 1238–1248 (res.): William of Bitton (uncle; became Bishop of Bath and Wells)
- aft. 1248–bef. 1249 (res.): John of Bitton
- bef. 1249–aft. 1254: Peter Chaceporc
- bef. 1263–1267 (res.): William of Bitton (nephew) (became Bishop of Bath and Wells)
- 1267–1268 (res.): Godfrey Giffard (also Archdeacon of Barnstaple until May 1267; also Archdeacon of York from 1267; became Bishop of Worcester)
- bef. 1269–aft. 1269: S. (i.e. either Simon de Micham or Stephen of Chichester)
- bef. 1270–1284 (res.): Thomas Bytton (became Dean of Wells)
- bef. 1286–aft. 1295: Walter Haselshaw (later Dean of Wells)
- bef. 1295–24 January 1303 (d.): Peter de Insula (previously Archdeacon of Exeter)

=== Late Medieval ===
- aft. 1303–24 May 1326 (res.): Thomas de Charlton
- 24 May–13 June 1326 (exch.): Wibert de Lutleton
- 13 June 1326–bef. 1334: Robert de Wamberg (bishop's candidate; admitted but disputed by king's candidates)
- 29 June 1329 – 1330: Simon de Montacute (royal grant; never admitted)
- 15 October 1330 – 1332: Thomas Upton (royal grant; never admitted)
- bef. 1334–aft. 1336: Robert Mortimer
- bef. 1344–aft. 1344: Hugh
- bef. 1346–1352 (res.): Thomas Fastolf (became Bishop of St David's)
- 3 January 1353 – 12 June 1361 (d.): William de Court OCist
- 27 October 1361–bef. 1369 (res.): Étienne Cardinal Aubert (Cardinal-deacon of Santa Maria in Aquiro)
- 21 February 1369 – 22 July 1376 (d.): Simon Cardinal Langham OSB (former archbishop of Canterbury; cardinal-priest of San Sisto Vecchio until 1373, then Cardinal-Bishop of Palestrina; also Archdeacon of York from 1374)
- bef. 1385–aft. 1388: Andrew Baret
- 1386–aft. 1391: John de Rypon (royal grant)
- 13 September 1388: John Beer (unsuccessful royal grant)
- 6 June 1391: Thomas Tuttebury (unsuccessful royal grant; became Dean of Wells)
- 28 August 1391 – 4 May 1398 (exch.): Nicholas Slake
- 4 May 1398–bef. 1419 (d.): John Ikelyngton
- 13 April 1419–bef. 1449 (d.): Thomas Bubwith
- 15 April 1450 – 1 April 1470 (d.): Andrew Holes
- bef. 1471–bef. 1473 (d.): Thomas Bridlington
- 12 April 1473–bef. 1494 (res.): William Nykke
- 10 July 1494 – 1500 (res.): Richard Nykke (became Bishop of Norwich)
- 30 December 1500–bef. 1502 (res.): François de Busleyden, Archbishop of Besançon
- 19 November 1502 – 1507 (d.): Thomas Beaumont (previously Archdeacon of Bath)
- 1 January 1508 – 26 December 1546 (res.): Polydore Vergil (also called Castellensis)

=== Early modern ===
Archdeaconry resigned to the crown and abolished, 1547.

- bef. 1547–aft. 1554: Vergil still called Archdeacon of Wells
- bef. 1554–?: Cotterell already called Archdeacon of Wells

Archdeaconry re-erected, 1556.

- bef. 1559–1572 (d.): John Cotterell
- bef. 1572–bef. 1582 (d.): John Rugge
- March 1582–?: Bartholomew Clerke (a layman)
- 4 February 1589–aft. 1605: John Langworth
- 1611–aft. 1645: Gerard Wood
- 1645–bef. 1649: William Watts (never took possession)
- 1660–27 April 1680 (d.): Grindal Sheafe
- 28 April 1680 – 1683 (d.): Charles Thirlby
- 10 November 1683 – 8 October 1705 (d.): Edwin Sandys
- 11 October 1705 – 7 March 1716 (d.): Samuel Hill
- 4 May 1716 – 24 November 1726 (d.): Henry Layng
- 7 December 1726 – 1 October 1739 (d.): Edmund Archer (previously Archdeacon of Taunton)
- 26 November 1739 – 14 November 1742 (d.): John Wicksted
- 24 November 1742 – 20 April 1749 (d.): George Shakerley
- 19 August 1749 – 7 November 1757 (d.): Edmund Aubery
- 26 April 1758 – 26 February 1760 (d.): Lionel Seaman (previously Archdeacon of Taunton)
- 9 August 1760 – 1 October 1767 (d.): Francis Potter (previously Archdeacon of Taunton)
- 20 October 1767 – 12 May 1815 (d.): William Willes (previously Archdeacon of Taunton)
- 7 July 1815 – 5 April 1826 (d.): Charles Sandiford
- 4 October 1826 – 1862 (res.): Henry Law (became Dean of Gloucester)

=== Late modern ===
- 1862–?: Fitzhardinge Portman (died 1893)
- April 1863–24 December 1897 (d.): Augustus Otway Fitzgerald, Rector of Charlton Mackrell (St Mary) until 1876, then Vicar of Brent Knoll
- March 1898–20 September 1899 (d.): Edwin Arthur Salmon, Vicar of Brent Knoll
- 1899–1 May 1917 (d.): Frederick Brymer, Rector of Charlton Mackrell (St Mary)
- 1917–19 December 1934 (d.): Walter Farrer, Vicar of St Cuthbert's, Wells until 1919
- 1935–1940 (res.): George Hollis, Bishop suffragan of Taunton
- 1940–1951 (ret.): Walter Norman Higgins, Rector of Mells until 1944
- 1951–1962 (ret.): Harold Bryant Salmon
- 1963–1973 (ret.): John Lance
- 1974–1982 (res.): Peter Haynes (became Dean of Hereford)
- 1983–1993 (ret.): Ted Thomas
- 1993–2003 (ret.): Richard Acworth
- 2003–2006: Peter Maurice (became Bishop suffragan of Taunton)
- April 2007 – 17 September 2016 (res.): Nicola Sullivan (became Dean of Southwell)
- 5 September 2016 – 20 May 2017: Kevin Roberts (Acting)
- 20 May 2017 – 10 May 2026: Anne Gell (took sabbatical to, January–September 2024, to serve as Acting Dean of Wells)
- 6 January 2023 – 1 September 2024: Charlie Peer (Acting) became Archdeacon of Bath)
- 11 May 2026 - 6 December 2026 (ret.): Jonathan LLoyd (Acting)
- from 6 December 2026: Joanna Stobart

== Sources ==
- Greenway, Diana E. (2001), Fasti Ecclesiae Anglicanae 1066–1300, vol. 7, pp. 25–26
- Greenway, Diana E. (2001), Fasti Ecclesiae Anglicanae 1066–1300, vol. 7, pp. 31–35
- Jones, B. (1964), Fasti Ecclesiae Anglicanae 1300–1541, vol. 8, pp. 12–14
- Horn, Joyce M.; Bailey, Derrick Sherwin (1979), Fasti Ecclesiae Anglicanae 1541–1857, vol. 5, pp. 9–11
