= Brent Eleigh =

Village in Suffolk, England

Coordinates: 52.1°N 0.833°E

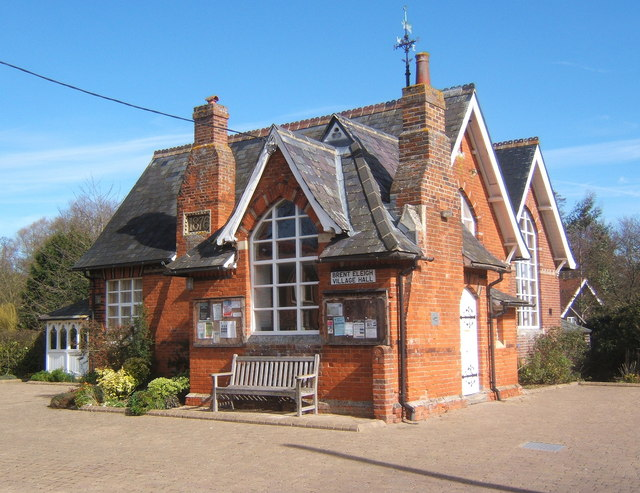
- Brent Eleigh village hall

- Location within Suffolk
- Area: 6.55 km^{2} (2.53 sq mi)
- Population: 174 (2011)
  - Density: 27/km^{2} (70/sq mi)
- District: Babergh
- Shire county: Suffolk
- Region: East
- Country: England
- Sovereign state: United Kingdom
- Post town: Sudbury
- Postcode district: CO10

Brent Eleigh is a village and civil parish in the Babergh district of Suffolk, England. Located between Hadleigh and Lavenham, in 2005 it had a population of 180 reducing to 174 at the 2011 census.

According to Eilert Ekwall the possible meaning of the village name is Ilega's meadow, which was burnt before 1254. The village is mentioned in the Domesday Book of 1086, at which time it and neighbouring Monks Eleigh had a population of 61.

The male population was 83, and female population was 91 according to the 2011 census.

== History ==
Brent Eleigh Manor was originally owned by the Illeigh/Ely family, then taken over by the Shelton family in the 13th century till the 16th/17th century. When Samuel Colman bought the manor from Robert Jermyn of Rushbrook in 1607 he established what was to be a long period of association of his family with the village. Samuel's second son, Thomas Colman was presented to the vicarage in 1625. Thamas's only son Edward Colman was born in Brent Eleigh on 17 May 1636.

In the 1870s, Brent Eleigh was described as:

The church shows Norman features, has a later English tower, and is good; and there are charities £90. A market was formerly held in the parish.

As well as the possible meaning of the village name, Brent Eleigh, derives from brende, meaning burnt in Middle English, and the Old English word lēah, meaning a forest.

The village was not only a market town under the reign of Henry III, but also one of the 'cloth villages', where Lavenham merchants had wool spun for them. St Mary's Church revealed a remarkable wall of 14th century paintings in 1961, and the act of the repairs that were to be taken place, created an important feature in Suffolk, and a landmark in the village.

=== Occupation ===
A chart showing the 1881 occupational structure of males and females

The occupational structure in 1881 was somewhat different from the present. A large number of females' occupation was unknown, however, more females than men had professional occupations, including subordinate medical service and schoolmaster. Also more females were employed in domestic offices or services. In 1881, Brent Eleigh relied heavily on the agriculture sector as a main source of income. Brent Eleigh's rural location is a reason for the reliance on the agricultural sector.

In 1831, the population in the village was 290, and 51 of the residents were labourers and servants, which was the most common occupation, due to the basic skills needed compared to that of a professional, such as a headmaster.

In the 2011 census, the sector of occupation that most people were employed as were Managers, Directors and Senior Officials, with 23 people. On the whole, 79 residents aged 16 to 74 were in employment in Brent Eleigh in 2011. There were 34 females and 45 males in employment between the ages of 16 and 74. Compared to the occupations in 1881, more females are involved in occupations such as Manager, director and senior official roles, instead of domestic services and servants like in 1881.

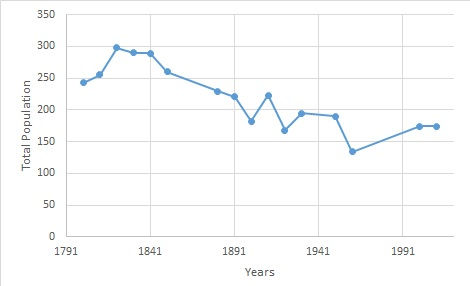
Total population of Brent Eleigh Civil Parish, Suffolk from 1801 to 2011

=== Population ===
Brent Eleigh is a small village, therefore the population has never been large; however, in 1801, there were 243 residents compared to 174 in the last census in 2011. The population has fluctuated over the past couple of centuries, peaking at 298 in 1821 and being at its lowest in 1961 with 134 residents. Between 1911 and 1921, the population fell from 223 to 168, and in this period was World War I, demonstrating one cause for the rapid fall in locals. High population growth, by the 1970s, had spread to East Anglia, where the county of Suffolk is located.

== Geography ==
Brent Eleigh is situated along the A1141 as well as the River Brett, which runs towards surrounding settlements such as Chelsworth. Comparing a map of the area from 1885 to 1886 and a map from 1974 to 1978 has resulted in slight differences, for example slightly more housing, however on the whole, the village has not undergone any significant changes, keeping it as an old traditional English rural village.

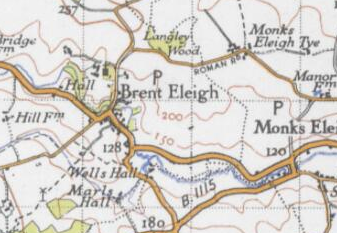
20th-century map of Brent Eleigh including neighbouring areas

== Transport ==
Brent Eleigh's rural location determines the accessibility of public services. The nearest railway station is Sudbury which is 6.96 miles (11.20 km) away. Vehicle ownership is high compared to the population of village, with 125 cars and vans registered in the area. The isolation of the village, with a lack of public transport close by is one reason behind high vehicle ownership. The bus service goes from Hadleigh to Sudbury, stopping at Brent Eleigh, however the service is not frequent, therefore cannot be relied upon at certain times and certain days.

== Places of interest ==
=== Brent Eleigh Hall ===
Brent Eleigh Hall's early history is unknown; however, its appearance now is Georgian. Sir Edwin Lutyens produced the impressive door case in 1933–34, which is one feature that makes the hall a place of interest, and adds to its history.

Within the grounds is a beautiful Victorian walled kitchen garden spread over nearly two acres, which requires resuscitation.

The Hall lies to the north of the village, close to St Mary's Church, and is a listed building. The portrait of Richard Colman was at Brent Eleigh Hall but was later passed to the Tate in 1997. The Colman line ended in 1739 with the death of Edward Colman. The Hall was taken over by the Goates, then later the Browns. The estate was sold in 1922 to the Barran family. During the Second War the hall was lived in by Sir Connop Guthrie Bt and family, who is commemorated on a plaque in the church. The US Air Force were at Lavenham Airifeld and used the Hall as a popular way mark, it being a distinctive colour, known as the Perpermint Palace. Sir David Barran was Chairman of Shell UK, and it is said the Brent Oil Field is named after Brent Eleigh. Following the death of Lady Barran, it became empty until 2015, and since subject of major restoration.

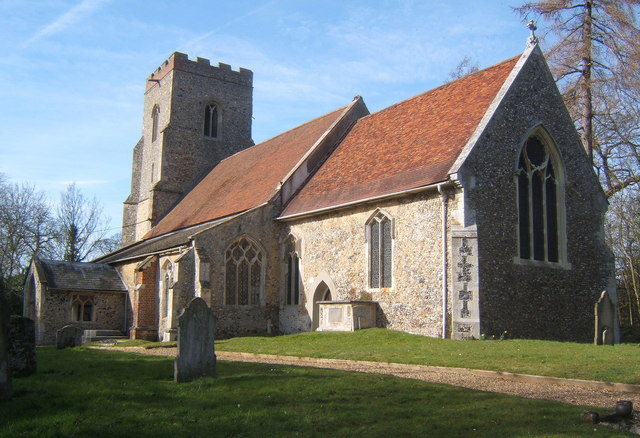
St Mary's Church, built in the 14th century

=== St Mary's Church ===
This 13th-century church has not had as big of an impression as people first expected, when the 14th-century paintings were first discovered, and is not known widely for its significant and impressive features.

In the centre is the crucifixion, at once a delightful example of medieval folk art, and yet also one of the most powerful medieval images in the Suffolk canon.

The Harrowing of Hell is placed beside the crucifixion, an image that is usually associated with Orthodox churches. The memorial of Edward Colman, a family member who owned Brent Eleigh Hall, is located in the chancel.

St Mary's church is situated on Hall Road, off of the A1141 main road and is externally decorated, expressing its Victorian window to the east and the sanctuary contains "the three-sided communion rails", which there are only a few of in East Anglia.

The church being open for visitors, sadly led to the vandalism of the wall paintings in late 2016, but they have happily since been restored by one of the UK's top conservation specialists.
