= Charles Dodgson =

Charles Dodgson may refer to:

- Charles Lutwidge Dodgson (1832–1898), better known by the pseudonym Lewis Carroll, renowned children's and fantasy author
- Charles Dodgson (bishop) (c. 1722–1795), Anglican Bishop of Elphin, grandfather of the priest
- Charles Dodgson (priest) (1800–1868), Anglican Archdeacon of Richmond, father of the author
