= Samuel Estwick =

British politician

Samuel Estwick (c. 1736–1795) was a West India planter and British politician who sat in the House of Commons from 1779 to 1795.

Estwick was the third, but only surviving son of Richard Estwick of Barbados and his wife Elizabeth Rous, daughter of John Rous of Barbados. He was possibly educated at Eton College and matriculated at Queen's College, Oxford on 10 October 1753, aged 17. He entered Inner Temple in 1752. In 1753 he succeeded to the estates of his father. He married firstly Elizabeth Frere daughter of Lieutenant-Colonel John Frere, Governor of Barbados before 24 March 1763. He became assistant agent for Barbados in 1763. His first wife died in 1766 and he married secondly Grace Langford daughter of Jonas Langford of Theobald’s Park, Hertfordshire and formerly of Antigua, on 11 May 1769. In 1778 he was promoted to agent for Barbados and held the post until 1792.

Estwick was a political pamphleteer and his works included “A Vindication of the Ministry’s Acceptance of the Administration” (1765), Consideration on the Nego Cause (1772) and “A Letter to the Rev. Josiah Tucker” (1776). These made him well known and he became acquainted with Lord Abingdon, who shared his views. Abingdon brought him into Parliament as Member of Parliament for Westbury at a by-election on 20 March 1779. He was returned again unopposed in the 1780 general election. He made his first speech on 23 January 1781, when he presented a petition from Barbados for relief for the sufferers in a hurricane. Two further speeches in this session were on matters connected with Barbados. The English Chronicle wrote about him: “He does not possess the gift of oratory, and never delivers his opinion in the House upon any but mercantile subjects, but constantly attends his duty, and votes upon all questions, with Opposition. He enjoys very large possessions in the West India islands, and is said to have been included as a very considerable sufferer in the dreadful calamity which has recently taken place in that quarter. He has not distinguished himself in the political world by any other circumstance, than by the zeal of his opposition to the measures of the present Administration.”

Following a change of government in 1782 he was considered for various posts. He was appointed Deputy Paymaster in August 1782 until April 1783 and then again from 1784 until his death. He became registrar of Chelsea Hospital, and searcher of the customs at Barbados in 1783 and from January 1784 until his death. He was returned for Westbury again unopposed in 1784 and 1790. Nearly all his speeches after 1790 were on the abolition of the slave trade which he recommended be carried out gradually. In 1795 his son Samuel joined him at Westbury.

His daughter Charlotte was the second wife of John Denison, MP for various constituencies 1796-1812.

Estwick died on 19 November 1795.

Parliament of Great Britain
Preceded by Hon. Thomas Wenman; Nathaniel Bayly	Member of Parliament for Westbury; 1779–1795; With: Hon. Thomas Wenman 1779–1780 (Sir) John Whalley-Gardiner 1780–1784; Chaloner Arcedeckne 1784–1786; John Madocks 1786–1790; Ewan Law 1790–1795; Samuel Estwick 1795	Succeeded by Samuel Estwick; Edward Wilbraham-Bootle
