= John Howard (mathematician) =

British schoolmaster and poet

John Howard (1753–1799), was a British schoolmaster and poet who as a mathematician worked on the geometry of the sphere.

== Biography ==
Howard was born in the Fort George garrison, near Inverness, in 1753. He was the son of Ralph Howard, a private in the British Army, and he was brought up by relations in Carlisle. After being apprenticed to an uncle as a cork-cutter at the age of thirteen, he worked as a sailor, carpenter and flax-dresser. After developing interests in reading and mathematics, he opened a school near Carlisle. Under the patronage of Edmund Law, Bishop of Carlisle, he was appointed master at the Carlisle Grammar School. A love affair forced him to abandon a plan to become a priest of the Church of England, and instead when the bishop's son John Law was appointed bishop of Clonfert in 1782 Howard became his steward. In 1786, Howard lost his job and had to return to Carlisle after "an unfortunate marriage". Loss of the stewardship forced him to resume teaching until 1794, when he moved to Newcastle-on-Tyne. There, he rented the school-house built by Dr Charles Hutton and gained a position as instructor. 1798 saw the appearance of his long-projected Treatise on Spherical Geometry, after which his health rapidly declined. He died on 26 March 1799, aged 46, near Newcastle, and was buried in St John's churchyard. The epitaph on Howard's tombstone records many other ingenious mathematical and poetical pieces.
