= Parham, Suffolk =

Village and civil parish in Suffolk, England

Coordinates: 52.196°N 1.376°E

Parham
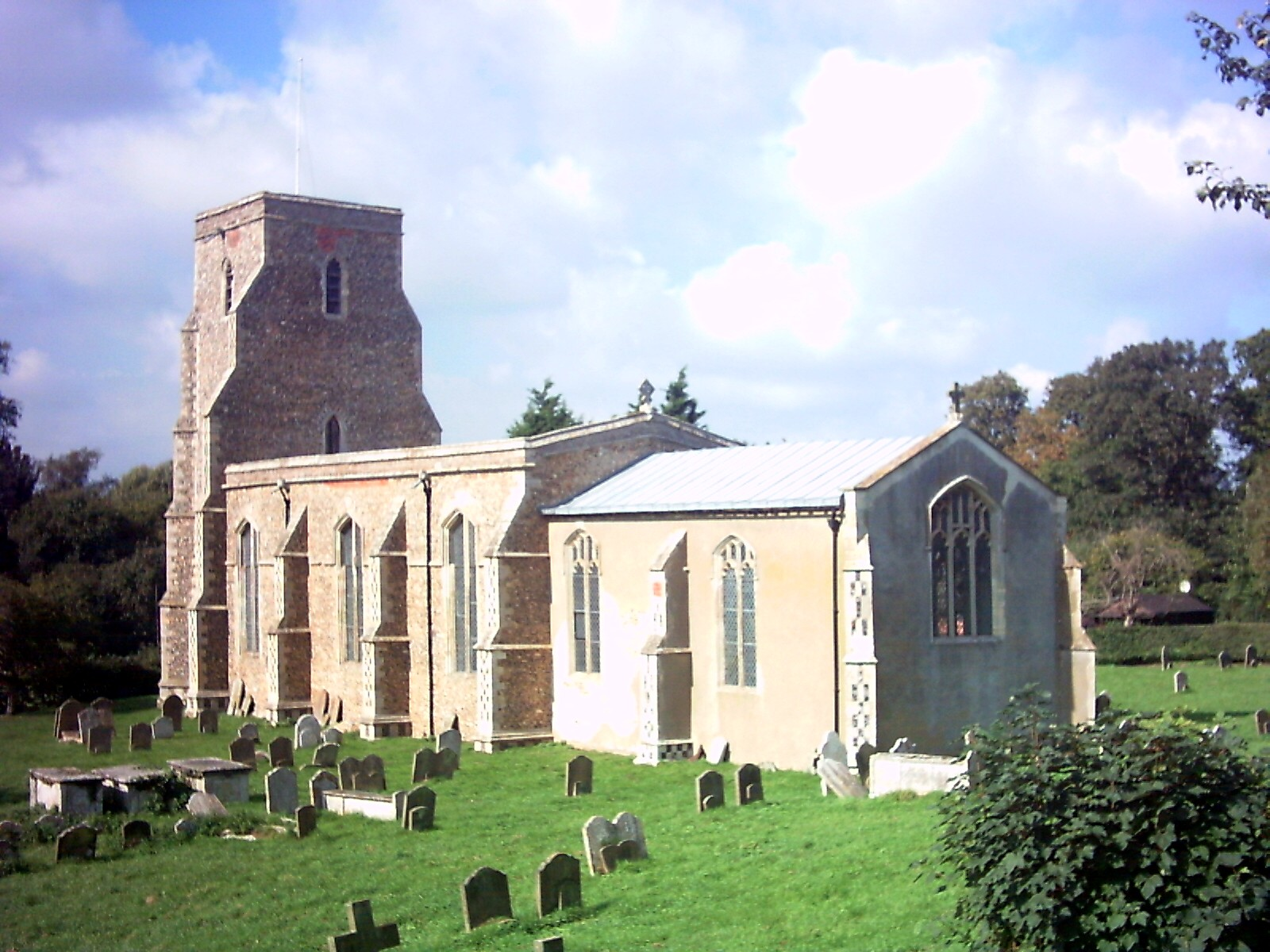
- Parham, Church of St Mary

- Location within Suffolk
- Population: 263 (2011)
- Civil parish: Parham
- District: East Suffolk
- Shire county: Suffolk
- Region: East
- Country: England
- Sovereign state: United Kingdom
- Post town: Woodbridge
- Postcode district: IP13
- Police: Suffolk
- Fire: Suffolk
- Ambulance: East of England
- UK Parliament: Central Suffolk and North Ipswich

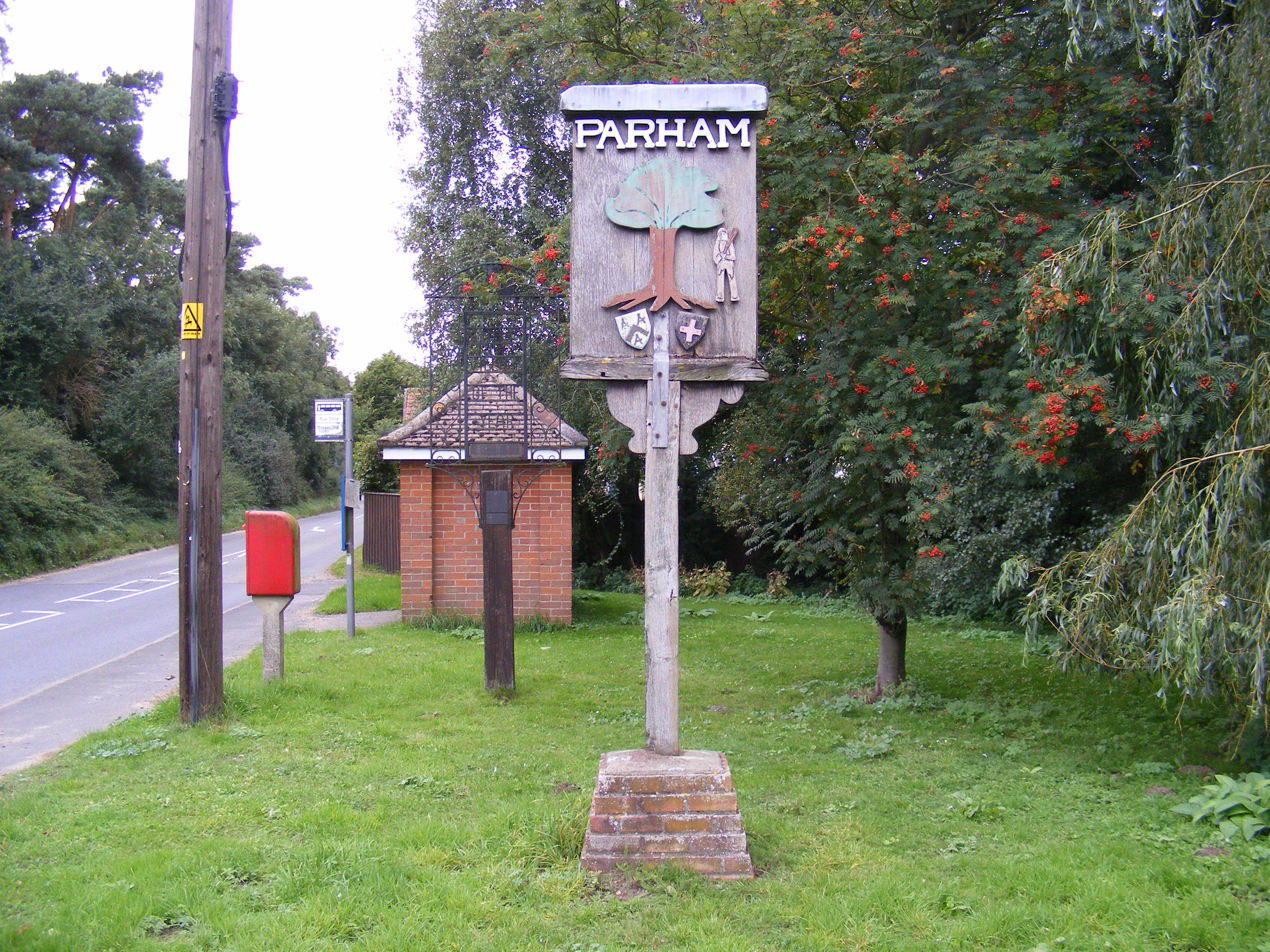
Parham village sign, 2008

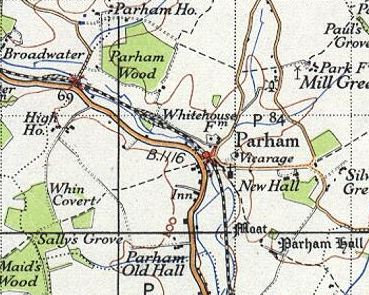
1945 map of Parham

Parham is a village and civil parish in the East Suffolk district of Suffolk in eastern England. Located seven miles north of Woodbridge, in 2005 it had a population of 300, reducing to 263 at the 2011 census and according to the 2011 census there were 129 males and 134 females living at this time.

The flint-built parish church of St Mary, though restored in 1886, dates from the late 14th Century and was likely built for William de Ufford. The Rood screen is from the 15th Century. Parham is located on the B1116. William Willoughby, 1st Baron Willoughby of Parham is interred in the church, too.

Parham Airfield Museum is located nearby. Parham railway station, on the Framlingham Branch, was shut to passenger traffic in November 1952.

Between 1870 and 1872 John Marius Wilson's Imperial Gazetteer visited Parham and wrote the following as an entry for the parish.

PARHAM, a village and a parish in Plomesgate district, Suffolk. The village stands on the river Ore, adjacent to the Framlingham branch of the East Suffolk railway, 2¼ miles S S E of Framlingham; and has a station on the railway, and a post-office under Wickham-Market. The parish comprises 2, 212 acres.

== Occupation structure ==
The occupational structure (1881) of Parham was very agricultural based although there are a lot of 'unspecified' or 'unknown'. There were 77 males and 3 females working in farming and agriculture in 1881 There was 1 male who was employed in the armed forces as seen in the occupational structure graph below. There were 2 males employed in the conveyance of goods, men and messages, these people working as railway officials or servants. There were 2 female dominated positions in the village in 1881; these were Domestic Offices or Services, in which 1 male and 19 females worked, and education and religion in which 1 male and 15 females were employed.

The occupation of the population of Parham in 2001 was very different to the occupational structure in 1881. The total number of the population in Parham, aged 16–71, that was in employment in 2001 was 132. The breakdown of this shows that 17 people from Parham worked in agriculture, relating to hunting and forestry, around 12% of the working population. There were 11 people working in manufacturing, 3 people from Parham were in employment by electricity, gas and water supply, 15 people worked in construction, 17 people who lived in Parham worked as a wholesaler or retail trade, and the repair of motor vehicles, 6 people worked in Hotels or catering, 8 people, worked in transport storage and communication. 3 people worked in financial intermediation, 16 people worked in real estate 7 people worked in public administration. 10 people were in full-time education, 12 were employed into health and social work and finally, 7 people were employed as "other". The 2011 census also asked for peoples industries and occupation, there were more people working in Parham in 2011, rising to 137 from 132. The breakdown shows that 7 people worked in agriculture, forestry and fishing, with 1 person working in mining and quarrying, and 12 people working in various manufacturing jobs. 1 person worked in water supply, sewerage, waste management and remediation services, 6 people worked in construction, and 22 people or 16% of the working population worked in wholesale and retail trade, this includes the repair of motor vehicles and motorcycles. 3 people work in transport and storage, whilst 7 people worked in accommodation and food service activities. 8 people worked in information and communication and 2 people worked in financial and insurance activities, with 1 person working in real estate. 13 people worked in professional scientific and technical activities. 8 people were employed in administrative and support service activities, and 8 people were also employed in public administration and defence. 16 people were working in education. 19 people worked in human health and social work. whilst 2 people worked in arts, entertainment and recreation, with 1 person working in household activities as an employer.

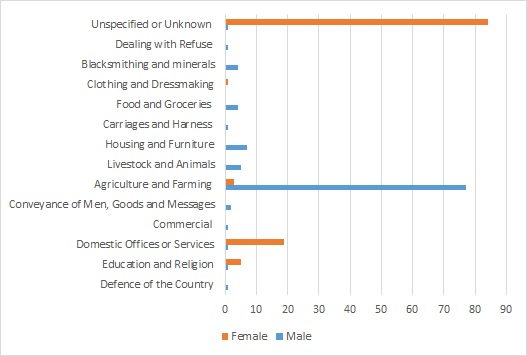
Graph Showing Parham Occupation structure taken from 1881 census data

== Population ==
Population of Parham 1801 -2011 shows that Parham's population has been declining, going from 399 in 1801, to 263 in 2011. There has been some fluctuation in the population of Parham however, rising to a high of 532 in 1851 after rising steadily in prior years. Since 1851, the population steadily declined, as seen in the graph, only rising again in 1951, after the baby boom after the second world war ended. The population is the lowest it has been recorded. The current population level is 263, which is a density level of 0.3 which is incredibly low compared to towns in the surrounding area, such as Framlingham.

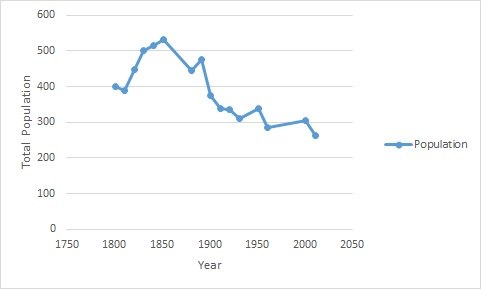
Population of Parham 1801 – 2011

== Religion ==
The primary religion in Parham is the Church of England, with this being the confession of the parish church. As of 2001, 245 people identified as Christian, however, by the 2011 census this had decreased to just 171, there has also been a decline between 2001 and 2011 in those who identify as either other, from 3 to 1, and those who do not state their religion, from 31 down to 19. In contrast, the number identifying as no religion has increased from 28 to 71 between 2011 and 2011.

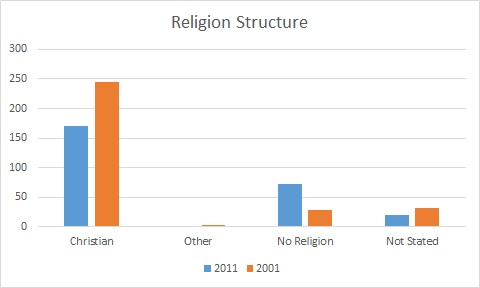
Graph showing populations religion in both 2001 and 2011

== Housing and deprivation ==
The amount of housing in Parham has varied over time, in 1831, the number of houses in the village was just 59, however, 10 years later, in 1841 the amount of housing had increased to 100, this could have been due to industrialisation of the area and people moving to Parham for work. The number of houses in the area stayed at around 100, except for in 1851 when the amount of housing rose to 109, but then falling back down to 100 at the next census date in 1881. In the time from 1891 and 1901, some houses were either knocked down or the parish's boundary lines changed as there were only 96 houses in the village in 1901, dropping from 101 in 1891. This number again rose and fell, during wartime Britain, ranging from a low in 1931 with only 80 houses, and raising back up to 97 in 1961. Using modern census data, from both 2001 and 2011, we can compare the village size with previous years, in the 2001 data we can see that the number of households in the village was 95, with 27 being 1 person households. There were 64 houses that had families in, and 4 houses which were used for "other purposes". In 2011, there were 95 houses in Parham, again with 27 being one person households, there was 62 houses that were owned by families. There were 4 households describes as "other in this census."

In the 2011 census, households were asked to answer questions about deprivation within the household, ranking over 4 dimensions these deprivation dimensions are "Employment, Education, Health and disability, and Household overcrowding.", this deprivation level is low for Parham, with 60 households out of the 106 in the town not being deprived in any dimension. There were 32 households that were deprived in 1 dimension. there were 11 houses that were considered to be deprived in 2 dimensions and 3 households that were deprived in 3 dimensions, and 0 households that were deprived in all 4 of the dimensions.

== Demographics ==
In the 2001 census, the number of people who identified as "White (British)" was 297, of the 303 people who lived in the village. This works out to be 98% of the population that identifies as a white British person. The rest of the town, which was only 6 people, identified as "white (Other)" This changed in the 2011 census, where, of the 263 people who lived in the village at the time, 253 identified as white British, which is a decrease to 96% of the population of Parham. There were 10 people who identified as something other than white British, these was 1 person who identified as Irish, 5 people who identified as other white, 1 who identified as "mixed/multiple ethnic groups, White and Black Caribbean, and 3 who identified as mixed/multiple ethnic groups; White and Asian. this shows that the village is becoming more diverse.

== Notable residents ==
- Ray Hanna (1928–2005), aviator, was resident in the village for several years, and his grave lies in St. Mary's Churchyard.
