= Hacheston =

Village in Suffolk, England

Coordinates: 52.183°N 1.375°E

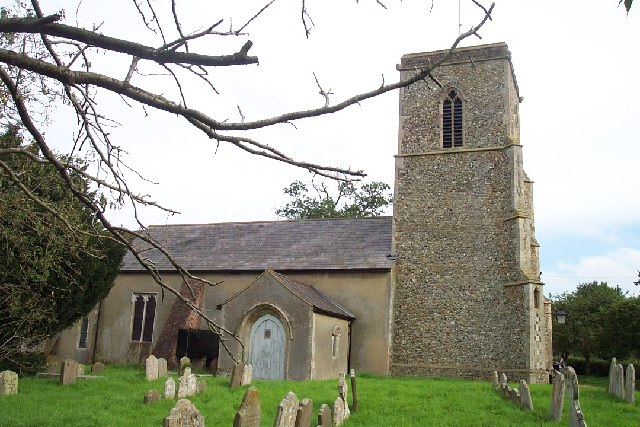
- All Saints Church

- Location within Suffolk
- Area: 7.21 km^{2} (2.78 sq mi)
- Population: 345 (2011)
  - Density: 48/km^{2} (120/sq mi)
- District: East Suffolk
- Shire county: Suffolk
- Region: East
- Country: England
- Sovereign state: United Kingdom
- Post town: Woodbridge
- Postcode district: IP13
- Dialling code: 01728
- Police: Suffolk
- Fire: Suffolk
- Ambulance: East of England
- UK Parliament: Central Suffolk and North Ipswich

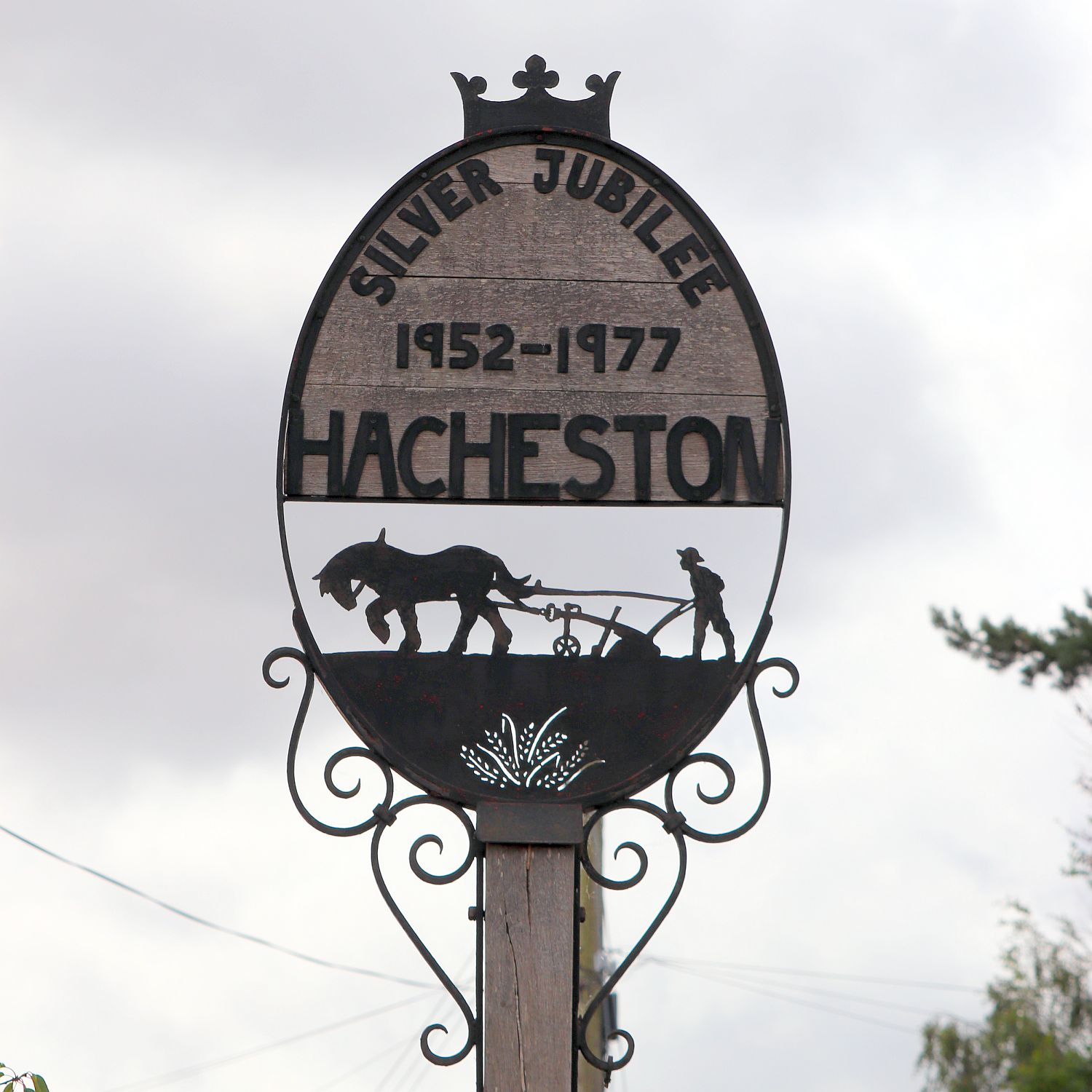
Hacheston Village Sign

Hacheston is a village and civil parish in the East Suffolk district, in the English county of Suffolk. The population of the parish at the 2011 census was 345.

It is located on the B1116 road between the towns of Wickham Market and Framlingham. Hacheston has a church and a village hall. Hacheston Halt railway station was closed in 1952.

Glevering Hall is a historic house and estate within the parish which was built in 1794 by Chaloner Arcedeckne, MP. Glevering Hall became a Grade II* listed building on 25 October 1951.

== Governance ==
An electoral ward in the same name exists. This ward stretches north to Bruisyard with a total population taken at the 2011 Census of 1,977.

== Notable residents ==
- Chaloner Arcedeckne (c. 1743–1809); MP and Jamaican landowner
- Claude Hinscliff (1875–1964); suffragist.
- Chinwe Chukwuogo-Roy MBE (1952-2012); visual artist.

== Related pages ==
- Hacheston Halt railway station
