= Thomas Johnson (scholar) =

English cleric and academic

Thomas Johnson (died 1737) was an English cleric and academic, a moralist writer.

== Life ==
Johnson was a Fellow of Magdalene College, Cambridge (B.A. 1724, M.A. 1728), who was senior university taxor in 1732; and later chaplain at Whitehall Palace. He died in July 1737.

== Works ==
He was one of the four editors of Robert Estienne's Latin Thesaurus, 4 vols. 1734–5; the others were Edmund Law, John Taylor, and Sandys Hutchinson. In 1735 he published an edition of Samuel Pufendorf's De Officio Hominis et Civis, London; other editions, 1737, 1748, 1758. His other writings are:

- An Essay on Moral Obligation: with a view towards settling the Controversy concerning Moral and Positive Duties (anon.), Cambridge, 1731, written in answer to pamphlets by Thomas Chubb and another (anonymous author, The True Foundation of Natural and Reveal'd Religion) that was in fact by Arthur Ashley Sykes.
- The Insufficiency of the Law of Nature, Cambridge, 1731.
- A Letter to Mr. Chandler, in Vindication of a Passage in the Lord Bishop of London's second Pastoral Letter, Cambridge, 1734. To Samuel Chandler.
- Quæstiones Philosophicæ in justi systematis ordinem dispositæ … Ad calcem subjicitur appendix de legibus disputandi, Cambridge, 1734 (other editions, 1735, 1741).

== Notes ==
Attribution

This article incorporates text from a publication now in the public domain: "Johnson, Thomas (fl.1718)". Dictionary of National Biography. London: Smith, Elder & Co. 1885–1900.
