= Ewan Law =

British politician

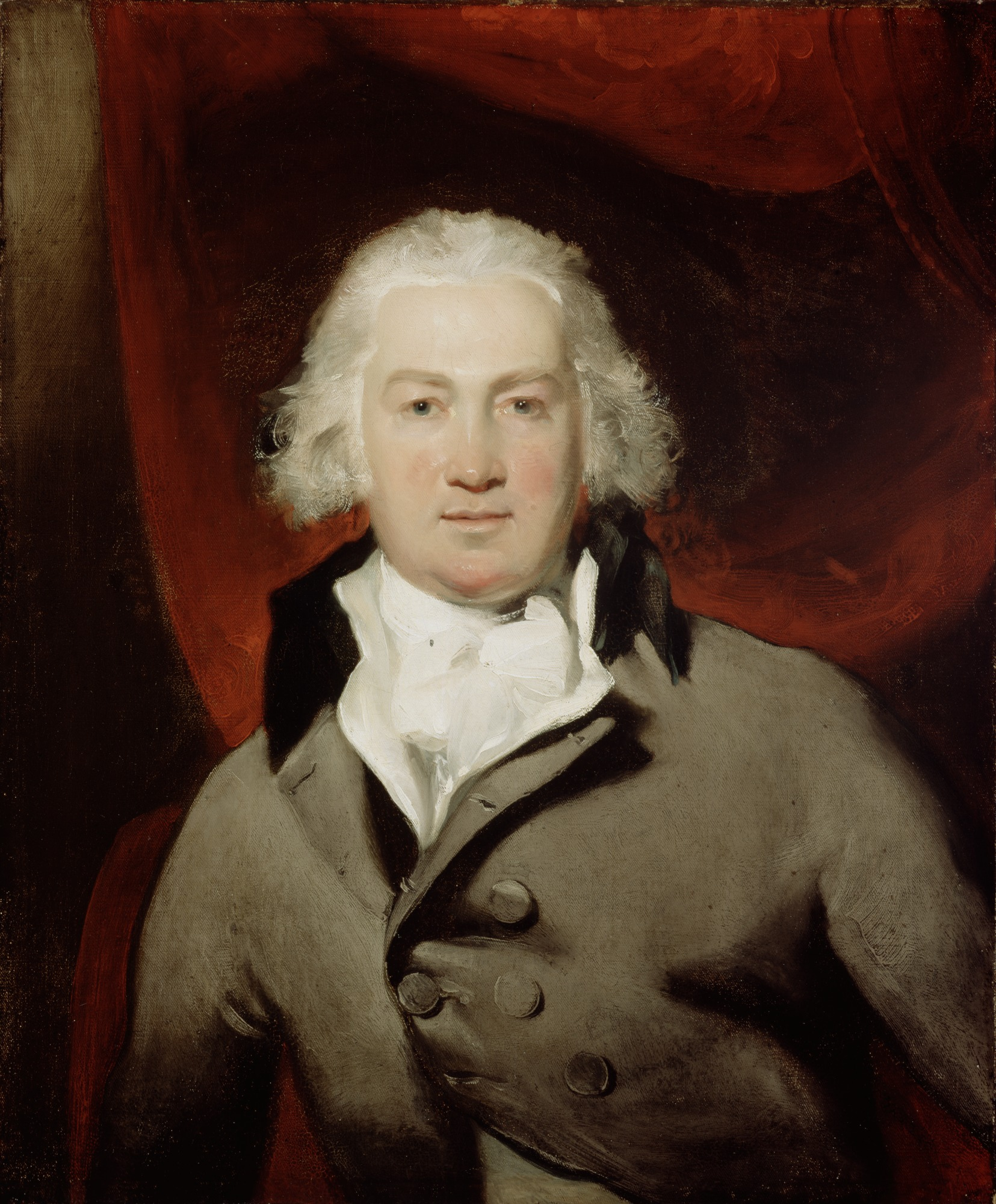
- Ewan Law, M.P. by Thomas Lawrence
- Born: 1747
- Died: 24 April 1829 (aged 81)
- Parent(s): Edmund Law

Ewan Law (1747 – 24 April 1829) was a British politician, MP for Westbury (1795–1800) and Newtown (1802).

== Biography ==
He was baptised on 30 October 1747, the son of Edmund Law, later Bishop of Carlisle.

Entering the East India Company in Bengal in 1763, Law rose through the ranks, joining the council in Patna in 1770, becoming junior merchant in 1772, senior merchant in 1776, and company chief in Patna in 1777. He returned to the UK in 1780, and retired in 1782. He had numerous connections in British India: his brother Thomas Law was an East India Company official; his wife's brother William Markham was Private Secretary to Governor-General Warren Hastings; a sister married Sir Thomas Rumbold, Governor of Madras; his nephew Edward Law, 1st Earl of Ellenborough later became Governor-General.

Elected MP for Westbury in 1790, Law spoke against the Impeachment of Warren Hastings (his brother Edward Law was senior counsel for Hastings' defence), believing Hastings to be "honest and honourable" and condemning the conduct of the trial as "a libel on British justice" on 6 June 1793. He vacated the seat in January 1795.

In 1802 Law's brother Sir Edward Law was appointed Lord Chief Justice and ennobled as Lord Ellenborough, therefore vacating his seat at MP for Newtown. Law succeeded him, elected unopposed in a by-election on 5 May 1802, but there was a delay in his taking his seat, caused by his name being spelled wrongly ("Evan" rather than "Ewan") in the election return. He held the seat until the 1802 general election.

He served on the Commission of Naval Enquiry appointed to investigate malpractice in the navy 1802–05, but he was then in ill health, and could not attend regularly. In 1804 he wrote that attendance was "too much for me", and anticipated keenly that the enquiry would be ended.

He died on 24 April 1829.

== Family ==
Law's brothers were Bishop John Law (1745–1810); Lord Chief Justice Lord Ellenborough (1750–1818); Thomas Law (1756–1834), a property investor in Washington, D.C.; and Bishop George Henry Law (1761–1845).

On 28 June 1784, Law married Henrietta Sarah Markham, daughter of William Markham, Archbishop of York. They had the following children:

- Harriette Law
- Maria Law, married Sir George Clerk Bt MP of Pennycuik
- William John Law, barrister
- Edward Law, clergyman
- Elizabeth Frederica Law, married Rev. Peter Guerin Crofts
- George Ewan Law
- Cecilia Anne Law, married Rev. John Barlow

Parliament of Great Britain
Preceded by Samuel Estwick; John Madocks	Member of Parliament for Westbury; 1790–1795; With: Samuel Estwick	Succeeded by Samuel Estwick; Samuel Estwick II
Parliament of the United Kingdom
Preceded by Sir Edward Law; Charles Shaw Lefevre	Member of Parliament for Newtown (Isle of Wight); 1802; With: Charles Shaw Lefevre	Succeeded by Sir Robert Barclay, Bt; Charles Chapman
