= Framlingham railway station =

Disused railway station in England

Coordinates: 52.2185°N 1.3430°E

Framlingham
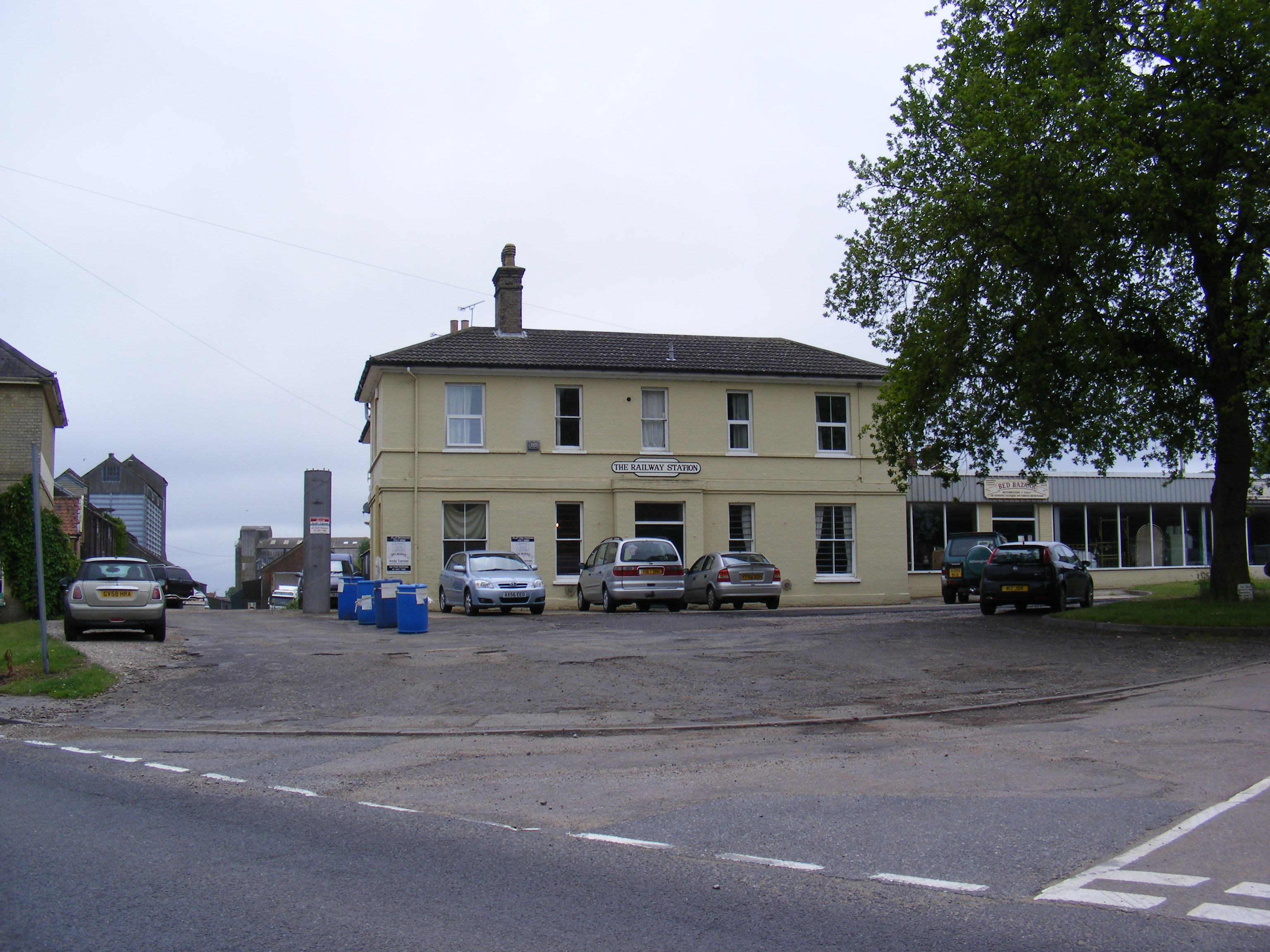
- The former station, now retail space

General information
- Location: Framlingham, East Suffolk; England
- Platforms: 1

Other information
- Status: Disused

History
- Original company: East Suffolk Railway
- Pre-grouping: Great Eastern Railway
- Post-grouping: London and North Eastern Railway; Eastern Region of British Railways

Key dates
- 1 June 1859: Opened
- 3 November 1952: Closed to passengers
- 19 April 1965: Closed
Location

Framlingham railway station was located in Framlingham, Suffolk, England and was the terminus station on the Framlingham Branch.

It opened on 1 June 1859 and closed to passengers in 1952, and to freight in 1965. The first company to operate trains to the station was the Eastern Counties Railway, which had taken over from the East Suffolk Railway Company that built the branch line.

Regular passenger services were withdrawn in November 1952. Subsequently, occasional special passenger trains used the line until the goods train services were withdrawn on 19 April 1965. 1963

The station dealt with significant goods traffic until the 1950s and also had a small single tracked engine shed where the branch engine was kept overnight. This was a sub shed belonging to the Ipswich Locomotive District and on 1 January 1922 GER Class C32 (later LNER F3) 2-4-2T no 1066 was allocated there.

Preceding station	Disused railways	Following station
Terminus	Great Eastern Railway; Framlingham Branch	Parham
