= Thomas Law (1756–1834) =

British colonial administrator (1756–1834)

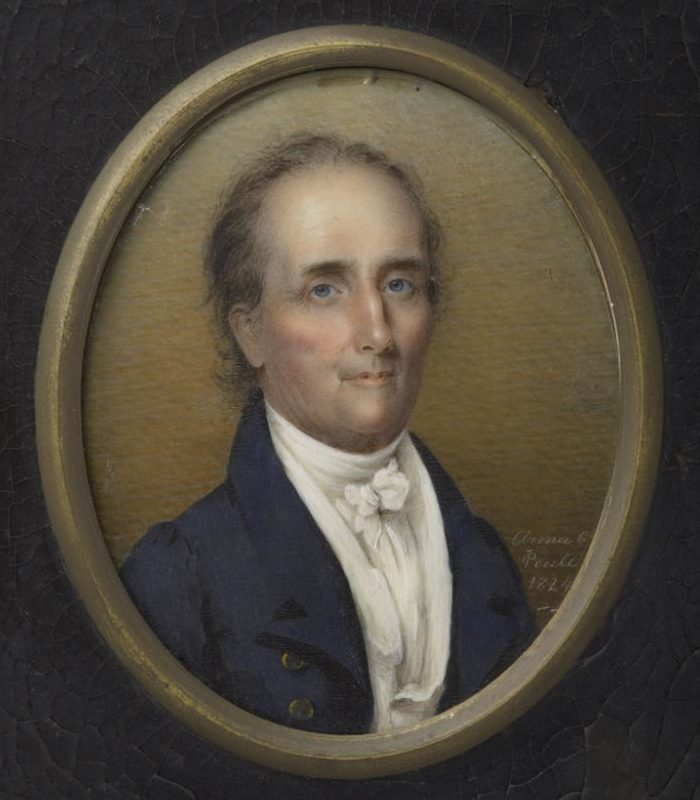
- portrait by Anna Claypoole Peale
- Born: 23 October 1756
- Died: 1834 (aged 77–78)
- Resting place: Rock Creek Cemetery; Washington, D.C., U.S.
- Spouse(s): Elizabeth Parke Custis Law
- Children: Elizabeth Parke Law, Edmund Law
- Parent(s): Edmund Law; Mary Christian
- Relatives: George Henry Law, Edward Law, 1st Baron Ellenborough, John Law, Ewan Law

Thomas Law (October 23, 1756 – 1834), was a British administrator, reformer, and intellectual who significantly influenced British India and the early United States. In India, where he served as collector of revenue for the East India Company. Working with Lord Cornwallis, governor-general of India, Law formulated a major policy known as the Permanent Settlement, which served as the basis for land tenure and taxation policy for natives during subsequent decades of British rule. He returned to England for his health in 1791, taking with him his three illegitimate sons borne of his Indian mistress.

Three years later, Law emigrated to the United States and soon settled in Washington, D.C., then undeveloped but designated as the national capitol. Law became a major real estate investor and developer, as well as a prominent civic leader in the developing new capital after the demise of his fortune. A widely read intellectual, he had grand visions for bringing Enlightenment ideas to bear in reshaping both colonial British India and the early American republic. He eventually brought his sons to the US. The eldest, George, died in 1796. John attended Harvard and Edmund attended Yale. In 1796 Law married 19 year old Elizabeth Parke Custis, the eldest granddaughter of Martha Custis Washington. Before their separation in 1804, they had one daughter, Eliza Custis Law, who married Nicholas Rogers of Baltimore.

== Early life and education ==
Thomas Law was born on October 23, 1756, in Cambridge, England, as the youngest son of a clerical British family. He was raised in the Anglican Church as his father was Edmund Law, Bishop of Carlisle; his brothers were John Law, Bishop of Clonfert and Kilmacduagh in Ireland; Ewan Law MP; Edward Law, 1st Baron Ellenborough, Lord Chief Justice; and George Henry Law, Bishop of Bath and Wells.

== Career in India ==
Thomas Law went to India in the service of the East India Company in 1773, as a "writer" or clerk, the entry-level position. He rose through the Company ranks. He became a revenue collector and judge in the province of Bihar and served as the first collector of Gaya and Rohtas district from 1773 to 1791, which had a population of two million, but resigned the position as judge. As collector, in addition to fiscal duties he had responsibilities that combined a judicial and executive nature of a chief magistrate.

During this period, like many of his countrymen, Law formed a long-term relationship with an Indian woman and had three sons by her. According to East India Company records, his sons George (1784–1796), John (1787?–1822), and Edmund Law (1790–1829) were baptized at St. John's Church in Calcutta.

Also like many ranking EIC officials, Law made a small fortune in trading in the course of his career. Unlike many of his colleagues, however, Law was also something of an intellectual. As a policy-maker he helped devise the so-called "Permanent Settlement", which transformed the basis of taxation and land tenure for the natives of India, while attempting to establish a secure revenue base for the company. It was so successful that the Board adopted it across the country. When Law returned to England in 1791 because of declining health, he had £50,000. (Accounts of this vary; other sources say £100,000 or higher.)

He had placed bonds with a bank in Calcutta to provide support of his Indian consort. He brought his three Anglo-Indian, mixed-race "natural" sons with him in order to provide them with education. Once returned, Law encountered some personal and professional setbacks, getting into disagreements with company superiors and having difficulties because of the East India Company refused to pay him money that was owed. He also fell out of favor because of his opposition to the projected war with France.

== Emigration to the United States ==
Law decided to leave England and go to the United States. In 1794, he emigrated to the United States, taking his eldest sons, George and John, with him He left his youngest son Edmund, then four, with an aunt for a few years until he got settled and the boy was older. Law first went to New York, where he met James Greenleaf who told him of speculative and development opportunities in Washington, DC, which had been designated as the national capital in 1790. Law invested large portions of his fortune in buying land there and helping develop the new capital. There was much speculation in real estate. He invested in property with the Greenleaf Syndicate, which went bankrupt in 1797.

Law continued to care for his sons and arranged for their education. Following a trip to England about 1802–1803, he returned to the United States with Edmund. John attended Harvard College (Class of 1804) and Edmund attended Yale College (Class of 1806).

== Personal life ==
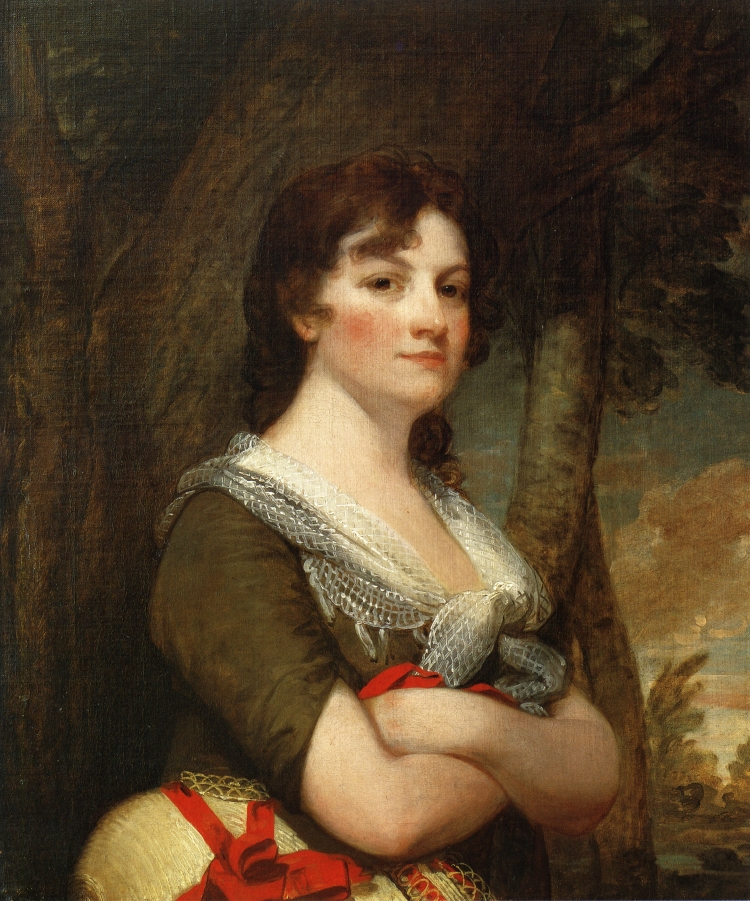
Elizabeth Parke Custis, portrait by Gilbert Stuart

On March 20, 1796, Law married 19 year old Elizabeth Parke Custis (d. 1831), the eldest granddaughter of Martha Washington and step-granddaughter of George Washington. The marriage occurred at Hope Park, the home of her stepfather Dr. David Stuart. Soon after their marriage, Law and Elizabeth moved temporarily into a new house built on 6th Street SW as part of development in that area. The Federal-style house became known as "Honeymoon House"; the Laws lived there from about March through August 1796. They next moved to the house they had built for them.

Due to differences, Law and his wife separated in 1804, and they were divorced on 18 January 1811. The couple had one daughter who survived infancy, Elizabeth Law (1797–1822). She married Nicholas Lloyd Rogers (known as Lloyd N. Rogers) of Druid Hill, Baltimore in 1817.

When Law and his wife, known as Eliza P. C. Law, separated, he made a deed of certain real estate as jointure, to provide an annuity to her during her life of $1,500, for her own separate use and benefit. At her death, the said real estate was to be reconveyed to Thomas Law and his heirs, clear of encumbrances by the annuity administrators. Eliza P. C. Law acquired a residence in Alexandria, Virginia (part of Washington D.C. until 1846), and continued active in Washington, DC society.

Their daughter Elizabeth Law (1797–1822) had three children with her husband Lloyd N. Rogers: Edmund Law (1816–1865), Eliza, and Eleanor Rogers. Elizabeth Law Rogers was survived by her husband and children, and both her parents, who at her death had been divorced for more than a decade.

Following the end of his sole recognized marriage, Law had another relationship with a woman of color, Mary E. Robinson, who bore the only son who would survive Law, Joseph E. Law, who would become involved in the litigation involving his father's shrunken finances after the death of his ex-wife Eliza P.C. Law, as discussed below.

== Career in Washington, DC ==
Law built several buildings in DC, including a hotel and other properties along New Jersey Avenue, SE, and invested in others. He bought land down to Buzzard's Point, an area along the East Branch of the Potomac, and established some commercial businesses there, including a sugar mill. Because of his commercial background, he thought that area along the waterfront and canal in which he invested would rapidly develop. But early development in the city was concentrated around the White House and Capitol, the center of its political life, and the Greenleaf syndicate's failure would also deeply affect his finances, and cause litigation. Over time, Law assumed a prominent role in the city's social, political, and economic life, becoming known as an energetic, if somewhat eccentric, promoter of his adopted country. He published poetry, and moral philosophy. He helped found the first theater in the nation's capital, a dancing society, and a learned society called the Columbian Institute for the Promotion of Arts and Sciences.

Following the War of 1812, in which Washington was occupied and partially burnt by British forces in 1814, Law led an effort to retain the national capital there. He directed construction of a temporary Capitol, so Congress would have a place to meet, and to thwart some who proposed moving the national capital elsewhere. Law continued to invest in real estate holdings in the Southwest and Southeast parts of the city. His son John Law served on the American side in the War of 1812; he had become a lawyer. John Law also served as a local legislator. Both sons became involved in business affairs with their father. John Law also went out to the Illinois Territory to work for a period, scouting for land and development opportunities.

The senior Law also worked tirelessly to gather support to build a canal through the city to facilitate trade. Under the pseudonym "Homo" in the 'National Intelligencer', Law advocated the creation of a national paper currency, publicly financed debt and an agricultural society, all to improve the country's economic development. More publicly, he helped found the Columbian Institute (which Congress chartered in 1818 and which closed in 1838, but whose collection later passed to the Smithsonian Institution), and funded many arts endeavors. He invested more in the national capital through thirty years than did the federal government, which a later historian found both remarkable and depressing. In 1817 Law bought a plantation, known as the Retreat or Tusculum, in Prince George's County, Maryland, from which he could see the East Branch of the Potomac and the city. He was elected as president of the county agricultural society. While he did use it as a retreat, he also entertained large parties, reportedly including President Monroe and top-ranking officials.

Privately, Law supported the abolition of slavery, as well as the colonization of free blacks outside the bounds of the United States. Law also manumitted Ann (Nancy) Dandridge Costin and her children in exchange for small sums of money. Law's wife Eliza Custis had inherited Nancy, who was thought to be Martha Washington's half-sister, and who married a slave named Costin, then had four daughters before that relationship ended and she had another two children by a man named Holmes. Her son William Costin would become important as a free Black in the new federal city, and successfully challenge an early Black Code. Law also emancipated William's wife and children. The American Colonization Society was active in this period in supporting relocation of free blacks to the colony of Liberia (originally separate settlements were established by state colonization societies, including one in Maryland). Law had invested most of his fortune in property in Washington, DC, at a time of speculation as the capital was being moved to this new city. He bought some property from the Greenleaf Syndicate, which at one time owned one-third of the saleable property, and went bankrupt in 1797. Law was repeatedly on the verge of bankruptcy. Property values fell, for instance, after the 1814 burning of Washington.

== Estate litigation ==
In 1832, two years before his death, and having survived his ex-wife and both legitimate and all but one of his illegitimate children, Thomas Law executed a will, in which he bequeathed $5,000 (~$172,363 in 2024) each to his grandsons Thomas Law and Edmund Law, the sons of the late John Law, Esq., his natural son, of Washington, DC. (Townsend said he bequeathed them $5,000 in Illinois lands to be available when they came of age.) James Adams was the executor of his will. He also bequeathed $1000 to Joseph Edmund Law, the illegitimate son of Edmund law with Mary Robinson and $1000 to Thomas Law, an illegitimate child the elder Thomas Law had later in life with his enslaved servant, Margaret Jones.

By a codicil to his will, Thomas Law also bequeathed $5,000 to his legitimate grandchildren, Edmund, Eliza, and Eleanor Rogers, with a provision that the will should be null and of no effect if they should set up a claim under the marriage settlement he had made with Elizabeth P. C. Law.

In late December 1832 Lloyd N. Rogers (as he was known) had gained appointment as administrator for the estate of his mother-in-law Eliza P. C. Law, who died December 31, 1831, on behalf of her grandchildren, her only survivors. He sued Thomas Law for payment of annuity and interest in arrears since 1804 on her marriage settlement.

In 1838, Joseph E. Law (illegitimate son of Edmund Law), represented by his mother Mary Robinson (as "next friend" in court) filed suit to receive his $1000 bequest and pay him interest. He amended the suit seeking to have as parties Edmund and Thomas Law, and Edmund, Eliza, and Eleanor Rogers, and other heirs of Eliza P. Custis Law.

The case went to the Circuit Court, which ruled that the Rogers children (grandchildren of Thomas Law) had a claim on the property he had identified as jointure in his 1804 settlement with Elizabeth P. C. Law, as did Lloyd N. Rogers for arrears of annuity and interest as administrator of Eliza P. C. Law's estate until her death. The court ordered the will to be executed and an auditor was assigned, reporting from 1848 to 1852. The trustee of the jointure and executor of the estate (Adams) appealed.

The US Supreme Court finally decided the case in Adams v. Law (1854). Ruling only on the grandchildren's claim, the justices found that the Rogers grandchildren had no "take" on the property that was subject to jointure, which Law had assigned by trust to Elizabeth P. C. Law in her lifetime via the settlement he made when they separated.

By then, this property had appreciated substantially in value, making his estate one of the most valuable in DC. Only the Rogers children and Joseph E. Law survived to see their inheritance.

== Death and legacy ==
By the time of his death in 1834, Law had earned the support and friendship of such important national figures as presidents Thomas Jefferson and John Quincy Adams (both of whom he outlived) and diverse figures as John C. Calhoun, Henry Clay, many ordinary citizens. However, he had outlived most of his family, as well as his fortune, and would be buried in an unmarked grave in Rock Creek Cemetery.

One historian considers Law's life and career as a concrete link between Britain's Second Empire in India and its First Empire in North America.

The Maryland Historical Society maintains the Thomas Law Family Papers (1791–1834), including some of his sons Edmund and John.

The Thomas Law House in Washington, D.C. survived significant redevelopment in the area in the late 20th century, and has been listed on the National Register of Historic Places since 1973 as one of the earliest Federal-style houses built in Washington, DC. It became a rental property after Law and his wife lived there and was used as a hotel by the 1860s. In the 1960s it became a community center for a related apartment development.
