= Glevering Hall =

House in Hacheston, Suffolk, England

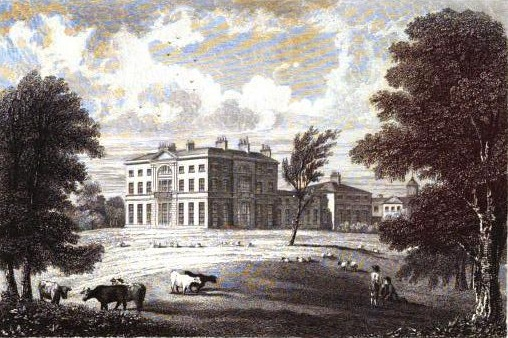
- Glevering Hall, c.1824

- Location within Suffolk

General information
- Location: Hacheston, Suffolk, England
- Coordinates: 52.1685°N 1.3593°E
- Construction started: 1786
- Completed: 1794

Design and construction
- Architect: John White the Elder

Glevering Hall is a historic house and estate approximately 1 mile (1.6 km) northwest of Wickham Market, in the parish of Hacheston, Suffolk, England. It was possessed at one time by the Abbey of Leiston. The present house was built in 1794 by Chaloner Arcedeckne, MP. Glevering Hall became a Grade II* listed building on 25 October 1951.

== History ==
The manor of Glevering, or Glavering, appears to have been a hamlet to Hacheston. In the time of William the Conqueror, it was in the possession of Herveus Bituricensis, though William de Malet also had an estate at Glevering. Before 1313 Gilbert de Peche gave it to Leiston Abbey, in Suffolk, and it remained in the abbey's possession until the dissolution of the monasteries. Henry VIII granted the estate to Charles Brandon, Duke of Suffolk. From his heirs, it became the dower of Anne of Cleves. After Thomas Seckford obtained it through a grant in fee, he sold it in 1564 to John Bull of Brodshaw Hall, in Sproughton; it continued in this family for several generations. The manor belonged to Framlingham Castle until it was sold by Theophilus Howard (d. 1640), Earl of Suffolk. In 1682, C. Radcliffe (or Radclyffe) was lord of the manor; after his death, it passed to his widow, Mary, and then to their son, Hugh. In 1744, Thomas Whimper, was lord; in 1777, it was John Whimper, of Alderton.

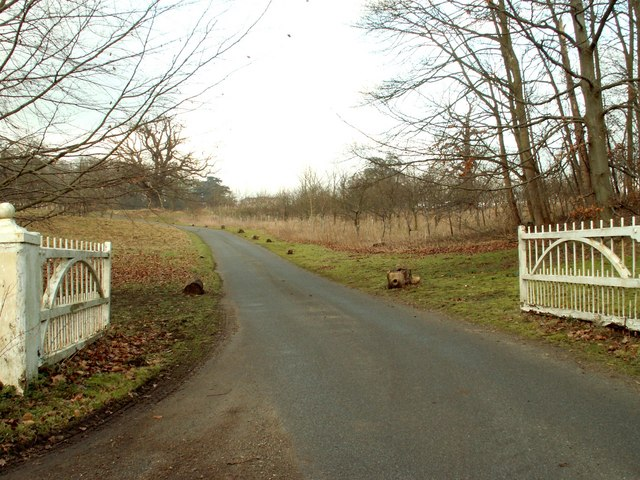
Driveway to Glevering Hall

The estate was purchased ca. 1791 by Chaloner Arcedeckne (d. 1809) who built the present mansion in 1794 to a design of John White the Elder. Archdeckne was appointed High Sheriff of Suffolk for 1797. His son, Andrew Arcedeckne, also High Sheriff of Suffolk (for 1812–13), resided here through the 1850s. He expanded the building in 1834–5 to a design of Decimus Burton. The house was purchased in 1935 by the Hurlock family and remains as a private house. The stable block to the north of the house has been converted into individual mews houses and apartments and let out (www.gleveringhall.com).

== Architecture and fittings ==
The present house, of Georgian style, is three-storied with grey stucco. Its entrance, originally on the south side, was moved to the west front and features two 5-panel doors, framed by stucco pilasters dating to 1899. Interior features include a stone staircase, a wrought iron balustrade, and Adam style stucco. The home contains at least three different panelling elements: some of the wall panels are painted, there is a panelled dado, and some of the panelled mahogany doors include inlay. The dining room, a drawing room, and a library are each approximately 26 feet (7.9 m) by 20 feet (6.1 m) in size.

== Grounds ==
Part of the old hall, south of the present mansion, is near the kitchen garden. The grounds also include offices, stables, coach houses, and the Vanneck Mews dwelling, which became a Grade II listed building on 25 October 1951. In 1816, several Roman urns were unearthed by workers while enclosing one of the estate's plantations.
