= George Henry Law =

British bishop (1761–1845)

The Right Reverend George Henry Law FRS FSA
- Bishop of Bath and Wells
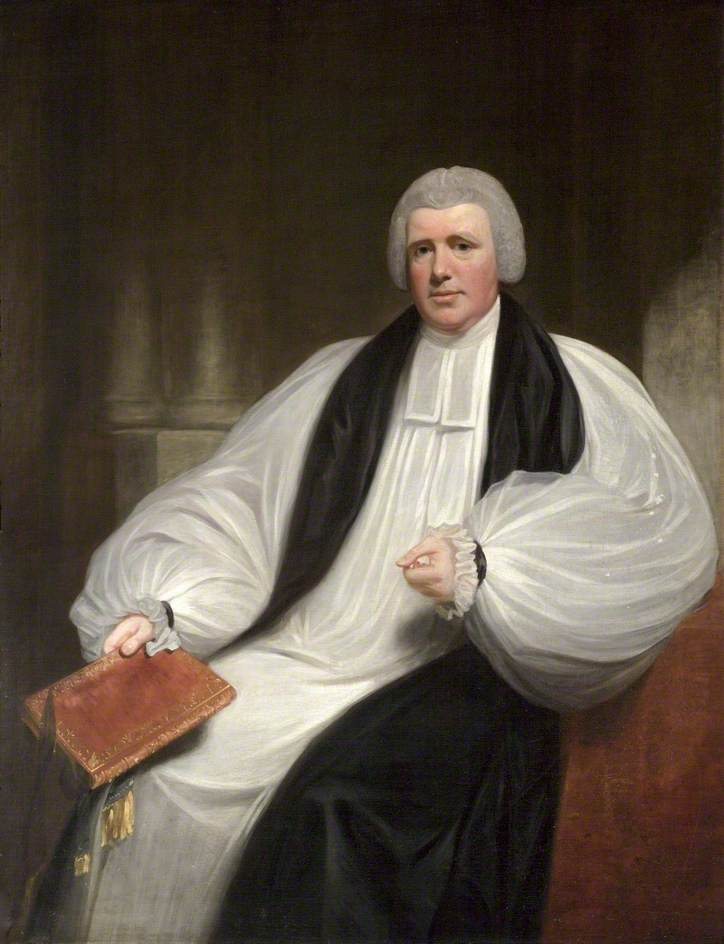
- Bishop Law by William Beechey
- Church: Church of England
- Diocese: Bath and Wells
- Elected: 1824
- Term ended: 1845 (death)
- Predecessor: Richard Beadon
- Successor: Richard Bagot
- Other post: Bishop of Chester (1812–1824)

Personal details
- Born: 12 September 1761 Peterhouse, Cambridge, England
- Died: 22 September 1845 (aged 84) Banwell Caves, Somerset, England
- Buried: Wells Cathedral
- Denomination: Anglican
- Parents: Edmund Law (Bishop of Carlisle)
- Spouse: Jane Adeane (m. 1784)
- Education: Charterhouse School
- Alma mater: Queens' College, Cambridge

Arms of George Law, Bishop: Argent, on a bend between two cocks gules three mullets of the field

George Henry Law FRS FSA (12 September 1761 – 22 September 1845) was the Bishop of Chester (1812) and then, from 1824, Bishop of Bath and Wells.

Born at the lodge of Peterhouse, Cambridge, of which his father Edmund Law (who later became Bishop of Carlisle) was Master, Law was educated at Charterhouse School and at Queens' College, Cambridge, where he was second wrangler. His main claim to fame was the way in which he introduced a systematic and rigorous training system for parish priests.

He founded a theological college at St Bees in Cumbria. There had been once been a monastery at St Bees, but since the dissolution in 1539 many of the monastic buildings had disappeared and chancel stood roofless when Bishop Law visited Whitehaven in 1816. He was short of good clergy for the diocese, which included Lancashire, and was at that time the powerhouse of the industrial revolution. The consequent growth in population increased the demand for clergymen. Up until Bishop Law's college, training for clergy was haphazard. Most were ordained on the strength of a degree from Oxford or Cambridge, whilst some were ordained after individual instruction from a member of the clergy. Resulting clergy were variable and did not meet a reliable standard. Law was determined to improve the supply situation so when Law visited Whitehaven and met the influential Lowther family and they agreed to pay for restoration of the chancel for a new theogical college he accepted the offer. The agreement allowed Law to appoint the new vicar for St Bees and Principal of the College, contrary to the practice of patronage at the time, and so the St Bees Theological College was born. It was the first theological training institution of the Anglican Church outside Oxford or Cambridge.

The Lowthers did not act out of pure generosity. They were keen to improve their public image having been accused of acquiring the mineral rights to Whitehaven for a pittance from St Bees School, and were also suspected of having tried to keep the matter quiet by arranging the sacking of the headmaster.

== Family ==
Law was the younger brother of Bishop John Law (1745–1810), Ewan Law MP (1747–1829), Lord Chief Justice Lord Ellenborough (1750–1818), and Thomas Law (1756–1834), a property investor in Washington, D.C.

On 13 July 1784, Law married Jane Adeane, daughter of General James Whorwood Adeane MP. They had the following children:

- Anna Law (1786–1832)
- Joanna Law (1787–1848), married Alexander Powell MP
- Augusta Law (1789–1822), married Rev. James Slade
- James Thomas Law (1790–1876), chancellor of the Diocese of Lichfield
- George Law (1794–1811)
- Henry Law (1797–1884), Dean of Gloucester
- Robert Vanbrugh Law (1799–1884), clergyman
- Jane Waugh Law (1801–1843), married Rev. Robert Harkness
- Margaret Law (1803–1838)

Church of England titles
Preceded by Bowyer Sparke	Bishop of Chester; 1812–1824	Succeeded by Charles James Blomfield
Preceded by Richard Beadon	Bishop of Bath and Wells; 1824–1845	Succeeded by Richard Bagot
