= Parham railway station =

Disused railway station in England

Coordinates: 52.1958°N 1.3751°E

Parham

General information
- Location: Parham, East Suffolk; England
- Platforms: 1

Other information
- Status: Disused

History
- Pre-grouping: Great Eastern Railway
- Post-grouping: London and North Eastern Railway; Eastern Region of British Railways

Key dates
- 1 Jun 1859: Station opens
- 3 Nov 1952: Station closes for passengers
- 13 July 1964: closed for freight
Location

Parham railway station was a station located in Parham, Suffolk.

The station opened in 1859 and closed for passenger services in November 1952.

Preceding station	Disused railways	Following station
Framlingham	Framlingham Branch	Hacheston
