= Marlesford railway station =

Disused railway station in England

Coordinates: 52.1683°N 1.4011°E

Marlesford
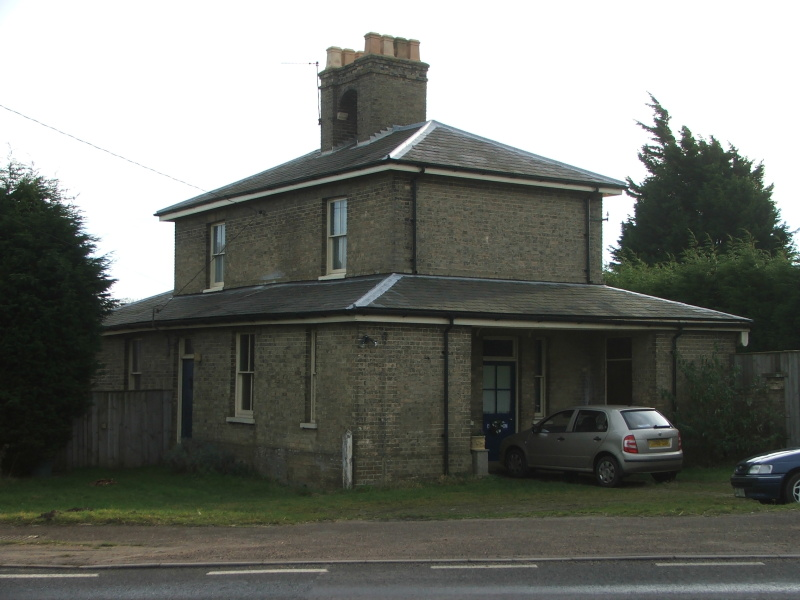
- Marlesford station buildings in December 2008.

General information
- Location: Marlesford, East Suffolk; England
- Platforms: 1

Other information
- Status: Disused

History
- Pre-grouping: Great Eastern Railway
- Post-grouping: London and North Eastern Railway; Eastern Region of British Railways

Key dates
- 1 June 1859: Opened
- 3 Nov 1952: Closed for passengers
- 13 July 1964: Closed for freight
Location

Marlesford railway station was a station located in Marlesford, Suffolk. It closed in 1952.

The station was served by trains that operated between Framlingham and Wickham Market until withdrawal of passenger services in November 1952.

As of 2020, the station building still exists and is clearly visible from the A12.

Preceding station	Disused railways	Following station
Hacheston Halt	Framlingham Branch	Wickham Market
