= Mark Schreiber, Baron Marlesford =

British Conservative politician (1931–2025)

The Right Honourable The Lord Marlesford DL
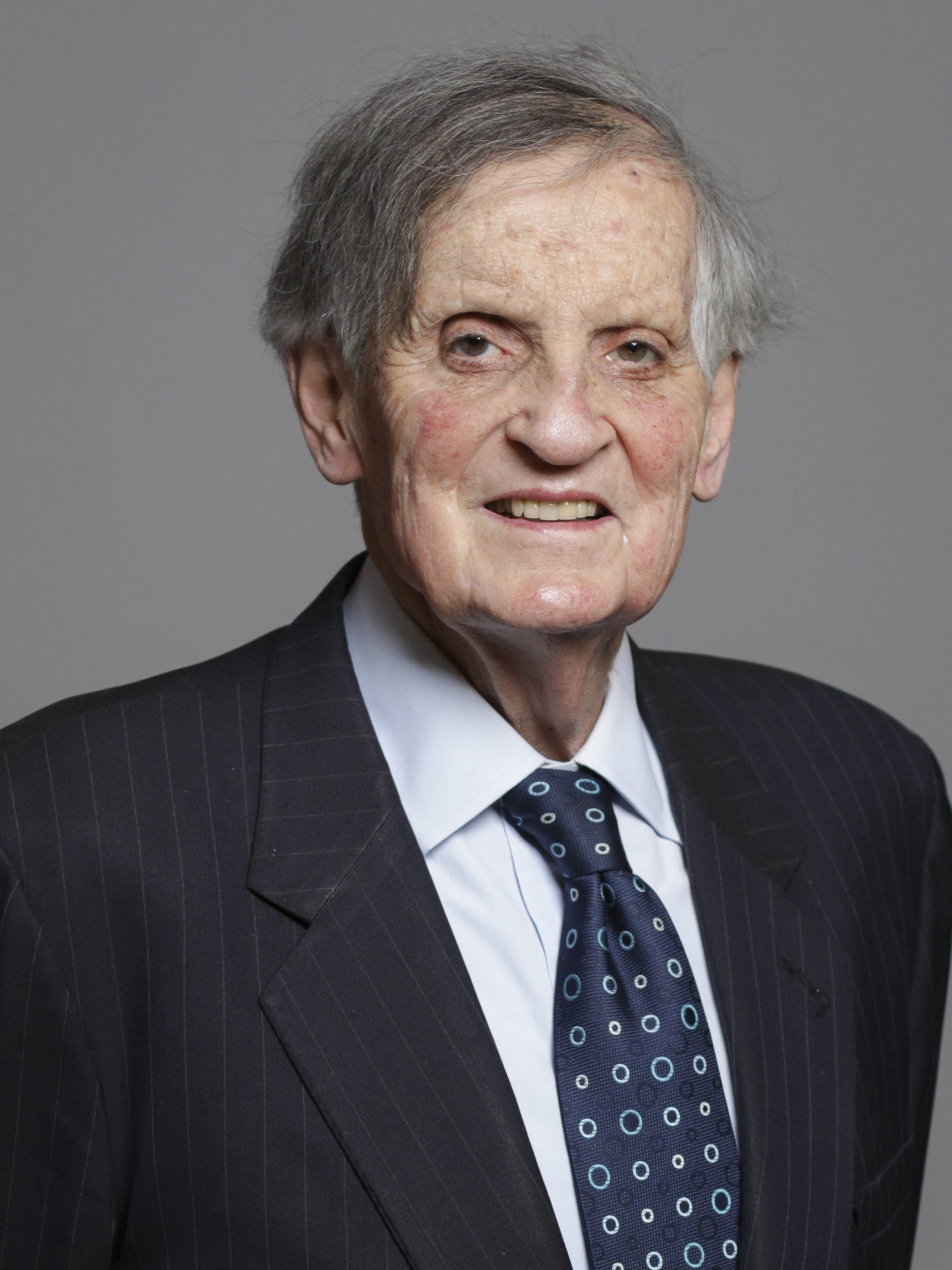
- Official portrait, 2020

Member of the House of Lords
- Lord Temporal
- Life peerage 7 June 1991 – 13 July 2025

Personal details
- Born: Mark Shuldham Schreiber; 11 September 1931
- Died: 13 July 2025 (aged 93)
- Party: Conservative
- Spouse: Gabriella Veglio di Castelletto d'Uzzone (m. 1969)
- Children: 2
- Education: Sandroyd School; Eton College; Trinity College, Cambridge

Mark Shuldham Schreiber, Baron Marlesford (11 September 1931 – 13 July 2025) was a British Conservative politician.

== Early life and education ==
Schreiber was born on 11 September 1931 to Wing Commander John Shuldham Schreiber DL (1901−1968), of Marlesford Hall in Marlesford, Suffolk, and Constance Maureen, daughter of Charles Hastings Dent, of Maltravers House, Arundel, Sussex. His father was appointed High Sheriff of Suffolk in 1963. The Schreibers had emigrated to England from Durlach, near Karlsruhe in Germany, in the 1700s, settling in Hertfordshire. Schreiber's paternal grandmother, Margaret Henderson, was the daughter of Alexander Henderson, 1st Baron Faringdon, and he also claimed to be related to the Greek politician Ioannis Kapodistrias.

He was educated at Sandroyd School, then, like his father, at Eton College and Trinity College, Cambridge, where his studies were interrupted by national service in the Coldstream Guards, in which he served as a lieutenant.

== Career ==
Schreiber worked for Fisons, an Ipswich-based fertiliser company, from 1957 to 1963 before joining the Conservative Research Department as an adviser to Edward Heath, then Leader of the Opposition. He accompanied Ernest Marples to America and Japan to conduct research on computers, and also visited America with David Howell to look at budgeting systems.

From 1968 to 1970 Schreiber was a councillor on East Suffolk County Council, and from 1970 to 1974 was a special adviser to the Government, working mainly for Lord Rothschild, head of the Central Policy Review Staff. From 1974 to 1991 he was the parliamentary lobby correspondent for The Economist.

He served on the Countryside Commission from 1980 to 1992 and the Rural Development Commission from 1985 to 1993 and was appointed Deputy Lieutenant of Suffolk in 1991. He chaired the Council for the Preservation of Rural England from 1993 to 1998 and was president of the Suffolk Preservation Society from 1998, as well as chair of Marlesford parish council.

== House of Lords ==
Schreiber was created a life peer on 7 June 1991 as Baron Marlesford, of Marlesford in the County of Suffolk.

He served on the Financial Affairs Sub-Committee from 2000 to 2005 and after 2010, and the Home Affairs Sub-Committee from 2005 to 2009.

== Other roles ==
Schreiber served as a director of the Eastern Group plc (1989–1995), Times Newspapers Holdings (from 1991) and Baring New Russia Fund (1997–2007). He was also an adviser to Mitsubishi Corporation International NV (1990–2003) and to John Swire & Sons (1992–2009).

== Personal life and death ==
In 1969 Schreiber married Gabriella Veglio di Castelletto d'Uzzone, daughter of Count Veglio di Castelletto d'Uzzone of Johannesburg. They had two daughters.

Schreiber died on 13 July 2025, at the age of 93.

Coat of arms of Mark Schreiber, Baron Marlesford
Crest A Dexter Arm in Armour the upper arm charged with a Roundel Sable thereon a Cross engrailed Or grasping a Dagger point downwards proper Hilt and pomel Or Escutcheon Ermine on a Roundel Sable between three Griffins' Heads erased Vert a Cross engrailed Or Supporters On either side a Griffin Ermine the Aquiline Parts Vert Forelegs Or collared with a Ring of Clouds radiated proper and segreant on a Grassy Mount also proper Motto (Above the Crest:) Post Nubila Phoebus (After the clouds the sun); (Below the Shield) Deutlich und Wahr (Faithful and true)

== Sources ==
- "Lords: alphabetical list of Members". Archived from the original on 23 April 2010.
- Mr Mark Schreiber
- "Lord Marlesford". Archived from the original on 10 May 2008.
- "Marlesford". www.ukwhoswho.com.
- "Peer blasts £500,000 bat bridges proposal". Archived from the original on 29 October 2011.
