= Edmund Law =

British bishop (1703–1787)

The Right Reverend Edmund Law
- Bishop of Carlisle
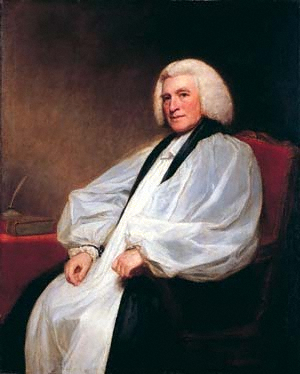
- Edmund Law, by George Romney, 1781
- Church: Church of England
- See: Carlisle
- In office: 1768–1787
- Predecessor: Charles Lyttelton
- Successor: John Douglas

Personal details
- Born: 6 June 1703 Cartmel, Lancashire, England
- Died: 14 August 1787 (aged 84) Dalston, Cumberland, England

Arms of Edmund Law, Bishop of Carlisle: Argent, on a bend between two cocks gules three mullets of the field

Edmund Law (6 June 1703 – 14 August 1787) was a churchman in the Church of England. He served as Master of Peterhouse, Cambridge, as Knightbridge Professor of Philosophy in the University of Cambridge from 1764 to 1769, and as bishop of Carlisle from 1768 to 1787.

== Life ==
Edmund Law was born in the parish of Cartmel, Grange-over-Sands, Lancashire on 6 June 1703, son of Edmund Law, curate of Staveley-in-Cartmel and master of a small school there from 1693 to 1742, and Patience, daughter of Christopher Langbaine, of Kendal, Westmoreland. Per Law's friend and biographer William Paley, the Laws descended from a family of yeomen long settled at Askham in Westmoreland. The senior Edmund Law seems on his marriage to have settled on his wife's property at Buck Crag, about four miles from Staveley. There his only son, Edmund, the future bishop, was born. The boy, educated first at Cartmel school, and afterwards at the free grammar school at Kendal, went to St. John's College, Cambridge. He earned his B.A. in 1723. Soon elected fellow of Christ's College, he proceeded M.A. in 1727. At Cambridge his chief friends were Daniel Waterland, master of Magdalene College, John Jortin, and John Taylor, the editor of Demosthenes.

In 1737, Law was presented with the living of Greystoke in Cumberland, the gift of which at this time devolved on the university, and soon afterwards he married Mary, daughter of John Christian, of Ewanrigg, Cumberland. Her mother Bridget was daughter of John (a.k.a. Humphrey) Senhouse, of a Cumberland landed gentry family with descent from King Edward I. In 1743, he was made archdeacon of Carlisle, and in 1746 he left Greystoke for Great Salkeld, the rectory of which was annexed to the archdeaconry.

Law became Master of Peterhouse on 12 November 1754, and at the same time resigned his archdeaconry. In 1760, Law was appointed librarian, or rather proto-bibliothecarius, of the university of Cambridge, an office created in 1721, and first filled by Dr. Conyers Middleton, and in 1764 he was made Knightbridge professor of moral philosophy. In 1763, he was presented to the archdeaconry of Staffordshire and a prebend in Lichfield Cathedral by his former pupil, Frederick Cornwallis; he received a prebend in Lincoln Cathedral in 1764, and in 1767, a prebendal stall in Durham Cathedral through the influence of the Duke of Newcastle.

== Bishop of Carlisle ==
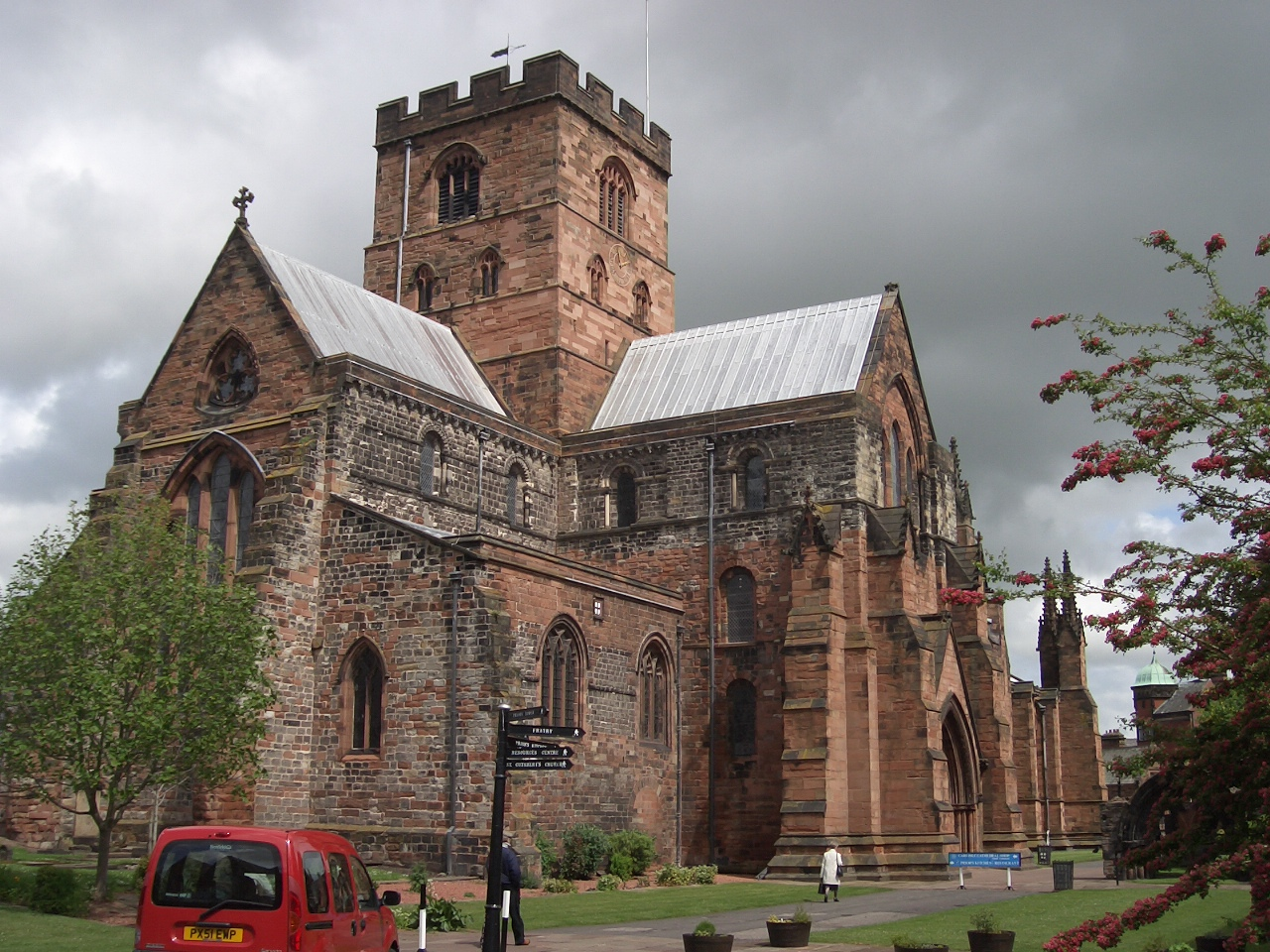
Law was buried in Carlisle cathedral

In 1768, Law was recommended by the Duke of Grafton, then chancellor of the university, to the bishopric of Carlisle. His friend and biographer William Paley declares that Law regarded his elevation as a satisfactory proof that decent freedom of inquiry was not discouraged.

== Death and legacy ==
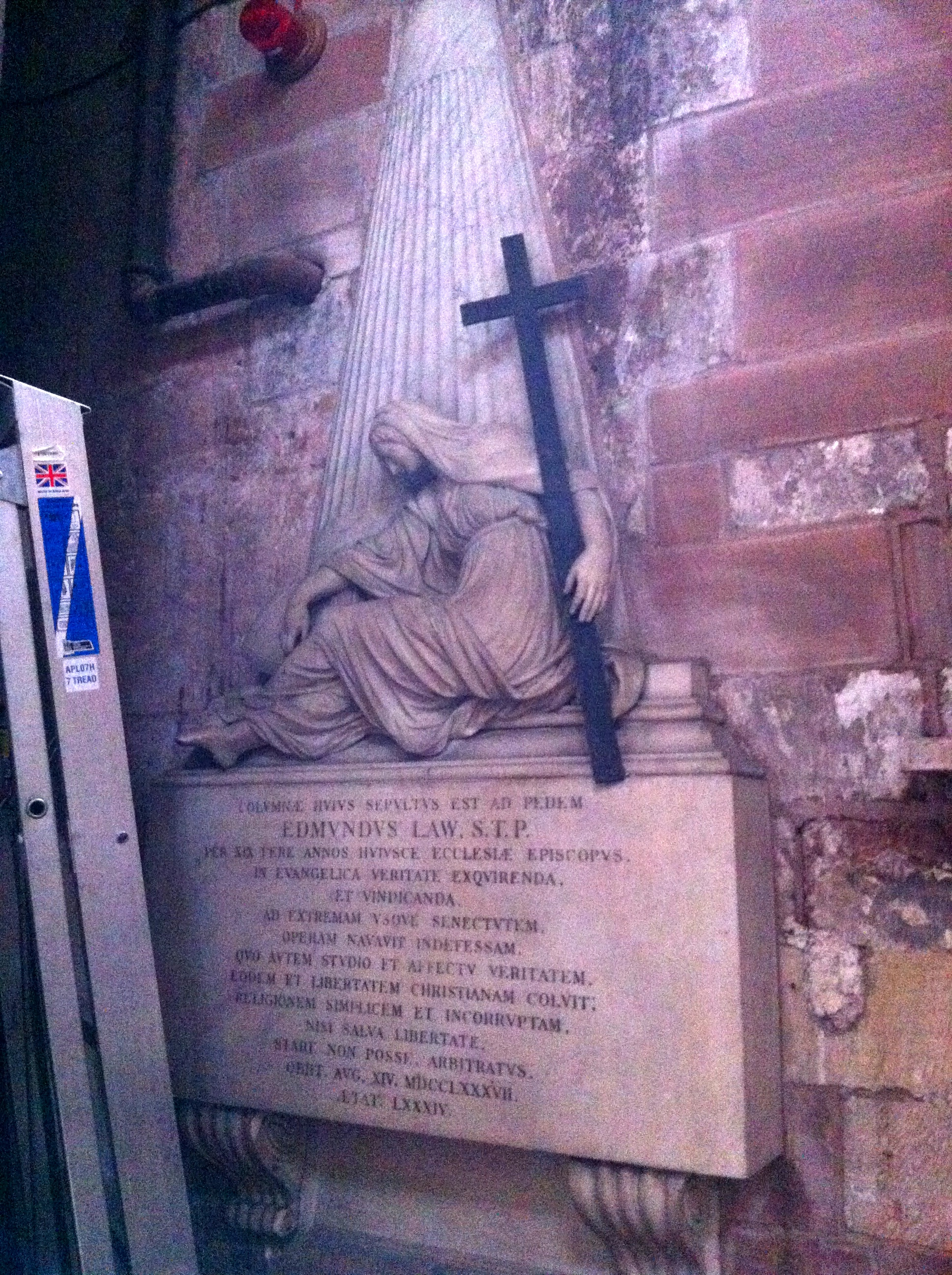
Memorial in Carlisle Cathedral by Thomas Banks

Law died at Rose Castle, in Dalston, Cumbria on 14 August 1787, in his eighty-fifth year. He was buried in Carlisle Cathedral, where the inscription on his monument commemorates his zeal alike for Christian truth and Christian liberty, adding "religionem simplicem et incorruptam nisi salva libertate stare non-posse arbitratus." His biographer, who knew him well, describes the bishop as "a man of great softnesse of manners, and of the mildest and most tranquil disposition. His voice was never raised above its ordinary pitch. His countenance seemed never to have been ruffled."

Law's wife predeceased him in 1772, leaving eight sons- including John Law (1745–1810), Bishop of Elphin, Ewan Law (1747–1829), MP for Westbury (1795–1800) and Newtown (1802), Edward Law, 1st Baron Ellenborough (1750–1818), Lord Chief Justice, Thomas Law (1756–1834), investor in Washington, D.C., and George Henry Law (1761–1845), Bishop of Chester and Bishop of Bath and Wells- and four daughters, the youngest of whom, Joanna, married Sir Thomas Rumbold, Governor of Madras.

The bishop's portrait was three times painted by Romney: in 1777 for Sir Thomas Rumbolt; in 1783 for Dr. John Law, then Bishop of Clonfert; and a half-length, without his robes, in 1787 for Edward Law, afterwards Lord Ellenborough.

== Works ==
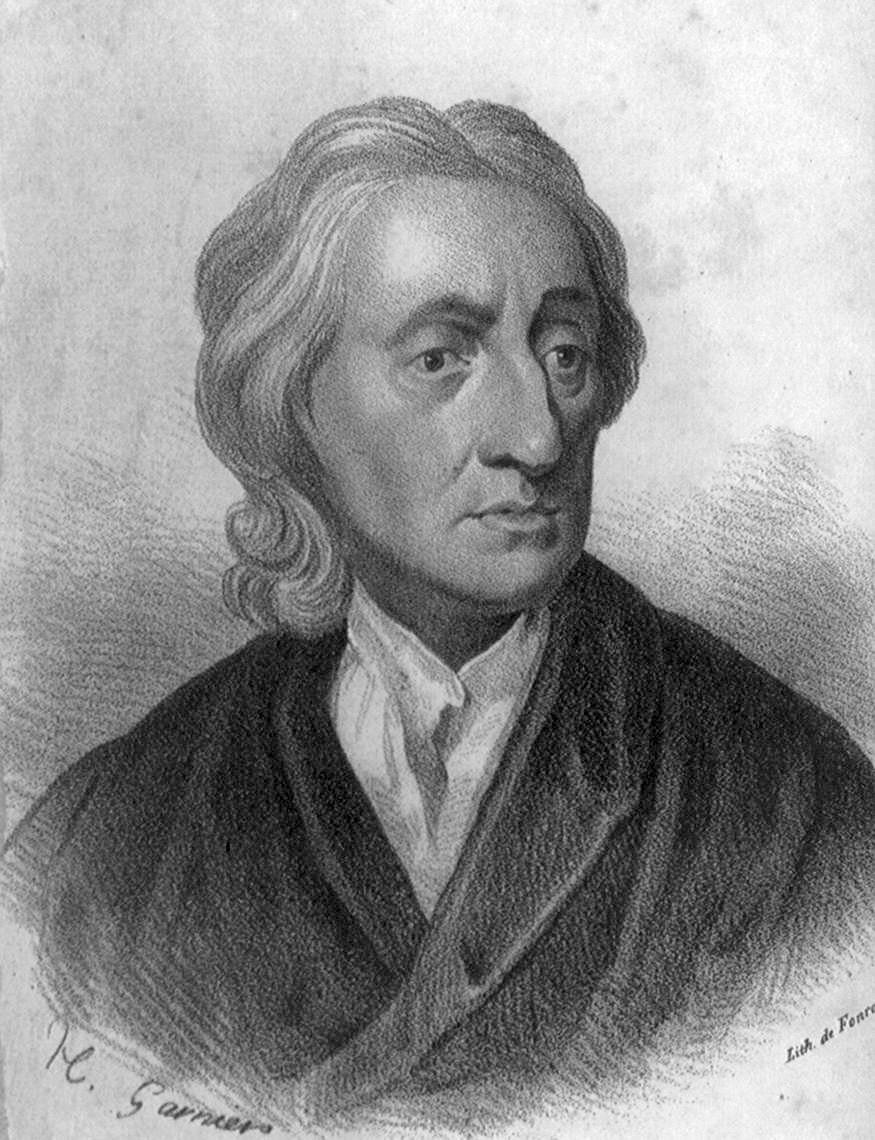
Law was an ardent disciple of John Locke.

His first literary work was his Essay on the Origin of Evil, a translation of Archbishop William King's De Origine Mali, which Law illustrated with copious notes in 1731. In 1734, while still at Christ's College, he prepared, with John Taylor, Thomas Johnson, and Sandys Hutchinson, an edition of Robert Estienne's Thesaurus Linguæ Latinæ, and in the same year appeared his Enquiry into the Ideas of Space and Time, an attack upon à priori proofs of the existence of God, in answer to a work by John Jackson entitled The Existence and Unity of God proved from his Nature and Attributes.

The work by which he is perhaps best known, Considerations on the State of the World with regard to the Theory of Religion, was published by him at Cambridge in 1745. The main idea of the book is that the human race has been, and is, through a process of divine education, gradually and continuously progressing in religion, natural or revealed, at the same rate as it progresses in all other knowledge. In his philosophical opinions he was an ardent disciple of John Locke, in politics he was a whig, and as a priest he represented the most latitudinarian position of the day, but his Christian belief was grounded firmly on the evidence of miracles The Theory of Religion went through many editions, being subsequently enlarged with Reflections on the Life and Character of Christ, and an Appendix concerning the use of the words Soul and Spirit in the Holy Scripture. Another edition, with Paley's life of the author prefixed, was published by his son, George Henry Law, then bishop of Chester, in 1820. A German translation, made from the fifth enlarged edition, was printed at Leipzig in 1771.

In 1754, Law advocated in his public exercise for the degree of D.D. his favourite doctrine that the soul, which in his view was not naturally immortal, passed into a state of sleep between death and the resurrection. This theory met with much opposition; it was, however, defended by Archdeacon Francis Blackburne.

In 1774, Law, now a bishop, published anonymously an outspoken declaration in favour of religious toleration in a pamphlet entitled Considerations on the Propriety of requiring Subscription to Articles of Faith. It was suggested by a petition presented to parliament in 1772, by Archdeacon Francis Blackburne and others for the abolition of subscription, and Law argued that it was unreasonable to impose upon a clergyman in any church more than a promise to comply with its liturgy, rites, and offices, without exacting any profession of such minister's present belief, still less any promise of constant belief, in particular doctrines. The publication was attacked by Thomas Randolph of Oxford, and defended by A Friend of Religious Liberty in a tract attributed by some to Paley, and said to have been his first literary production.

In 1777, Law published an edition of the Works of Locke, in 4 vols., with a preface and a life of the author. This included, anonymously, his 1769 essay 'A Defence of Mr. Locke's Opinion Concerning Personal Identity'. Law also published several sermons. His interleaved Bible, with many manuscript notes, is preserved in the British Museum.

== See also ==
- List of bishops of Carlisle

== Notes ==
Church of England titles
Preceded by Charles Lyttelton	Bishop of Carlisle; 1768–1787	Succeeded by John Douglas
Academic offices
Preceded by Edmund Keene	Master of Peterhouse, Cambridge; 1754–1787	Succeeded by Francis Barnes
