= John Law (bishop) =

English mathematician and clergyman

- Born: 1745
- Died: 1810 (aged 64–65)
- Occupation: Bishop

John Law (1745–1810) was an English mathematician and clergyman who began his career as a Fellow of Christ's College, Cambridge, and went on to become chaplain to the Lord Lieutenant of Ireland and Church of Ireland bishop of Clonfert and Kilmacduagh (1782–1787), Killala and Achonry (1787–1795), and finally of Elphin (1795–1810).

He was a lifelong friend and correspondent of the philosopher William Paley.

== Early life ==
The son of Edmund Law, later Bishop of Carlisle, and Mary Christian, Law was born at Greystoke in Cumberland, where his father was rector. He was educated at Charterhouse School and Christ's College, Cambridge, where in 1766 he graduated Bachelor of Arts with first-class honours in the Mathematical Tripos and was named as second Wrangler. He proceeded Master of Arts in 1769.

== Career ==
Law became a Fellow of Christ's and an Anglican clergyman, and spent several years as a tutor and lecturer at Cambridge. In 1773 his father gave him his first benefices, as vicar of Warkworth, Northumberland, and as prebendary of Carlisle. In 1777 he was collated Archdeacon of Carlisle. In April 1782, he went to Ireland as chaplain to the Lord Lieutenant of Ireland, William Cavendish-Bentinck, 3rd Duke of Portland, who had large estates in Cumberland.

Law was quickly nominated as Bishop of Clonfert and Kilmacduagh on 26 July 1782 and consecrated on 21 September. The same year, he graduated Doctor of Divinity. The appointment to Clonfert was unexpected. It was later reported that the Duke of Portland, after a long legal battle with Sir James Lowther over estates in Carlisle, was anxious to reward a man who had helped him in that matter with other preferments then held by Law.

Law was a lifelong friend of William Paley, with whom he corresponded for decades. Paley and Law had been friends at Cambridge, where Law lectured on mathematics and Paley on metaphysics and morals. When Law became Bishop of Clonfert, Paley was his successor as Archdeacon of Carlisle, and it was the urging of Law which led Paley to expand his Cambridge lectures into his book The Principles of Moral and Political Philosophy (1785). In that work, the chapter on Reverencing the Deity was ascribed to Law. Among other matters, they corresponded on the scientific proofs which could be used to support a theological argument. In 1797, for instance, Law wrote to Paley: "In your chapter on divine contrivance, you must have an article on the solar system..."

On taking up the post in Clonfert, Law hired the mathematician John Howard as his steward, but dispensed with Howard's services in 1786 after "an unfortunate marriage".

Law was translated to Killala and Achonry on 10 November 1787. On learning that almost the whole population of his new see were Roman Catholics, he commented: "That as it was a hopeless task to make them protestants, it would answer every desirable purpose to make them good catholicks." At his own expense, Law then distributed throughout the diocese a new edition of the Rev. John Gother's The Sincere Christian's Guide in the Choice of Religion.

He was translated again to become Bishop of Elphin in 1795, being nominated on 11 March and appointed by letters patent on 27 March. He died in Dublin on 18 March 1810 and was buried in the Chapel of Trinity College, Dublin, where he had founded prizes for mathematics.

== Family ==
On 17 January 1782, while living in Carlisle, Law married Anne Thomlinson, a daughter of the Rev. William Plaskett and widow of John Thomlinson of Blencogo, Cumberland, but they had no children. His wife, born on 4 August 1741, was the half-sister of James Wallace, barrister, of Featherstone Castle, Member of Parliament, Solicitor General and Attorney General, and the aunt of Thomas Wallace, 1st Baron Wallace.

Law was the elder brother of Ewan Law MP (1747–1829), of Edward Law, 1st Baron Ellenborough (1750–1818), who became Lord Chief Justice of England and Wales, and of George Henry Law (1761–1845), Bishop of Chester and Bishop of Bath and Wells. Another brother, Thomas Law (1756–1834), was a business man who settled first in British India and then in 1793 in the United States, where he married as his second wife Eliza Parke Custis, a granddaughter of Martha Washington. Eliza and Thomas Law divorced in 1811.

== Publications ==
- A Sermon preached at the Visitation of the Right Reverend the Lord Bishop of London: in the church of Thaxted, in Essex, on Wednesday, 28 May 1778 (1778)
- Sermon preached in Christ Church, Dublin, before the Incorporated Society (1796)
- Sermon preached in St Paul's Cathedral, London, at the meeting of the charity school children (1797)

Church of Ireland titles
Preceded by Walter Cope	Bishop of Clonfert and Kilmacduagh; 1782–1787	Succeeded by Richard Marlay
Preceded by William Preston	Bishop of Killala and Achonry; 1787–1795	Succeeded by John Porter
Preceded by Charles Dodgson	Bishop of Elphin; 1795–1810	Succeeded by Power Le Poer Trench
