= M. A. Sherring =

Matthew Atmore Sherring (1826–1880), usually cited as M. A. Sherring, was an Anglican missionary in British India who was also an Indologist and wrote a number of works related to India. He was educated at Coward College, a dissenting academy in London that trained people for nonconformist ministry.

Sherring joined the London Missionary Society and worked in the city of Varanasi, about which he wrote a significant book (The Sacred City of the Hindus: An Account of Benares in Ancient and Modern Times).

== Works ==
- The Indian Church during the Great Rebellion: An Authentic Narrative of the Disasters that Befell It, Its Sufferings, and Faithfulness Unto Death of Many of its European and Native Members , London: James Nisbet & Co., 1859.
- Journal of Missionary Tours to Fyzabad in Oude, and Singrowlee in the Mirzapore District, North West Provinces, India, During the Winter of 1861-1862, Mirzapore (India): Orphan School Press, 1862.
- Benares and its Antiquities: A Lecture Delivered ... Before the Benares Debating Club on the 25th July, 1863, Benares [Varanasi]: Medical Hall Press, 1863.
- Description of the Buddhist Ruins at Bakariya Kund, Benares, Calcutta: Baptist Mission Press, 1865. Joint author: C. Horne.
- The Sacred City of the Hindus: An Account of Benares in Ancient and Modern Times, London: Trübner & Co., 1868. With an introduction by Fitzedward Hall.
- Hindu Tribes and Castes, Calcutta: Thacker, Spink, & Co., 1872–1881. 3 volumes, as follows: Vol. 1: Hindu tribes and castes, as represented in Benares; Vol. 2: Hindu tribes and castes; together with an account of the Mahomedan tribes of the North-West Frontier and of the aboriginal tribes of the Central Provinces; Vol. 3: Hindu tribes and castes; together with three dissertations: on the natural history of Hindu caste; the unity of the Hindu race; and the prospects of Indian caste; and including a general index of the three volumes.
- Hand-book for Visitors to Benares... With Four Plans of the City and Neighbourhood, Calcutta: W. Newman & Co., 3, Dalhousie Square, 1875.
- The Hindoo Pilgrims, London: Trübner & Co, 1878.
- The History of Protestant Missions in India: From their Commencement in 1706 to 1881, London: Religious Tract Society, 1884. "New ed., carefully revised and brought down to date, by the Rev. Edward Storrow. With four maps."
- The Tribes and Castes of the Madras Presidency: Together with an Account of the Tribes and Castes of Mysore, Niligiri and Travancore ..., New Delhi: Cosmo Publications, 1975.
