= Samuel Estwick II =

British politician

Samuel Estwick (1770–1797) was a British politician who sat in the House of Commons from 1795 to 1796.

Estwick was the eldest son of Samuel Estwick of Barbados and Berkeley Street London and his second wife Grace Langford daughter of Jonas Langford of Theobald’s Park, Hertfordshire and was born on 22 January 1770. He was probably educated at Eton College in 1782 and matriculated at Queen's College, Oxford on 31 August 1787. He was awarded MA on 10 March 1791 and DCL on 5 July 1793. He married Hon. Cassandra Julia Hawke, daughter of Martin Bladen Hawke, 2nd Baron Hawke, on 15 July 1793.

At a by-election on 15 January 1795 Estwick joined his father as a Member of Parliament for Westbury on Lord Abingdon’s interest. He supported Pitt, but was unable to lead an active political life because of ill-health. He did not stand in 1796. There is no known speech or vote by him.

Estwick retired to Madeira, where he died in February 1797. He left his West Indies estates to his brothers.

Parliament of Great Britain
Preceded by Ewan Law; Samuel Estwick	Member of Parliament for Westbury; 1795–1796; With: Samuel Estwick; Edward Wilbraham-Bootle	Succeeded by Sir Henry Paulet St John-Mildmay, Bt; George Ellis
