= Hacheston Halt railway station =

Disused railway station in England

Coordinates: 52.1831°N 1.3780°E

Hacheston Halt

General information
- Location: Hacheston, East Suffolk; England
- Platforms: ground level

Other information
- Status: Disused

History
- Pre-grouping: Great Eastern Railway
- Post-grouping: London and North Eastern Railway; Eastern Region of British Railways

Key dates
- 1922: Station opens
- 3 Nov 1952: Station closes
Location

Hacheston Halt railway station was a station located in Hacheston, Suffolk situated on the Framlingham Branch.

The branch was opened in 1859, but Hacheston Halt was not opened until 1922 in an attempt by the Great Eastern Railway to improve the passenger receipts on the branch. Hacheston Halt was a very basic station and did not even possess a platform so passengers had to use a ladder to get on and off the trains that called at the station.

The station was served by trains that operated between Framlingham and Wickham Market; Withdrawal of passenger services in November, 1952.

Preceding station	Disused railways	Following station
Parham	Framlingham Branch	Marlesford
