= Thomas Wenman (MP for Westbury) =

British politician (1745–1796)

The Honourable Thomas Francis Wenman FRS (18 November 1745 – 8 April 1796) was a British professor, natural historian, and antiquarian.

Wenman was the second son of Philip Wenman, 6th Viscount Wenman and his wife Sophia, daughter and co-heiress of James Herbert of Tythorpe. He was born at Thame Park, near Thame, Oxfordshire in 1745. He was educated at University College, Oxford, matriculating on 22 October 1762. On 12 May 1764, he was admitted to the Inner Temple as a student.

In 1765, while studying law, he was elected a fellow of All Souls College, Oxford, and in 1770, he was called to the bar. He received degrees in civil law from Oxford as well, becoming a BCL in 1771 and a DCL in 1780. Wenman unsuccessfully contested Wallingford in 1774, but was returned for Westbury, and sat in the House of Commons for the constituency until 1780.

Wenman was elected a Fellow of the Royal Society on 21 January 1779. Perhaps due to his antiquarian propensities, he was elected Keeper of the Archives of Oxford University on 15 January 1781, and was made deputy steward of the University in December.

In 1789, he was appointed Regius Professor of Civil Law in succession to Robert Vansittart, but his real interest lay in natural history and botany. While collecting specimens, he fell into the River Cherwell, near Water Eaton, and was drowned on 8 April 1796. He was buried in the chapel of All Souls on 15 April 1796.

Parliament of Great Britain
Preceded by Peregrine Bertie; Charles Dillon	Member of Parliament for Westbury; 1774–1780; With: Nathaniel Bayly 1774–1779; Samuel Estwick 1779–1780	Succeeded by Samuel Estwick; John Whalley-Gardiner
