= Marlesford =

Village in Suffolk, England

Coordinates: 52°10′N 1°24′E

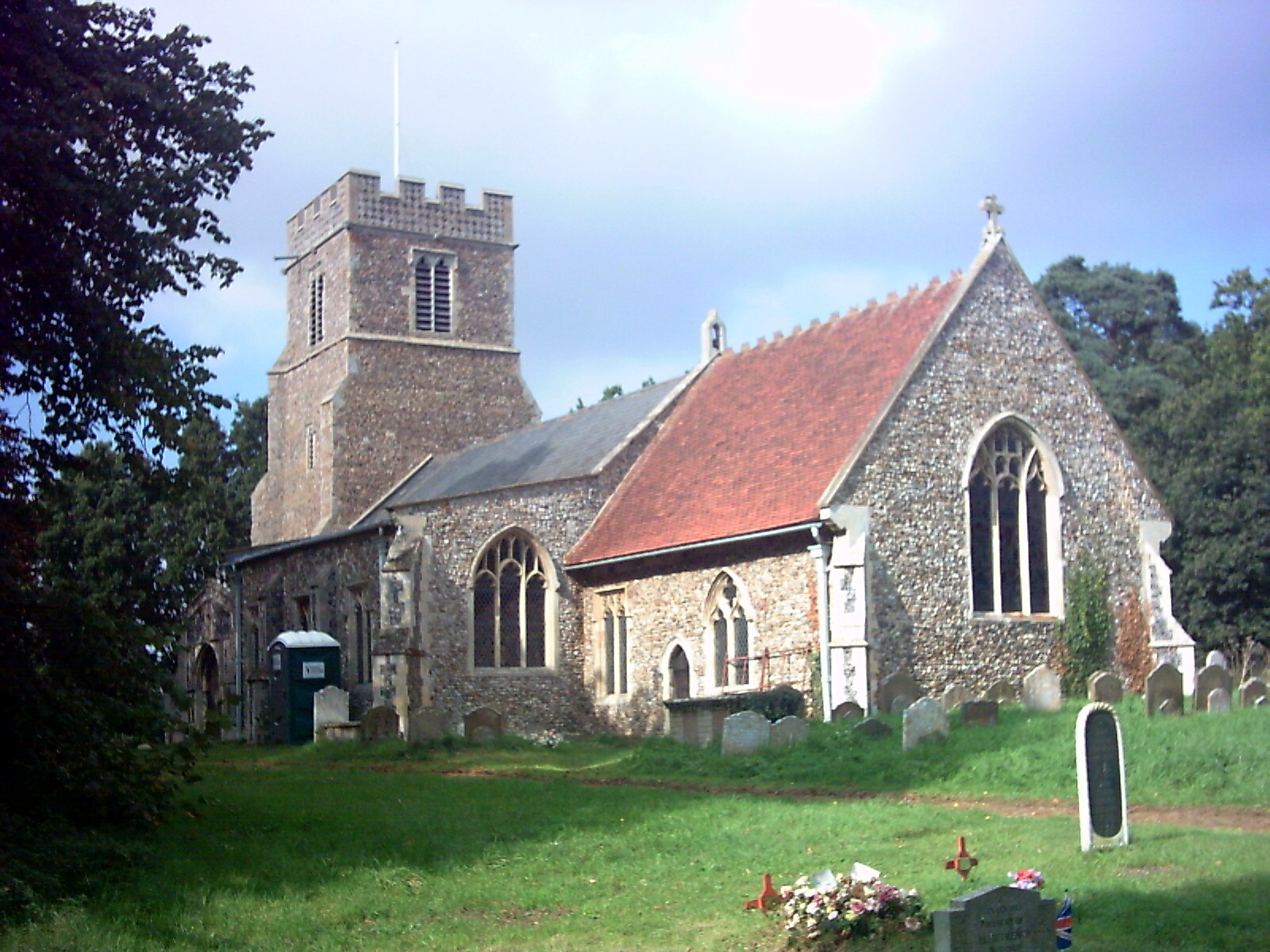
- St Andrew's Church, Marlesford

- Location within Suffolk
- Population: 233 (2011 Census)
- Civil parish: Marlesford
- District: East Suffolk
- Shire county: Suffolk
- Region: East
- Country: England
- Sovereign state: United Kingdom
- Post town: WOODBRIDGE
- Postcode district: IP13
- Dialling code: 01728
- Police: Suffolk
- Fire: Suffolk
- Ambulance: East of England
- UK Parliament: Suffolk Coastal

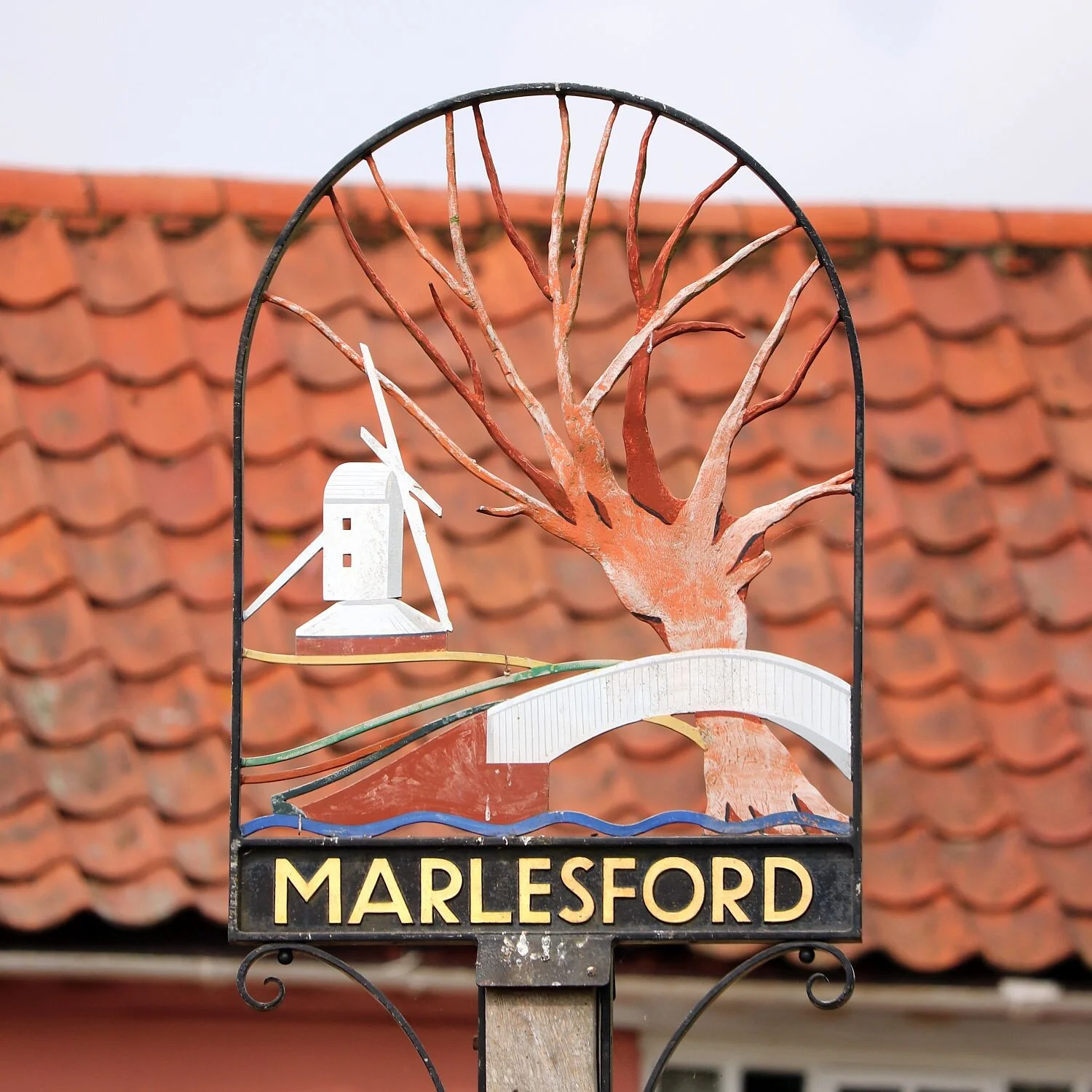
Marlesford Village Sign

Marlesford is a village and civil parish in the East Suffolk district of Suffolk, England. The population of the civil parish at the 2011 Census was 233.

== Location ==
The village is about two miles away from the small town of Wickham Market. Marlesford has a place of worship. The area of the village that is on the A12 road (where the pub was) is due to be bypassed. However, the scheme is currently on hold.

The village was served by Marlesford railway station until it closed in 1952.

== Notable residents ==
- H. A. Douglas-Hamilton (1853−1929), clergyman and cricketer
- Fitzedward Hall (1825−1901), Orientalist and philologist
- Mark Schreiber, Baron Marlesford (1931−2025), farmer and politician
