= Chaloner Arcedeckne =

British politician

Arms of Ercedecne / Erchdecon / Archdekne / Archdeacon, of Haccombe, Devon: Argent, three chevronels sable. These are also the arms of the commune of Erchin in Northern France

Chaloner Arcedeckne (c. 1743 – 20 December 1809) was a British politician and landowner.

== Biography ==
He descended from the Arcedecknes, an Anglo-Irish family who arrived in Suffolk and made it their home. His father, Andrew Arcedeckne (d. Jamaica, 17 August 1763) of Gurnamone, County Galway, was Attorney General of Jamaica, and he established Jamaica's Golden Grove slave-worked sugar plantation in 1734. His mother was Elizabeth Kersey (b. Jamaica; d. circa 1743). A creole, Arcedeckne was educated at Eton and Christ Church, Oxford.

Arcedeckne inherited the property in Jamaica from his father. Benjamin Cowell, Arcedeckne's brother-in-law, was his business partner, arranging the insurance for sugar cargoes shipped to England from Golden Grove. As an absentee proprietor, Arcedeckne also depended upon the Jamaican estate attorney, Simon Taylor (sugar planter), who went on to become the wealthiest sugar planter in Jamaica. As an attorney, Taylor was Arcedeckne's "most frequent client and correspondent".

Sir John Blois, 5th Baronet lent Cockfield Hall to Arcedeckne in the 1770s for 21 years, after which Arcedeckne built Glevering Hall as his seat in 1794. In 1780, he became MP for Wallingford and, in 1784, he sat for Westbury, resigning from the latter by becoming Steward of the Manor of East Hendred. He was High Sheriff of Suffolk during the period of 1797–98.

Arcedeckne died on 20 December 1809. He had married Catherine, daughter and coheir of John Leigh of Northcourt Manor, Isle of Wight. They had four children, sons Andrew and Chaloner, and daughters, Frances-Katherine and Mary-Louisa. His son, Andrew was also an MP.

Parliament of Great Britain
Preceded by John Cator; Robert Barker	Member of Parliament for Wallingford; 1780–1784; With: John Aubrey 1780–84; Francis Sykes from 1784	Succeeded by Francis Sykes; Thomas Aubrey
Preceded by Sir John Whalley-Gardiner, Bt; Samuel Estwick	Member of Parliament for Westbury; 1784–1786; With: Samuel Estwick	Succeeded by Samuel Estwick; John Madocks
