= Fitzedward Hall =

American Orientalist and philologist

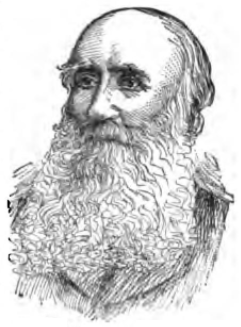

Personal details
- Born: 21 March 1825 Troy, New York, United States
- Died: 1 February 1901 (aged 75) Marlesford, Suffolk, England
- Education: Rensselaer Polytechnic Institute; Harvard University
- Occupation: Orientalist, philologist

Fitzedward Hall (21 March 1825 - 1 February 1901) was an American Orientalist and philologist. He was the first American to edit a Sanskrit text, and was an early collaborator in the Oxford English Dictionary (OED) project.

== Life ==
Hall was born on 21 March 1825 in Troy, New York, where his father was a lawyer.

He graduated with the degree of civil engineer from the Rensselaer Polytechnic Institute at Troy in 1842, and entered Harvard in the class of 1846. His Harvard classmates included Charles Eliot Norton, who later visited him in India in 1849, and Francis James Child. Just before his class graduated but after completing the work for his degree he abruptly left college and took ship out of Boston to India, allegedly in search of a runaway brother. His ship foundered and was wrecked on its approach to the harbor of Calcutta, where he found himself stranded. Although it was not his intention, he was never to return to the United States. At this time, he began his study of Indian languages, and in January 1850 he was appointed tutor in the Government Sanskrit College at Benares. In 1852, he became the first American to edit a Sanskrit text, namely the Vedanta treatises Ātmabodha and Tattvabodha. In 1853, he became professor of Sanskrit and English at the Government Sanskrit College; and in 1855 was appointed to the post of Inspector of Public Instruction in Ajmere-Merwara and in 1856 in the Central Provinces.

In 1857, Hall was caught up in the Sepoy Mutiny. The Manchester Guardian later gave this account:

When the Mutiny broke out he was Inspector of Public Instruction for Central India, and was beleaguered in the Saugor Fort. He had become an expert tiger shooter, and turned this proficiency to account during the siege of the fort, and afterwards as a volunteer in the struggle for the re-establishment of the British power in India.

In 1859, he published at Calcutta his discursive and informative A Contribution Towards an Index to the Bibliography of the Indian Philosophical Systems, based on the holdings of the Benares College and his own collection of Sanskrit manuscripts, as well as numerous other private collections he had examined. In the introduction, he regrets that this production was in press in Allahabad and would have been put before the public in 1857, "had it not been impressed to feed a rebel bonfire."

He settled in England and in 1862 received the appointment to the Chair of Sanskrit, Hindustani and Indian jurisprudence in King's College London, and to the librarianship of the India Office. An unsuccessful attempt was made by his friends to lure him back to Harvard by endowing a Chair of Sanskrit for him there, but this project came to nothing. He gave his collection of a thousand Oriental manuscripts to Harvard.

Hall's experience as an American Sanskritologist in Benares can be found in a review of his friend Sherring's The Sacred City of the Hindus (to which Hall contributed the introduction), in the July 1869 issue of The Christian Examiner:

Missionary Sherring devotes a large volume to a minute description of the holy city of Benares, because being the living oracle of the nation, presiding over the religious destiny of one hundred and eighty million, its future requires study. Here Hinduism is at home, in the bosom of its friends and admirers, courted by princes and millionaires, sustained by innumerable resources, embellished by thousands of temples and hundreds of thousands of idols, swarming with pilgrims, and crowned with the offerings of a superstitious devotion. Unhappily, he confines himself too much to the surface of things, giving us the dimensions of one temple after another in tedious iteration; the abundance of images, the superabundant filth, the manifest decay, the half-hidden traces of more ancient structures, marking them with a general uniformity. These shrines of one of the oldest religions are neither so vast, so beautiful, nor so worthy of imitation, as to require or repay this minute delineation. But very few and imperfectly illustrated are Mr Sherring's views of the condition of Hinduism itself and its future. Judged externally, it was never so flourishing; making an extraordinary effort to maintain itself against the inroads of European civilization under its priests, pundits, and princes; maintaining this immense city almost upon piety alone, gathering pilgrims by the acre, numbering its still occupied temples in its sacred city by the thousand. But beneath all this parade of piety is the increase of the thirst for knowledge as never before, the multiplication of debating societies, the predilection of young men for study, and the absolute freedom of thought; above all, the spreading sect of the Brahmos, who co-operate with the telegraph and railroad, the canal and the metalled road, in throwing India open to the quickening civilization of Europe. Few, indeed, study the Vedas now; Sanscrit is getting out of date; all classes are becoming scandalized by idolatry; Hinduism is held by a relaxing grasp; whenever the tide changes openly when the warm imagination of the Hindu is turned to Christianity, and his heart vitalized by its influence, India will lead the rest of Asia in casting her idols away, will be the servant of a new civilization and the herald of a higher humanity.

== Hall and the Oxford English Dictionary ==
In 1869 Hall was dismissed by the India Office, which accused him (by his own account) of being a drunk and a foreign spy, and expelled from the Philological Society after a series of acrimonious exchanges in the letters columns of various journals.

He then moved to Suffolk where, while leading the life of a recluse, he published more philological work. W. W. Skeat, an early supporter of the OED idea, persuaded him to collaborate as a reader for the project. With another US citizen, Dr. William Chester Minor, he would become one of the most important (and most obsessive) collaborators the OED Project's director Sir James Murray (1837–1915) had, and is recognized as such in many of the prefaces to the Dictionary itself. His task was to read certain books looking for examples of the use of particular words, and then to send the relevant quotations to Murray's staff.

According to scholar Elizabeth Knowles, who studied the Murray-Hall correspondence in the OED archives, Hall spent "four hours a day...on proofs" and that "for much of the rest of the time, he was reading for vocabulary." Once he supplied more than 200 examples of the use of the word "hand" and had to be told that there was no space for so many.

Murray himself would say that "Time would fail to tell of the splendid assistance rendered to the Dictionary by Dr. Fitzedward Hall, who devotes nearly his whole day to reading the proofs...and to supplementing, correcting, and increasing the quotations taken from his own exhaustless stores. When the Dictionary is finished, no man will have contributed to its illustrative wealth so much as Fitzedward Hall. Those who know his books know the enormous wealth of quotation which he brings to bear upon every point of English literary usage; but my admiration is if possible increased when I see how he can cap and put the cope-stone on the collections of our 1500 readers."

Hall was best at supplementing existing quotation collections for particular words. Despite exchanging letters almost daily for twenty years, Hall and Murray never met.

Fitzedward Hall died at Marlesford, Suffolk, on 1 February 1901. After his death, Murray corresponded with Hall's son to try to find and reference the supplies of quotations his father had noted but not submitted, with unclear results.

== Works ==
His works include:

- in Sanskrit
  - Atmabodha (1852)
  - Sankhyapravachana (1856)
  - Suryasiddhanta (1859)
  - Vsavadatt (1859)
  - Sankhyasara (1862)
  - Dasarupa (1865)
- in Hindi
  - Ballantyne's Hindi Grammar (1868)
  - a Reader (1870)
- on English philology
  - "Recent Exemplifications of False Philology" (1872), attacking Richard Grant White, Modern English (1873)
  - "On English Adjectives in -able, with Special Reference to Reliable" (American Journal of Philology, 1877)
  - Doctor Indoctus (1880).
  - "On the origin of 'had rather go' and analogous or apparently analogous locutions." American Journal of Philology 2 (1881), 281–322. (A recent comment on this: "Much of Hall's discussion is framed in the form of orotund footnotes which could almost have been the model for Flann O'Brien's preposterous de Selby commentaries.")
