= Charles Dodgson (priest) =

Anglican clergyman, scholar

The Venerable Charles Dodgson
- Archdeacon of Richmond
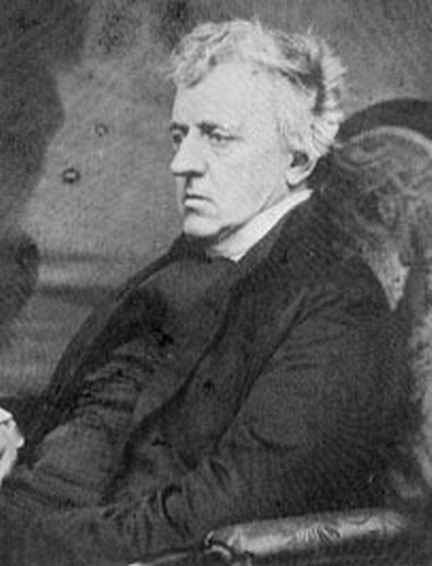
- Diocese: Ripon
- In office: 1854–1868
- Predecessor: John Headlam
- Successor: Edwards Cust

Personal details
- Born: 1800 Hamilton, Lanarkshire, Scotland
- Died: 21 June 1868 (aged 67–68)
- Denomination: Anglican
- Parents: Charles Dodgson
- Spouse: Fanny Lutwidge
- Children: Four sons, seven daughters; including Lewis Carroll and Edwin Dodgson
- Education: Westminster School; Christ Church, Oxford

Charles Dodgson (1800 – 21 June 1868) was an Anglican cleric, scholar and author, who was Archdeacon of Richmond. He was the father of Charles Lutwidge Dodgson, better known as Lewis Carroll.

== Biography ==
Charles Dodgson was born in 1800 in Hamilton, Lanarkshire, Scotland, the son of Charles Dodgson, an army captain, and grandson of Charles Dodgson, Bishop of Elphin. He was educated at Westminster School and Christ Church, Oxford, where he graduated in 1821 with a double first in mathematics and classics. He was elected a Student of Christ Church and taught mathematics there until 1827.

In 1827, Dodgson married his cousin, Frances Jane "Fanny" Lutwidge and was thereby required to give up his college position. He was appointed to a college living as perpetual curate of All Saints' Church, Daresbury. Ten of their eleven children, including Charles Lutwidge, were born here. The living was not a wealthy one and Dodgson ran a school in the village to supplement his income. In 1836 he was additionally appointed examining chaplain to Charles Longley, the newly created Bishop of Ripon. During this period he and his wife educated all their children at home.

The headmaster of Warrington School, Thomas Vere Bayne, who had studied at Jesus College, Oxford, and who was a friend of Dodgson, used to walk over to visit Daresbury on Sundays, sometimes helping with the church services. Bayne would bring his son Vere, who became a lifelong friend of the young Charles Lutwidge. Other friends and visitors included Richard Durnford, Rector of Middleton, Lancashire; Francis Egerton, Member of Parliament for South Lancashire and John Wilson Patten, MP for North Lancashire.

Dodgson was concerned about the canal workers on the Bridgewater Canal running past his parish. Together with Egerton, who was a wealthy local landowner, he converted a barge into a floating chapel, moored at Preston Brook, and held weekly services there for the bargees.

In 1843 Dodgson was given the Crown living of Croft, Yorkshire, by the Prime Minister, Robert Peel, at the urging of Longley. In 1852 he was additionally collated as a canon of Ripon Cathedral and in 1854 became the Archdeacon of Richmond. At Croft he restored the chancel of St Peter's Church and again started a school, sacrificing part of the glebe to it. He taught there, as did his wife and later some of his children.

Dodgson was a contemporary and college friend of Edward Bouverie Pusey, a leader of the Oxford Movement. Dodgson was a "Puseyite" and contributed the volume on Tertullian to Pusey's series Library of the Fathers. All told he wrote twenty-four books on theology and religious subjects.

Dodgson's wife died on 26 January 1851 and he died on 21 June 1868.

== Bibliography ==
- Clark, Anne (1979). Lewis Carroll: A Biography. London: J. M. Dent & Sons. ISBN 978-0-460-04302-1.
- Cohen, Morton Norton (1995). Lewis Carroll: A Biography. Basingstoke, England: Macmillan. ISBN 978-0-333-62926-0.
- Collingwood, Stuart Dodgson (1898). The Life and Letters of Lewis Carroll. London: T. Fisher Unwin.
