= Framlingham branch =

Railway line in Suffolk, England

The Framlingham branch was a six-mile (9.7 km) single-track branch railway line from Wickham Market railway station on the East Suffolk Line to Framlingham in Suffolk, England, with three intermediate stations, Parham, Hacheston Halt, and Marlesford.

== Opening ==
The Framlingham branch was authorised in 1854 and built with several other railway lines by the East Suffolk Railway, including those from Halesworth to Woodbridge (now part of the East Suffolk line), Saxmundham to Leiston and the Snape branch line. Construction was straightforward as the countryside of East Suffolk is relatively flat. Flooding at Parham meant the river had to be diverted to protect the line of the railway.

The Framlingham branch started from a junction at Wickham Market station and was officially opened on 1 June 1859. However, the East Suffolk Railway was promptly incorporated into the Eastern Counties Railway, the dominant railway company on East Anglia. Before the opening, a special train was recorded as running in February 1859 from Woodbridge. The line south of Woodbridge was still being built by the Eastern Union Railway.

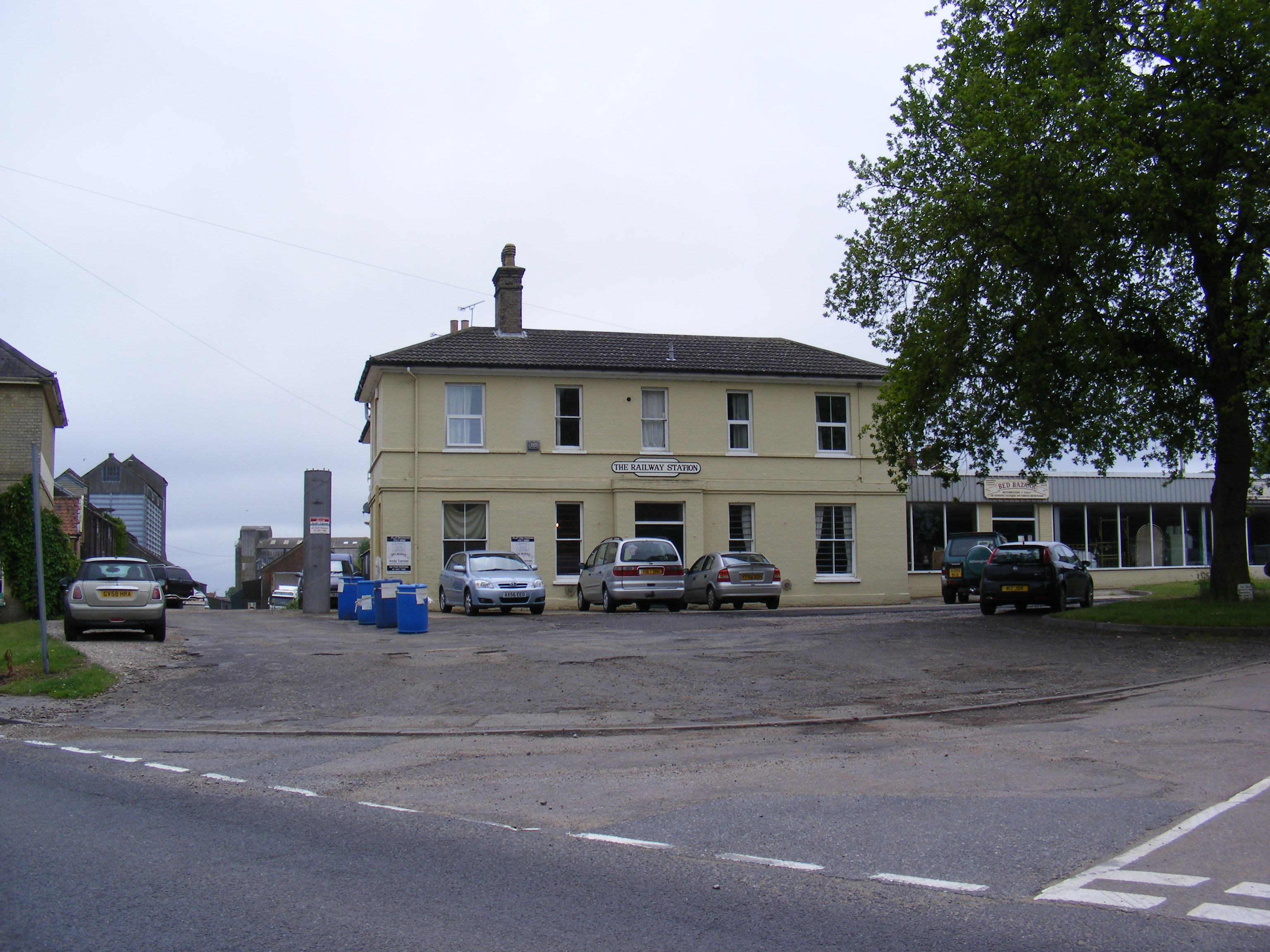
The former railway station at Framlingham

The Ipswich Journal of 4 June 1859 reported on the opening on the official opening day: "The bells rang merrily throughout the day, a cricket match was played, and tea was provided by Mr. John Pipe of the Crown Inn, in his usual style, of which 40 of the gentry and inhabitants of the town partook; appropriate speeches were made, songs sung, and a merry and convivial evening spent." Unfortunately an evening concert at the Corn Exchange was cancelled as the band leader Edward Plantin was involved in a serious accident at the station and died of his injuries a few days later.

== Early traffic ==
The service began with five daily passenger trains and a goods train. So successful was the coming of the railway to Framlingham that within months the latter had doubled to two goods trains a day. Passenger business came from trips to the developing seaside resorts, not just easy access to Ipswich and London. For instance in June 1865, a schools excursion was run from Framlingham to Aldeburgh at a cost of six shillings (£0.30). From the outset, Framlingham College made use of the railway both for college outings and at the beginning and end of terms. These trains continued running until March 1954.

As can be expected, most of the goods traffic was agricultural in nature, although photographs indicate some inward domestic coal.

== Later history ==
The branch became part of the Great Eastern Railway in 1862, the London & North Eastern Railway in 1923 and British Railways from 1948.

In 1922 Hacheston Halt was opened in an attempt to improve the line's poor passenger receipts.

Well used until the 1930s, when passenger numbers fell due to the increased popularity of road transport, the line closed to passenger services on 1 November 1952, and to freight on 19 April 1965. The Royal Train overnighted on the branch in May 1956 headed by B1 4-6-0s 61252 and 61399.

The branch was often served by mixed passenger/freight trains in latter years.

== Timetable ==
Bradshaws 1922 timetable (Table 316) showed five departures from Framlingham at 0720, 0830, 1240, 1625 and 1830. All services had connections to London Liverpool Street.

Journey times were 6 minutes from Framlingham to Parham, 6 minutes from Parham to Marlesford and 6 minutes to Wickham Market giving a total of 18 minutes.

From Wickham Market the trains departed at 0756, 0935, 1314, 1752 and 1910. All services except the 0935 departure had a connection from London Liverpool Street

== Locomotives ==
The line was operated by the Great Eastern Railway from 1862 until 1923 and it is locomotives from that company that predominantly operated the branch in London & North Eastern Railway and indeed up to closure under British Railways. Most locomotives would have been based at Ipswich engine shed which supplied branch line motive power for most branch lines in this area.

Steam locomotives included (numbers of specific locos recorded under BR 1948 numbering scheme unless stated). Unless stated otherwise these locomotives were all photographed by Dr Ian C Allen. His collection is listed at http://www.transporttreasury.co.uk/ianallencollection.html :

Class	Wheel Arrangement	Locos that worked branch	Reference
LNER Class B1	4-6-0	61252 61399	
LNER Class B12	4-6-0	61537,61561,61564,61569,61570,61571,61577	
LNER Class B17	4-6-0	2803 (LNER No)	
LNER Class D16	4-4-0	62526,62552,62590	
LNER Class E4	2-4-0	62785 62789	
LNER Class F3	2-4-2T	80xx (early LNER number?)7140 7150 (LNER numbers)	
LNER Class F6	2-4-2T	67220 67230 67239	as above and
LNER Class J15	0-6-0	65389,65433,65447,65454,65459,65467,65469,65478	as above
LNER Class J17	0-6-0	65578	as above

Diesel locomotives operated freight over the line, but as the passenger service had been withdrawn in 1952 only one diesel-hauled passenger train is believed to have worked the branch. This was a Ramblers special and was hauled by Class 31 no D5587.

Class	Wheel Arrangement	Locos that worked branch	References
Class 15	Bo-Bo	D8215, D8220, D8221, D8223, D8229	As above
Class 21	Bo-Bo	D6117	
Class 24	Bo-Bo	D5036, D5041, D5047, D5049	
Class 30/31	A1A-A1A	D5520, D5587	

== Local photographer ==
Many of the last years of the branch were photographed by Dr Ian Cameron Allen (1910–1989), a local GP. Allen compiled a number of photographic books about railways in East Anglia, in which the Framlingham branch often featured.
