= Charles Dodgson (bishop) =

English Anglican cleric

The Right Reverend Charles Dodgson FRS
- Bishop of Elphin
- Church: Church of Ireland
- Province: Armagh
- Diocese: Elphin
- Appointed: 12 April 1775
- Term ended: 21 January 1795
- Predecessor: Jemmett Browne
- Successor: John Law
- Other post: Bishop of Ossory (1765–1775)

Orders
- Consecration: 11 August 1765 by William Carmichael

Personal details
- Born: c. 1722 Howden, Yorkshire, England
- Died: 21 January 1795 Dublin, Ireland
- Buried: St. Bride's Church, Dublin
- Denomination: Anglican
- Spouse: Mary Frances Smyth (m. 1768)
- Children: Three sons, one daughter
- Education: St. John's College, Cambridge

Charles Dodgson FRS (c. 1722 – 21 January 1795) was an English Anglican cleric who served in the Church of Ireland as the Bishop of Ossory (1765–1775) then Bishop of Elphin (1775–1795).

Dodgson was born in Howden, Yorkshire. His date of birth is not recorded; he was baptised on 10 January 1722. His father, Christopher Dodgson (1696–1750), was the curate there. Charles Dodgson was educated at Westminster School and St. John's College, Cambridge.

After ordination, he was appointed to the parish of Bintry, Norfolk in 1746. He moved to the north of England, keeping a school at Stanwix in Cumberland and becoming Rector of Kirby Wiske in 1755. He was tutor to Lord Algernon Percy, the son of the Duke of Northumberland; in 1762, the Duke gave him the parish of Elsdon, Northumberland. Dodgson was elected as a fellow of the Royal Society in 1762.

Rapidly promoted, he was nominated to the bishopric of Ossory on 22 June and consecrated at St. Werburgh's Church, Dublin on 11 August 1765 by William Carmichael, Archbishop of Dublin. Ten years later, he was translated to the bishopric of Elphin by letters patent on 12 April 1775. King George III congratulated him on this promotion, saying that he ought indeed to be thankful to have got away from a palace where the stabling was so bad.

== Marriage and children ==
In 1768, he married Mary Frances Smyth (1749–1796). Among their children were Captain Charles Dodgson (1769?–1803), Elizabeth Anne Dodgson (1770–1836) and 2nd Lieut. Percy Currer Dodgson RN (1782–1807). Captain Dodgson was the father of Charles Dodgson (Archdeacon of Richmond) and the grandfather of Lewis Carroll. Elizabeth Dodgson married Major Charles Lutwidge; among their children was Frances, mother of Lewis Carroll.

He died in Dublin on 21 January 1795 and was buried at St. Bride's Church, Dublin.

== Notes ==
Church of Ireland titles
| Preceded by Richard Pococke | Bishop of Ossory; 1765–1775 | Succeeded by William Newcome |
| Preceded by Jemmett Browne | Bishop of Elphin; 1775–1795 | Succeeded by John Law |
