= John Taylor (classical scholar) =

English classical scholar

- Born: 22 June 1704; Shrewsbury, Shropshire, England
- Died: 4 April 1766 (aged 61); London, England
- Education: St John's College, Cambridge
- Occupation: Classical scholar
- Notable work: Elements of Civil Law, translations of Greek orators

John Taylor (22 June 1704 – 4 April 1766), English classical scholar, was born at Shrewsbury in Shropshire, England.

== Life ==
His father was a barber, and, by the generosity of one of his close customers, the son, having received his early education at the grammar school of his native town, was sent to St John's College, Cambridge. In 1732, he was appointed librarian, and in 1734 Registrary of the university. Somewhat late in life he took orders and became rector of Lawford in Essex in 1751, Archdeacon of Buckingham in 1753, canon of St Paul's in 1757. He died in London on 4 April 1766, aged 61 and was buried in St Paul's Cathedral.

He is also shown as Prebendary of Aylesbury from 1745 to 1747 and again from 1750 to 1756.

Taylor is best known for his editions of some of the Greek orators, chiefly valuable for the notes on Attic law, e.g. Lysias (1739); Demosthenes' Contra Leptinem (1741) and Contra Midiam (1743, with Lycurgus' Contra Leocratem), intended as specimens of a proposed edition, in five volumes, of the orations of Demosthenes, Aeschines, Dinarchus, and Demades, of which only vols. ii and iii were published.

Taylor also published (under the title of Marmor Sandvicense) a commentary on the inscription on an ancient marble brought from Greece by Lord Sandwich, containing particulars of the receipts and expenditures of the Athenian magistrates appointed to celebrate the festival of Apollo at Delos in 374 BC. His Elements of Civil Law (1755) also deserves notice. It was severely attacked by William Warburton in his Divine Legation of Moses, professedly owing to a difference of opinion in regard to the persecution of the early Christians, in reality because Taylor had spoken disparagingly of his scholarship.
