= John Madocks =

Welsh politician

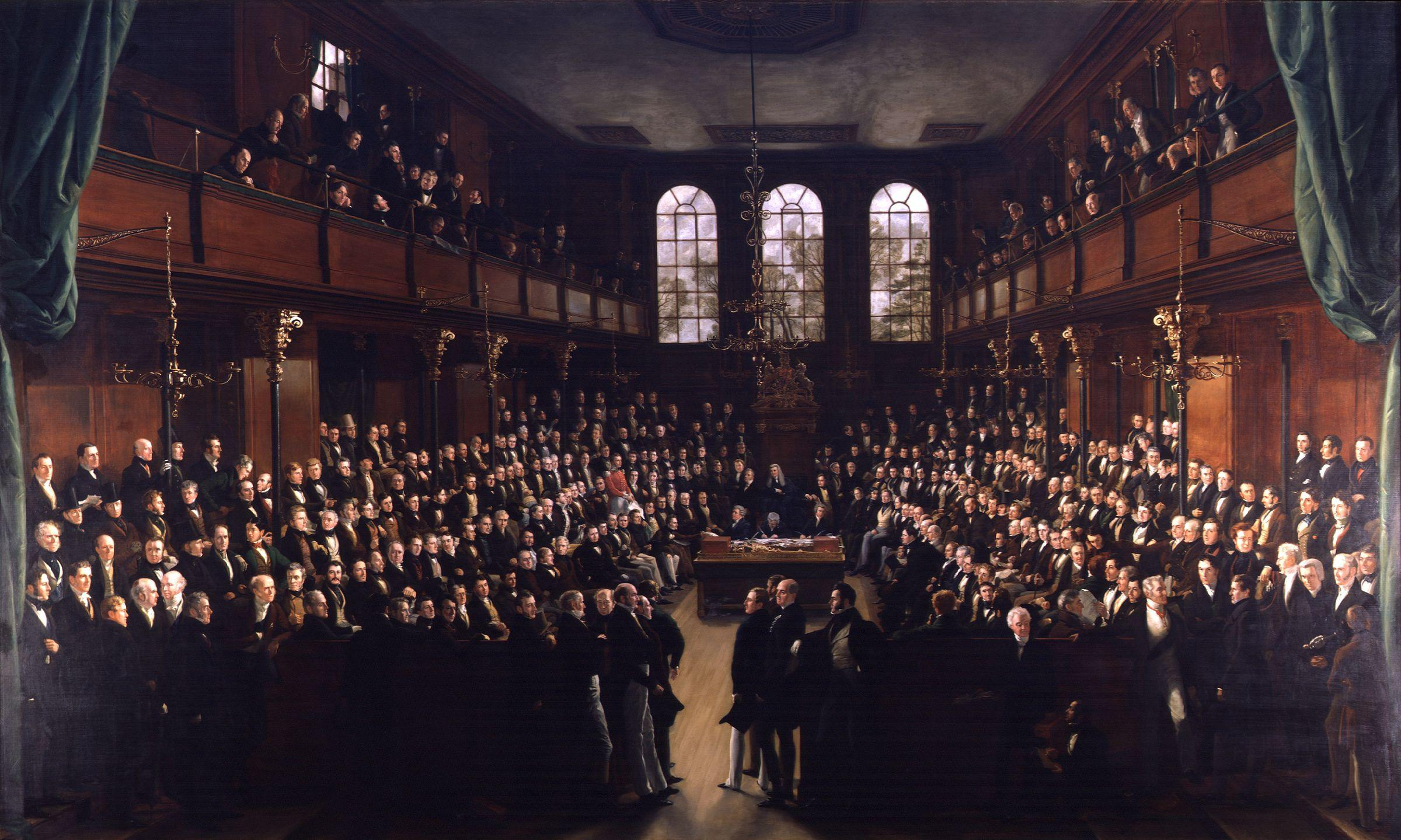
House of Commons by Sir George Hayter

John Edward Madocks (22 July 1786 – 20 November 1837) was a Welsh politician.

Madocks was educated at Harrow School and Christ Church, Oxford. He watched the hanging of John Bellingham with fellow pupil Lord Byron. He lived in Glan-y-wern in Denbighshire. In 1821, he served as High Sheriff of Denbighshire. He stood as a Whig in Denbigh Boroughs at the 1832 UK general election, winning the seat. In Parliament, he opposed electoral reforms, and also opposed monopolies and religious restrictions. He stood for re-election at the 1835 UK general election, but was defeated.

Madocks died on 20 November 1837 at his home, Glan-y-wern Hall in Llandyrnog, at the age of 51.

Parliament of the United Kingdom
Preceded by Robert Myddelton Biddulph	Member of Parliament for Denbigh Boroughs; 1832–1835	Succeeded by Wilson Jones
