= John Staunton Rochfort =

Anglo-Irish landowner and sheriff

Colonel John Staunton Rochfort (1763 – 6 May 1844) was an Anglo-Irish landowner and sheriff.

== Early life ==
Rochfort was born in Ireland in 1763. He was the eldest son of John Rochfort and Dorothea Burgh. Among his siblings were Anne Rochfort (who married Sir Matthew Blakiston, 2nd Baronet, heir of Sir Matthew Blakiston, 1st Baronet), and the Rev. Robert Rochfort (1775–1811), the notorious "Slashing Parson" of 1798.

His paternal grandparents Deborah Staunton (a daughter of Thomas Staunton) and John Rochfort, MP for Ballyshannon and for Mullingar. They lived in Clogrennane, County Carlow, and Newpark, County Dublin, His maternal grandparents were Thomas Burgh, MP for Lanesborough and Anne Downes. His maternal uncle was Thomas Burgh.

== Career ==
The Rochfort family estate included the lands of Newpark in Dublin, estates in County Westmeath and County Wexford. His primary estate was Clogrennane in County Carlow, which included the lands of Raheendoran, the ruins of Clogrennane Castle and Clogrennane Lodge. When in Dublin, they had a residence on Jervis Street and another on Ormond Quay. In Carlow, they had a residence on Dublin Street.

He served as High Sheriff of County Carlow in 1823.

=== Clogrennan House ===
Between 1806 and 1815, he built a new house in Clogrennane which had 52 rooms including 30 bedrooms, 33 fireplaces, 365 panes of glass and cost approximately £32,000. The house and estate were inherited by his eldest son, Horace. After his death in 1891, his descendants continued to own the house until they through their last ball in January 1922, shortly before the house was sold. Like the castle, it was later abandoned and has been roofless since 1945.

== Personal life ==
On 27 July 1801, he married Harriette Mann in Linton, Kent. She was a daughter of Sir Horatio Mann, 2nd Baronet and Lady Lucy Noel (a daughter of the 4th Earl of Gainsborough). Before her death in 1810, they were the parents of:

- Horace William Noel Rochfort (1809–1891), who married Frances Elizabeth Cosby, a daughter of Thomas Cosby, in 1837. After her death in 1841, he married Hon. Charlotte Hood, a daughter of Samuel Hood, 2nd Baron Bridport and Charlotte Hood, 3rd Duchess of Bronte, in 1845.

In 1814, he married Mary Burgh, a daughter of Anne Aigion and Thomas Burgh, MP. Together, they were the parents of:

- Dorothea Anne Rochfort (1815–1871), who married Hon. Henry Spencer Law, fifth son of the 1st Baron Ellenborough, in 1839.
- Anne Margaret Rochfort (b. 1821), who married Thomas Thoroton-Hildyard, MP for South Nottinghamshire who was a son of Col. Thomas Blackborne Thoroton-Hildyard of Flintham Hall and brother to Henry Hildyard.
- John Downes Rochfort (1825–1885), who married Ruth Herbert, a well-known stage actress.

Rochfort died on 6 May 1844 and was succeeded in his estate by his eldest son Horace. His second son, John, owned the Bawnboy estate in the parish of Templeport, in the barony of Tullyhaw, County Cavan.

=== Descendants ===
Through his daughter Dorothea, he was a grandfather of Edward Law, 5th Baron Ellenborough, and Cecil Law, 6th Baron Ellenborough.

Through his son Horace, he was a grandfather of Sir Alexander Nelson Rochfort (1850–1916), a Major-General in the Royal Artillery who served as Lieutenant-Governor of Jersey.

Through his daughter Anne, he was a grandfather of General Sir Henry Hildyard (1846–1916), and the great-grandfather of General Sir Reginald Hildyard (1876–1965).
