= Hildyard =

Hildyard is a surname. Notable people with the surname include:

- Sir Christopher Hilliard (1567–1634), also known as Christopher Hildyard, English landowner and politician
- Daisy Hildyard (born 1984), English novelist
- David Hildyard (sound engineer) (1916–2008), English sound engineer
- Henry Hildyard
  - Henry Hildyard (MP) (1610–1674), MP for Hedon in the 1660 Convention Parliament
  - Henry Hildyard (cricketer) (1824–1898), English first-class cricketer and clergyman
  - Henry Hildyard (1846–1916), British Army general
- Horatio Hildyard (1805–1886), English first-class cricketer and clergyman
- Jack Hildyard (1908–1990), British cinematographer
- James Hildyard (1809–1887), English classical scholar
- Katrine Hildyard (born 1970), Australian politician
- Lyonel Hildyard (1861–1931), English first-class cricketer
- Myles Thoroton Hildyard (1914–2005), English landowner, diarist and historian
- Nona Hildyard (1888-1915), New Zealand nurse
- Reginald Hildyard (1876–1965), British Army general
- Robert Hildyard (disambiguation), several people
- Thomas Thoroton-Hildyard (1821–1888), English politician
- William Hilliard (died 1608), also known as William Hildyard, English politician.
