= Horace William Noel Rochfort =

Anglo-Irish landowner and sheriff

Horace William Noel Rochfort JP DL (5 November 1809 – 16 May 1891) was an Anglo-Irish landowner and sheriff.

== Early life ==
Rochfort was born on 5 November 1809 into the prominent Rochfort family. He was the only son of Col. John Staunton Rochfort (1763–1844) and, his first wife, Harriette Mann. His father served as High Sheriff of County Carlow in 1823. After his mother's death in 1810, his father married Mary Burgh (a daughter of Thomas Burgh, MP), with whom he had three more children, Dorothea Anne Rochfort (wife of Hon. Henry Spencer Law, fifth son of the 1st Baron Ellenborough), Anne Margaret Rochfort (wife of Thomas Thoroton-Hildyard), and John Downes Rochfort (who married Louisa Ruther Herbert Maynard).

The Rochfort family first arrived in County Carlow when his great-great-grandfather, Robert Rochfort, bought 3,000 acres from the Butler family for his great-grandfather John Rochfort, High Sheriff of County Carlow in 1758. John was married to Dorothea Burgh (sister to Thomas Burgh, both children of Thomas Burgh, MP for Lanesborough). His maternal grandparents were Sir Horatio Mann, 2nd Baronet and Lady Lucy Noel (a daughter of the 4th Earl of Gainsborough).

== Career ==
Between 1806 and 1815, his father built a new house which had 52 rooms including 30 bedrooms, 33 fireplaces, 365 panes of glass and cost approximately £32,000. As the eldest son, he inherited his father's estate upon his death in 1844.

Rochfort was made Queen's Council in 1845. He served as High Sheriff of County Carlow in 1840 and High Sheriff of Queen's County in 1845. A Deputy Lieutenant and Justice of the Peace, Rochfort lived in the 15th century Clogrennane Castle, County Carlow, Ireland.

== Personal life ==
On 6 August 1837, he married Frances Elizabeth Cosby (1811–1841), a daughter of Thomas Cosby and Charlotte Elizabeth Kelly. Before her death on 25 March 1841, they were the parents of:

- John de Burgh Rochfort (1838–1908), a Lieutenant in the Royal Horse Artillery who married his stepmother's niece, Hilare Charlotte Hall, daughter of Hon. Catherine Louisa Hood and Henry Hall of Barton Abbey, in 1863.
- Horace William Rochfort (1839–1919), a captain in the Royal Navy who married Elizabeth Dalway, daughter of Marriott Robert Dalway, MP for Carrickfergus, in 1882.
- Thomas Francis Cosby Rochfort (1841–1901), a Colonel in the 4th European Light Cavalry who married Jane Alice Maddison Philpott, daughter of Richard Price Philpott and Emma Stapley Clowes, in 1889.

On 4 September 1845, he married Hon. Charlotte Hood, a daughter of Samuel Hood, 2nd Baron Bridport and Charlotte Hood, 3rd Duchess of Bronte. Together, they were the parents of:

- William Robert Hood Rochfort (1847–1940), who married Helen Blanche Palmer, daughter of Robert Samuel Palmer and Anna Maria Deane Spread, in 1875; he lived at Cahir Abbey.
- Sir Alexander Nelson Rochfort (1850–1916), a Major-General in the Royal Artillery who served as Lieutenant-Governor of Jersey.
- Amelia Catharine Rochfort (1851–1931), who married Thomas Pakenham Law, KC, son of Samuel Law and Sarah Pakenham, in 1871.

Rochfort died on 16 May 1891, at age 81, at 30 Upper Merion Street, Dublin, Ireland.
