= Joan Ayling =

British artist (1907–1993)

- Joan Ayling (1928) by Lafayette, National Portrait Gallery, London
- Born: Joan Eleanor Ayling; 16 September 1904; Edinburgh, Scotland
- Died: 1 July 1993 (age 88)
- Education: Kilburn Polytechnic; Birmingham School of Arts and Crafts; Slade School of Art
- Known for: Miniatures, painting, etching

Joan Eleanor Ayling, later Joan Eleanor Rees (16 September 1904 – 1 July 1993) was a British artist, notable for etching and painting miniature portraits.

== Early life and education ==
Ayling was born in Edinburgh, the daughter of John Ayling and Frances Augusta Laura Law Ayling. Her father was a printer and justice of the peace, who was imprisoned for forgery in 1907. Her maternal grandfather Thomas Graves Law was an English priest and a librarian at Edinburgh's Signet Library; through him she was also descended from cleric William Towry Law, judge Edward Law, 1st Baron Ellenborough, and politician Thomas Graves, 2nd Baron Graves.

Ayling was educated in England, at St Mary's in Mill Hill near London and subsequently at Kilburn Polytechnic. Ayling studied at Birmingham School of Arts and Crafts and then at the Slade School of Art in London. She also took private lessions in etching techniques with F L Griggs.

== Career ==
Ayling was known as a miniaturist. She exhibited a miniature at the Salon des Artistes Francais in 1939. In 1952 she won a silver medal at the Paris Salon and in 1957 was awarded a gold medal for her work from the same body. British art historian Raymond Lister considered her among "the best of all" miniaturists, and he included an example of her work in his 1953 book on the silhouette.

Ayling painted portraits of several notable individuals including Bertrand Russell, Edgar Evans, and a number of church leaders. As well as the Paris Salon, Ayling was a regular exhibitor at the Royal Academy, the Royal Society of British Artists and at the Walker Art Gallery in Liverpool. Her work was included in the exhibition Sladey Ladies, held at the Michael Parkin Gallery in 1986. She was a member of the Royal Society of Miniature Painters, Sculptors and Gravers and served a term as the society's vice president. She lived for many years in the Wembley area of London.

== Personal life ==
Ayling married Welsh physician Evan Robert Rees in 1936. Her husband died in 1981, and she died in 1993, at the age of 88.
