= William Barrow =

William Barrow may refer to:

- William Barrow (priest) (1754–1836), English Anglican Archdeacon of Nottingham, 1830–1832
- William Barrow (bishop) (died 1429), Bishop of Bangor and of Carlisle
- William Barrow (Jesuit) (1609–1679), English Jesuit
- William Barrow (chemist) (1904–1967), American chemist
- William Hodgson Barrow (1784–1876), English Conservative politician who sat in the House of Commons from 1851 to 1874

== See also ==
- William G. Barrows (1821–1886), justice of the Maine Supreme Judicial Court
