= Clogrennane Castle =

Ruined castle in County Carlow, Ireland

Coordinates: 52°48′34″N 6°57′57″W

- Caisleán Clogrennane
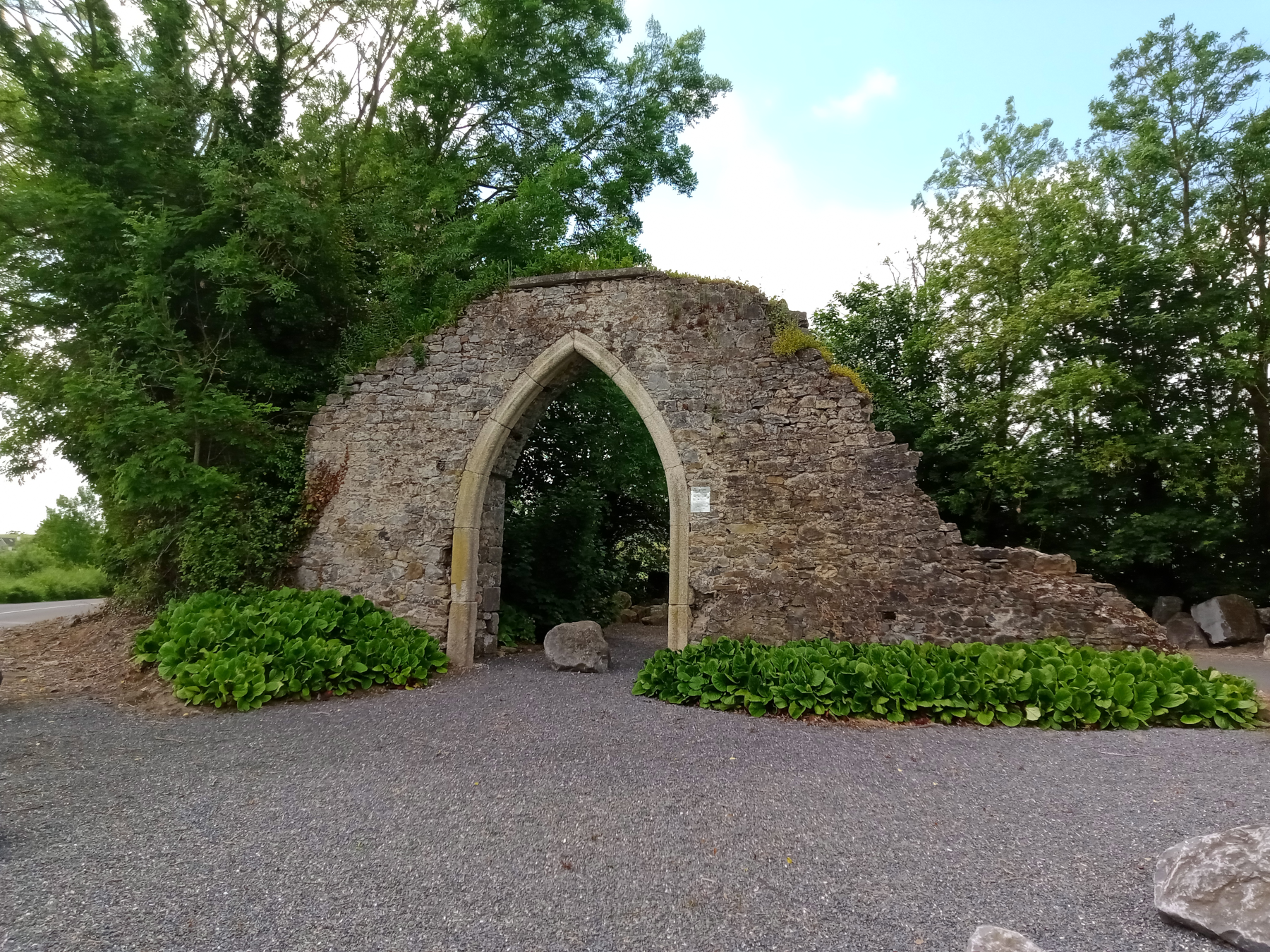
- Gothic archway of Clogrennane Castle
- Interactive map of the Clogrennane Castle area

General information
- Architectural style: Gothic
- Location: Clogrennane, County Carlow, Ireland
- Construction started: 15th century
- Client: Sir Edmund Butler

Clogrennane Castle (Note: Clogrennane Castle is sometimes referred to as: Cloughgrenan, Cloghgrennan, Gloughgrenane, Clogrennane, Clogrenan or Clogrennan.) is a ruined castle in County Carlow, Ireland, near Clogrennane, about two miles from Carlow on the River Barrow on the county border with County Laois.

== History ==
The Kavanaghs occupied the land since before the Norman invasion of Ireland until Dullough, the western part of the barony of Idrone, was sold to James Butler, 9th Earl of Ormond. (Note: The paternal grandparents of the 9th Earl of Ormond were Sir James Butler of Polestown and Princess Sabh Kavanagh, a daughter of the King of Leinster, Donal Reagh MacMurrough-Kavanagh (1396–1476).) Following his death in 1546, his second son Sir Edmund Butler inherited Dullogh.

=== Clogrennane Castle ===
The Castle was built by Sir Edmund sometime in the 15th century to defend an area along the River Barrow and the extensive woodlands along the side of Killeshin hill. The castle withstood a siege from Sir Peter Carew, who attempted to claim the land in right of his ancestors, in 1568. Sir Edmund participated in the revolt against the Tudors, which led to him being attainted by Queen Elizabeth I. After he surrendered his estate to the Queen in 1570, the Queen pardoned him in 1573, but did not remove the attainder. After Edmund's death in c. 1585, Elizabeth reversed the attainder on his eldest son Piers, who was granted ancestral lands in Roscrea, County Tipperary. Both Piers and his brother, James Butler, were executed at Thurles by their uncle, Thomas Butler, 10th Earl of Ormond, during Tyrone's Rebellion in 1596.

In 1602, Elizabeth also reversed the attainder on Sir Edmund's last remaining legitimate son, (Note: Sir Edmund was also survived by an illegitimate son, Thomas Butler, who was made a Baronet of Cloughrenan by King Charles I in 1628.) Theobald, the heir presumptive to his uncle's earldom of Ormond. Theoboald was created 1st Viscount Butler of Tulleophelim in 1603, immediately before marrying his first cousin, Lady Elizabeth Butler, the only surviving child of the 10th Earl of Ormond, in a marriage the Earl made to avoid splitting his inheritance between his daughter, Lady Elizabeth, and his heir, Theobald. Viscount Butler, however, predeceased the Earl, dying without issue in 1613. His widow, who inherited his considerable debts, married Sir Richard Preston, Lord Dingwall (a favourite of the King) the following year, shortly before her father's death. Sir Richard was created Earl of Desmond in 1619. (Note: The earldom of Desmond had been forfeited in 1582 after the failure of the Second Desmond Rebellion against Queen Elizabeth I. Sir Edmund and his brother, Thomas, 10th Earl of Ormond, were the eldest sons of Lady Joan Fitzgerald (a daughter of James FitzGerald, 10th Earl of Desmond, she married Gerald FitzGerald, 14th Earl of Desmond after the death of their father, the 9th Earl of Ormond). The marriage of Lady Joan and the 14th Earl of Desmond brought a period of peace between the FitzGeralds and the Butlers, who were hereditary enemies.) Since the next in line, the 10th Earl's younger brother John, had died in 1570, the earldom passed to John's son, Walter Butler, who became the 11th Earl of Ormond. King James I awarded most of the Ormond estate, including Kilkenny Castle, to Lady Elizabeth, as they were Protestants and the 11th Earl was a devout Catholic. The 11th Earl contested the King's decision and was detained in the Fleet Prison from 1619 until 1625, when he submitted to the King's ruling. The Ormond estate was eventually reunited when Lady Elizabeth's only child, Lady Elizabeth Preston, married the 11th Earl's Protestant grandson and heir, James Butler (son of the 11th Earl's eldest son, Thomas Butler, Viscount Thurles, who had died in 1619), in 1629. James inherited the earldom of Ormond in 1634 before being created Marquess of Ormond in 1642 and Duke of Ormond in 1661.

The Butlers remained in possession of Clogrennane until 1715, when James Butler, 2nd Duke of Ormonde was attainted after being accused of supporting the Jacobite rising of 1715. The castle, which by then was in ruins, and 3,000 acres in County Carlow were purchased by Robert Rochfort from the Butler family for Rochfort's second son, John Rochfort. John, who served as High Sheriff of County Carlow in 1758, married Dorothea Burgh (sister to Thomas Burgh, both children of Thomas Burgh, MP for Lanesborough).

=== Clogrennan House ===
John Rochfort's son, Col. John Staunton Rochfort, built Clogrennan House, also called Clogrennan Hall, in c. 1815, which converted the entrance of the castle into the newly built House. The house and estate were inherited by his son, Horace William Noel Rochfort. (Note: Horace William Noel Rochfort (1809–1891) married, as his second wife, the Hon. Charlotte Hood 1845. She was a daughter of Samuel Hood, 2nd Baron Bridport and Charlotte Hood, 3rd Duchess of Bronte. Horace and Charlotte were the parents of William Robert Hood Rochfort (who lived at Cahir Abbey), Major-General Sir Alexander Nelson Rochfort of the Royal Artillery who served as Lieutenant-Governor of Jersey, and Amelia Catharine Rochfort (who married Thomas Pakenham Law, KC).) Both father and son served as High Sheriffs of County Carlow. After his death in 1891, his descendants continued to own the house until they through their last ball in January 1922, shortly before the house was sold. Like the castle, it was later abandoned and has been roofless since 1945.

== Artist renderings ==
- 1680, drawing by Thomas Dineley shows a five floor house featuring three decorative gables at front and crenellated parapet at sides.
- 1790 sketch shows ruins similar to conditions seen in 1870 photographs.
- Between 1890 and 1920, artist J.S. Fleming made a pen and ink drawing of the ruins of Clogrennane Castle.

== See also ==
- List of country houses in County Carlow
