= George Stanhope, 7th Earl of Chesterfield =

British soldier and Conservative politician (1831-1871)

The Right Honourable The Earl of Chesterfield
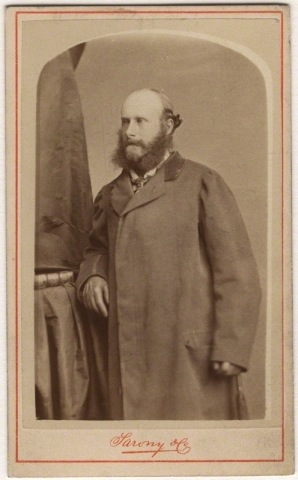

Member of Parliament for Nottinghamshire South
- In office 1860–1866 Serving with William Hodgson Barrow
- Preceded by: William Hodgson Barrow; Viscount Newark
- Succeeded by: William Hodgson Barrow; Thomas Thoroton-Hildyard

Personal details
- Born: 28 September 1831
- Died: 1 December 1871 (aged 40)
- Parent(s): George Stanhope, 6th Earl of Chesterfield; Hon. Anne Elizabeth Weld-Forester

George Philip Cecil Arthur Stanhope, 7th Earl of Chesterfield (28 September 1831 – 1 December 1871), styled Lord Stanhope until 1866, was a British soldier, and Conservative politician who sat in the House of Commons from 1860 until 1866 when he inherited his peerage and sat in the House of Lords. He was a cricketer who played first-class cricket for Nottinghamshire and was the first president of Derbyshire County Cricket Club.

== Early life ==
Chesterfield was the only son of George Stanhope, 6th Earl of Chesterfield, and the Hon. Anne Elizabeth Weld-Forester, daughter of Cecil Weld-Forester, 1st Baron Forester.

He was educated at Eton. He played club cricket for I Zingari and for Old Etonians in 1851.

== Career ==
Chesterfield entered the British Army and achieved the rank of lieutenant in the Royal Horse Guards. He retired in 1855. In 1860 he was elected at a by-election as Member of Parliament (MP) for Nottinghamshire South, a seat he held until 1866, when he succeeded his father in the earldom and took his seat in the House of Lords.

=== Cricket ===
Lord Chesterfield was one of the pioneers of Derbyshire cricket. In 1857 and in 1859 played for a pre-county Derbyshire side against All England XIs. He also played for I Zingari.

In 1860 Chesterfield played first-class cricket for Gentlemen of the North and for Nottinghamshire. He also played for Nottingham and All England XIs. In 1861 he played first-class matches again for Northern Gent's and Nottinghamshire. He also turned out for Marylebone Cricket Club and Gentlemen of the Midland Counties.

Chesterfield played ten innings in five first-class matches with an average of 13.50 and a top score of 65.

In 1870 Chesterfield was one of the founders of Derbyshire County Cricket Club and became the club's first president.

== Personal life ==
In November 1871 Lord Chesterfield stayed at Londesborough Lodge, Scarborough, home to the Earl and Countess of Londesborough with, among others, the Prince of Wales. Chesterfield, the Prince and the Prince's groom contracted typhoid fever from poor plumbing. The Prince recovered while Lord Chesterfield and the Prince's groom both died from the illness. He was unmarried and was succeeded in the earldom by his third cousin, George Stanhope.

Parliament of the United Kingdom
Preceded by William Hodgson Barrow; Viscount Newark	Member of Parliament for Nottinghamshire South; 1860–1866; With: William Hodgson Barrow	Succeeded by William Hodgson Barrow; Thomas Thoroton-Hildyard
Peerage of England
Preceded by George Stanhope	Earl of Chesterfield; 1866–1871	Succeeded by George Philip Stanhope
