= Robert Hildyard =

Robert Hildyard may refer to:

- Sir Robert Hildyard, 1st Baronet (1612–1685), of the Hildyard baronets
- Sir Robert Hildyard, 2nd Baronet (1671–1729), English landowner and member of parliament (MP) for Hedon
- Sir Robert Hildyard, 3rd Baronet (1716–1781), MP for Great Bedwyn
- Sir Robert D’Arcy Hildyard, 4th Baronet (1743–1814), of the Hildyard baronets
- Robert Hildyard (MP for Whitehaven) (1800–1857), British Conservative politician
- Robert Hildyard (judge) (born 1952), judge of the High Court of England and Wales

== See also ==
- Hildyard, surname
