= William Barrow (priest) =

English churchman and archdeacon

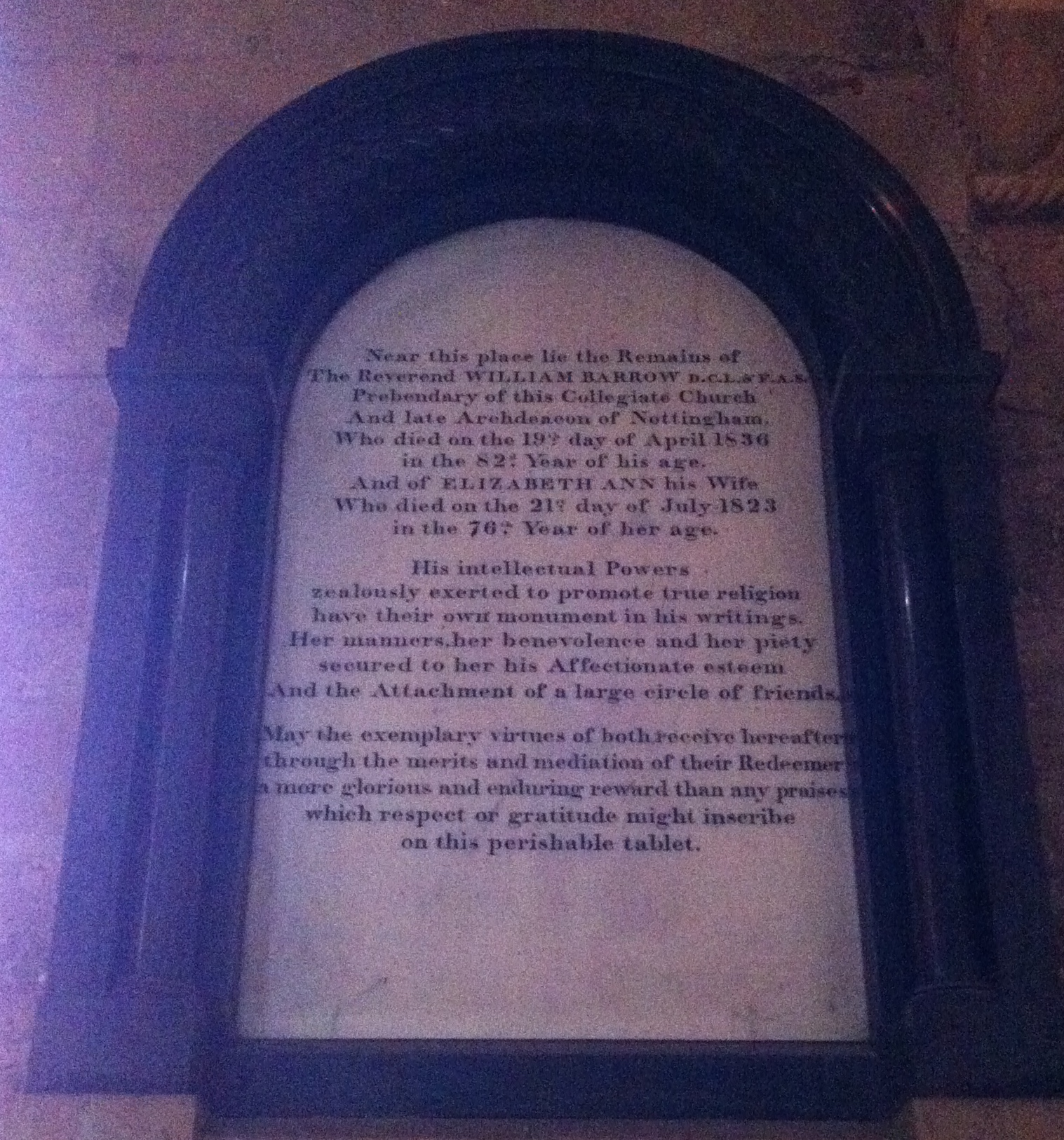
- Memorial in Southwell Minster
- Born: 1754
- Died: 1836 (aged 81–82)

William Barrow (1754 – 1836) was an English churchman, who served as archdeacon of Nottingham from 1830 to 1832.

== Life ==
From a Westmorland family, he went to Queen's College, Oxford, where in 1778 he gained the chancellor's English essay prize on academic education. This essay was afterwards enlarged and published as An Essay on Education; in which are particularly considered the Merits and the Defects of the Discipline and Instruction in our Academies, in two volumes, 1802 (and again in 1804). In 1799 he took the degree of DCL.

He preached as the Bampton lecturer for 1799, on Answers to some Popular Objections against the Necessity or the Credibility of the Christian Revelation. He was indebted to William Paley's writings for the argument; he popularised arguments for the necessity and probability of a divine revelation to man, that the doctrines and precepts of the Christian religion are favourable to the enjoyments of the present life, and, with regard to prayer, deemed it probable that "the Almighty in consequence of our prayers interferes with the laws of nature".

His brother Richard was vicar-choral of Southwell (a post which he held for 64 years), and in 1815 Barrow himself became prebendary of Eaton in the Collegiate Church of Southwell. In 1821 he was vicar-general of the same church, and was appointed on 3 April 1830 Archdeacon of Nottingham. This was not separated at that time from the province of York, and was held by Barrow for two years, until age and infirmity caused him to resign it to Dr. George Wilkins in 1832.

Barrow married Mrs. E. A. Williams, who died childless in 1823. He died 19 April 1836, aged 82. There is a tablet to his memory in the nave of Southwell Minster. His nephew William Hodgson Barrow was for many years M.P. for South Nottinghamshire.

== Works ==
Barrow was a Fellow of the Society of Antiquaries. He also published two sermons which had been preached at Southwell before the loyal volunteers of that place during the panic of 1803–4, and another on Pecuniary Contributions for the Diffusion of Religious Knowledge; a treatise on the Expediency of translating our Scriptures into several of the Oriental Languages and the means of rendering those Translations useful (1808), Familiar Dissertations on Theological and Moral Subjects (1819), and three volumes of Familiar Sermons (1818–21).
