= Lancelot Rolleston =

British politician

- Born: 20 July 1785
- Died: May 18, 1862 (aged 76); Brighton
- Resting place: St Mary's Church, Greasley, Nottinghamshire
- Spouses: Caroline Chetwynd (m. 17 November 1808–10 March 1844); Eleanor Charlotte Fraser (m. 31 October 1846-18 May 1862)
- Parents: Christopher Rolleston (father); Anne Nicholas (mother)

Lancelot Rolleston (20 July 1785 – 18 May 1862) of Watnall Hall, Nottinghamshire, was a British Conservative Party politician.

He was the eldest son of Christopher Rolleston of Watnall Hall by Anne, daughter of Captain Nicholas, Royal Navy. He married, firstly, Caroline, only daughter of Sir George Chetwynd, Baronet, by whom he had several children, and secondly, Eleanor Charlotte, daughter of Robert Fraser of Torbreck, Inverness-shire, by whom he had further children. (Note: His wives were: Caroline Chetwynd (4 June 1786 - 10 March 1844); Eleanor Charlotte Fraser (bap 30 September 1815 - 2 June 1894))

He was appointed Colonel of the disembodied Royal Sherwood Foresters Militia on 11 April 1833, and retained the position when the regiment was reformed in 1852, when he commanded it during its initial training periods. It was embodied for home defence duties in the Crimean War and Indian Mutiny, although the command was exercised by younger officers.

He was elected unopposed as a member of parliament (MP) for Southern division of Nottinghamshire at the 1837 general election. He was re-elected unopposed in 1841 and 1847, and resigned from the House of Commons in 1849 by the procedural device of accepting the post of Steward of the Chiltern Hundreds.

He died at Brighton on 18 May 1862 and was buried in St Mary's Church, Greasley, Nottinghamshire. (Note: Watnall Hall passed to his son, Sir Lancelot Rolleston (19 August 1847 – 29 March 1941).)

His daughter Charlotte Frances Anne Rolleston (died January 1853) was married on 11 April 1840 to the Whig politician George Heneage.

== Notes ==
Parliament of the United Kingdom
Preceded by Evelyn Denison; Earl of Lincoln	Member of Parliament for South Nottinghamshire; 1837 – 1849; With: Earl of Lincoln to 1846; Thomas Thoroton-Hildyard from 1846	Succeeded by Robert Bromley; Thomas Thoroton-Hildyard
