= Listed buildings in Flintham =

Flintham is a civil parish in the Rushcliffe district of Nottinghamshire, England. The parish contains 38 listed buildings that are recorded in the National Heritage List for England. Of these, two are listed at Grade I, the highest of the three grades, and the others are at Grade II, the lowest grade. The parish contains the village of Flintham and the surrounding area. The most important buildings in the parish are a church and the country house, Flintham Hall, which are both listed at Grade I. A number of structures associated with the hall are listed, and the other listed buildings consist of houses, cottages and associated structures, farmhouses and farm buildings, a pinfold, a former school and a telephone kiosk.

== Key ==
Grade	Criteria
I	Buildings of exceptional interest, sometimes considered to be internationally important
II	Buildings of national importance and special interest

== Buildings ==
Name and location	Photograph	Date	Notes	Grade
St Augustine's Church; 53.00721°N 0.90045°W		11th century	The church has been altered and extended through the centuries, it was restored in 1827–28, and in 1895–96 by C. Hodgson Fowler. The church is built in stone with roofs of lead and slate, and consists of a nave, a chancel, and a tower at the crossing. The tower has a single stage, a chamfered plinth, quoins, moulded eaves, a coped parapet, and a pyramidal roof with a finial and a weathercock. On the west side is a canted bell turret with moulded eaves and a conical roof.	I
Manor Farmhouse and farm buildings 53.00590°N 0.89601°W		Late 16th century	Buildings were added and altered through the centuries. The farmhouse has a timber framed core, and the buildings are in brick and stone, partly rendered, on stone plinths, with floor bands, cogged and dentilled eaves, some exposed close studded timber farming, and roofs with coped gables. The farmhouse has two storeys, and a T-shaped plan with a front of three bays. The windows are a mix of sashes and casements. To the right of the farmhouse is a single-storey three-bay stable and cartshed, and a pigeoncote with two square openings.	II
Flintham Hall and terrace wall 53.00720°N 0.90108°W		17th century	A country house that was largely rebuilt in 1798, altered by Lewis Wyatt in 1829, and remodelled from 1853 by T. C. Hine. It is in Italianate style, the rear is in brick, the other fronts are encased in brick, and the roofs are slated. The house is in two and three storeys, and has fronts of eleven and three bays. In the centre of the west front is a tower porch with a porte cochère, and a turret with filigree ironwork and a wind vane. On the south front is a three-storey block, and to the right is a canted turret, a two-storey library block, and a full height conservatory with a cast iron barrel vault.	I
Raspberry Cottage; 53.00536°N 0.89453°W	—	Late 17th century	The cottage has a timber framed core, it is encased in stone and brick and whitewashed, and a wing was added in the late 19th century. There is a single storey and attics, and an L-shaped plan with fronts of two and three bays. On the street front is a doorway flanked by horizontally-sliding sash windows, and in the attic is a sloping dormer, and there are similar windows in the wing. On the east and south fronts are continuous glazed porches.	II
The Mowbray; 53.00372°N 0.89111°W	—	c. 1700	A stone cottage with brick dressings, corbelled eaves, and a pantile roof with tumbled gables. There is a single storey with attics, three bays, and a continuous rear outshut facing the street. The windows in the south front are horizontally-sliding sashes, and in the outshut they are casements.	II
Farm buildings and pigeoncote, College Farm; 53.00656°N 0.89579°W	—	Early 18th century	The farm buildings are in brick, stone, concrete and mud, they have pantile roofs, and were built at various dates. The buildings are in one and two storeys, and form a C-shaped plan around three sides of a courtyard. At the northeast is a barn with three bays, and to its right is a single-bay cowshed. In the southeast range is a cowshed with five bays, and to its right is a stable. Further to the right is a two-storey stable and a pigeoncote, and elsewhere are more stables.	II
Thatch Cottage and outbuildings 53.00536°N 0.89391°W		Early 18th century	The cottage is partly timber framed with brick nogging and partly in brick, on plinths, and the thatched roof has been replaced by pantiles and has coped gables with kneelers. There are two storeys and two bays, the left bay facing the street is gabled. On the east side is a lean-to porch above which is a sloping dormer, and the other windows vary. At the rear are a toilet, a shed and a cartshed.	II
Tundyleas Farmhouse and outbuilding 53.00612°N 0.89582°W	—	Early 18th century	The farmhouse is in brick and stone on a plinth, the rear wing timber framed, and it has rebated eaves and a pantile roof. There are two storeys, an L-shaped plan, a front of two bays, and a rear wing. The doorway has a segmental head, and the windows are a mix of casements and sashes, some horizontally-sliding. Adjoining the house are single-storey stables and a pigsty.	II
Ivy Cottage; 53.00555°N 0.89806°W		Mid 18th century	The cottage is in brick with stone dressings, dentilled eaves and a pantile roof. There is a single storey and attics, and three bays. On the front are two doorways, most of the windows are casements, and most of the openings have segmental heads. In the roof are a sloping dormer flanked by two gabled dormers.	II
Netherfield Cottage; 53.00541°N 0.89469°W	—	Mid 18th century	A house in brick and stone, on plinths, with stone dressings quoins, cogged and dentilled eaves, and pantile roofs with coped gables. There are two storeys and six unequal bays. The windows are a mix of casements and horizontally-sliding sashes, most with segmental heads.	II
Sundial, Flintham Hall; 53.00668°N 0.90069°W	—	1772	The sundial in the grounds of the hall is in stone, and has a square plinth and a moulded round base. On this is a baluster-shaped stem with a moulded cap. On the top is a double-sided bronze dial with an inscription and the date.	II
College Farmhouse, outbuilding, wall and pump 53.00630°N 0.89641°W		Late 18th century	The farmhouse is in brick with a partial plinth, cogged eaves, and a pantile roof with coped gables and kneelers. There are two storeys and an L-shaped plan, with a front range of three bays, and a rear wing. In the centre is a doorway with moulded jambs and a segmental fanlight. The windows on the front are sashes, those in the ground floor with segmental heads, and in the rear wing are casement windows. Adjoining is a lower two-storey outbuilding with dentilled eaves, a door with a segmental head, and casement windows. Outside there is a lead pump with a timber case and a fluted spout, and two plain stone troughs. The boundary wall is in brick with flat and gabled coping, containing four chamfered brick piers with pyramidal stone caps.	II
Flintham House and wall 53.00626°N 0.89735°W	—	Late 18th century	A farmhouse in brick, partly rendered, on a plinth, with a floor band, half-round brick eaves, and a roof of tile and pantile with coped gables and kneelers. There are two storeys and an L-shaped plan, with a front range of three bays, and a rear wing. In the centre of the east front is a doorway with a reeded surround, and an open pediment on reeded brackets. The windows on the front are sashes, and elsewhere there are casement windows and horizontally-sliding sash windows. On the south front is a doorway with a hood on curved brackets and a bay window. The boundary wall is in brick with ramped slab coping and it contains a square pier and a doorway.	II
Stable range, Flintham House; 53.00626°N 0.89759°W	—	Late 18th century	The stable range is in brick with dentilled eaves and a pantile roof. There are two storeys and eight bays. In the ground floor are doorways, windows, stable doorways and a carriage doorway with segmental or elliptical heads, and oval openings. The upper floor contains casement windows. On the roof is an iron wind vane.	II
Water pump and trough, The Old Bakehouse; 53.00643°N 0.89698°W	—	Late 18th century	The water pump at the rear of the farmhouse has a wooden case. The pump is in lead, and has a straight iron handle with an oval knob. In front of it is a square stone trough on a brick plinth.	II
The Old Bakehouse; 53.00640°N 0.89708°W	—	1778	A farmhouse in brick, with a floor band, cogged eaves, and a pantile roof with coped gables. There are two storeys and attics, and an L-shaped plan, with a front range of three bays, and a later lean-to. In the centre is a doorway with a reeded surround, a semicircular fanlight, and an open pediment on curved brackets. The windows are casements with segmental rubbed brick heads. On the northwest front are two oriel windows, and in the southeast gable is an initialled datestone.	II
Barn, The Old Bakehouse; 53.00654°N 0.89664°W	—	1778	The barn is in brick with rebated eaves and a pantile roof. There is a single storey and three bays. The openings include doorways, some with segmental heads, an oval opening and vents, and there is an initialled datestone.	II
Urn southwest of Flintham Hall; 53.00704°N 0.90186°W	—	1784	The urn in the garden of the hall is in stone on a stepped square plinth. It is egg-shaped with a tapered stem and a gadrooned bowl. The cover has an artichoke finial and foliate swags, and on the urn are a pair of ornate horseshoe handles and four lion masks.	II
Urn west of Flintham Hall; 53.00721°N 0.90174°W	—	1784	The urn in the garden of the hall is in stone on a stepped square plinth. It is egg-shaped with a tapered stem and a gadrooned bowl. The cover has an artichoke finial and foliate swags, and on the urn are a pair of ornate horseshoe handles and four lion masks.	II
Garden House, walls and potting sheds, Flintham Hall; 53.00651°N 0.89970°W	—	1798	The garden house is in brick and stone on a plinth, and has a coped parapet and a roof of tile, pantile and slate. There are two storeys, two bays, and a later extension. It contains a doorway with a fanlight, and sash windows. The adjoining garden walls were heated, they have blocked fire holes, and form a rectangular plan. The walls contain doorways with segmental heads, and attached to the north wall is a lean-to greenhouse. On the north side is a potting shed with ten bays, containing horizontally-sliding sash windows with segmental heads.	II
Bakery Farmhouse and farm buildings 53.00557°N 0.89465°W		Early 19th century	The farmhouse is in brick on a plinth, with stone dressings, cogged and rebated eaves, and a pantile roof with coped gables and kneelers. There are two storeys and three bays, and a rear wing. In the centre is a doorway with panelled pilasters, a fanlight, and a hood on moulded brackets. The windows are horizontally-sliding sashes, those in the ground floor with segmental heads. To the north is a stable range, the openings with elliptical heads.	II
Dolphins; 53.00666°N 0.89780°W	—	Early 19th century	The house is in brick on a rendered plinth, with rebated eaves, and a pantile roof with coped gables. There are two storeys and an L-shaped plan, with a front range of three bays. The central round-headed doorway has pilasters, a semicircular fanlight and a bracketed pediment, and the windows are sashes. On the northwest front is a sloping dormer.	II
Ice house, Flintham Hall; 53.00889°N 0.90669°W	—	Early 19th century	The ice house is in brick, and partly rendered. The tunnel entrance is damaged, the chamber is cylindrical with a domed top, and is about 3 metres (9.8 ft) in diameter.	II
Forge Cottage; 53.00642°N 0.89743°W		Early 19th century	A house in brick with stone dressings, dentilled eaves and a pantile roof. There are two storeys and an L-shaped plan with a front range of two bays, and a large later rear extension. The central doorway has moulded jambs, and the windows on the front are sashes. Elsewhere, there are casement windows and a horizontally-sliding sash window.	II
Home Farmhouse and farm buildings 53.00539°N 0.89871°W	—	Early 19th century	The farmhouse and adjoining stables are in brick and stone on a plinth, with rebated eaves, and roofs in pantile and slate with pedimented gables. They are in one and two storeys and form a T-shaped plan, with fronts of five and three bays. Attached to the house is a single-storey wash-house with a hipped roof. Most of the windows are horizontally-sliding sashes with segmental heads, and there are also casement windows.	II
Pinfold; 53.00364°N 0.88897°W		Early 19th century	The pinfold is in brick with brick coping. It has a circular plan, and contains a pair of square brick piers and a wooden gate.	II
Stables, forge, water pump and wall, Flintham Hall; 53.00778°N 0.90063°W	—	c. 1829	The stable range was designed by Lewis Wyatt, and is in brick, partly rendered on rendered plinths, with slate roofs. It forms a C-shaped plan with ranges of seven and ten bays. Most of the windows are sashes, and most of the openings have segmental heads. In the southwest end is a re-sited 17th-century doorcase with an eared architrave, scroll brackets and a broken pediment. The northeast range has a central two-storey bay containing an elliptical-headed carriage entrance, and above it is an octagonal cupola with elliptical headed openings, an ogee lead dome, and a wind vane. By it, is a timber-cased lead pump with a cranked handle and a half-round stone trough;, the cistern is dated. The forge has five bays, and the boundary wall is in brick with slab coping, an L-shaped plan, it contains three square piers, and extends for about 60 metres (200 ft).	II
The Old Vicarage and outbuilding 53.00702°N 0.89994°W		c. 1830	The vicarage, later a private house, is in brick with rebated eaves and a hipped slate roof. There are two and three storeys, a front of four bays, and a rear wing on a stone plinth. The doorway has a moulded surround and a fanlight. Most of the windows are sashes, those on the front with splayed rusticated lintels, and elsewhere with segmental heads. Adjoining the house is a single-storey two-bay outbuilding with a casement window, and a porch with a hood on brackets.	II
Aviaries and wall, Flintham Hall; 53.00563°N 0.89983°W	—	Mid 19th century	The aviaries are in brick, with rebated and soffited eaves, ramped slab coping, and hipped slate roofs. There are nine bays, the middle two bays project and are canted with two storeys, the upper storey containing pigeon holes, over which is a pyramidal vent with a lead roof. This is flanked by single-storey wings ending in square pavilions. All the openings have elliptical heads. The adjoining walls are in brick with ramped slab coping, and extend for about 200 metres (660 ft).	II
Fountain, Flintham Hall; 53.00689°N 0.90148°W	—	Mid 19th century	The fountain in the grounds of the hall is in stone, and has a moulded square basin with four half-round lobes. The bowl has four mask spouts, and in the centre is a swagged spout with a moulded base.	II
Service wing, bakehouse, cartshed, stable and water pump, Flintham Hall; 53.00748°N 0.90059°W	—	Mid 19th century	The service buildings are in brick on stone plinths, with stone dressings, a parapet and slate roofs. There is a single storey and an L-shaped plan, with fronts of 18 and ten bays. The windows are casements, and most openings have segmental heads. In the courtyard is a lead pump with a timber case, a cranked handle and a spout with a brass tap, and a large octagonal stone bowl on a plinth.	II
West Lodge, Flintham Hall; 53.01172°N 0.90693°W		c. 1853	The lodge was designed by T. C. Hine, and is in stone on a chamfered plinth, with a string course, coped parapets, and a tile roof with shouldered ogee gables. There is a single storey, a T-shaped plan, and a front of three bays. Most of the windows are mullioned casements. In the northeast and northwest fronts are gabled bays containing a parapeted bay window, above which is a quatrefoil with a sculpted cockerel. In an angle is a porch with a moulded round-headed doorway.	II
Keeper's Lodge; 52.99937°N 0.90342°W		1855	The lodge was designed by T. C. Hine, and is in brick with stone dressings, on a chamfered plinth, with half-round brick eaves, and a tile roof with pedimented gables. There are two storeys and three bays, and most of the windows are chamfered mullioned casements. In the centre of the east front is a hipped canted bay window, and in the angle is a porch with a hipped roof.	II
Tree Lodge; 53.00968°N 0.89966°W	—	c. 1855	The lodge was designed by T. C. Hine, and is in brick with stone dressings, on a chamfered plinth, with half-round brick eaves, and a tile roof with pedimented gables. There are two storeys and three bays, and a T-shaped plan. Most of the windows are chamfered mullioned casements. In the centre of the northeast front is a hipped canted bay window, and in the angle is a porch with a hipped roof and a balustrade.	II
Kennels, Flintham Hall; 52.99983°N 0.90437°W	—	c. 1857	The kennels in the park are in brick with stone dressings, half-round brick eaves and tile roofs. There is a single storey, and an H-shaped plan, with five bays, and projecting gabled wings at each end containing a round-headed window. The kennels have doorways with shouldered heads, quatrefoil openings, and unglazed windows with chamfered surrounds. Outside are brick walls with stone coping and iron railings.	II
Old School House; 53.00741°N 0.89822°W		1873	The school, later used for other purposes, is in brick, with stone dressings, rebated eaves, and a pantile roof with coped gables. There is a single range, with a lean-to addition to the northwest. Most of the windows are casements, there is a horizontally-sliding sash, and all the openings have segmental heads. On the gable end is a shaped re-sited inscribed plaque with a coat of arms, and on the roof is a gabled bellcote on a dentilled corbel, with a round-headed opening.	II
Telephone kiosk 53.00630°N 0.89681°W		1935	The K6 type telephone kiosk in Main Street was designed by Giles Gilbert Scott. Constructed in cast iron with a square plan and a dome, it has three unperforated crowns in the top panels.	II
Boundary wall, St Augustine's Church; 53.00685°N 0.90045°W	—	Undated	The wall at the boundary of the churchyard is in brick and stone, with coping in brick and stone. The entrance to the churchyard is flanked by square brick piers with stone coping, and between them is a pair of iron gates. The wall extends for about 120 metres (390 ft).	II
