= George Storer =

English Member of Parliament (1814–1888)

George Storer (10 September 1814 – 18 March 1888) was an English Conservative Party politician who sat in the House of Commons from 1874 to 1885.

Storer was the son of Rev. John Storer of Hawksworth, Nottinghamshire and his wife Charlotte Wylde, daughter of Rev. C Wylde rector of St Nicholas Nottingham. He was educated at Louth Grammar School and St John's College, Cambridge. He was a captain in the Leicestershire (Belvoir) Rifle Volunteers and a J.P. for Nottinghamshire.

At the 1874 general election Storer was elected unopposed as a member of parliament (MP) for Nottinghamshire South. He was re-elected in 1880 and held the seat until the 1885 general election, when the constituency was abolished by the Redistribution of Seats Act 1885.

Storer died at the age of 73.

Storer married in 1859 Harriette Anne Manson, daughter of Moffat Palmer of Horncastle and widow of D Manson of Spyrie.

Parliament of the United Kingdom
Preceded by William Hodgson Barrow; Thomas Thoroton-Hildyard	Member of Parliament for South Nottinghamshire; 1874 – 1885; With: Thomas Thoroton-Hildyard	Constituency abolished
