= Robert Bromley (MP) =

British politician

Robert Bromley (1815 – 30 December 1850) was a British Conservative Party politician, the eldest son and heir apparent of Admiral Sir Robert Howe Bromley, 3rd Baronet.

He was elected unopposed as a member of parliament (MP) for Southern division of Nottinghamshire at a by-election in April 1849 after the resignation of the Conservative MP Lancelot Rolleston. He died in office on 30 December 1850, aged 35, after less than two years in the House of Commons.

Parliament of the United Kingdom
Preceded by Lancelot Rolleston; Thomas Thoroton-Hildyard	Member of Parliament for South Nottinghamshire; 1849–1850; With: Thomas Thoroton-Hildyard	Succeeded by William Hodgson Barrow; Thomas Thoroton-Hildyard
