= Sydney Pierrepont, 3rd Earl Manvers =

British hereditary peer and politician (1826-1900)

The Earl Manvers
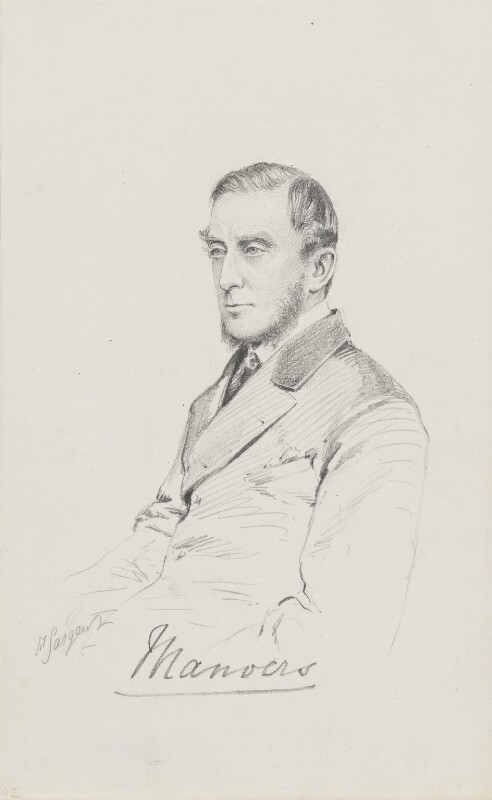

Member of Parliament for South Nottinghamshire
- In office 1852–1860

Personal details
- Born: 12 April 1826
- Died: 16 January 1900 (aged 73)
- Spouse: Georgine Jane Elizabeth Fanny de Franquetot
- Children: Emily Annora Charlotte Pierrepont; Charles William Sydney Pierrepont, 4th Earl Manvers; Evelyn Henry Pierrepont; Henry Sydney Pierrepont; Mary Augusta Pierrepont

Military service
- Allegiance: Great Britain
- Branch/service: British Army
- Years of service: 1851–1900
- Rank: Honorary Colonel
- Unit: South Nottinghamshire Yeomanry Cavalry

Arms of Pierrepont: Argent semée of cinquefoils gules, a lion rampant sable

Sydney William Herbert Pierrepont, 3rd Earl Manvers (12 March 1826 – 16 January 1900) was a British hereditary peer and politician.

== Early life and education ==
Born at Holme Pierrepont in 1826, Pierrepont was the second but only surviving son of Charles Pierrepont, 2nd Earl Manvers and his wife Mary Letitia Eyre. He was educated at Eton, entered Christ Church, Oxford, in 1843 and received his BA in 1846.

Pierrepont was styled Viscount Newark after the death of his elder brother in 1850.

== Military service ==
Whilst at Oxford, Pierrepont was commissioned a first lieutenant in the Nottinghamshire Yeomanry Cavalry (Sherwood Rangers) in 1844.

In 1851, he was commissioned a Captain in the South Nottinghamshire Yeomanry Cavalry. He was appointed Lieutenant-colonel commandant of his yeomanry regiment in 1868, and honorary Colonel of the regiment in 1879.

== Political career ==
In 1852, Pierrepont was elected unopposed as Conservative Member of Parliament for South Nottinghamshire. He continued to sit for South Nottinghamshire until 1860 when he succeeded to the earldom upon his father's death.

He was named a Deputy Lieutenant (DL) of Nottinghamshire in 1854.

== Family and children ==
Pierrepont married Georgine Jane Elizabeth Fanny de Franquetot, second daughter of Augustin-Gustave de Franquetot, 3rd Duke of Coigny in 1852. They had five children:

- Lady Emily Annora Charlotte Pierrepont (16 March 1853 – 11 May 1935), married Frederick Lygon, 6th Earl Beauchamp, in 1878.
- Charles William Sydney Pierrepont, 4th Earl Manvers (2 August 1854 – 17 July 1926)
- Hon Evelyn Henry Pierrepont (23 August 1856 – 4 June 1926), married Sophia Arkwright. Their eldest son was Gervas Evelyn Pierrepont, 6th Earl Manvers.
- Hon. Henry Sydney Pierrepont (18 August 1863 – 4 March 1882)
- Lady Mary Augusta Pierrepont (21 December 1865 – 6 March 1917), married John Peter Grant in 1899.

== Death ==
Lord Manvers died in January 1900 at the age of 73 at Thoresby Hall from bronchitis after having influenza. He was succeeded in the earldom by his eldest son, Charles.

Parliament of the United Kingdom
Preceded by Thomas Thoroton-Hildyard; William Hodgson Barrow	Member of Parliament for South Nottinghamshire; 1852 – 1860; With: William Hodgson Barrow	Succeeded by William Hodgson Barrow; Lord Stanhope
Military offices
New title	Honorary Colonel of the South Nottinghamshire Yeomanry Cavalry; 1879–1900	Succeeded by The Lord Belper
Peerage of the United Kingdom
Preceded by Charles Pierrepont	Earl Manvers; 1860–1900	Succeeded by Charles Pierrepont
