= Myles Thoroton Hildyard =

Myles Thoroton Hildyard MBE MC (1914–2005) was an English landowner, diarist and historian. He won the Military Cross for his escape from a prisoner-of-war camp after the Battle of Crete.

== Life ==
He was the eldest son of the barrister Gerald Moresby Thoroton Hildyard and his wife Sybil Hamilton Hoare of Stourton, Wiltshire; he was a grandson of General Henry Hildyard, and the diplomat David Henry Thoroton Hildyard (1916–1997) was the younger of his two brothers. He was educated at Eton College and Magdalene College, Cambridge. He was a barrister of Lincoln's Inn, but did not practise law.

Hildyard served in the Nottinghamshire (Sherwood Rangers) Yeomanry in World War II, posted first to Palestine and Egypt. On Crete in 1941, he was captured by the Germans during their airborne invasion. He escaped from the camp where he was held at Maleme Airport, with Michael Parish. After three months on the run in island, they crossed by sea to Turkey. Hildyard was then in action with the 8th Armoured Division at the Battle of El Alamein. He became an intelligence officer, posted to North Africa, Italy and France. His wartime service was recognised by the award of an MBE.

Hildyard served as Deputy Lieutenant and a justice of the peace for Nottinghamshire. He was Lord of the manor of Flintham and of Screveton, and patron of the living of Flintham. He also became known for his work at Flintham Hall, a Grade I listed house, which The Independent noted in its obituary of Hildyard, has been described as "perhaps the most gloriously romantic Victorian house in England." He restored the landscape park and woodland that enclose the Hall and Conservatory and the Hall's walled garden.

Homosexual, Hildyard never married. He was buried 24 August 2005, at St Augustine's Church, Flintham. The Thoroton Society of Nottinghamshire, the county's foremost historical organisation, of which Myles Hildyard was long-serving president, started a Myles Thoroton Annual Lecture Series, for which he had left a bequest in his will. His niece Marianna Hildyard, daughter of his brother David, is the wife of British Labour politician Charles Falconer, Baron Falconer of Thoroton, whose title derives from his wife's family name.

== Works ==
Hildyard's best-known works are his World War II letters, and a diary he wrote while serving as captain in the Nottinghamshire Yeomanry (Sherwood Rangers). His letters home and the diary from his escape were collected in a book published by Bloomsbury in 2005: It is Bliss Here: Letters Home, 1939–1945.

Hildyard also wrote detailed histories of the Thoroton and Hildyard families, and a history of Flintham village. In 1975 he was elected a Fellow of the Society of Antiquaries.

== Reputation ==
Hildyard became known in the community for his good fellowship. "Flintham was, for the years Myles Hildyard was its guardian," noted The Independent in its obituary, "a most remarkable place to visit. Not just because of the beauty and richness of its physical surroundings, but also because he himself was so remarkable a person. 'He was, in a way,' writes Antony Beevor, 'the local equivalent of Nancy Mitford's Lord Merlin.' At Flintham he encouraged and received a stream of visitors young and old, who brought lively conversation, stimulation and enjoyment to a house which, when his father inherited, had been a rather forbidding and lifeless place."
