= Thomas Thoroton-Hildyard =

English politician (1821–1888)

The Right Honourable Thomas Thoroton-Hildyard JP DL
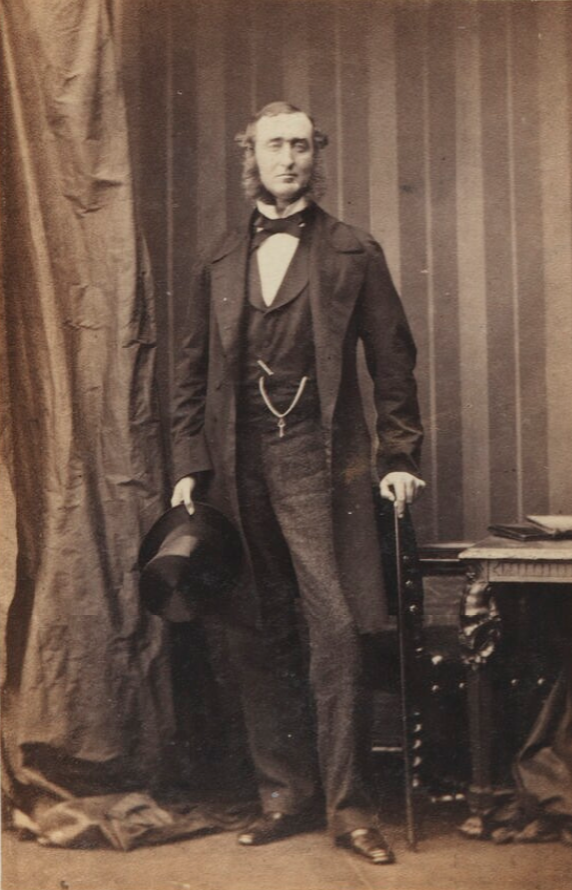
- Photograph of Thoroton-Hildyard, 1861

Member of Parliament for South Nottinghamshire
- In office 1866–1885 Serving with William Hodgson Barrow, George Storer
- Preceded by: Lord Stanhope; William Hodgson Barrow
- Succeeded by: Constituency abolished
- In office 1846–1852 Serving with Lancelot Rolleston, Robert Bromley, William Hodgson Barrow
- Preceded by: The Earl of Lincoln; Lancelot Rolleston
- Succeeded by: Viscount Newark; William Hodgson Barrow

Personal details
- Born: Thomas Blackborne Thoroton-Hildyard; 8 April 1821 Flintham Hall, Nottinghamshire
- Died: 19 March 1888 (aged 66)
- Party: Conservative
- Spouse: Anne Margaret Rochfort
- Relations: Henry Hildyard (brother)
- Parent(s): Thomas Blackborne Thoroton-Hildyard; Anne Catherine Whyte
- Education: Eton College
- Alma mater: Christ Church, Oxford

Thomas Blackborne Thoroton-Hildyard JP DL (8 April 1821 – 19 March 1888) was an English Conservative Party politician who sat in the House of Commons in two periods between 1846 and 1885.

== Early life ==
Thoroton-Hildyard was born at the family seat, Flintham Hall, Nottinghamshire, on 8 April 1821. He was the eldest son of Col. Thomas Blackborne Thoroton-Hildyard (1788–1830), and Anne Catherine Whyte. His mother was the niece and heiress of Sir Robert D'Arcy Hildyard, 4th Baronet, and in connection with inheriting of the Hildyard family's estates based around Winestead Hall in the East Riding of Yorkshire, his father had assumed the surname Hildyard in addition to Thoroton in 1815.

Among his siblings were Robert D'Arcy Hildyard of Colburn Hall (who married Anna Jane Burne); the Rev. Henry Hildyard, rector of Rowley and Winestead, who married Julia Wharton; John George Bowes Hildyard of Dunnington Hall (who married Caroline Denison); Anne Catharine Hildyard; Mary Anne Hildyard (who married Rev. James Chichester); Elizabeth Frances Hildyard (who married Sir John Thorold, 11th Baronet); and Esther Sophia Hildyard (who married Charles Goad).

Thoroton-Hildyard was educated at Eton College and Christ Church, Oxford.

== Career ==
He was a Justice of the Peace and Deputy Lieutenant for Nottinghamshire and a major in the South Nottinghamshire Yeomanry Cavalry.

In 1846 Thoroton-Hildyard was elected Member of Parliament for Nottinghamshire South. It was a toughly contested election. Hildyard was supported, according to the University of Nottingham, by the 4th Duke of Newcastle under Lyne "in spite of the fact that Newcastle’s son, the Earl of Lincoln, was his opponent. Lincoln attacked Hildyard’s youth and inexperience, but the 'young squire' still defeated him by a majority of almost 700." Thoroton-Hildyard held South Nottinghamshire from 1846 until 1852. In 1863 he was High Sheriff of Nottinghamshire. He was re-elected MP for South Nottinghamshire in 1866 and continued to represent the constituency until his retirement in 1885.

=== Estates ===
Upon his father's death in 1830, he inherited the family's estates at Flintham, Screveton and Winestead were administered by his mother and two of his paternal uncles during his minority. They were able to secure Flintham Hall against his father's creditors by selling his Lincolnshire estates.

Thoroton-Hildyard was responsible for the Italianate extension of Flintham Hall by the Nottingham architect Thomas Chambers Hine between 1853 and 1857. His extravagant spending forced him to let Flintham Hall out to tenants and live abroad for a time. In 1884, he sold the remaining Hildyard estates at Winestead in Yorkshire to the Hull Corporation.

== Personal life ==
Thoroton-Hildyard married Anne Margaret Rochfort, daughter of Mary Burgh (a daughter of Thomas Burgh, MP) and Col. John Staunton Rochfort of Clogrennane, County Carlow. Together, they were the parents of:

- Thomas Blackborne Thoroton-Hildyard (1843–1928), who married Eleanor Herbert, daughter of Henry Arthur Herbert of Muckross, MP for County Kerry.
- Robert Charles Thoroton Hildyard (1844–1885), who married his cousin, Anne Catherine Hildyard, in 1871.
- Gen. Sir Henry John Thoroton Hildyard (1846–1916), who married Annette Prevost, a daughter of Adm. James Charles Prevost, in 1871.

Thoroton-Hildyard died at the age of 66.

=== Descendants ===
Through his son Henry, he was the grandfather of General Sir Reginald Hildyard (1876–1965), who inherited the Flintham estate upon the death of his childless uncle Thomas in 1928.

Parliament of the United Kingdom
Preceded by The Earl of Lincoln; Lancelot Rolleston	Member of Parliament for South Nottinghamshire; 1846 – 1852; With: Lancelot Rolleston to 1849; Robert Bromley 1849–1851; William Hodgson Barrow from 1851	Succeeded by Viscount Newark; William Hodgson Barrow
Preceded by Lord Stanhope; William Hodgson Barrow	Member of Parliament for South Nottinghamshire; 1866 – 1885; With: William Hodgson Barrow to 1874; George Storer from 1874	Constituency abolished
