= Ruth Herbert =

English stage actress and model for Dante Gabriel Rossetti

Louisa Ruth Herbert
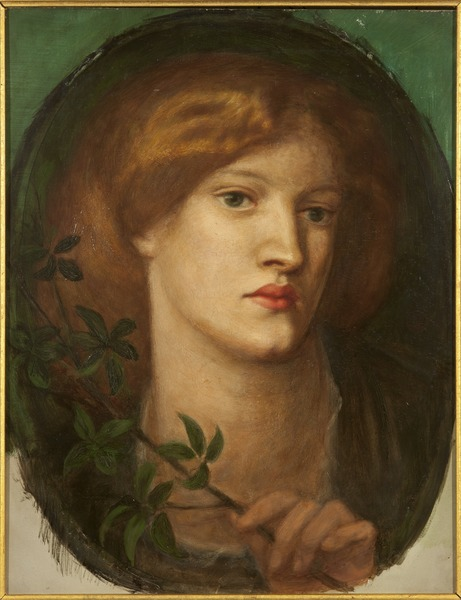
- Portrait by Dante Gabriel Rossetti, c. 1858
- Born: 1831
- Died: 1921 (aged 89–90)
- Occupations: London stage actress, theatre manager, artists' model
- Spouse(s): Edward Crabb; John Downes Rochfort

Louisa Ruth Herbert (1831 – 1921) was a well-known Victorian-era English stage actress and model for the artist Dante Gabriel Rossetti.

== Biography ==
=== Background ===
Ruth Herbert was the daughter of a West Country brass founder. She was also known as Mrs Crabbe, having married Edward Crabb, a share and stock dealer, which gave her a certain measure of respectability generally lacking in actresses in the Victorian era. By the mid-1850s, she was no longer living with her husband. She embellished the surname Crabb with a final "e" but used her maiden name Herbert as a stage name.

=== Actress ===
She had performed at the Theatre Royal, Glasgow in 1855 before she made her London stage debut on 15 October 1855 at the Royal Strand Theatre. She also acted at the Olympic Theatre before moving on to St. James's Theatre, London.

Her early roles were in comedy and burlesque productions and she drew eyes with her beauty. She gained favourable reviews for her performance as the lead in Tom Taylor's Retribution at the Olympic. One of her well-known roles was the lead in an 1863 stage production of the sensation novel Lady Audley's Secret at St. James's Theatre. Author Mary Elizabeth Braddon said Herbert gave her favourite performance as Lady Audley.

=== Artist's model ===
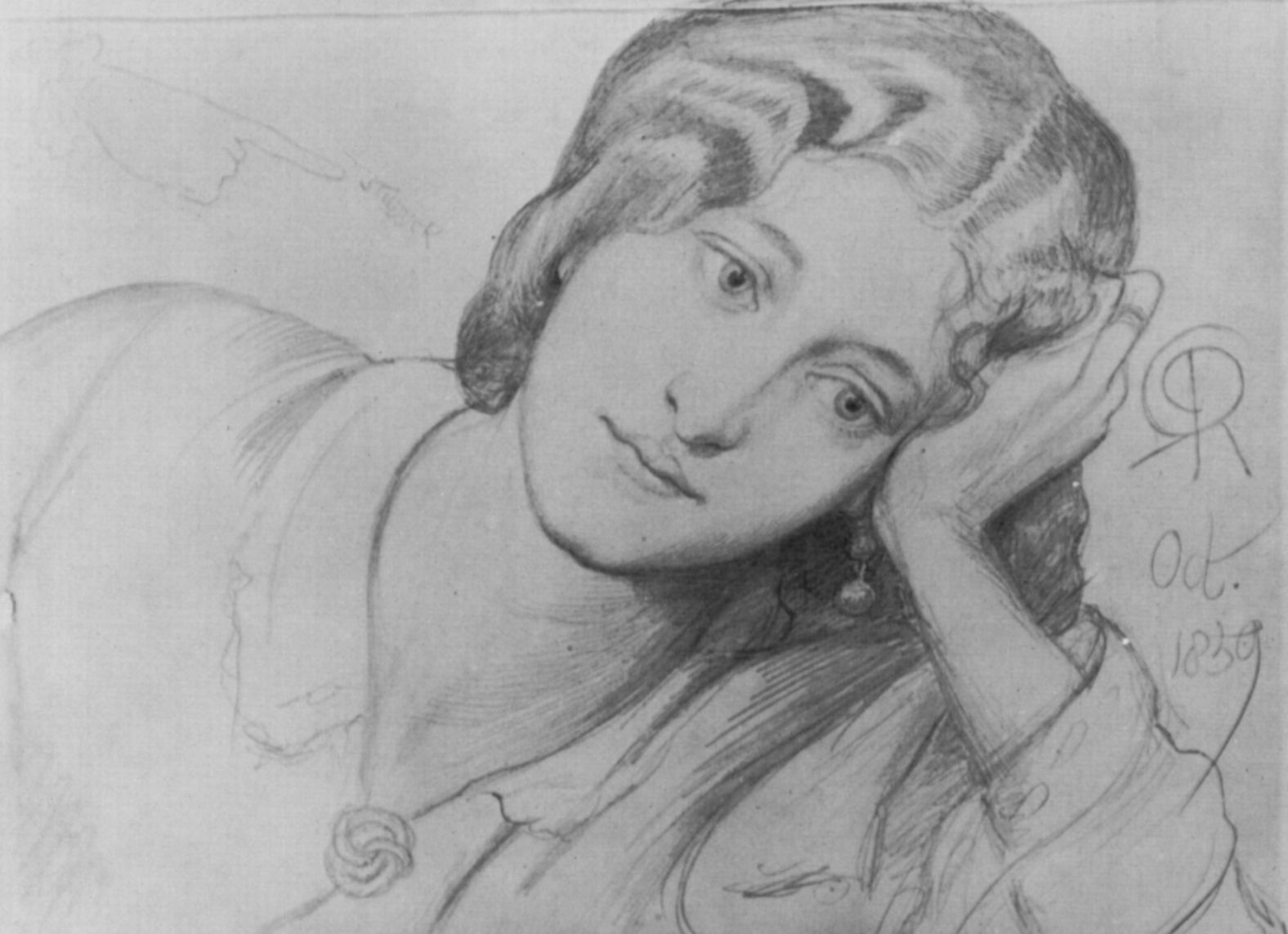
Portrait by Dante Gabriel Rossetti, 1859. The word "stunner" is written on the left.

She first posed for Dante Gabriel Rossetti's painting 1858 painting Mary Magdalene at the Door of Simon the Pharisee. Rossetti called her a "stunner", one of the beautiful women he sought out as models for his art. As he was waiting for her to arrive, he wrote to his friend William Bell Scott of his enthusiasm for her:

I am in the stunning position this morning of expecting the actual visit, at 1/2 past 11, of a model whom I have been longing to paint for years – Miss Herbert of the Olympic Theatre – who has the most varied and highest expression I ever saw in a woman's face, besides abundant beauty, golden hair, etc. Did you ever see her? O my eye! she has sat to me now and will sit to me for Mary Magdalene in the picture I am beginning. Such luck!

Herbert went on to sit often for Rossetti in 1858 and 1859. Rossetti and Herbert did not stay in regular contact past 1860, though he based a future work on the drawing and painting he had done of her previously.

Herbert bequeathed several of the drawings made of her by Rossetti to her son, Major A. B. Crabbe, and they were sold at auction at Christie's in 1922.

=== Later life ===
According to Rossetti's biographer Jan Marsh, Herbert's private life was scandalous; separated from her stockbroker husband, she and her son were set up by a wealthy admirer near Eaton Square, while various other gentleman vied for her favours. She became pregnant by, and later married, John Rochfort, ex-army officer, son of Col. John Staunton Rochfort, and amateur artist.

She later managed the St. James's Theatre, London from 1864 to 1868. She hired the then little-known Henry Irving as her leading man and assistant stage manager at the theatre. One of the plays that she commissioned there was W. S. Gilbert's first successful solo play, Dulcamara, or the Little Duck and the Great Quack (1866).

In 1894 she published a cookbook called The St. James's Cookery Book under her married name, Louisa Rochfort.
