= William Hodgson Barrow =

English politician (1784-1876)

William Hodgson Barrow (1 September 1784 – 29 January 1876) was an English Conservative politician who sat in the House of Commons from 1851 to 1874.

Barrow was the son of the Rev. Richard Barrow, of Southwell and his wife Mary Hodgkinson, daughter of George Hodgkinson. His uncle was William Barrow archdeacon of Nottingham. He was educated at the Collegiate School at Southwell, and practised as an attorney from 1806 to 1833. He was a Fellow of the Royal Agricultural Society, the Royal Botanic Society, and the Archaeological Society. He was a deputy lieutenant and J.P. for Nottinghamshire and was High Sheriff of Nottinghamshire in 1845.

In 1851 Barrow was elected at a by-election as a member of parliament (MP) for South Nottinghamshire. He was returned unopposed at the five succeeding general elections and held the seat until 1874, when at 89 he retired.

Barrow died unmarried at the age of 91.

Parliament of the United Kingdom
Preceded by Robert Bromley; Thomas Thoroton-Hildyard	Member of Parliament for South Nottinghamshire; 1851 – 1874; With: Thomas Thoroton-Hildyard 1851–1852; Viscount Newark 1852–1860; Lord Stanhope 1860–1866; Thomas Thoroton-Hildyard 1866–1874	Succeeded by George Storer; Thomas Thoroton-Hildyard
Honorary titles
Preceded by Charles Paget	High Sheriff of Nottinghamshire; 1845	Succeeded by Francis Hall
