= Barton Abbey =

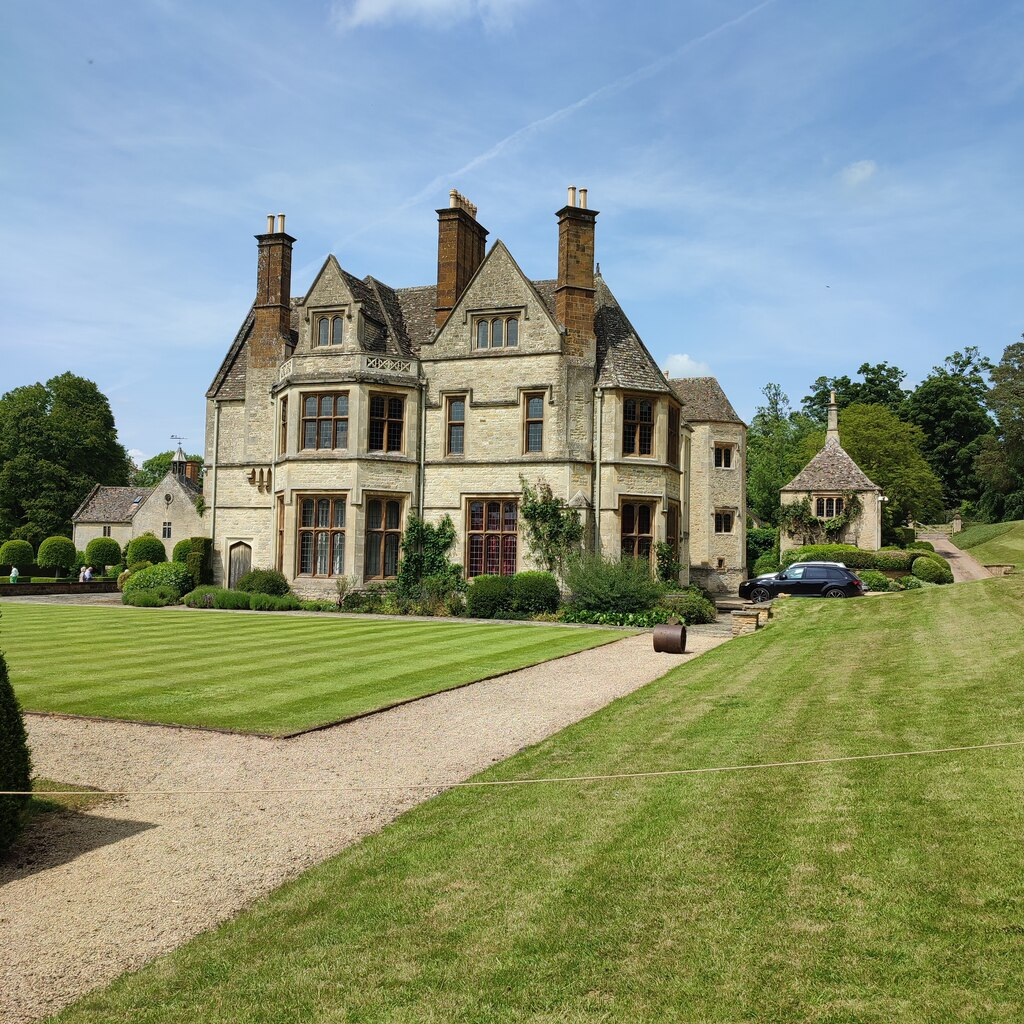
- Barton Abbey
- Interactive map of the Barton Abbey area

General information
- Type: House
- Location: Steeple Barton, Barton Abbey; Steeple Barton; Bicester; OX25 4QS, England, United Kingdom
- Coordinates: 51.92136°N 01.3267°W
- Construction started: 1570s

Listed Building – Grade II
- Official name: Barton Abbey
- Designated: 29 June 1988
- Reference no.: 1199521

Listed Building – Grade II
- Official name: Barton Abbey, outbuildings attached to north of Barton Abbey
- Designated: 29 June 1988
- Reference no.: 1052928

Listed Building – Grade II
- Official name: Barton Abbey, stables and attached wall and gateway approximately 27 metres north west of front porch and attached to Barton Abbey
- Designated: 29 June 1988
- Reference no.: 1052929

Listed Building – Grade II
- Official name: Home Farmhouse
- Designated: 29 June 1988
- Reference no.: 1367972

Barton Abbey is a privately owned house in Oxfordshire, England, in the parish of Steeple Barton. Parts of the building date from the 16th century but the majority of the structure is Victorian.

The house, plus some of its outbuildings and the associated Home Farm, are listed at Grade II by Historic England.

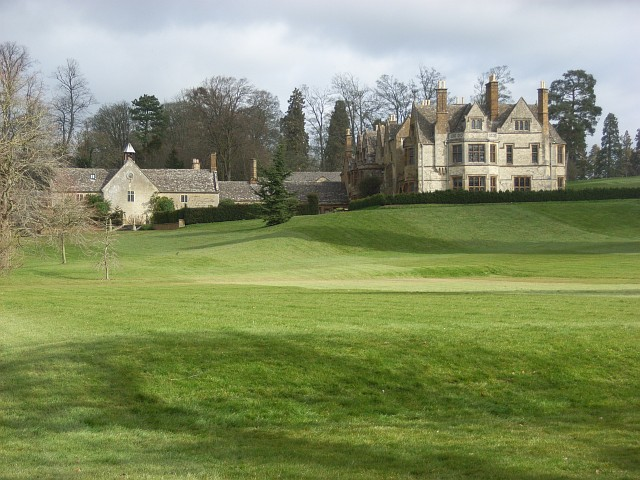
House and stables

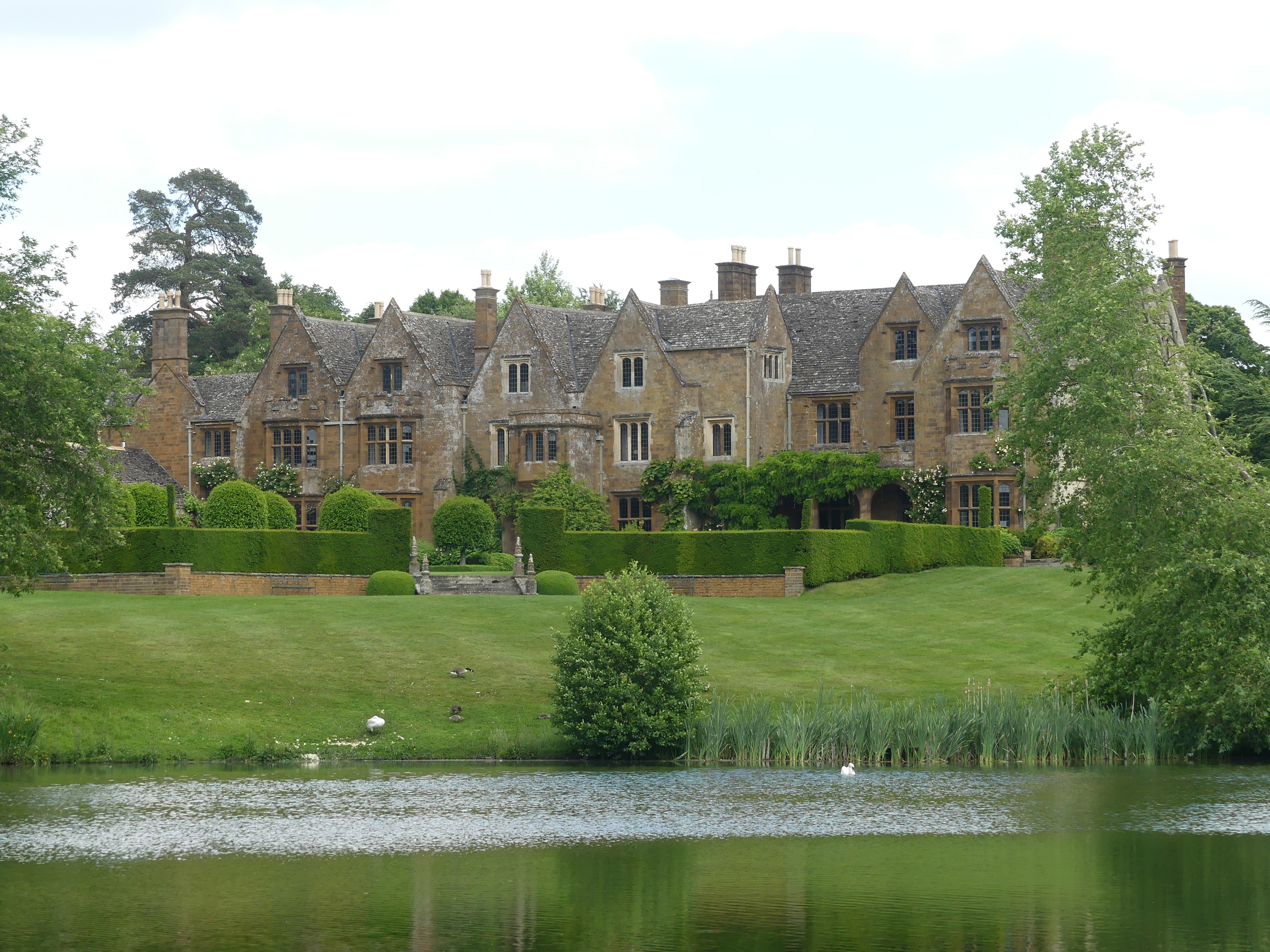
House and lake

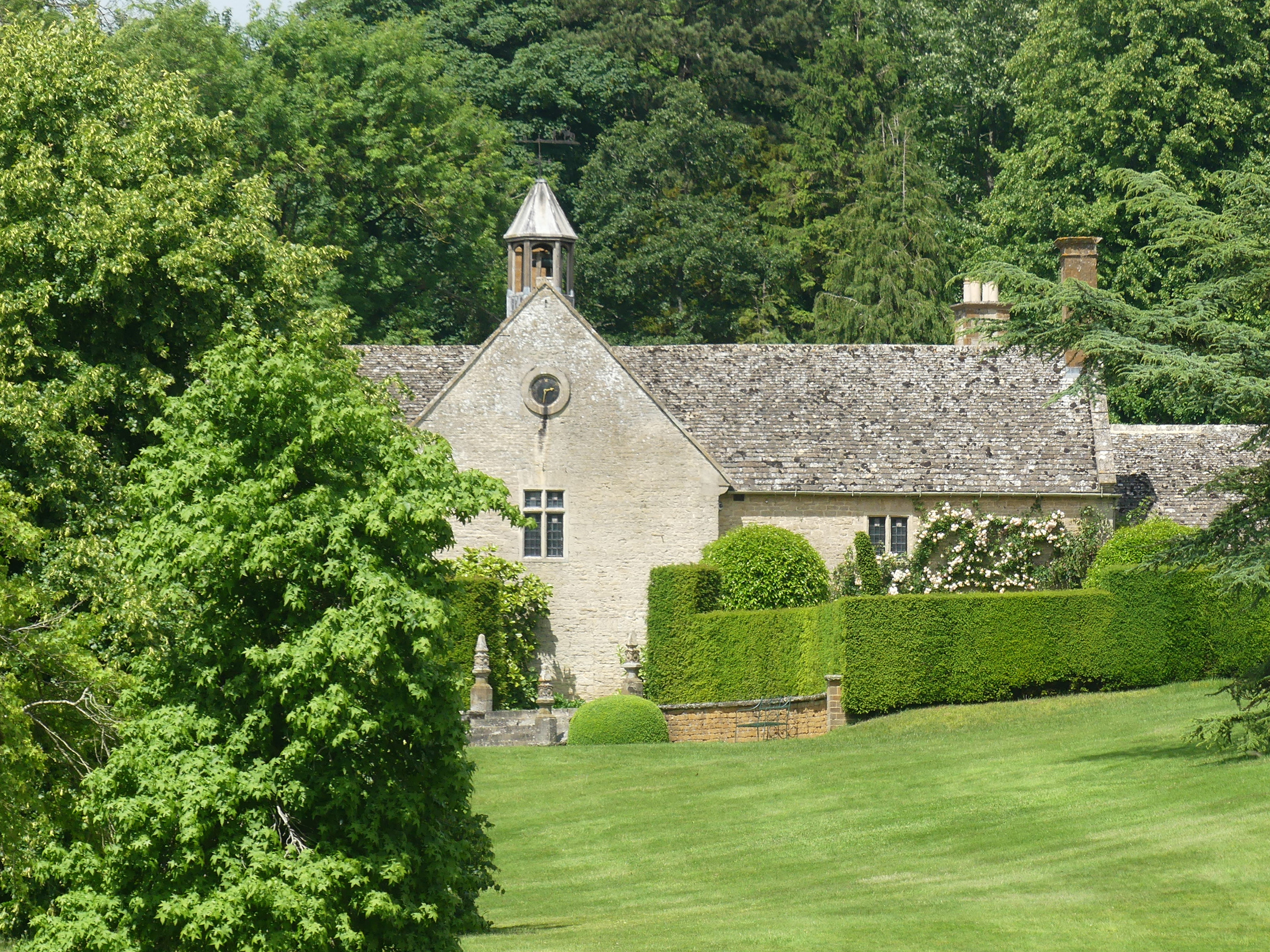
Stable block

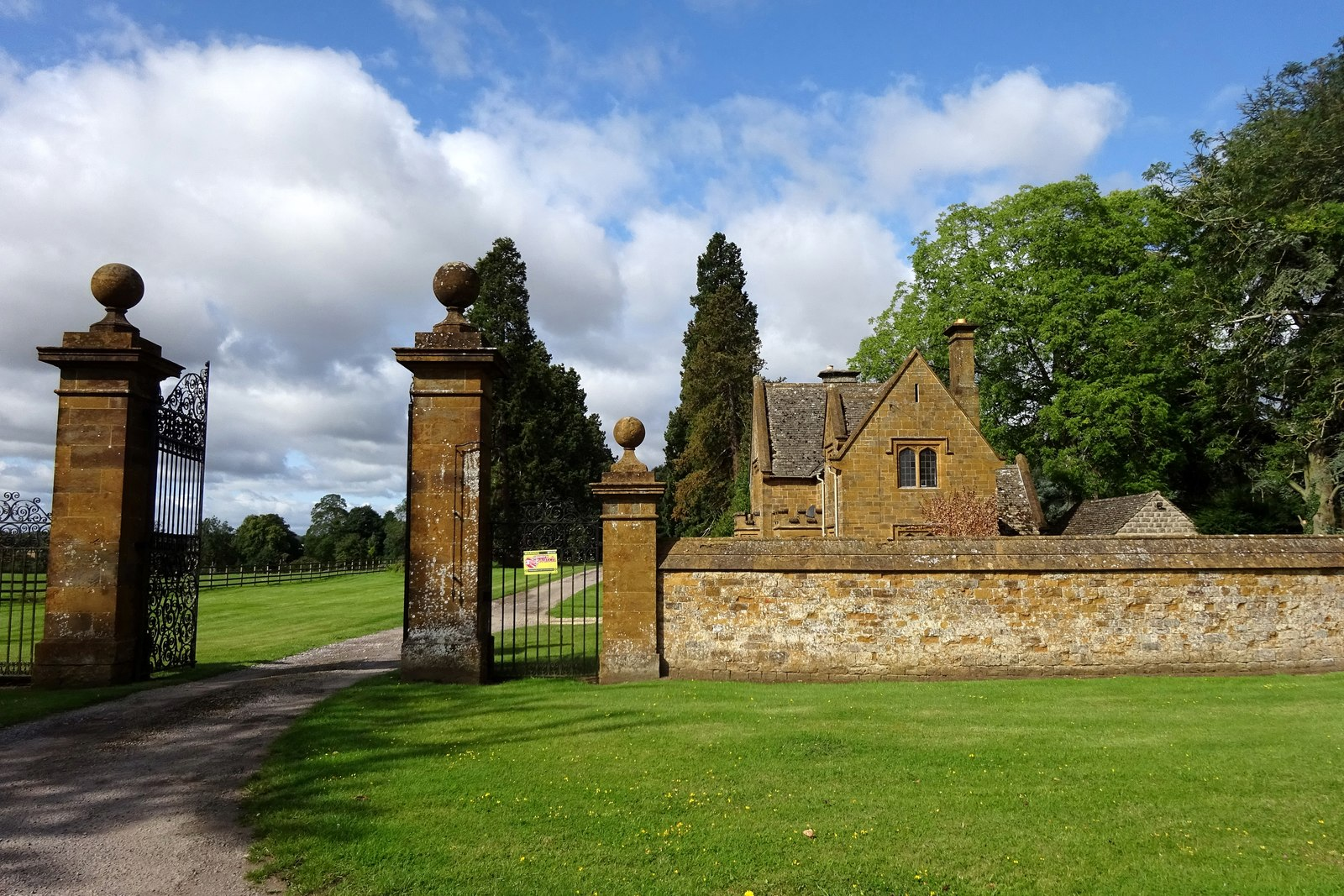
Entrance gates and lodge
