= Henry Hildyard (cricketer) =

English cricketer and barrister

Personal information
- Full name: Henry Charles Thoroton Hildyard
- Born: 16 October 1824; Flintham, Nottinghamshire, England
- Died: 14 September 1898 (aged 73); Rowley, Yorkshire, England
- Batting: Unknown

Domestic team information
- Years: Team
- 1843–1846: Oxford University
- 1844: Marylebone Cricket Club

Career statistics
Competition	First-class
Matches	5
Runs scored	66
Batting average	7.33
100s/50s	–/–
Top score	19
Catches/stumpings	3/–
- Source: Cricinfo, 9 May 2020

Henry Charles Thoroton Hildyard (16 October 1824 – 14 September 1898) was an English first-class cricketer and clergyman.

The son of Colonel Thomas Blackborne Thoroton-Hildyard, he was born in October 1824 at Flintham, Nottinghamshire. He was educated at Eton College, before going up to Merton College, Oxford. While studying at Oxford, he played first-class cricket intermittently for Oxford University between 1843 and 1846, making four appearances, in which he scored 57 runs with a high score of 19. In addition to playing for Oxford University, Hildyard also made a single first-class appearance for the Marylebone Cricket Club against Oxford University in 1844.

After graduating from Oxford, Hildyard took holy orders in the Church of England. He was the rector of Rowley in Yorkshire from 1852 until his death there in September 1898. His brother was the politician Thomas Thoroton-Hildyard.
