= Thomas Graves Law =

English priest

Thomas Graves Law (1836–1904) was an English Oratorian priest, and later in life a historian and bibliographer.

== Life ==
He was a grandson of Edward Law, 1st Baron Ellenborough. Born on 4 December 1836 at Yeovilton in Somerset, Law was third son and fourth of eight surviving children of William Towry Law (1809–1886), Lord Ellenborough's youngest son, by his first wife, Augusta Champagné (died 1844), fourth daughter of Thomas North Graves, 2nd Baron Graves. The eldest son Augustus Henry Law was a Jesuit missionary, and the second son, General Francis Towry Adeane Law, C.B. (1835–1901), saw much military service. The father originally served in the Grenadier guards, but in 1831 had taken orders in the Church of England, and at the time of his son's birth was rector of Yeovilton and chancellor of the diocese of Bath and Wells, of which his kinsman George Henry Law was bishop.

On the death of his mother in 1844, Law was sent to school at Somerton, but in the following year, after his father had moved to the living of Harborne in Staffordshire, he was successively sent to St. Edmund's School, Birmingham, and (as founder's kin) to Winchester College, then under George Moberly. In 1851 his father joined the Roman Catholic Church, so that Thomas left Winchester. In 1852 he studied at University College, London, where he had Augustus De Morgan and Francis Newman among his teachers, and in 1853 he entered Stonyhurst College. His father obtained for him a cadetship in the military service of the East India Company. In 1855, however, under the influence of his father's friend, Frederick William Faber, he entered the Brompton Oratory, London, where he was ordained priest in 1860.

Law remained at the Oratory till 1878, when, after a loss of his Catholic faith, he left its communion.

In 1879 Law was appointed keeper of the Signet Library in Edinburgh, supported by the influence of William Ewart Gladstone, a friend. There he passed the remainder of his life. He was one of the founders, in 1886, of the Scottish History Society, and acted as its honorary secretary. In 1898 the University of Edinburgh made him hon. LL.D. After a long illness he died at his home at Duddingston, near Edinburgh, on 12 March 1904.

== Works ==
Law's main historical interests lay in the sixteenth century, and its religious and ecclesiastical aspects. His major work is The Conflicts between Jesuits and Seculars in the reign of Queen Elizabeth (1889). He also wrote many reviews and articles, some of which are in Collected Essays and Reviews of Thomas Graves Law, LL.D. (Edinburgh, 1904). To the Dictionary of National Biography he contributed 16 articles, including those for David Laing, Edmund Law, Robert Parsons, and Nicholas Sanders. For the Camden Society he edited The Archpriest Controversy, 2 vols. (1896–8); and for the Scottish Text Society, Catholic Tractates of the Sixteenth Century, 1901, and The New Testament in Scots, 3 vols. (1901–3). In Scottish history he edited Archbishop Hamilton's Catechism, with a preface by Gladstone (Oxford, 1884), and a chapter on Mary Stuart in the Cambridge Modern History vol. iii.

== Family ==
Law was married on 15 April 1880 to Wilhelmina Frederica, daughter of Captain Allen of Errol, Perthshire, by his wife Lady Henrietta Dundas. The couple had one son, Henry Duncan Graves Law, and five daughters.

- Frida Margaret Graves, married in 1908 Charles Paul Taylor
- Frances Augusta Laura, married in 1902 John Ayling
- Augusta Isobel Amelia, married in 1910 Roden Horace Powlett Orde (1867–1941), Red Cross and Joint War Organisation administrator
- Louisa Georgina Wilfrid, married in 1920 Frederick Charles Ellis
- Anne Flavel Allen
