= William Towry Law =

English cleric (1809–1886)

William Towry Law (16 June 1809 – 31 October 1886) a former Chancellor of the Diocese of Bath and Wells, who converted to Catholicism in 1851.

== Early life ==
He came from an old Westmorland family and was the youngest son of Lord Ellenborough, Lord Chief Justice of England, and Anne Towry. He was educated at Eton College and Peterhouse, Cambridge, with an M.A. awarded in 1834.

== Career ==
He entered the 51st Regiment in 1826 and was based in Corfu. Together with his brother Henry he served on the staff of the French General Maison commanding the French army in the Morea and was present at the capture of Morea Castle.

In 1830 he was commissioned in the Grenadier Guards; after his marriage in 1831 he left the army and took Anglican holy orders. He was at Yeovilton, Whitchurch Canonicorum, East Brent, and Harborne. He was Chancellor and Prebendary of the Diocese of Bath and Wells from 1839 to 1851. He was made president of the Church Union.

He wrote concerning The Gorham case. He converted to Catholicism in 1851 as a result of the Gorham judgement and he was received into the church at Oscott on 19 September 1851. He wrote a letter to his parishioners explaining his decision. He went to the United States in 1858, returning after a year to Boulogne, eventually settling at Hampton Court Palace.

== Personal life ==
He was married twice. Firstly to Hon. Augusta Champagne Graves, daughter of Thomas Graves, 2nd Baron Graves, on 15 March 1831. Augusta died on 16 October 1844 while giving birth to their eighth child, a girl also named Augusta. Two years after her death he married secondly, Matilda Montgomery, daughter of Sir Conyngham Montgomery, 1st Baronet, on 25 January 1846. He had five sons, one daughter with Augusta and two more sons and a daughter with Matilda.

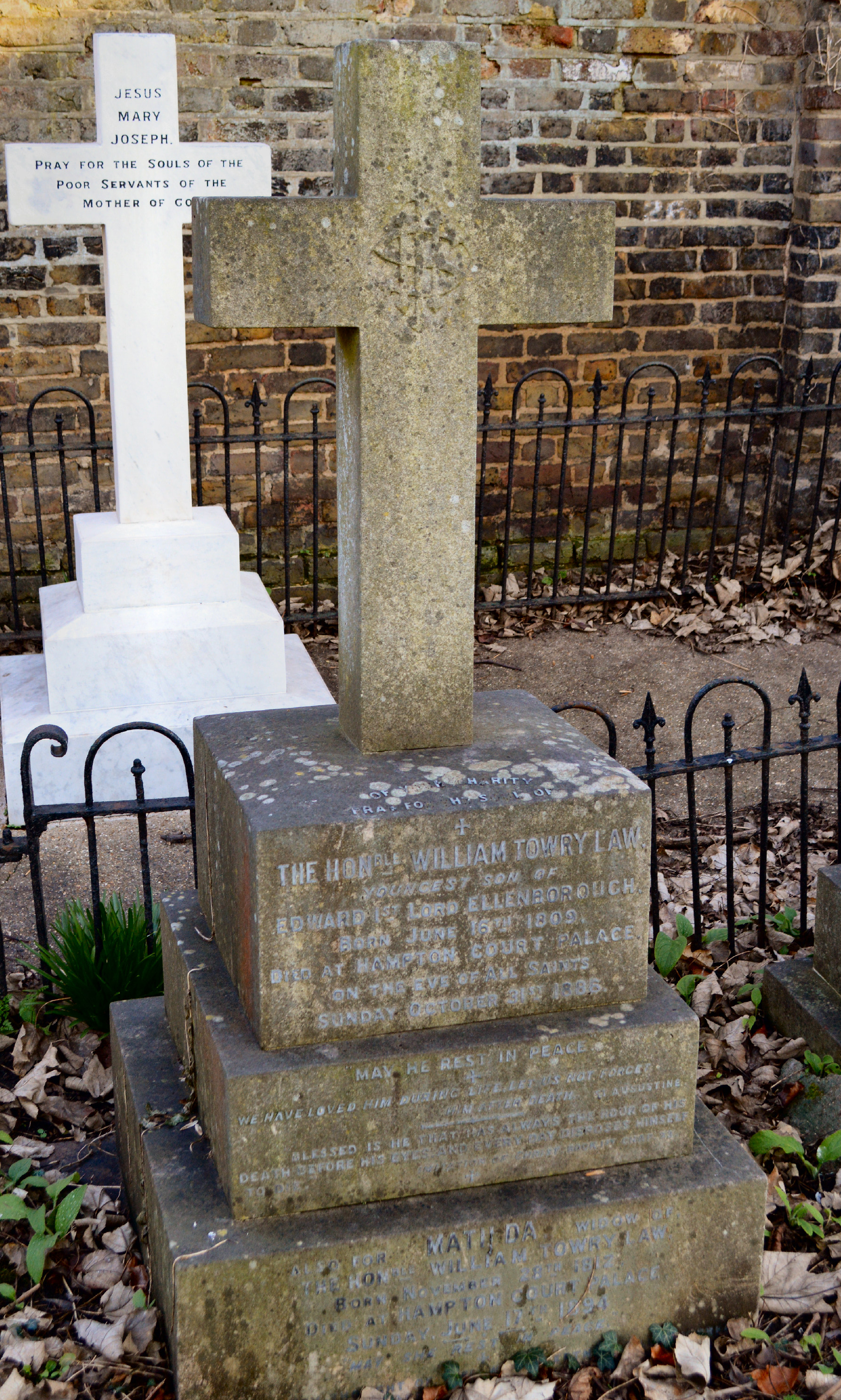
Grave

He died at Hampton Court Palace on 31 October 1886. Matilda also died at Hampton Court on 18 June 1894. They are both buried at St Mary Magdalen Church, Mortlake where there is a stained-glass window commemorating him and his son, Augustus, who died in Rhodesia as a missionary priest. He later published 'A Memoir of the Life and Death of the Rev. Father Augustus Henry Law, S.J.' (1882–1883).

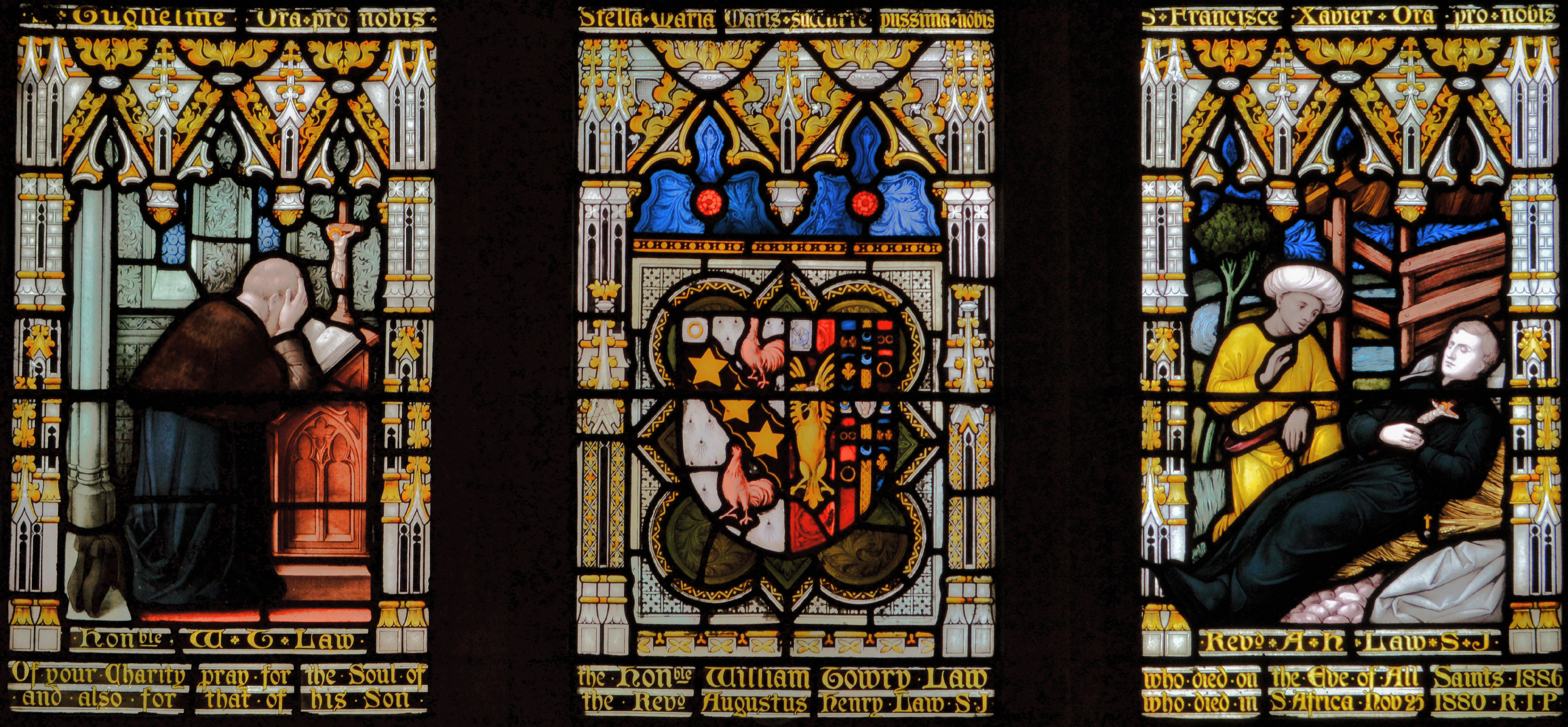
St Mary Magdalen, Mortlake

His children with Augusta were:

- Reverend Augustus Henry Law (1833–1880)
- Maj.-Gen. Francis Towry Adeane Law (1835–1901)
- Thomas Graves Law (1836–1904)
- Commander Frederick Charles Law (1841–1922)
- Maj.-Gen. Victor Edward Law (1842–1910)
- Augusta Caroline Louisa Law (1844–1920)

Children with Matilda:

- Geraldine Isabella Cecilia Law (1848–1940)
- Ernest Philip Alphonso Law (1854–1930)
- Sir William Algernon Law (1856–1943)
