= Reginald Hildyard =

British Army general (1876–1965)

General Sir Reginald Hildyard KCB CMG DSO
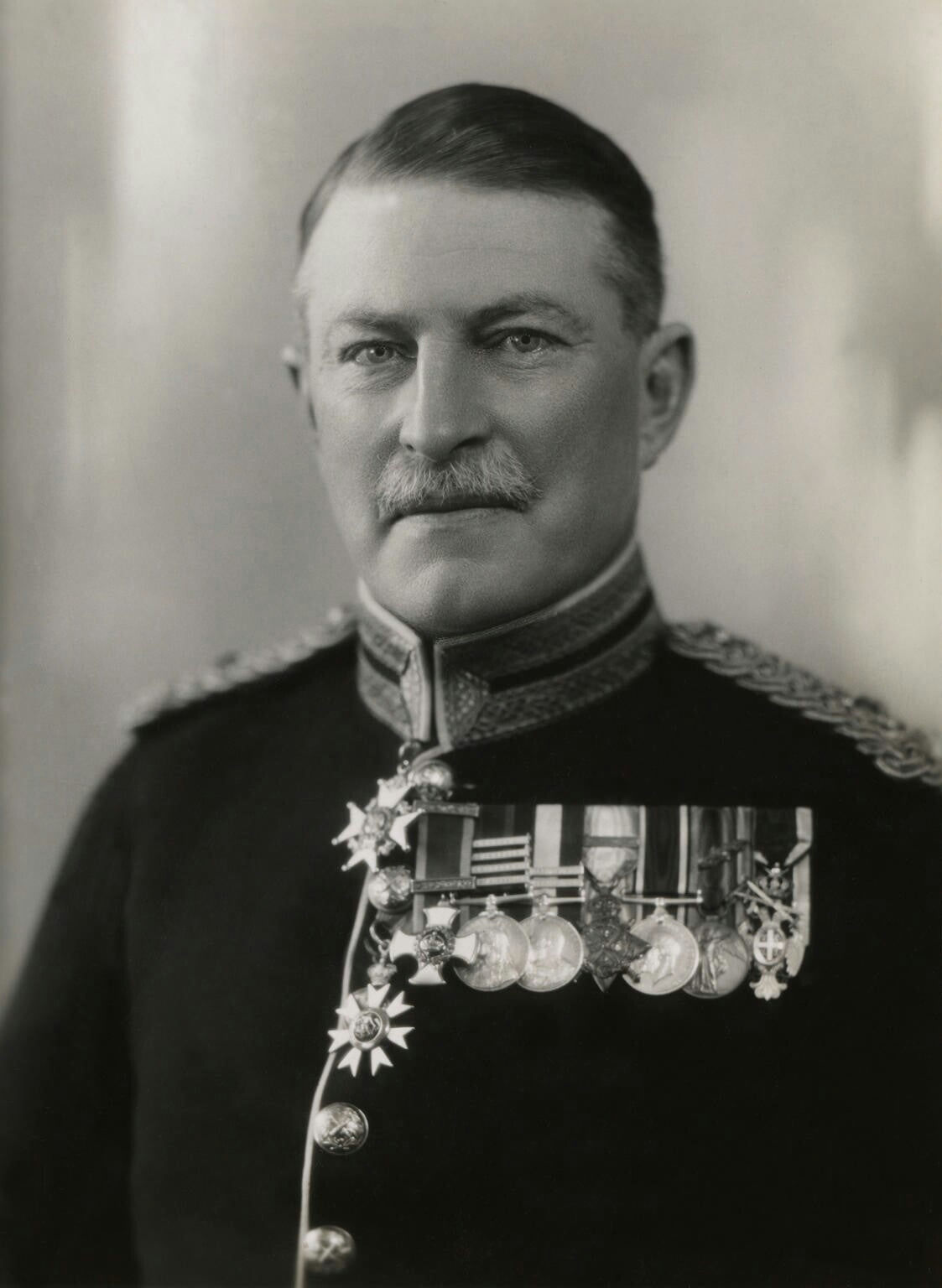
- Major-General Reginald Hildyard, May 1930
- Born: 11 December 1876; Frimley, Surrey, England
- Died: 29 September 1965 (aged 88); East Sussex, England
- Relatives: Henry Hildyard (father); Thomas Thoroton-Hildyard (grandfather)
- Military career
- Allegiance: United Kingdom
- Branch: British Army
- Service years: 1896–1939
- Rank: General
- Commands: 43rd (Wessex) Infantry Division; Governor & Commander-in-Chief Bermuda
- Conflicts: Second Boer War; First World War
- Awards: Knight Commander of the Order of the Bath; Companion of the Order of St Michael and St George; Distinguished Service Order; Mentioned in Despatches (7); Order of the White Eagle (Serbia)

General Sir Reginald John Thoroton Hildyard, KCB, CMG, DSO (11 December 1876 – 29 September 1965) was a British Army officer who saw active service in the Second Boer War and the First World War. He was Governor and Commander-in-Chief of Bermuda from 1936 to 1939.

== Early life ==
The third son of General Sir Henry Hildyard, by his marriage to Annette, the daughter of Admiral James Charles Prevost, Hildyard's brothers were Harold Charles Thoroton Hildyard (born 1872) and Gerald Moresby Thoroton Hildyard (1874–1956). He also had one sister, Edith Mary Thoroton Hildyard.

== Military career ==
Hildyard was commissioned as a second lieutenant into the Queen's Own Royal West Kent Regiment in 1896. He was promoted to lieutenant in 1899, captain in 1904, major in 1915, colonel in 1919, major general in 1929, lieutenant general in 1934, and general in 1938.

Hildyard served in South Africa during the Second Boer War of 1899–1902, receiving the Queen's Medal with four clasps and the King's Medal with two clasps; from 1900 to 1903 he was employed with the South African Constabulary and served as Aide-de-camp (ADC) to the lieutenant general commanding in South Africa, from 1904 to 1905, then as ADC to the General Officer Commanding, Africa, from 1905 to 1908. He was a General Staff Officer (3rd grade) at the War Office from 1911 to 1913, then Brigade-Major in the Southern Command, 1913 to 1914, and passed the Staff College.

He served in the First World War of 1914–1918, was seven times mentioned in despatches, and was appointed a Companion of the Distinguished Service Order and a Companion of the Order of St Michael and St George. He was promoted to temporary lieutenant colonel in October 1915, when he was assigned as general staff officer, grade 1 (GSO1) of the 13th (Western) Division, in succession to Brigadier General Webb Gillman. He was promoted again, now to brevet colonel, in January 1919.

He was also appointed a Companion of the Order of the Bath (CB) in the 1928 Birthday Honours and appointed to command the 2nd Rhine Brigade later that year. He served as General Officer Commanding the 43rd (Wessex) Infantry Division, Territorial Army, from 1930 to 1934, and was promoted to Knight Commander of the Order of the Bath in the 1936 New Year Honours.

== Governor of Bermuda ==
From 1936 to 1939, Hildyard was Governor and Commander-in-Chief of Bermuda. He retired the service in 1939. Hildyard promoted the Bermuda Government's plans to establish birth control clinics on the island in order to "check the growth of the Negro population," because they represented "the biggest problem" of the "Colony's major difficulties" online archive.

The 1939 census recorded 3,098 coloured, 124 white, and 64 Portuguese persons of illegitimate birth. Bermuda's population was undergoing rapid and accelerating growth at the time, with fears that it had already passed a sustainable level. In 1699, ninety years after settlement began, the population had been 5,862; by 1811 it had been 10,180; by 1871 it had been 12,101; by 1911 it had been 18,994; by 1931 it had been 27,789, and by 1939 was 30,799. This was partly down to high birth rates, which, as elsewhere in the world, were highest amongst the least affluent and privileged, who in Bermuda were disproportionately coloured (which, in Bermuda, designated anyone not entirely of European ancestry). There was also a long history of white fears over the changing ratio of coloured to white Bermudians, which had resulted in official barriers being placed against the immigration of free coloured people and the discouragement of the importation of enslaved coloured people (which had included Native Americans during the Seventeenth Century). Efforts had also repeatedly been made to compel the emigration of free, and to encourage the export of enslaved, coloured Bermudians.

As coloured Bermudians lived cheek-by-jowl with the white, the different sub-groups of the population inevitably blended together. Although whites started with a clear majority, with every child of a coloured and a white parent added to the coloured total instead of the white, the coloured to population consequently grew faster, making up 2,247 of Bermuda's population of 5,862 in 1699, 4,919 of the 10,381 total in 1783, 5,596 of 9,930 in 1843, 12,303 of 18,994 in 1911, 16,436 of 27,789 in 1931, and 19,318 of 30,799. Since the end of slavery in 1834, the local government had encouraged white immigration through a number of methods, though the large Portuguese Bermudian demographic (2,622 in 1939) that was one of the results was treated as a third racial category, separate from whites. There had, however, also been considerable immigration since the end of the Nineteenth Century from British West Indian colonies which had added to the coloured population.

== Family life ==
On 23 November 1911, Hildyard married Muriel Mary Bonsor (1887–1975), the daughter of Sir Cosmo Bonsor, 1st Baronet, by his second marriage to Mabel Grace Brand.

Hildyard died on 29 September 1965 and at the time of his death was living at South Hartfield House, Coleman's Hatch, Sussex.

Military offices
Preceded by Sir George Jeffreys	General Officer Commanding the 43rd (Wessex) Infantry Division; 1930–1934	Succeeded by Baptist Crozier
