= South Nottinghamshire =

Parliamentary constituency in the United Kingdom, 1832–1885

- Former county constituency for the House of Commons
- County: Nottinghamshire

1832–1885
- Seats: Two
- Created from: Nottinghamshire
- Replaced by: Rushcliffe, Newark

South Nottinghamshire, formally the "Southern Division of Nottinghamshire" was a county constituency represented in the House of Commons of the Parliament of the United Kingdom. It elected two Members of Parliament (MPs) by the bloc vote system of election.

== Boundaries ==
1832–1885: The Hundreds of Rushcliffe, Bingham, Newark and Thurgarton.

== History ==
The constituency was created by the Reform Act 1832 for the 1832 general election, when the two-seat Nottinghamshire constituency was replaced by the Northern and Southern divisions, each of which elected two MPs.

Both divisions were abolished by the Redistribution of Seats Act 1885 for the 1885 general election, when they were replaced by four new single-seat constituencies: Bassetlaw, Mansfield, Newark and Rushcliffe.

== Members of Parliament ==
Election	1st Member	1st Party	2nd Member	2nd Party
1832	The Earl of Lincoln	Tory	Evelyn Denison	Whig
1834	The Earl of Lincoln	Conservative	Evelyn Denison	Whig
1837	The Earl of Lincoln	Conservative	Lancelot Rolleston	Conservative
1846 by-election	Thomas Thoroton-Hildyard	Conservative	Lancelot Rolleston	Conservative
1849 by-election	Thomas Thoroton-Hildyard	Conservative	Robert Bromley	Conservative
1851 by-election	Thomas Thoroton-Hildyard	Conservative	William Hodgson Barrow	Conservative
1852	Viscount Newark	Conservative	William Hodgson Barrow	Conservative
1860 by-election	Lord Stanhope	Conservative	William Hodgson Barrow	Conservative
1866 by-election	Thomas Thoroton-Hildyard	Conservative	William Hodgson Barrow	Conservative
1874	Thomas Thoroton-Hildyard	Conservative	George Storer	Conservative
1885	Redistribution of Seats Act: constituency abolished			

== Election results ==
=== Elections in the 1830s ===
General election 1832: South Nottinghamshire
Party	Candidate	Votes	%
Tory	Earl of Lincoln	Unopposed	
Whig	Evelyn Denison	Unopposed	
Registered electors		3,170	
Tory win (new seat)			
Whig win (new seat)			

General election 1835: South Nottinghamshire
Party	Candidate	Votes	%
Conservative	Earl of Lincoln	Unopposed	
Whig	Evelyn Denison	Unopposed	
Registered electors		3,432	
Conservative hold			
Whig hold			

General election 1837: South Nottinghamshire
Party	Candidate	Votes	%
Conservative	Earl of Lincoln	Unopposed	
Conservative	Lancelot Rolleston	Unopposed	
Registered electors		3,389	
Conservative hold			
Conservative gain from Whig			

=== Elections in the 1840s ===
General election 1841: South Nottinghamshire
Party	Candidate	Votes	%	±%
Conservative	Earl of Lincoln	Unopposed		
Conservative	Lancelot Rolleston	Unopposed		
Registered electors		3,629		
Conservative hold				
Conservative hold				

Pelham-Clinton was appointed Commissioners of Woods, Forests, Land Revenues, Works and Buildings, requiring a by-election.

By-election, 20 September 1841: South Nottinghamshire
Party	Candidate	Votes	%	±%
Conservative	Earl of Lincoln	Unopposed		
Conservative hold				

Pelham-Clinton was appointed Chief Secretary to the Lord Lieutenant of Ireland, requiring a by-election.

By-election, 27 February 1846: South Nottinghamshire
Party	Candidate	Votes	%	±%
Conservative	Thomas Thoroton-Hildyard	1,736	62.3	N/A
Conservative	Earl of Lincoln	1,049	37.7	N/A
Majority		687	24.6	N/A
Turnout		2,785	80.3	N/A
Registered electors		3,469		
Conservative hold				

General election 1847: South Nottinghamshire
Party	Candidate	Votes	%	±%
Conservative	Thomas Thoroton-Hildyard	Unopposed		
Conservative	Lancelot Rolleston	Unopposed		
Registered electors		3,692		
Conservative hold				
Conservative hold				

Rolleston resigned by accepting the office of Steward of the Chiltern Hundreds, causing a by-election.

By-election, 17 April 1849: South Nottinghamshire
Party	Candidate	Votes	%	±%
Conservative	Robert Bromley	Unopposed		
Conservative hold				

=== Elections in the 1850s ===
Bromley's death caused a by-election.

By-election, 17 February 1851: South Nottinghamshire
Party	Candidate	Votes	%	±%
Conservative	William Hodgson Barrow	1,493	50.2	N/A
Conservative	Sydney Pierrepont	1,482	49.8	N/A
Majority		11	0.4	N/A
Turnout		2,975	78.3	N/A
Registered electors		3,482		
Conservative hold				

General election 1852: South Nottinghamshire
Party	Candidate	Votes	%	±%
Conservative	William Hodgson Barrow	Unopposed		
Conservative	Sydney Pierrepont	Unopposed		
Registered electors		3,801		
Conservative hold				
Conservative hold				

General election 1857: South Nottinghamshire
Party	Candidate	Votes	%	±%
Conservative	William Hodgson Barrow	Unopposed		
Conservative	Sydney Pierrepont	Unopposed		
Registered electors		3,654		
Conservative hold				
Conservative hold				

General election 1859: South Nottinghamshire
Party	Candidate	Votes	%	±%
Conservative	William Hodgson Barrow	Unopposed		
Conservative	Sydney Pierrepont	Unopposed		
Registered electors		3,602		
Conservative hold				
Conservative hold				

=== Elections in the 1860s ===
Pierrepont succeeded to the peerage, becoming Earl Manvers and causing a by-election.

By-election, 18 December 1860: South Nottinghamshire
Party	Candidate	Votes	%	±%
Conservative	George Stanhope	Unopposed		
Conservative hold				

General election 1865: South Nottinghamshire
Party	Candidate	Votes	%	±%
Conservative	William Hodgson Barrow	Unopposed		
Conservative	Lord Stanhope	Unopposed		
Registered electors		3,427		
Conservative hold				
Conservative hold				

Stanhope succeeded to the peerage, becoming 7th Earl of Chesterfield and causing a by-election.

By-election, 18 June 1866: South Nottinghamshire
Party	Candidate	Votes	%	±%
Conservative	Thomas Thoroton-Hildyard	Unopposed		
Conservative hold				

General election 1868: South Nottinghamshire
Party	Candidate	Votes	%	±%
Conservative	William Hodgson Barrow	Unopposed		
Conservative	Thomas Thoroton-Hildyard	Unopposed		
Registered electors		4,846		
Conservative hold				
Conservative hold				

=== Elections in the 1870s ===
General election 1874: South Nottinghamshire
Party	Candidate	Votes	%	±%
Conservative	George Storer	Unopposed		
Conservative	Thomas Thoroton-Hildyard	Unopposed		
Registered electors		4,978		
Conservative hold				
Conservative hold				

=== Elections in the 1880s ===
General election 1880: South Nottinghamshire
Party	Candidate	Votes	%	±%
Conservative	George Storer	2,491	40.4	N/A
Conservative	Thomas Thoroton-Hildyard	2,227	36.1	N/A
Liberal	Samuel Bristowe	1,445	23.4	New
Majority		782	12.7	N/A
Turnout		3,804 (est)	78.0 (est)	N/A
Registered electors		4,879		
Conservative hold		Swing	N/A	
Conservative hold		Swing	N/A	

== Sources ==
- Leigh Rayment's Historical List of MPs – Constituencies beginning with "N" (part 3)
- Craig, F. W. S. (1989) [1977]. British parliamentary election results 1832–1885 (2nd ed.). Chichester: Parliamentary Research Services. p. 440. ISBN 0-900178-26-4.
