= Alexander Rochfort =

British Army general

Major-General Sir Alexander Rochfort KCB CMG
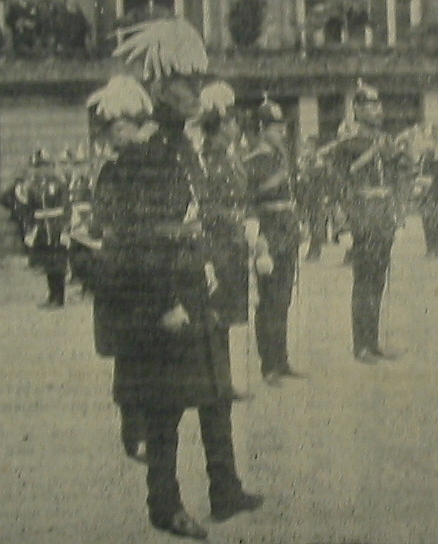
- Born: Alexander Nelson Rochfort; 3 June 1850; Clogrennane, County Carlow, Ireland
- Died: 5 December 1916 (aged 66); Piccadilly, London
- Military career
- Allegiance: United Kingdom
- Branch: British Army
- Service years: 1871–1916
- Rank: Major-General
- Conflicts: Second Boer War; World War I
- Awards: Knight Commander of the Order of the Bath; Companion of the Order of St Michael and St George

Major-General Sir Alexander Nelson Rochfort, KCB, CMG (3 June 1850 – 5 December 1916) was a British Army officer who became Lieutenant Governor of Jersey.

== Early life ==
Rochfort was born in County Carlow, Ireland, the fifth son of Horace William Noel Rochfort and Hon. Charlotte Hood, daughter of Samuel Hood, 2nd Baron Bridport.

== Military career ==
Rochfort was commissioned into the Royal Artillery as a lieutenant on 4 January 1871, and promoted to captain on 9 March 1881. He was appointed Aide de camp to the Viceroy of India in 1882 and then Aide de camp to the Chief of Staff of the Expeditionary Force to Suakin in 1885, and subsequently promoted to major on 15 Jun 1885 and lieutenant-colonel on 2 December 1896. Posted to South Africa after the outbreak of the Second Boer War in October 1899, he was present at the Relief of Kimberley and at the Battle of Paardeberg, was mentioned in despatches (31 March 1900) and was severely wounded in his arm. During the latter part of the war, he was in command of a column operating in the north-west of Orange River Colony. In despatches dated 23 June 1902, Lord Kitchener, Commander-in-Chief in South Africa, described Rochfort as "fearless of responsibility, never makes difficulties, and has ... all the qualifications for a leader in the field." Following the end of the war with the Peace of Vereeniging on 31 May 1902, he returned home on the SS Saxon which arrived at Southampton in late October 1902. For his service he was appointed a Companion of the Order of the Bath (CB).

He was placed on half-pay from his regiment in October 1902, but soon went back to Africa to be a Special Service Officer in the Somaliland campaign, attached to the Abyssinian army which cooperated with the British Field Force. He returned to become Inspector of the Royal Horse Artillery and Royal Field Artillery in 1904.

He was appointed Lieutenant Governor of Jersey in 1910, serving as such until he retired in October 1916. He was found dead at his chambers in Piccadilly in December 1916.

Government offices
Preceded by Hugh Gough	Lieutenant Governor of Jersey; 1910–1916	Succeeded by Sir Alexander Wilson
