= Henry Hildyard =

British Army general (1846–1916)

General Sir Henry Hildyard GCB
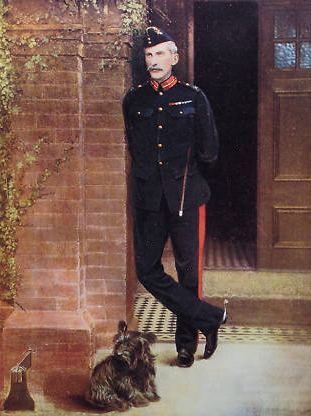
- Hildyard in 1900
- Born: 5 July 1846
- Died: 25 July 1916 (aged 70); Aspley Heath, Bedfordshire
- Burial place: St Michaels church, Aspley Heath
- Relatives: Thomas Thoroton-Hildyard (father); Reginald Hildyard (son)
- Military career
- Allegiance: United Kingdom
- Branch: Royal Navy (1859–1864); British Army (1867–1916)
- Service years: 1859–1916
- Rank: General
- Commands: General Officer Commanding South Africa; 5th Infantry Division; 2nd Infantry Brigade; 3rd Infantry Brigade
- Conflicts: Anglo-Egyptian War; Battle of Tel el-Kebir; Battle of Kassassin; Second Boer War; Battle of Colenso; Battle of the Tugela Heights
- Awards: Knight Grand Cross of the Order of the Bath; Mentioned in Despatches

General Sir Henry John Thoroton Hildyard, GCB (5 July 1846 – 25 July 1916) was a British Army officer who saw active service in the Anglo-Egyptian War of 1882 and the Second Boer War. He was General Officer Commanding-in-Chief, South Africa, from 1905 to 1908.

== Early life ==
The youngest of the three sons of Thomas Blackborne Thoroton-Hildyard, a member of parliament, of Flintham Hall, Flintham, near Newark, Hildyard was educated at Burney's Royal Naval Academy, Gosport. His brothers were Thomas Blackborne Thoroton Hildyard (1843–1928) and Robert Charles Thoroton Hildyard (1844–1885).

== Military career ==
Hildyard entered the Royal Navy as a midshipman and served in the navy from 1859 to 1864. In 1867, he joined the British Army, as an ensign in the 5th Northumberland Fusiliers, later transferring to the Highland Light Infantry, in which he was lieutenant and adjutant for nearly seven years, and in 1876 was promoted captain. In 1877 he passed the Staff College and transferred into the Somerset Light Infantry, was promoted major in 1882 and brevet lieutenant colonel later the same year; colonel in 1886, and a temporary major general in 1898, made substantive the following year.

Hildyard served with the Egyptian Expedition of 1882 as Deputy Assistant Adjutant and Quartermaster General, and was at Kassassin and Tel el-Kebir, where he was mentioned in despatches, was employed with the Egyptian Army from 1883 to 1888, and was appointed an aide-de-camp to Queen Victoria in 1886. From 1893 to 1898 he was on home postings, as Deputy Assistant Adjutant-General and Assistant Adjutant-General at Headquarters, then as Assistant Adjutant-General at Aldershot and as Commandant of the Staff College, then commanded the 3rd Brigade at Aldershot from 1898 to 1899.

=== Second Boer War and South Africa command ===
During the Second Boer War, Hildyard was posted to South Africa and commanded the 2nd Infantry Brigade from its embarkation in late October 1899 to April 1900, again being mentioned in despatches and seeing active service at the Battle of Colenso. On 8 January 1900, Winston Churchill, in the theatre of war as a special correspondent, asked Hildyard what formation his 2nd Brigade was in, and he replied "Formation for taking advantage of ant-heaps".

Hildyard remained in South Africa to command the 5th Infantry Division from April 1900 to 1901, during which time he took part in the Battle of the Tugela Heights. In October 1901 he returned to the United Kingdom as a lieutenant general temporary in command of the 1st Army Corps (the Aldershot Command), pending the return from South Africa of Sir John French, who was to receive the command in succession to General Sir Redvers Buller, recently dismissed. French returned to the United Kingdom after the war had formally ended in June 1902, but did not relieve Hildyard of the command until 15 September 1902.

The following year Hildyard was appointed to the new post of Director-General of Military Education and Training, serving only a year until 1904, when he became lieutenant general on the Imperial General Staff commanding troops in South Africa, 1904 to 1905. He was General Officer Commanding-in-Chief, South Africa, from 1905 to 1908, and retired from service on 19 March 1911.

In 1903, Hildyard had been appointed Colonel of the Highland Light Infantry and he continued to serve at the head of the regiment until his death in 1916, when he was succeeded by Sir William Pitcairn Campbell.

== Private life ==
In 1871, Hildyard married Annette, the daughter of Admiral James Charles Prevost, and they had three sons, Harold Charles Thoroton Hildyard (born 1872), Gerald Moresby Thoroton Hildyard (1874–1956) and General Sir Reginald John Thoroton Hildyard (1876–1965), and one daughter, Edith Mary Thoroton Hildyard, who in 1895 married Edward Bromley, a lawyer.

Hildyard died on 25 July 1916. At the time of his death he was living at Aspley Heath, Bedfordshire, and was buried there at St Michael's church on 29 July. His widow was buried with him on 19 February 1919, from 3, St Catherine's Road, Littlehampton.

== Publication ==
- Henry John Thoroton Hildyard, Historical Record of the Seventy-First Regiment, Highland Light Infantry (Reissued in paperback by Kessinger Publishing, 2007)

== Decorations ==
Most Honourable Order of the Bath

- CB: Companion – 1897 (1897 Diamond Jubilee Honours)
- KCB: Knight Commander – 29 November 1900 – in recognition of services in connection with the Campaign in South Africa 1899–1900
- GCB: Knight Grand Cross – 1911 (1911 Coronation Honours)

== Notes ==
Military offices
| Preceded by Francis Clery | Commandant of the Staff College, Camberley; 1893–1898 | Succeeded by Herbert Miles |
