= Flintham =

Village in Nottinghamshire, England

Coordinates: 52°59′N 0°54′W

- Village and civil parish
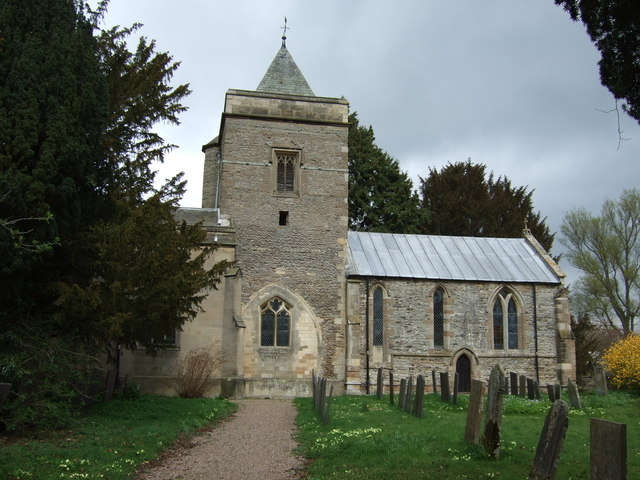
- St Augustine of Canterbury Church, Flintham

- Location within Nottinghamshire
- Interactive map of Flintham
- Area: 3.19 sq mi (8.3 km^{2})
- Population: 563 (2021 census)
  - Density: 176/sq mi (68/km^{2})
- OS grid reference: SK 740462
  - London: 110 mi (180 km) SSE
- District: Rushcliffe
- Shire county: Nottinghamshire
- Region: East Midlands
- Country: England
- Sovereign state: United Kingdom
- Post town: NEWARK
- Postcode district: NG23
- Dialling code: 01636
- Police: Nottinghamshire
- Fire: Nottinghamshire
- Ambulance: East Midlands
- UK Parliament: Newark
- Website: flinthamvillage.org.uk

Flintham is a village and civil parish in the Rushcliffe district in Nottinghamshire, 7 miles (11 km) from Newark-on-Trent and opposite RAF Syerston on the A46. It had a population of 597 at the 2011 census, estimated at 586 in 2019, and a fall to 563 at the 2021 census. The village name was taken by the Ham class minesweeper HMS Flintham.

== Amenities ==
The Grade I listed Anglican church is dedicated to St Augustine of Canterbury and has "a Victorian nave attached to a Norman tower and chancel." It now belongs to the Fosse Group of parishes, with St Peter's Church, East Bridgford, St Helen's Church, Kneeton, St Wilfrid's Church, Screveton, and St Mary's Church, Car Colston. A service is held about once a month.

The village has a primary school, currently closed, a village hall (the old school building), and a cricket pavilion. Its one pub, the Boot and Shoe Inn, is in Main Street. There is also a voluntarily run Flintham Community Shop and a museum of rural life. Several gardens are normally open to the public for a summer weekend each year.

Flintham Football Club was founded in 1969, however, it was rebranded 3BFC in 2011 and moved out of the village.

== Etymology ==
The place-name Flintham seems to contain an Old English personal name, Flinta, + hām (Old English), a village, a manor, an estate or a homestead, so probably, "Flinta's homestead or village". The hard grey rock, flint, does not exist in the neighbourhood.

== Heritage ==
White's Directory of Nottinghamshire described Flintham in 1853 as:

"a pleasant and well-built village, 6½ miles south-west by south of Newark, including within its parish 637 inhabitants and 2,110 acres (8.5 km^{2}) of rich loamy land, at a rateable value of £3,324, which was enclosed about the year 1780, when 172 acres (0.70 km^{2}) were allotted to the vicar, and about 300 acres (1.2 km^{2}) to Trinity College, in lieu of tithes, exclusive of 165 acres (0.67 km^{2}) which had previously belonged to the said college. The greater part of the parish belongs to Thomas Blackborne Thoroton Hildyard Esq., but Francis Fryer Esq., Richard Hall Esq. and John Clark Esq. have also estates here. The Duke of Newcastle is lord of the manor, which he holds in fee of the King's Duchy of Lancaster, together with several others in this neighbourhood. His Grace has no land here except 6 acres (2.4 ha) allotted to him at the enclosure. Flintham Hall, which has been successively the seat of the Husseys, Hackers, Woodhouses, Disneys, (Note: The Disneys who formerly held Flintham were related to the Hildyard family of Yorkshire.) Fytches and Thorotons, is now the residence of Thomas Blackborne Thoroton Hildyard Esq. It is a handsome modern edifice, erected on the site of the ancient mansion. It owes many of its present beauties to the late Col. Hildyard."

=== Hildyard family ===
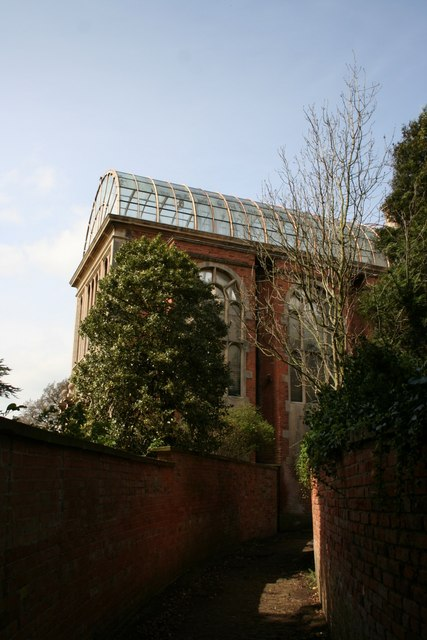
Victorian conservatory, Flintham Hall

Col. Thomas Blackborne Thoroton Hildyard (1752–1814), was MP for Grantham. As a colonel in the Coldstream Guards, Thoroton Hildyard served with British forces in the American War of Independence. He was also a longstanding friend and advisor to John Manners, 3rd Duke of Rutland, to whom he was related. His grandson Thomas Blackborne Thoroton Hildyard (1821–1888), son of Thomas Blackborne Hildyard (1788–1830), also lived at Flintham Hall and was educated at Eton and Oxford.

In 1846 Hildyard entered political life as the Conservative Member of Parliament for the southern division of Nottinghamshire. It was a toughly contested election. Hildyard was supported, according to the University of Nottingham, by the 4th Duke of Newcastle-under-Lyme "in spite of the fact that Newcastle's son, the Earl of Lincoln, was his opponent. Lincoln attacked Hildyard's youth and inexperience, but the 'young squire' still defeated him by a majority of almost 700. Hildyard held South Nottinghamshire from 1846 until 1852. He was re-elected in 1866. He then continued to represent the South Nottinghamshire constituency until his retirement in 1885."

The name of the Hildyard family of Flintham was initially Thoroton. Col. Hildyard, father of MP Hildyard, was formerly called Thomas Blackborne Thoroton. The second son of Thomas Hildyard, formerly Thomas Thoroton, took holy orders and became a rector. In 1816 the Rev. Levett Thoroton married in London the daughter of Sir Alexander Cray Grant, 8th Baronet of Dalvey, Elgin, Scotland, and MP. Rev. Levett Thoroton later became a rector in the East Riding of Yorkshire, where his family owned land, but changed his name to Hildyard in 1815 on marrying a Hildyard heiress, the niece of Sir Robert d'Arcy Hildyard, 4th and last Baronet, who died without issue leaving his estate to his niece. Col. Thoroton Hildyard was descended from Mary (Levett) Blackborne, who was the daughter of Sir Richard Levett, Lord Mayor of London and the widow of merchant Abraham Blackborne, and her second husband Robert Thoroton of Screveton Hall, Nottinghamshire. (Robert Thoroton and his wife Mary became parties to a contentious lawsuit with the Blackborne family heirs — Thoroton vs. Blackborne — over an enormous estate left by William Hewer, longtime friend of diarist and Secretary of the Admiralty Samuel Pepys.)

=== Myles Thoroton Hildyard ===
In 2005 the family's best-known representative, Myles Thoroton Hildyard, landowner and historian, died at Flintham. Hildyard, a Cambridge-educated landowner and historian, won the Military Cross for a daring escape from a prisoner-of-war camp after the Battle of Crete. He also became known for his work at Flintham Hall, a Grade I listed house, which The Independent noted in its obituary of Hildyard, has been described as "perhaps the most gloriously romantic Victorian house in England." Hildyard became known in the community for his good fellowship. "Flintham was, for the years Myles Hildyard was its guardian," noted The Independent in its obituary, "a most remarkable place to visit. Not just because of the beauty and richness of its physical surroundings, but also because he himself was so remarkable a person. 'He was, in a way,' writes Antony Beevor, 'the local equivalent of Nancy Mitford's Lord Merlin.' At Flintham he encouraged and received a stream of visitors young and old, who brought lively conversation, stimulation and enjoyment to a house which, when his father inherited, had been a rather forbidding and lifeless place."

=== Flintham Hall ===
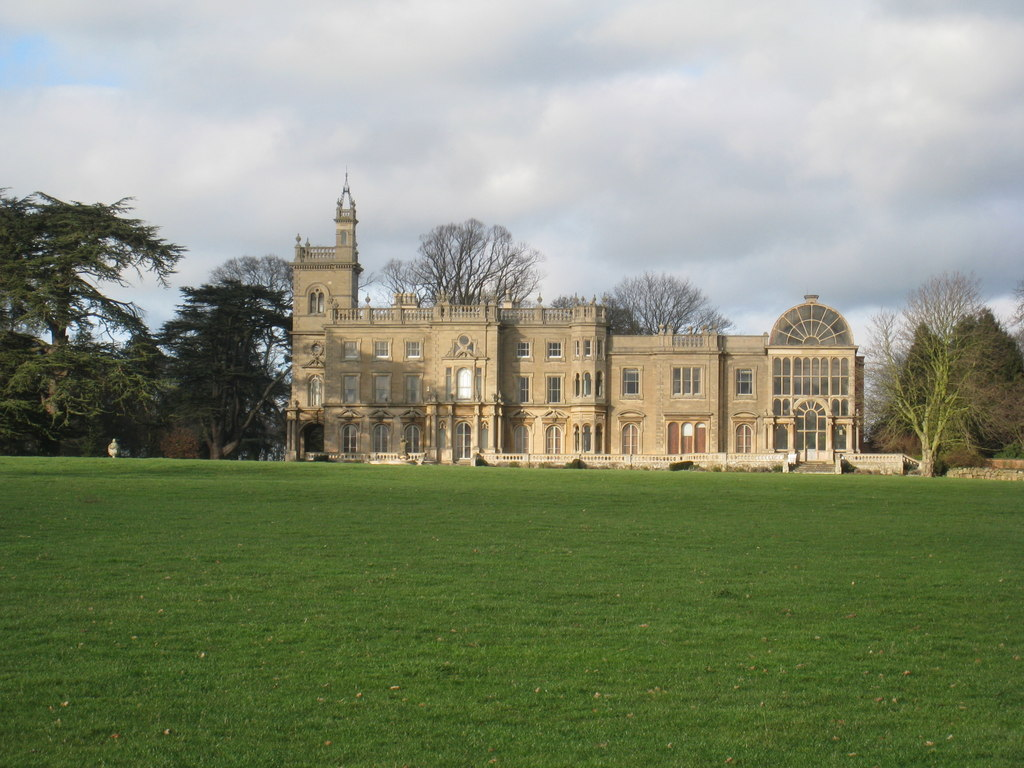
Flintham Hall

Flintham Hall is a Grade I listed country house in the Flintham estate, on the western edge of Flintham village. It was built in 1798 on the site of an earlier house bought from the Disney family by Thomas Thoroton in 1789. It was extended in 1820–1830 by the architect Lewis Wyatt for the British Army Colonel. T. Thoroton and again remodelled in 1853–1859 by George Thomas Hine for Thomas Blackborne Thoroton Hildyard. It is built on two and three storeys, 11 bays wide and 3 bays deep with an attached glassed Victorian conservatory. The conservatory, influenced by London's Crystal Palace, is the finest of its type left in England.

The Thoroton Hildyard family continues to reside at the Hall. Flintham Hall, now the home of Myles's nephew Sir Robert Hildyard and his wife Lucy, was recently chief location for "Easy Virtue," a movie based on the Noël Coward play. It was also used in And When Did You Last See Your Father?, a film starring Jim Broadbent and Colin Firth, directed by Anand Tucker,

The village has a circular brick pinfold resembling those at Screveton and Scarrington. A windmill stood in Broad Marsh field from 1779 to 1847 (grid reference SK742462).

=== Plough Boy's play ===
Flintham is one of twenty or so places in Nottinghamshire where the local historian Maurice Barley (1909–1991) found evidence of a traditional English Plough Boy's Play being performed. It consists of 151 lines of text and involves seven characters. It was last performed in Flintham in 1925. It was more recently revived by the Foresters Morris Men in September 2014 with schoolboys from Flintham, and performed at Nottingham Castle and around.

== See also ==
- Listed buildings in Flintham
