= Horatio Nelson, 1st Viscount Nelson =

Royal Navy officer (1758–1805)

Vice-Admiral The Right Honourable The Viscount Nelson KB
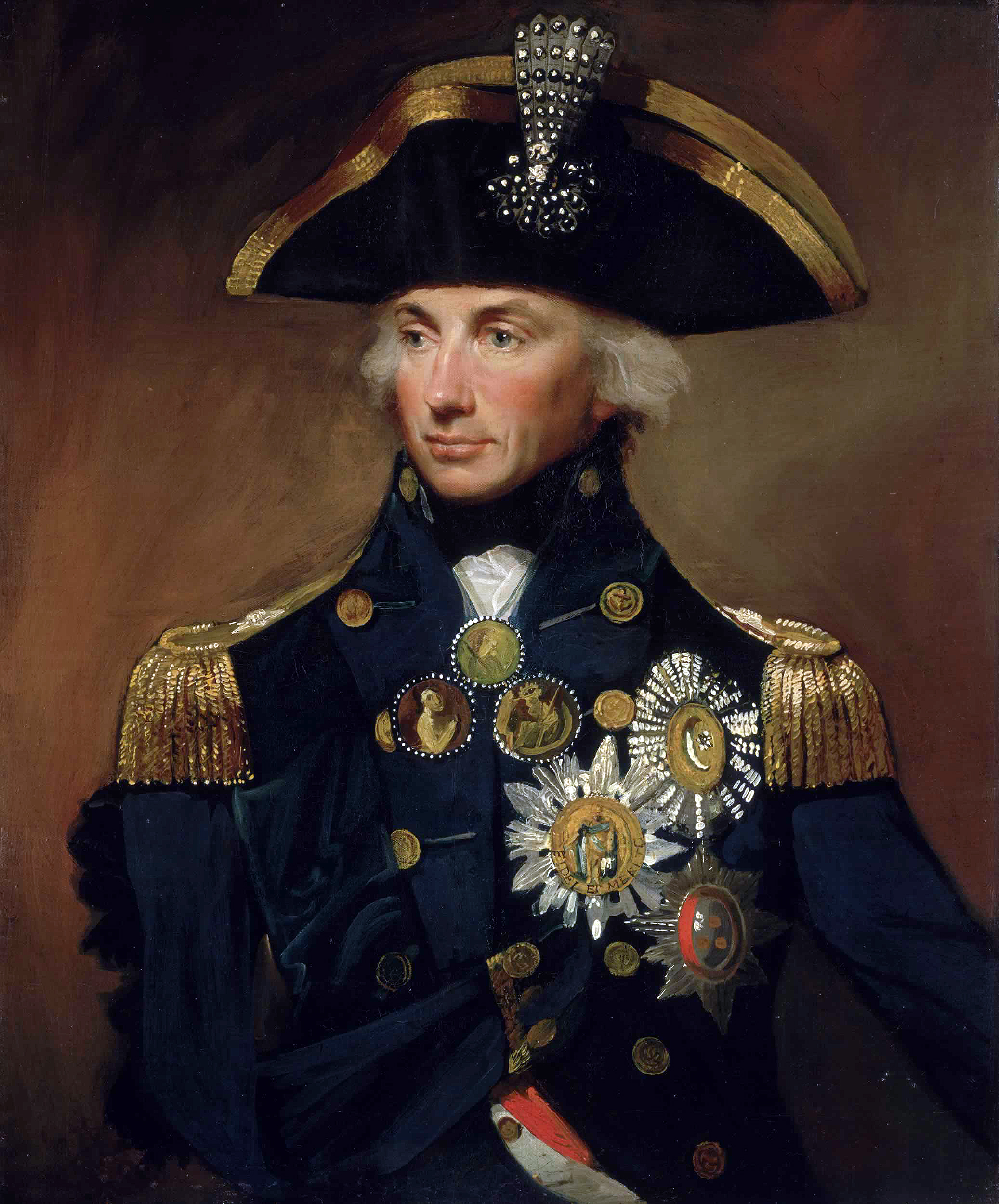
- Portrait of Horatio Nelson, 1799
- Born: 29 September 1758; Burnham Thorpe, Norfolk, England, Great Britain
- Died: 21 October 1805 (aged 47); HMS Victory, off Cape Trafalgar, Spain
- Cause of death: Gunshot wound
- Burial place: St Paul's Cathedral, London, England, U.K.
- Spouse: Frances Nisbet (m. 1787)
- Children: Horatia Nelson
- Parents: Edmund Nelson (father); Catherine Suckling (mother)
- Military career
- Allegiance: Great Britain; United Kingdom
- Branch: Royal Navy
- Service years: 1771–1805
- Rank: Vice-Admiral of the White
- Commands: Fort Charles; HMS Badger; HMS Hinchinbrook; HMS Janus; HMS Albemarle; HMS Boreas; HMS Agamemnon; HMS Captain; HMS Vanguard; HMS Victory; Mediterranean Fleet
- Conflicts: First Anglo-Maratha War; American War of Independence; Battle of Fort San Juan; Battle of Grand Turk; French Revolutionary Wars; Siege of Toulon; Action of 22 October 1793; Siege of Bastia; Siege of Calvi (WIA); Battle of Genoa (1795); Battle of Hyères Islands; Action of 31 May 1796; Action of 19 December 1796; Battle of Cape St. Vincent (1797) (WIA); Assault on Cádiz (1797); Battle of Santa Cruz de Tenerife (1797) (WIA); Battle of the Nile (WIA); Battle of the Malta Convoy; Siege of Malta (1798–1800); Battle of Copenhagen (1801); Raid on Boulogne (1801); Napoleonic Wars; Battle of Trafalgar †
- Awards: See below

Vice-Admiral of the White Horatio Nelson, 1st Viscount Nelson (29 September 1758 – 21 October 1805) was a British Royal Navy officer whose leadership, grasp of strategy and unconventional tactics led to multiple decisive naval victories during the French Revolutionary and Napoleonic Wars. He is widely regarded as one of the greatest admirals in history.

Nelson was born into a moderately prosperous Norfolk family and joined the British navy in 1771 through the influence of his uncle Maurice Suckling, a post-captain in the Royal Navy. Developing a reputation for valour and a firm grasp of tactics, Nelson obtained his first command in 1778 but suffered from bouts of illness and following the end of the American War of Independence in 1783 was put on half-pay. Britain's entry into the French Revolutionary Wars in 1793 allowed him to return to active service and participate in the siege of Toulon and invasion of Corsica, the latter of which resulted in Nelson partially losing sight in his right eye. Rising rapidly through the ranks in 1797 Nelson distinguished himself at the Battle of Cape St. Vincent and shortly afterwards took part in a failed attack on Santa Cruz de Tenerife at which he lost his right arm, forcing him to return to England to recuperate. In 1798 Nelson won a decisive victory at the Battle of the Nile but subsequently became involved in Neapolitan politics and began an affair with Emma Hamilton, both of which severely damaged his reputation in his navy, leading to a period of inactivity.

In 1801 Nelson was sent to the Baltic Sea and helped to break up the Second League of Armed Neutrality by defeating a Danish fleet at the Battle of Copenhagen. His career was again interrupted by the Peace of Amiens in 1802 but after the Napoleonic Wars began in 1803 he soon resumed active service. Nelson commanded the British fleet which blockaded a Franco-Spanish fleet at Toulon, and after the allied fleet escaped pursued it to the West Indies and back but failed to bring about a battle. After a brief return to England, Nelson took over the British fleet blockading Cádiz in 1805. On 21 October the Franco-Spanish fleet in Cádiz came out of port and Nelson's fleet engaged them at the Battle of Trafalgar. The battle was a decisive British victory, but Nelson, aboard HMS Victory, was fatally wounded by a French marksman. His body was brought back to England and given a state funeral.

Nelson's death at Trafalgar had secured his position as one of Britain's national heroes. His signal just prior to the commencement of the battle, "England expects that every man will do his duty", has been widely quoted and paraphrased. Numerous monuments, including Nelson's Column at Trafalgar Square in London and the Nelson Monument in Edinburgh, have been created to honour him. In 2002, Nelson was ranked 9th out of the 100 Greatest Britons of all time.

== Early life ==
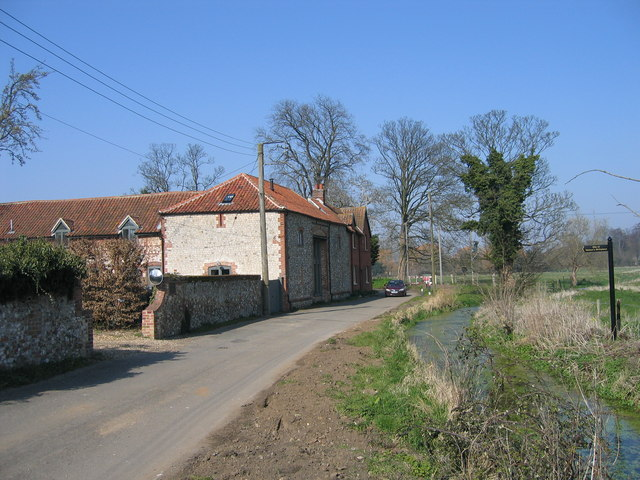
The site of the rectory in Burnham Thorpe in Norfolk, where Nelson was born in 1758

Horatio Nelson was born on 29 September 1758 at a rectory in Burnham Thorpe, Norfolk, England; the sixth of eleven children of the Reverend Edmund Nelson and his wife Catherine Suckling. He was named "Horatio" after his godfather Horatio Walpole, 1st Earl of Orford. Horatio Walpole was a nephew of Robert Walpole, 1st Earl of Orford, the de facto first prime minister of Great Britain. Nelson retained a strong Christian faith throughout his life. Nelson's maternal uncle Maurice Suckling was a high-ranking naval officer, and is believed to have had a major impact on Nelson's life.

Nelson attended Paston Grammar School in North Walsham until he was 12 years old, and also attended King Edward VI's Grammar School in Norwich. His naval career began on 1 January 1771, when he reported to the third-rate HMS Raisonnable as an ordinary seaman and coxswain under Suckling, who commanded the vessel. Shortly after reporting aboard, Nelson was appointed a midshipman and began officer training. Early in his service, Nelson discovered he experienced seasickness, a chronic issue he experienced for the rest of his life.

== East and West Indies, 1771–1780 ==
Raisonnable was commissioned during a period of tension with Spain, but when it passed, Suckling was transferred to the Nore guardship HMS Triumph. Nelson was dispatched to serve aboard the West Indiaman Mary Ann of the merchant shipping firm Hibbert, Purrier and Horton, in order to gain experience at sea. He sailed from Medway in Kent on 25 July 1771, heading to Jamaica and Tobago, and returning to Plymouth on 7 July 1772. He crossed the Atlantic twice before returning to serve under his uncle as the commander of his longboat, which carried sailors and dispatches to and from shore. Nelson then learnt of a planned expedition commanded by Constantine Phipps, intended to survey a passage in the Arctic by which it was hoped India could be reached: the fabled North-East Passage.

At his nephew's request, Suckling arranged for Nelson to join the expedition as coxswain, under Commander Skeffington Lutwidge aboard the converted bomb vessel, HMS Carcass. The expedition reached within ten degrees of the North Pole, however, unable to find a way through the dense ice floes, it was forced to turn back. By 1800, Lutwidge had begun to circulate a story that Nelson spotted and pursued a polar bear while the ship was trapped in the ice, before he was ordered to return to the ship. Later, in 1809, Lutwidge said Nelson and a companion gave chase to the bear and upon being questioned why, replied: "I wished, Sir, to get the skin for my father." Nelson briefly returned to Triumph after the expedition returned to Britain in September 1773. Suckling then arranged for his transfer to HMS Seahorse; one of two ships about to sail for the East Indies.

Nelson sailed for the East Indies on 19 November 1773, and arrived at the British outpost at Madras on 25 May 1774. Nelson and Seahorse spent the rest of the year cruising off the coast and escorting merchantmen. With the outbreak of the First Anglo-Maratha War, the British fleet operated in support of the East India Company. In early 1775, Seahorse was dispatched to carry a cargo of the company's money to Bombay. On 19 February, two of Hyder Ali's ketches attacked Seahorse, which drove them off after a brief exchange of fire. This was Nelson's first experience of battle. Nelson spent the rest of the year escorting convoys and continued to develop his navigation and ship handling skills. In early 1776, he contracted malaria and became seriously ill. He was discharged from Seahorse on 14 March and returned to England aboard HMS Dolphin. Nelson spent the six-month voyage recuperating and had almost recovered by the time he arrived in Britain in September. His patron Suckling had risen to the post of Comptroller of the Navy in 1775, and used his influence to help Nelson gain further promotion. Nelson was appointed acting lieutenant aboard HMS Worcester, which was about to sail to Gibraltar.

Worcester, commanded by Captain Mark Robinson, sailed as a convoy escort on 3 December, and returned with another convoy in April 1777. Nelson then travelled to London to take his lieutenant's examination on 9 April; his examining board consisted of Captains John Campbell, Abraham North, and his uncle Suckling. Nelson passed the examination, and the next day received his commission and an appointment to HMS Lowestoffe, which was preparing to sail to Jamaica under Captain William Locker. She sailed on 16 May, arrived on 19 July, and after reprovisioning, carried out several cruises in Caribbean waters. After the outbreak of the American War of Independence, Lowestoffe took several prizes, one of which was taken into Navy service as Little Lucy. Nelson asked for and was given command of her, and took her on two cruises of his own.

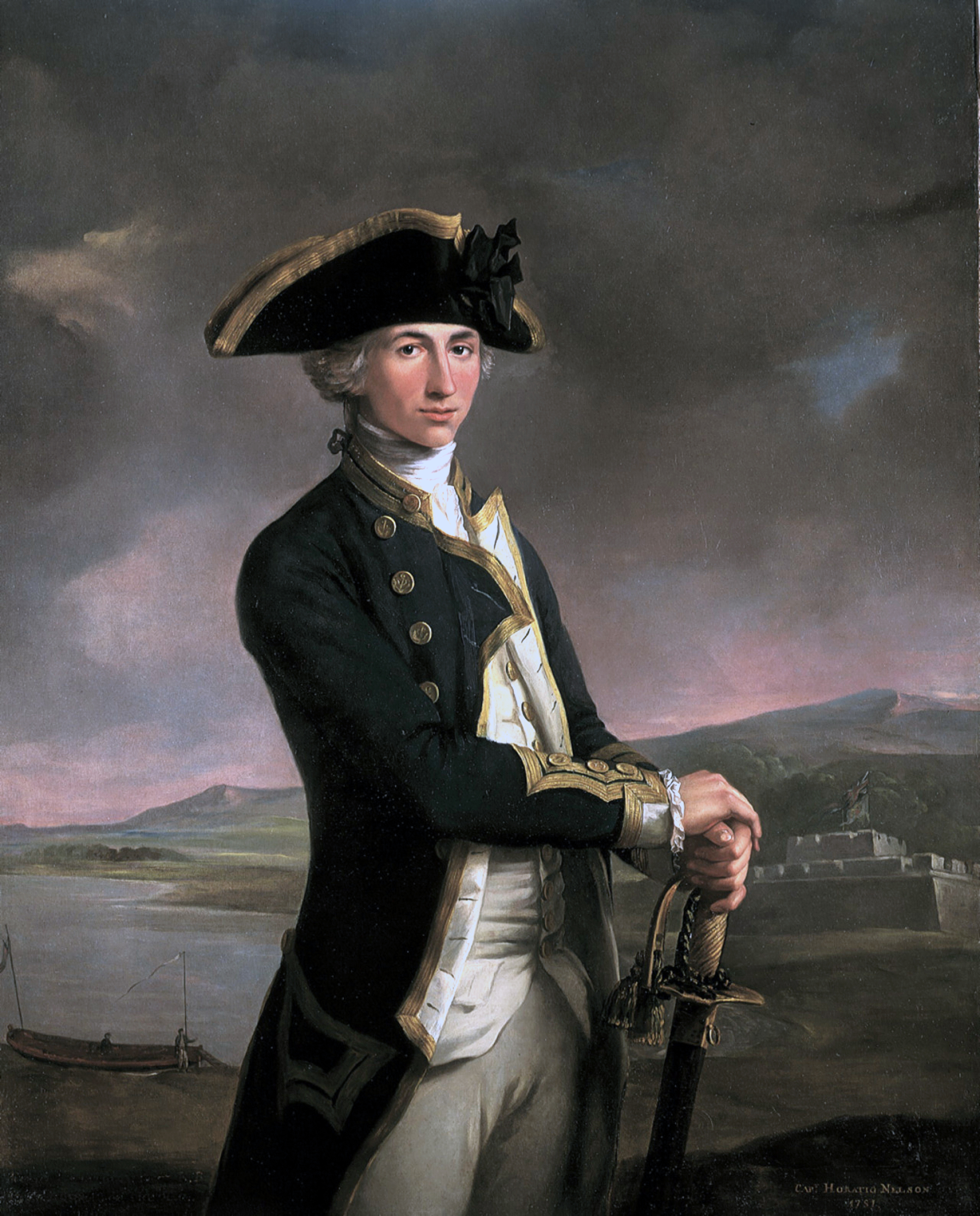
Captain Horatio Nelson, painted by John Francis Rigaud in 1781, with Fort San Juan—the scene of his most notable achievement till then—in the background.

As well as giving him his first command, it gave Nelson the opportunity to explore his fledgling interest in science. During his first cruise commanding Little Lucy, Nelson led an expedition to the Caicos Islands, where he made detailed notes of the wildlife, and in particular a bird now believed to be the white-necked jacobin. Locker, impressed by Nelson's abilities, recommended him to the new commander-in-chief at Jamaica, Sir Peter Parker. Parker duly took Nelson onto his flagship HMS Bristol. The entry of the French into the war in support of the Americans meant further targets for Parker's fleet. It took many prizes towards the end of 1778, which brought Nelson an estimated £400 (equivalent to £55,100 in 2025) in prize money. Parker appointed him as master and commander of the brig HMS Badger on 8 December.

Nelson and Badger spent most of 1779 cruising off of the Central American coast, ranging as far as the British settlements at British Honduras (present day Belize), and Nicaragua, but without much success at interception of enemy prizes. On his return to Port Royal, he learnt Parker had promoted him to post-captain on 11 June, and intended to give him another command. Nelson handed over the Badger to Cuthbert Collingwood while he awaited the arrival of his new ship: the 28-gun frigate HMS Hinchinbrook, newly captured from the French. While Nelson waited, news reached Parker of a French fleet commanded by Charles Hector, comte d'Estaing approaching Jamaica. Parker hastily organised his defences and had placed Nelson in command of the huge Fort Charles, which covered the approaches to Kingston. D'Estaing instead headed north, as he was ordered to besiege Savannah, and the anticipated invasion never materialised.

Nelson took command of the Hinchinbrook on 1 September 1779. Hinchinbrook sailed from Port Royal on 5 October and, in company with other British ships, proceeded to capture a number of American prizes. On his return to Jamaica in December, Nelson began to be troubled by recurrent attacks of malaria. Nelson remained in the West Indies in order to take part in Major-General John Dalling's attempt to capture the Spanish colonies in Central America, including an assault on the Fortress of the Immaculate Conception on the San Juan River in Nicaragua. In February 1780, Hinchinbrook sailed from Jamaica as an escort for Dalling's invasion force. After sailing up the mouth of the San Juan River, Nelson's expeditionary force obtained the surrender of the Fortress of the Immaculate Conception and its 160 Spanish defenders after a two-week siege. Despite this initial success, the British forces never reached Lake Nicaragua and, decimated by yellow fever, were forced to return to Jamaica. The British destroyed the fortress when they evacuated in January 1781. The failed campaign led to more than 2,500 casualties, making it the costliest British disaster of the entire war. Despite this, Nelson was praised for his efforts.

Parker recalled Nelson and gave him command of the 44-gun frigate HMS Janus. In 1780, Nelson fell seriously ill, possibly with dysentery, or yellow fever, in the jungles of Costa Rica, and was unable to assume command. He was taken to Kingston, Jamaica, to be nursed by "doctoress" Cubah Cornwallis. He was discharged in August and returned to Britain aboard HMS Lion, arriving in late November. Nelson gradually recovered over several months, and soon began agitating for a command. He was appointed to the frigate HMS Albemarle on 15 August 1781.

== Command, 1781–1796 ==
=== Captain of Albemarle ===
Nelson received orders on 23 October 1781 to take the newly refitted Albemarle to sea. He was instructed to collect an inbound convoy of the Russia Company at Elsinore and escort them back to Britain. For this operation, the Admiralty placed the frigates HMS Argo and HMS Enterprise under his command. Nelson successfully organised the convoy and escorted it into British waters. He then left the convoy to return to port, but severe storms hampered him. Gales almost wrecked Albemarle, as she was a poorly designed ship and an earlier accident had left her damaged, but Nelson eventually brought her into Portsmouth in February 1782. There, the Admiralty ordered him to fit Albemarle for sea and join the escort for a convoy collecting at Cork to sail for Quebec. Nelson arrived off Newfoundland with the convoy in late May, then detached on a cruise to hunt American privateers. Nelson was generally unsuccessful; he succeeded only in retaking several captured British merchant ships and capturing a number of small fishing boats and assorted craft.

In August 1782, Nelson had a narrow escape from a far superior French force under Louis-Philippe de Vaudreuil, only evading them after a prolonged chase. Nelson arrived at Quebec on 18 September. He sailed again as part of the escort for a convoy to New York. He arrived in mid-November and reported to Admiral Samuel Hood, commander of the New York station. At Nelson's request, Hood transferred him to his fleet and Albemarle sailed in company with Hood, bound for the West Indies. On their arrival, the British fleet took up positions off Jamaica to await the arrival of de Vaudreuil's force. Nelson and the Albemarle were ordered to scout the numerous passages for signs of the enemy, but by early 1783 it became clear the French had eluded Hood.

During his scouting operations, Nelson had developed a plan to attack the French garrison of the Turks Islands. Commanding a small flotilla of frigates and smaller vessels, he landed a force of 167 sailors and marines early on the morning of 8 March under a supporting bombardment. The French were found to be heavily entrenched and, after several hours, Nelson called off the assault. Several officers involved criticised Nelson, but Hood does not appear to have reprimanded him. Nelson spent the rest of the war cruising in the West Indies, where he captured a number of French and Spanish prizes. After news of the peace reached Hood, Nelson returned to Britain in late June 1783.

=== Island of Nevis, marriage and peace ===
Nelson visited France in late 1783 and stayed with acquaintances at Saint-Omer, briefly attempting to learn French during his stay. He returned to England in January 1784 and attended court as part of Lord Hood's entourage. Influenced by the factional politics of the time, he contemplated standing for Parliament as a supporter of William Pitt, but was unable to find a seat.

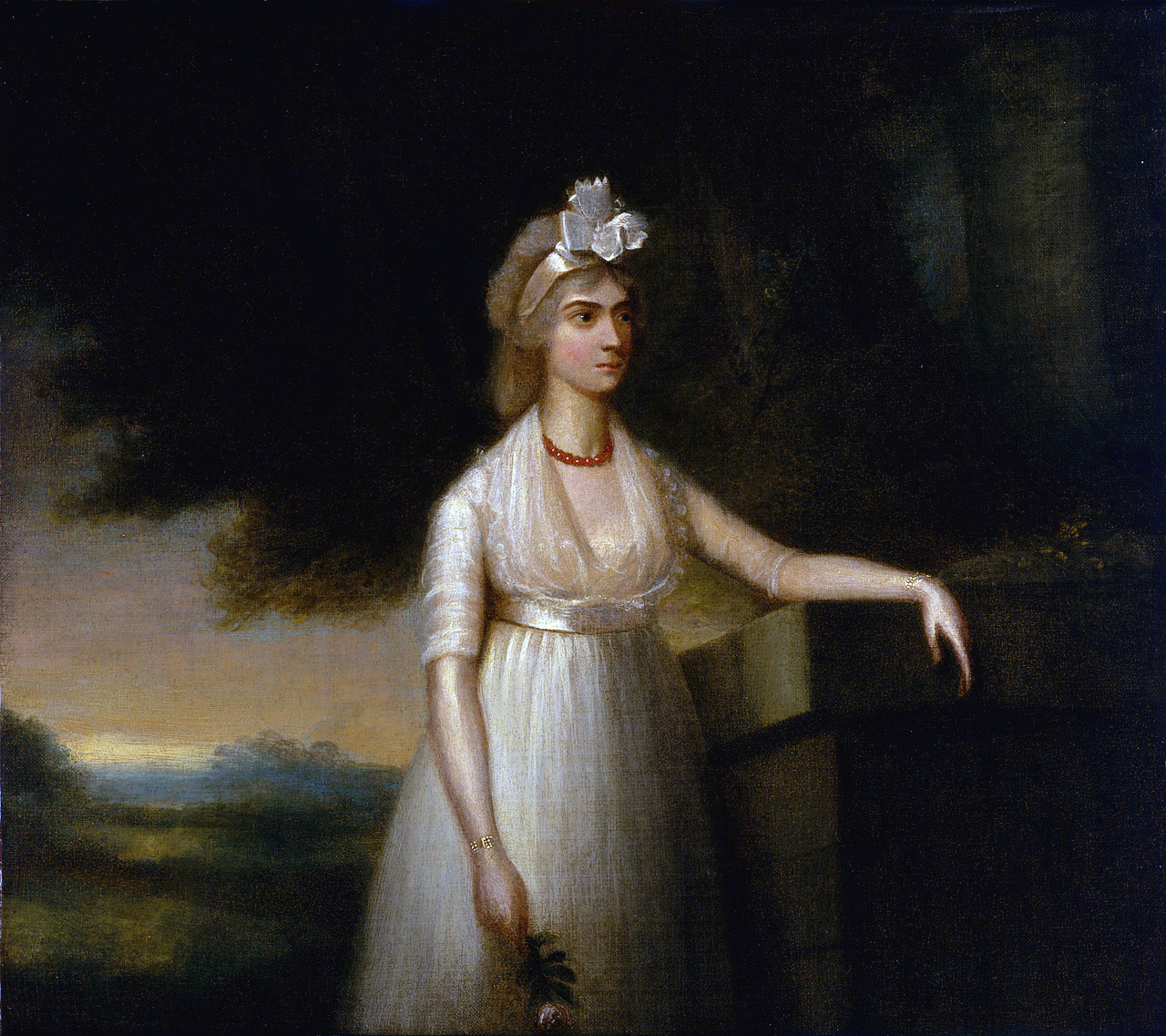
Nelson's wife, Lady Nelson, formerly Frances "Fanny" Nisbet of the island of Nevis, West Indies.

In 1784, Nelson received command of the frigate HMS Boreas, with the assignment to enforce the Navigation Acts in the vicinity of Antigua. Nelson hated Antigua and the only consolation was Mary Moutray, whom he greatly admired. The Acts were unpopular with both the Americans and the colonies. Nelson served on the station under Admiral Sir Richard Hughes, and often came into conflict with his superior officer over their differing interpretation of the Acts. The captains of the American vessels Nelson had seized sued him for illegal seizure. Because the merchants of the nearby island of Nevis supported the American claim, Nelson was in peril of imprisonment; he remained sequestered on Boreas for eight months until the courts ruled in his favour.

Meanwhile, Nelson met Frances "Fanny" Nisbet, a young widow from a Nevis plantation family. Nelson developed an affection for her. In response, her uncle John Herbert offered him a massive dowry. Both Herbert and Nisbet concealed the fact that their famed riches were a fiction, and Fanny did not disclose she was infertile due to a womb infection. Once they were engaged, Herbert offered Nelson nowhere near the dowry he had promised. During the Georgian era, breaking a marital engagement was seen as quite dishonourable, and so Nelson and Nisbet were married at Montpelier Estate in Nevis on 11 March 1787, shortly before the end of his tour of duty in the Caribbean. The marriage was registered at Fig Tree Church in St John's Parish on Nevis. Nelson returned to England in July, with Fanny following later.

Nelson remained with Boreas until she was paid off in November 1787. He and Fanny then divided their time between Bath and London, occasionally visiting Nelson's relations in Norfolk. In 1788, they settled at Nelson's childhood home in Burnham Thorpe. Now in reserve and on half-pay, he attempted to persuade the Admiralty—and other senior figures he was acquainted with, such as Hood—to provide him with a command. He was unsuccessful, as there were too few ships in the peacetime navy, and Hood did not intercede on his behalf. Nelson spent his time trying to find employment for former crew members, attending to family affairs, and cajoling contacts in the navy for a posting. In 1792, the French revolutionary government annexed the Austrian Netherlands (now Belgium). The Admiralty recalled Nelson to service and gave him command of the 64-gun HMS Agamemnon in January 1793. Nelson took his stepson Josiah with him as a midshipman. On 1 February, France declared war.

=== Mediterranean service ===
In May 1793, Nelson sailed as part of a division commanded by Vice Admiral William Hotham, joined later that month by the rest of Lord Hood's fleet. The force initially sailed to Gibraltar and—with the intention of establishing naval superiority in the Mediterranean—made their way to Toulon, anchoring off the port in July. Toulon was largely controlled by moderate republicans and royalists, but threatened by the forces of the National Convention marching on the city. Short of supplies and doubting their ability to defend themselves, the city authorities requested Hood take it under his protection. Hood readily acquiesced, and sent Nelson to carry dispatches to Sardinia and Naples, requesting reinforcements. After delivering the dispatches to Sardinia, Agamemnon arrived at Naples in early September. There, Nelson met King Ferdinand IV of Naples, followed by the British ambassador to the kingdom, William Hamilton. During the negotiations for reinforcements, Nelson was introduced to Hamilton's new wife Emma Hamilton.

The negotiations were successful, and 2,000 sailors and several ships were mustered by mid-September. Nelson put to sea in pursuit of a French frigate, but on failing to catch her, sailed for Leghorn and then Corsica. He arrived at Toulon on 5 October, where he found a large French army had occupied the hills surrounding the city and was bombarding it. Hood still hoped the city could be held if more reinforcements arrived, and sent Nelson to join a squadron operating off Cagliari.

=== Corsica ===
Early on 22 October 1793, Agamemnon sighted five sails. Nelson closed with them and discovered they were a French squadron. He promptly gave chase, firing on the 40-gun Melpomene. During the action of 22 October 1793, he inflicted considerable damage, but the remaining French ships turned to join the battle. Realising he was outnumbered, Nelson withdrew and continued to Cagliari, arriving on 24 October. After making repairs, Nelson and Agamemnon sailed for Tunis on 26 October with a squadron under Commodore Robert Linzee. On arrival, Nelson was given command of a small squadron consisting of Agamemnon, three frigates and a sloop, and ordered to blockade the French garrison on Corsica. The fall of Toulon at the end of December 1793 severely damaged British fortunes in the Mediterranean. Hood had failed to make adequate provisions for a withdrawal and 18 French ships-of-the-line fell into republican hands. Nelson's mission to Corsica took on added significance, as it could provide the British a naval base close to the French coast. Hood therefore reinforced Nelson with extra ships in January 1794.

A British assault force landed on the island on 7 February, after which Nelson moved to intensify the blockade off Bastia. For the rest of the month, he carried out raids along the coast and intercepted enemy shipping. By late February, San Fiorenzo had fallen, and British troops under Lieutenant-General David Dundas had entered the outskirts of Bastia. However, Dundas merely assessed the enemy positions and then withdrew, arguing the French were too well entrenched to risk an assault. Nelson convinced Hood otherwise, but a protracted debate between the army and naval commanders meant Nelson did not receive permission to proceed until late March. Nelson began to land guns from his ships and emplace them in the hills surrounding the town. On 11 April, the British squadron entered the harbour and opened fire while Nelson took command of the land forces and commenced bombardment. After 45 days the town surrendered. Nelson then prepared for an assault on Calvi, working in company with Lieutenant-General Charles Stuart.

British forces landed at Calvi on 19 June, and immediately began moving guns ashore to occupy the heights surrounding the town. While Nelson directed a continuous bombardment of the enemy positions, Stuart's soldiers began to advance. On the morning of 12 July, Nelson was at one of the forward batteries when a shot struck one of the nearby sandbags protecting the position, spraying stones and sand. Nelson was struck by debris in his right eye and forced to retire from the position. However, his wound was soon bandaged and he returned to action. By 18 July, most enemy positions had been disabled, and Stuart, supported by Nelson, stormed the main defensive position at night and captured it. Repositioning their guns, the British brought Calvi under constant bombardment, and the town surrendered on 10 August. Nelson did regain partial sight in his damaged eye, but said he could only "...distinguish light from dark but no object."

=== Genoa and the fight of the Ça Ira ===
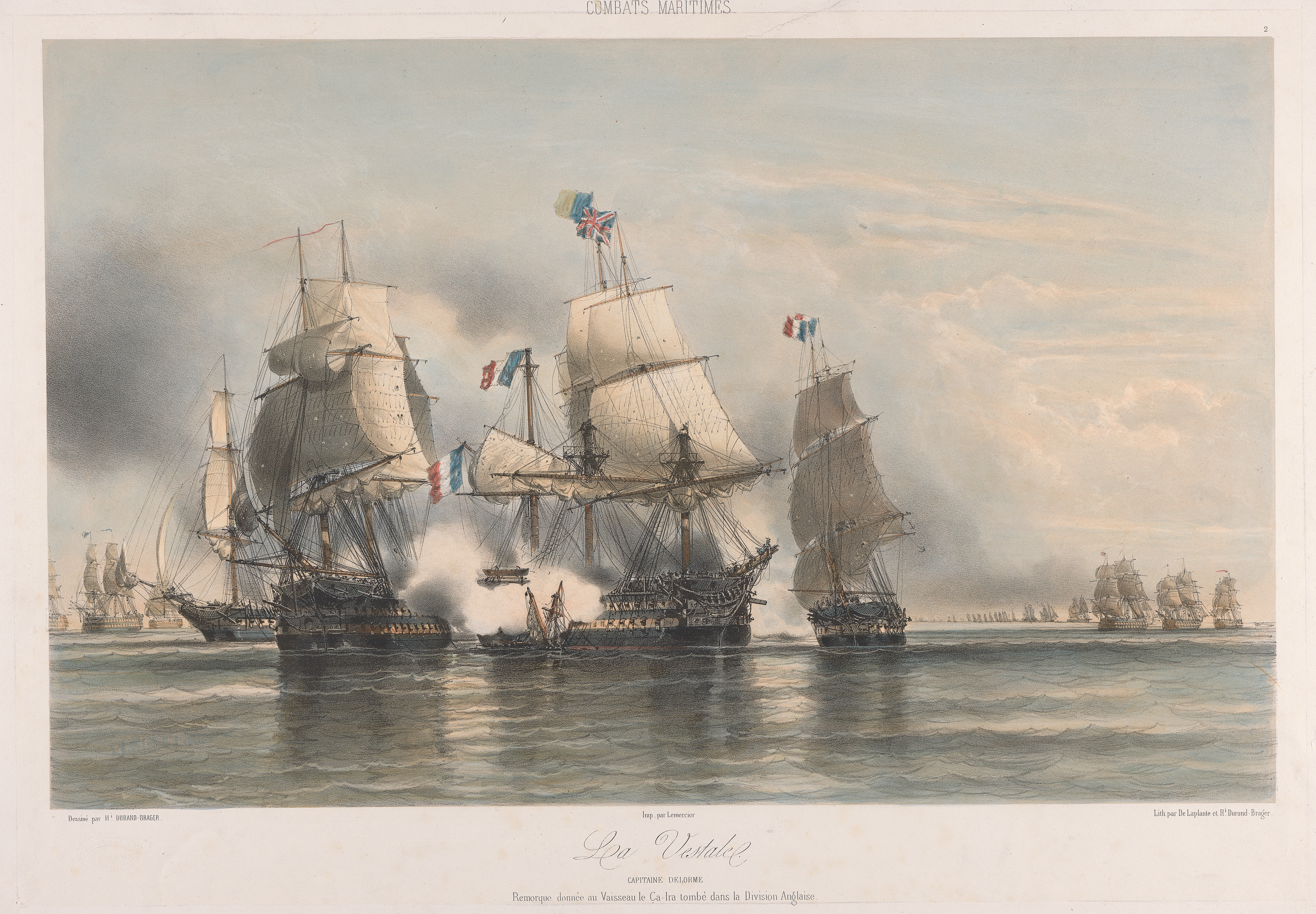
The fight of the Ça Ira

After the occupation of Corsica, Hood ordered Nelson to open diplomatic relations with the city-state of Genoa, a strategically important potential ally. Soon after, Hood returned to England and was succeeded by Admiral William Hotham as commander-in-chief in the Mediterranean. Nelson put into Leghorn and, while Agamemnon underwent repairs, met with other naval officers at the port and entertained a brief affair with local Adelaide Correglia. Hotham arrived with the rest of the fleet in December, whereupon Nelson and Agamemnon sailed on a number of cruises with them in late 1794 and early 1795. On 8 March, news reached Hotham of the French fleet at sea heading for Corsica. He immediately set out to intercept them, and Nelson eagerly anticipated his first fleet action. The French were reluctant to engage, and the two fleets shadowed each other on 12 March. The following day, two of the French ships collided, allowing Nelson to engage the much larger 84-gun Ça Ira. This engagement went on for two and a half hours, until the arrival of two French ships forced Nelson to veer away, having inflicted heavy casualties and considerable damage.

The fleets continued to shadow each other, before making contact again on 14 March at the Battle of Genoa. Nelson joined the other British ships in attacking the battered Ça Ira, now under tow from Censeur. Heavily damaged, the two French ships were forced to surrender, and Nelson took possession of Censeur. Defeated at sea, the French abandoned their plan to invade Corsica and returned to port.

=== Skirmishes and the retreat from Italy ===
Nelson and the fleet remained in the Mediterranean throughout summer 1795. On 4 July, Agamemnon sailed from San Fiorenzo with a small force of frigates and sloops bound for Genoa. On 6 July, Nelson ran into the French fleet and found himself pursued by several, much larger ships-of-the-line. He retreated to San Fiorenzo, arriving just ahead of the pursuing French, who broke off as Nelson's signal guns alerted the British fleet in the harbour. Hotham pursued the French to the Hyères Islands, but failed to bring them to a decisive action. Several small engagements were fought, but to Nelson's dismay, he saw little action. Nelson returned to operate out of Genoa, intercepting and inspecting merchantmen and cutting-out suspicious vessels in enemy and neutral harbours. Nelson formulated ambitious plans for amphibious landings and naval assaults to frustrate the progress of the French Army of Italy now advancing on Genoa, but could excite little interest in Hotham. In November, Hotham was replaced by Sir Hyde Parker, but the situation in Italy was rapidly deteriorating for the British: the French were raiding around Genoa and strong Jacobin sentiment was rife within the city.

A large French assault at the end of November broke the allied lines, forcing a general retreat towards Genoa. Nelson's forces were able to cover the withdrawing army and prevent them from being surrounded, but he had too few ships and soldiers to materially alter the strategic situation. The British were forced to withdraw from the Italian ports. Nelson returned to Corsica on 30 November, angry and depressed with the British failure, and questioning his future in the navy.

=== Jervis and the evacuation of the Mediterranean ===
In January 1796, the new commander-in-chief of the fleet in the Mediterranean was Sir John Jervis, who appointed Nelson to exercise independent command over the ships blockading the French coast as a commodore. Nelson spent the first half of the year conducting operations to frustrate French advances and bolster Britain's Italian allies. Despite minor successes in intercepting small French warships—like at the action of 31 May 1796, when Nelson's squadron captured a convoy of seven small vessels—he began to feel British presence on the Italian peninsula was becoming useless. In June, Agamemnon was sent to Britain for repairs, and Nelson was appointed to the 74-gun HMS Captain.

The same month, the French thrust towards Leghorn and were certain to capture the city. Nelson hurried there to oversee the evacuation of British nationals and transport them to Corsica. After this, Jervis ordered him to blockade the newly captured French port. In July, he oversaw the occupation of Elba, but by September the Genoese had broken their neutrality to declare in favour of the French. By October, the Genoese position and continued French advances led the British to decide the Mediterranean fleet could no longer be supplied. They ordered it to be evacuated to Gibraltar. Nelson helped oversee the withdrawal from Corsica, and by December 1796 was aboard the frigate HMS Minerve, covering the evacuation of the garrison at Elba. He then sailed for Gibraltar.

During the passage, Nelson captured the Spanish frigate Santa Sabina, and placed Lieutenants Jonathan Culverhouse and Thomas Hardy in charge of the captured vessel; taking the frigate's Spanish captain on board Minerve. Santa Sabina was part of a larger Spanish force, and the next morning two Spanish ships-of-the-line and a frigate were sighted closing fast. Unable to outrun them, Nelson was initially determined to fight, but Culverhouse and Hardy raised the British colours and sailed northeast, drawing the Spanish ships after them until being captured, giving Nelson the opportunity to escape. Nelson went on to rendezvous with the British fleet at Elba, where he spent Christmas. He sailed for Gibraltar in late January, and after learning the Spanish fleet had sailed from Cartagena, stopped just long enough to collect Hardy, Culverhouse, and the rest of the prize crew captured with Santa Sabina, before pressing on through the straits to join Jervis off Cádiz.

=== Battle of Cape St. Vincent ===
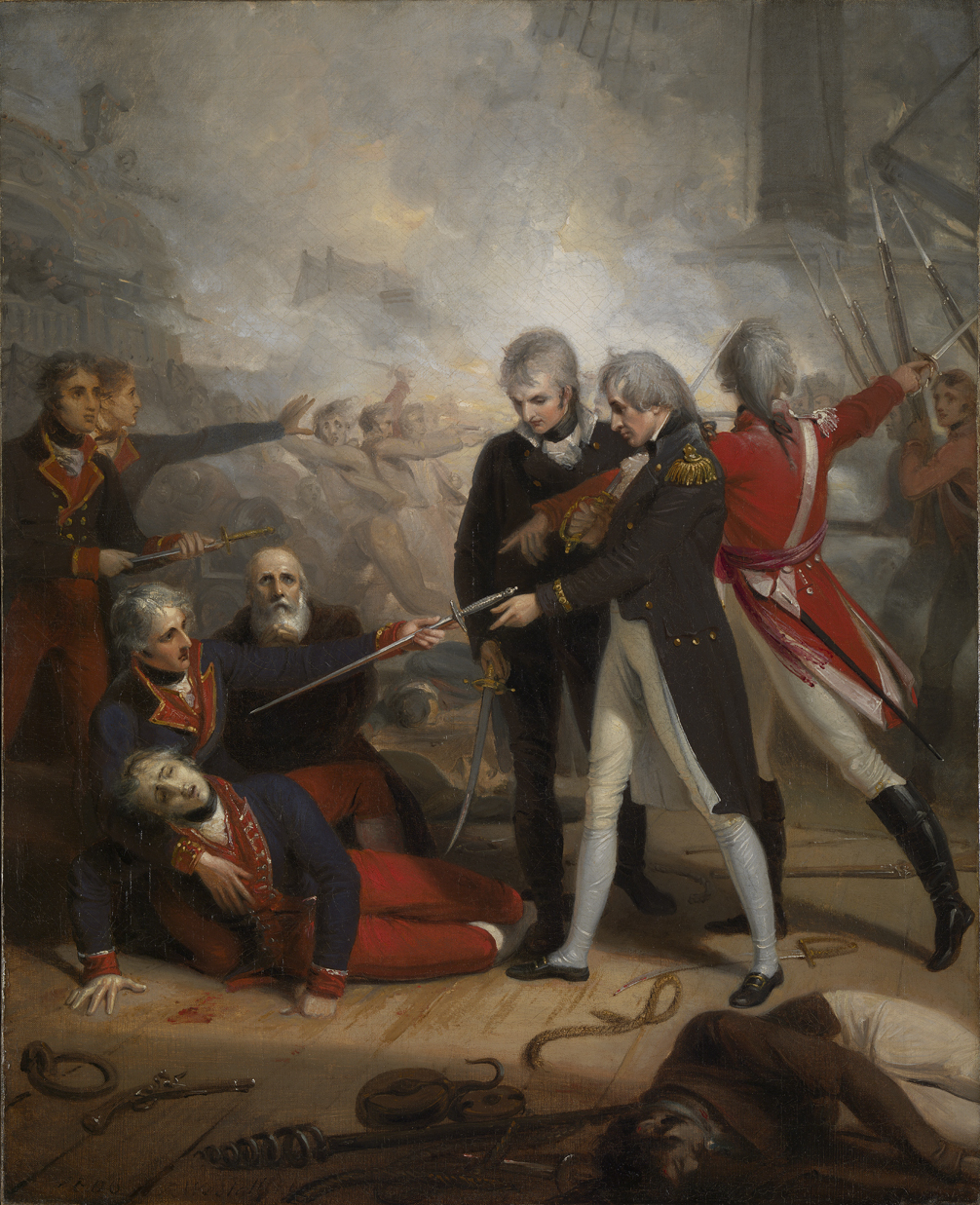
Nelson receives the surrender of the San Nicholas, an 1806 portrait by Richard Westall

Nelson joined Sir John Jervis' fleet off Cape St Vincent and reported the Spanish movements. Jervis decided to engage and the two fleets met on 14 February 1797. Nelson found himself towards the rear of the British line and realised it would be a long time before he could bring Captain into action. Nelson disobeyed orders and wore ship, breaking from the line and heading to engage the Spanish vanguard of the 112-gun San Josef, the 80-gun San Nicolas, and the 130-gun Santísima Trinidad. Captain engaged all three, assisted by HMS Culloden, which had come to Nelson's aid. After an hour of exchanging broadsides left Captain and Culloden badly damaged, Nelson found himself alongside San Nicolas. He led a boarding party across, crying "Westminster Abbey or glorious victory!" and forced her to surrender. San Josef attempted to come to San Nicolas' aid, but became entangled with her compatriot and was left immobile. Nelson led his party from the deck of San Nicolas onto San Josef and captured her as well. As night fell, the Spanish fleet broke off and sailed for Cádiz. Four ships had surrendered to the British and two of them were Nelson's. It was the first time in 300 years when a British flag officer led a boarding party.

Nelson was victorious, but had disobeyed direct orders. Jervis liked Nelson and so did not officially reprimand him, but did not mention Nelson's actions in his official report of the battle. He did write a private letter to First Lord of the Admiralty, George Spencer, where he said Nelson "contributed very much to the fortune of the day". Nelson also wrote several letters about his victory and reported his action was being referred to amongst the fleet as "Nelson's Patent Bridge for boarding first rates". Nelson's account was later challenged by Rear Admiral William Parker, who was aboard HMS Prince George. Parker claimed Nelson was supported by several more ships than he had acknowledged, and San Josef had already struck her colours by the time Nelson boarded her. Nelson's account of his role prevailed and the victory was well received in Britain; Jervis was made Earl St Vincent and on 17 May, Nelson was made a Knight of the Bath. On 20 February, in a standard promotion according to his seniority and unrelated to the battle, Nelson was promoted to Rear Admiral of the Blue.

== 1797–1801 ==
=== Action off Cádiz ===
Nelson was given HMS Theseus as his flagship and ordered to lie off Cádiz on 27 May 1797; monitoring the Spanish fleet and awaiting the arrival of Spanish treasure ships from the American colonies. He carried out a bombardment and personally led an amphibious assault on 3 July. During the action, Nelson's barge collided with the Spanish commander's barge, and hand-to-hand combat ensued between the two crews. Nelson was nearly cut down twice, and both times his life was saved by a sailor named John Sykes, who took the blows himself and was badly wounded. The British raiding force captured the Spanish boat and towed her back to Theseus. During this period, Nelson developed a scheme to capture Santa Cruz de Tenerife, aiming to seize a large quantity of specie from the treasure ship Principe de Asturias, which was reported to have recently arrived.

=== Battle of Santa Cruz de Tenerife ===
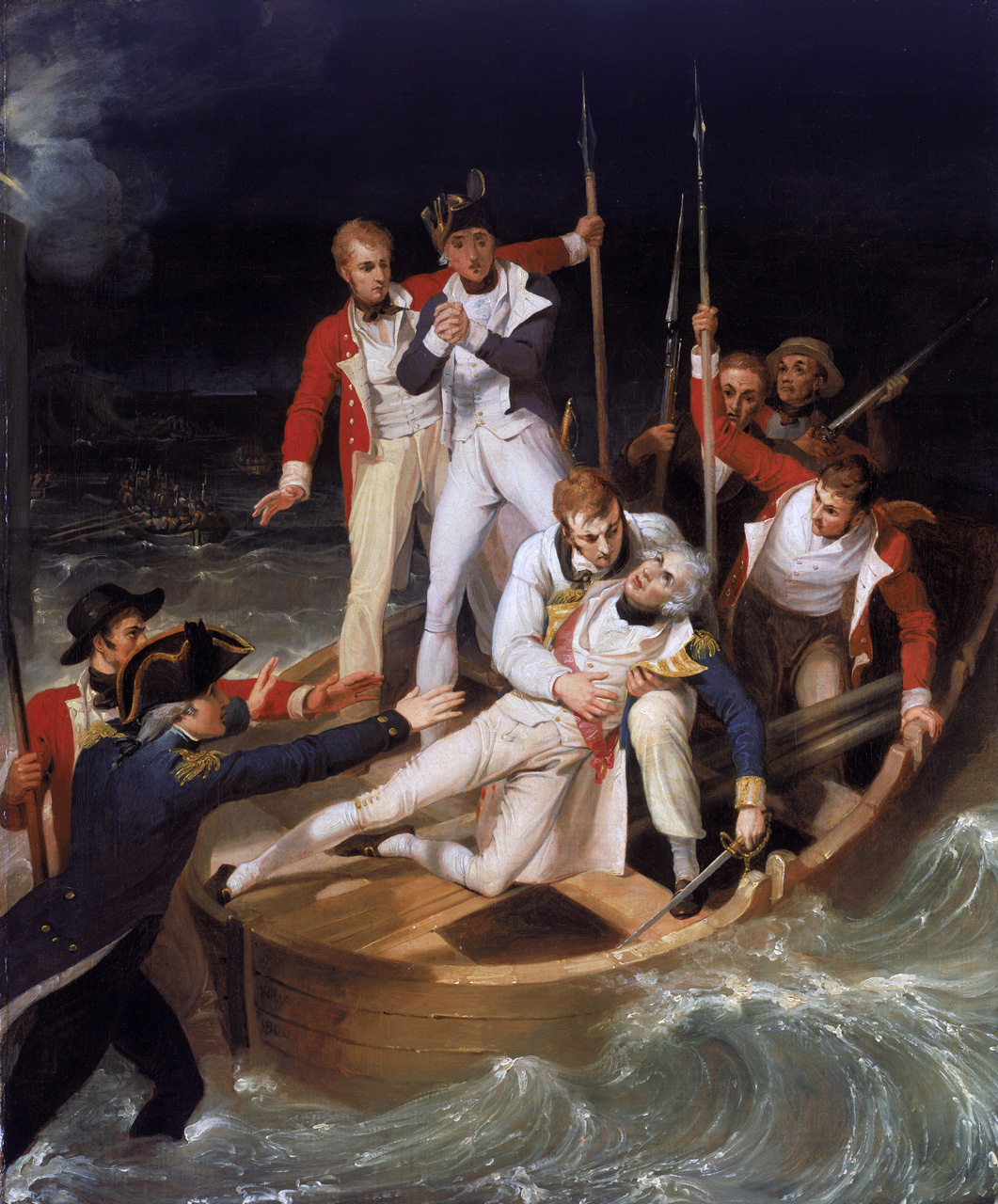
Nelson wounded during the Battle of Santa Cruz de Tenerife; 1806 painting by Richard Westall

The battle plan called for a combination of naval bombardments and an amphibious landing. The initial attempt was called off after adverse currents hampered the assault and the element of surprise was lost. Nelson immediately ordered another assault, but was beaten back. He prepared for a third attempt to take place during the night. Although he personally led one of the battalions, the operation ended in failure as the Spanish were better prepared than expected and had secured strong defensive positions. Several of the boats failed to land at the correct positions in the confusion, while those that did were swept by gunfire and grapeshot. Nelson's boat reached its intended landing point, but as he stepped ashore, he was hit in the right arm by a musketball which fractured his humerus in multiple places. He was rowed back to Theseus to be attended by its surgeon Thomas Eshelby. Upon arriving at his ship, he refused to be helped aboard, declaring:

"Let me alone! I have yet legs left and one arm. Tell the surgeon to make haste and get his instruments. I know I must lose my right arm and the sooner it is off, the better".

A tourniquet saved him from exsanguinating, and Eshelby amputated most of his right arm. Within half an hour, Nelson had returned to issuing orders to his captains. Years later, he would excuse himself to Commodore John Thomas Duckworth for not writing longer letters as he was not naturally left-handed. Later on, he developed the sensation of phantom limb in the area of his amputation and declared he had "found the direct evidence of the existence of soul". Meanwhile, a force under Sir Thomas Troubridge had fought their way to the main square but could go no further. Unable to return to the fleet because their boats had sunk, Troubridge was forced to enter into negotiations with the Spanish commander, and the British were allowed to withdraw. The expedition failed to achieve any of its objectives and left a quarter of the landing force dead or wounded. The squadron remained off Tenerife for a further three days, and by 16 August had rejoined Lord John Jervis' fleet off Cádiz. Despondent, Nelson wrote to Jervis:

"A left-handed Admiral will never again be considered as useful, therefore the sooner I get to a very humble cottage the better, and make room for a better man to serve the state".

Post operative pain led to Nelson's return to England accompanied by Thomas Eshelby. He returned to England aboard HMS Seahorse, arriving at Spithead on 1 September. He was met with a hero's welcome; the British public had lionised Nelson after Cape St Vincent, and his wound earned him sympathy. They refused to attribute the defeat at Tenerife to him, preferring instead to blame poor planning on the part of St Vincent, the Secretary at War, William Windham, or even Prime Minister William Pitt.

=== Return to England ===
Nelson returned to Bath with Fanny, before moving to London in October 1797 to seek expert medical attention for his amputation wound. While in London, news reached him of Admiral Duncan having defeated the Dutch fleet at the Battle of Camperdown. Nelson exclaimed he would have given his other arm to be present there. He spent the last months of 1797 recuperating in London, during which time he was awarded the Freedom of the City of London and a pension of £1,000 (equivalent to £108,600 in 2025) a year. He used this money to buy Round Wood Farm near Ipswich, and intended to retire there with Fanny. Despite his plans, Nelson was never to live there.

Although surgeons were unable to remove the central ligature from his amputation site which had caused considerable inflammation and infection, it came out of its own accord in early December, and Nelson rapidly began to recover. Eager to return to sea, he began agitating for a command and was promised the 80-gun HMS Foudroyant. As she was not yet ready for sea, Nelson was instead given command of the 74-gun HMS Vanguard, and he appointed Edward Berry as his flag captain. French activities in the Mediterranean theatre were raising concern in the Admiralty, as Napoleon was gathering forces in Southern France but the destination of his army was unknown. Nelson and Vanguard were to be dispatched to Cádiz to reinforce the fleet. On 28 March 1798, Nelson hoisted his flag and sailed to join Earl St Vincent. St Vincent sent him on to Toulon with a small force to reconnoitre French activities.

=== Hunting the French ===
Nelson passed through the Strait of Gibraltar and took up position off Toulon by 17 May, but his squadron was dispersed and blown southwards by a strong gale which struck the area on 20 May. While the British were battling the storm, Napoleon sailed with his invasion fleet commanded by Vice Admiral François-Paul Brueys d'Aigalliers. Nelson, reinforced with a number of ships from St Vincent, went in pursuit. Nelson began searching the Italian coast for Napoleon's fleet, but was hampered by a lack of frigates which could operate as fast scouts. Napoleon had already arrived at Malta and secured the island's surrender after a show of force. Nelson followed him there, but the French had already left by the time he arrived. After a conference with his captains, he decided Napoleon's most likely destination now was Egypt and headed for Alexandria. However, upon Nelson's arrival on 28 June, he found no sign of the French. Dismayed, he withdrew and began searching to the east of the port. During this time, Napoleon's fleet arrived in Alexandria on 1 July and landed their forces unopposed. Brueys anchored his fleet in Aboukir Bay, ready to support Napoleon if required.

Meanwhile, Nelson had crossed the Mediterranean again in a fruitless attempt to locate the French, and returned to Naples to re-provision. When he again set sail, his intentions were to search the seas off Cyprus, but he decided to pass Alexandria again for a final check. Along the way, his force found and captured a French merchant ship, which provided the first news of the French fleet: they had passed south-east of Crete a month prior—heading to Alexandria. Nelson hurried to the port, but again found it empty of the French. Searching along the coast, he finally discovered the French fleet in Aboukir Bay on 1 August 1798.

=== Battle of the Nile ===
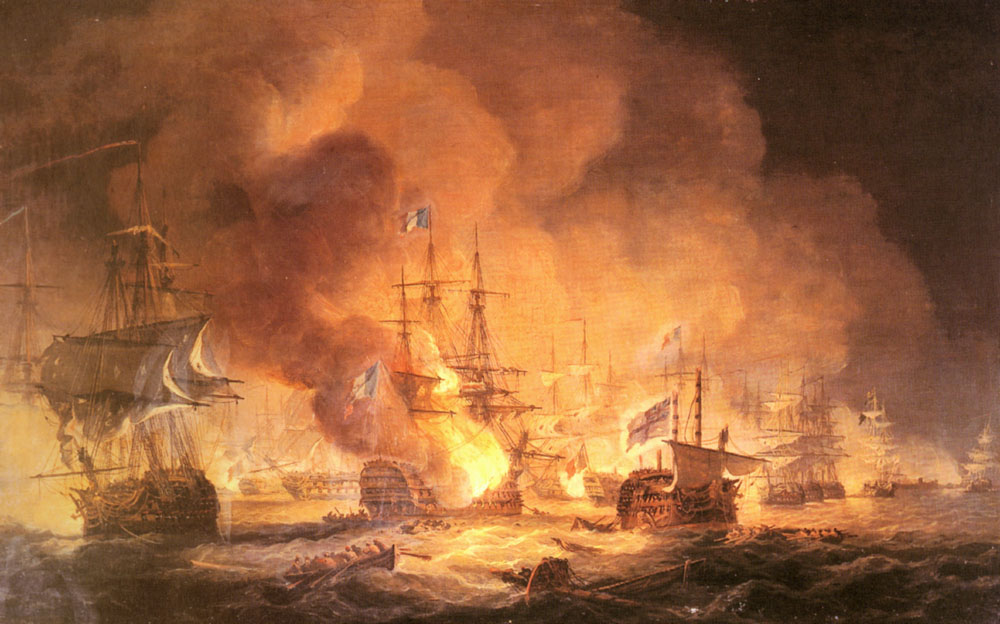
Battle of the Nile, 1 August 1798 at 10 pm, painting by Thomas Luny

Nelson immediately prepared for battle, repeating a sentiment he had expressed at Cape St. Vincent: "Before this time tomorrow, I shall have gained a peerage or Westminster Abbey." It was late by the time the British arrived, and the French, anchored in a strong position and possessing a combined firepower greater than Nelson's fleet, did not expect them to attack. However, Nelson immediately ordered his ships to advance. The French line was anchored close to a line of shoals, believing this would secure their port side from attack; Brueys had assumed the British would follow convention and attack his centre from the starboard side. However, Captain Thomas Foley aboard HMS Goliath discovered a gap between the shoals and the French ships, and took Goliath into this channel. The unprepared French found themselves attacked on both sides; the British fleet split, with some following Foley and others passing down the starboard side of the French line.

The British fleet was soon heavily engaged, passing down the French line and engaging their ships one by one. Nelson, on Vanguard, personally engaged Spartiate, while also coming under fire from Aquilon. At about eight o'clock, he was with Edward Berry on the quarterdeck when a piece of French shot struck him in the forehead. He fell to the deck, with a flap of torn skin obscuring his good eye. Blinded and half-stunned, he felt sure he would die and cried out, "I am killed. Remember me to my wife." He was taken below to be seen by the surgeon. After examining Nelson, the surgeon pronounced the wound non-threatening and applied a temporary bandage. The French van, pounded by British fire from both sides, had begun to surrender, and the victorious British ships continued to move down the line, bringing Brueys' 118-gun flagship Orient under constant, heavy fire. Orient caught fire under this bombardment and later exploded. Nelson briefly came on deck to direct the battle, but returned to the surgeon after watching the destruction of Orient.

The Battle of the Nile was a major blow to Napoleon's ambitions in the east. His fleet was destroyed; Orient, another ship and two frigates were burnt, while seven 74-gun ships and two 80-gun ships were captured. Only two ships-of-the-line and two frigates escaped. The forces Napoleon had brought to Egypt were stranded. Napoleon attacked north along the Mediterranean coast, but Turkish defenders supported by Captain Sir Sidney Smith defeated his army at the Siege of Acre. Napoleon then left his army and sailed back to France, evading detection by British ships. Given its strategic importance, historians such as Ernle Bradford regard Nelson's achievement at the Nile as the most significant of his career, even greater than Trafalgar seven years later.

==== Rewards ====
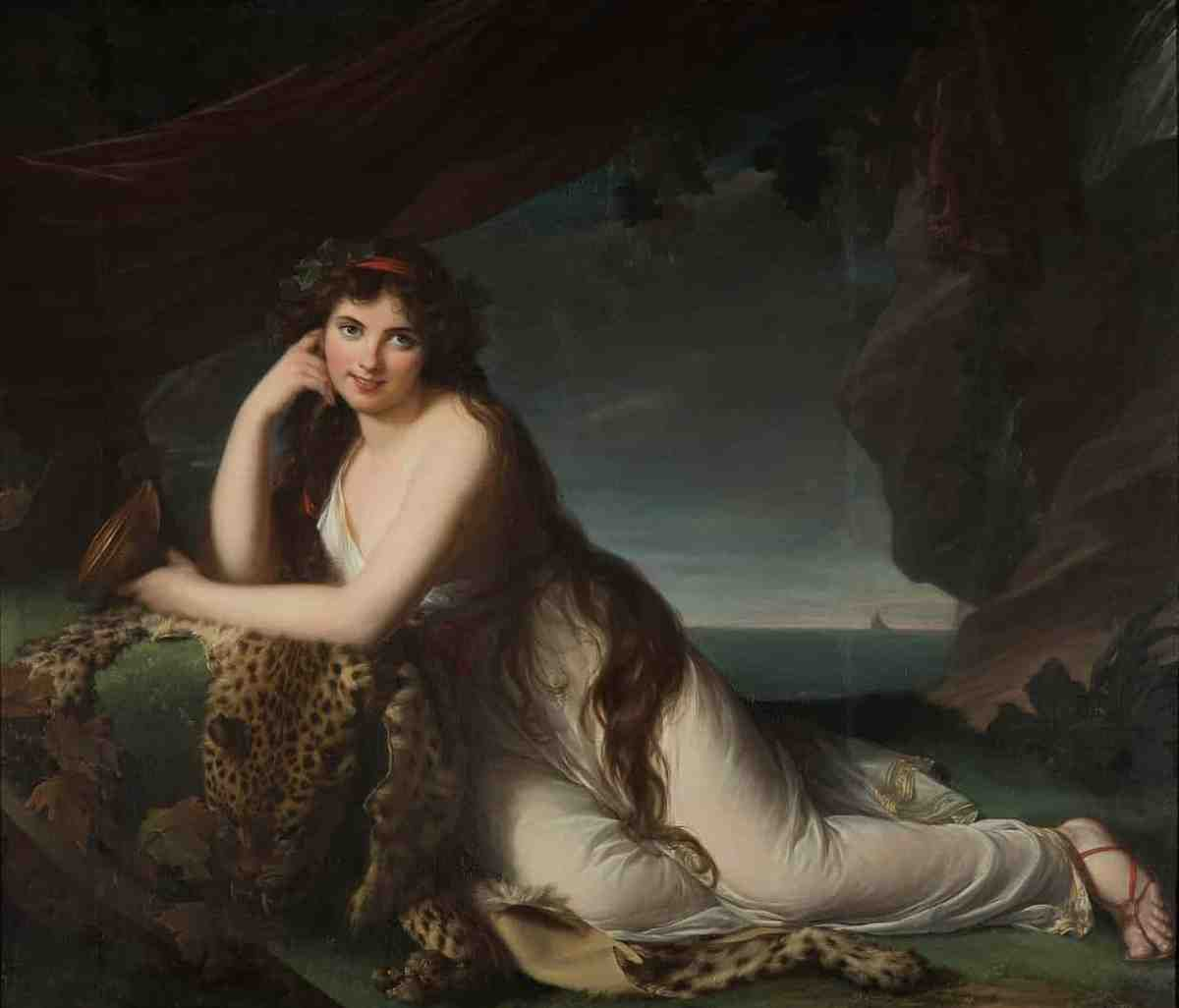
Lady Hamilton as either a bacchante or Ariadne by Élisabeth Louise Vigée Le Brun, c. 1790; a painting owned by Nelson which hung above his bed until his death

Nelson wrote dispatches to the Admiralty and oversaw temporary repairs to the Vanguard before sailing to Naples, where he was met with enthusiastic celebrations. King Ferdinand IV of Naples, accompanied by the Hamiltons, greeted him in person when he arrived at port, and Sir William Hamilton invited Nelson to stay at his home. Celebrations were held in honour of Nelson's birthday in September 1798, and he attended a banquet at the Hamiltons' house, where other officers had begun to notice his attentions to Emma, Lady Hamilton.

Lord Jervis himself had begun to grow concerned about reports of Nelson's behaviour, but in early October, word of Nelson's victory reached London and overshadowed the matter. The First Lord of the Admiralty, George Spencer, fainted upon hearing the news. Celebrations erupted across the country; balls and victory feasts were held and church bells were rung. The City of London awarded Nelson and his captains swords, while the King ordered they be presented with special medals. Emperor Paul I of Russia sent Nelson a gift, and Sultan Selim III of the Ottoman Empire awarded Nelson the Order of the Turkish Crescent, as well as the diamond chelengk from his own turban, for Nelson's role in restoring Ottoman rule to Egypt.

Samuel Hood, after a conversation with the prime minister, told Nelson's wife Fanny her husband would likely be given a viscountcy, similarly to Jervis' earldom after Cape St. Vincent, and Adam Duncan's viscountcy after Camperdown. However, Lord Spencer demurred, arguing such an award would create an unwelcome precedent as Nelson was only detached in command of a squadron, rather than being commander in chief of the fleet. Instead, Nelson received the title of Baron Nelson of the Nile.

=== Neapolitan campaign ===
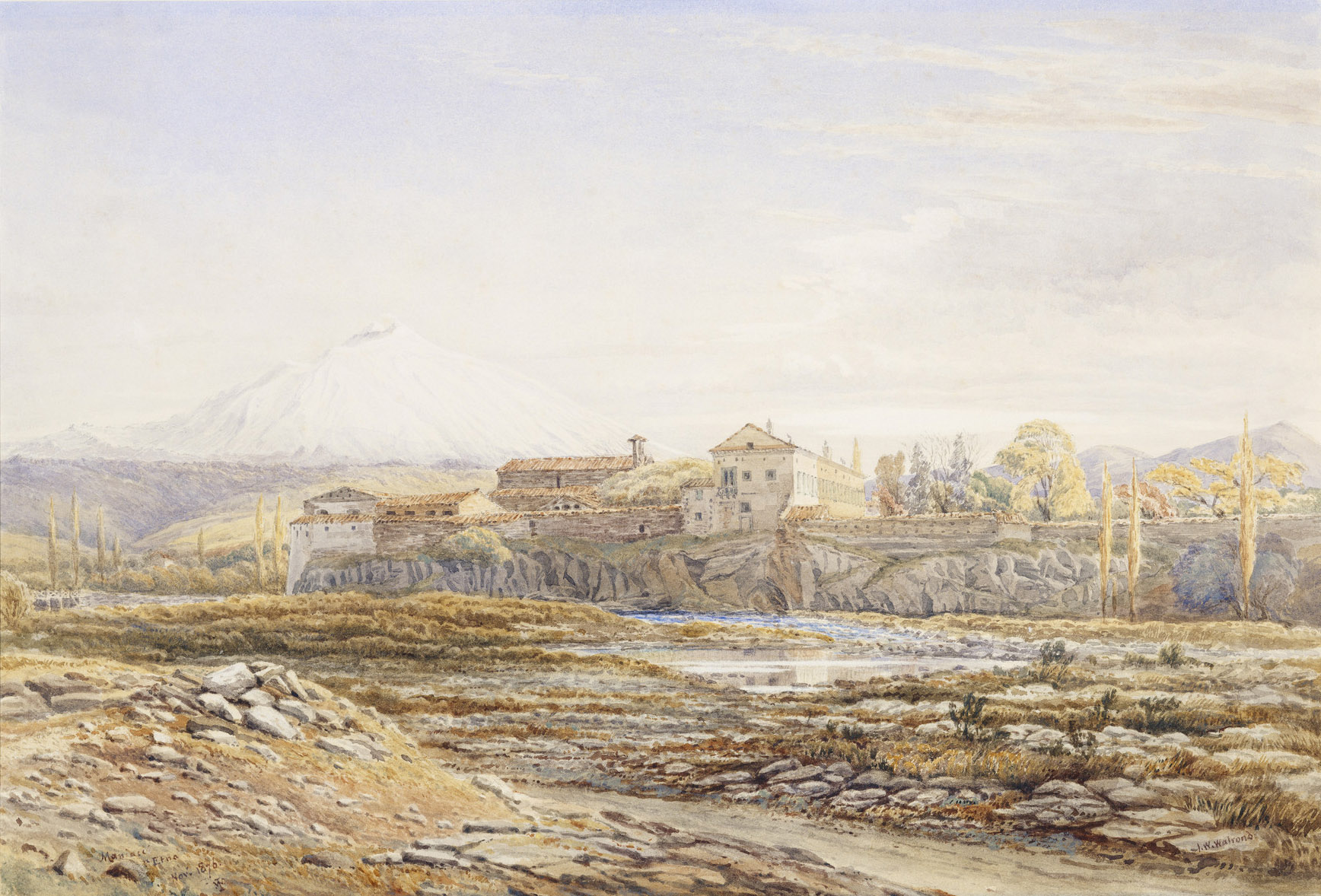
Castello di Maniace, caput of the Dukedom of Bronte, situated 5 miles north of the town of Bronte. Painted in 1876 by Sir John Walrond, 1st Baronet

Nelson was dismayed by the decision of George Spencer, 2nd Earl Spencer, and declared he would rather have received no title than a mere barony. However, he was cheered by the attention showered on him by the citizens of Naples, the prestige accorded to him by the kingdom's elite, and the comforts he received at the Hamilton residence. He frequently visited their residence to attend functions in his honour, or tour nearby attractions with Emma, who was almost constantly at his side and with whom he had fallen deeply in love. Orders arrived from the Admiralty to blockade the French forces in Alexandria and Malta, a task Nelson delegated to his captains Samuel Hood and Alexander Ball. Despite enjoying his lifestyle in Naples, even while judging it to be a "country of fiddlers and poets, whores and scoundrels", which he found less than desirable, Nelson began to think of returning to England. However, King Ferdinand IV had just faced an extended period of pressure from his wife Maria Carolina of Austria, who was advocating for an aggressive foreign policy towards France, a country which had beheaded her sister and its queen Marie Antoinette five years ago. Sir William Hamilton was joined in agreement with Queen Maria Carolina, and the King finally agreed to declare war on France.

The Neapolitan Army led by Austrian General Karl Mack von Leiberich and supported by Nelson's fleet retook Rome from the French in late November 1798. The French regrouped outside Rome and, after being reinforced, routed the Neapolitans. In disarray, the Neapolitan army fled to Naples, with the pursuing French close behind. Nelson hastily organised the evacuation of the Royal Family, several nobles, and British nationals, including the Hamiltons. The evacuation started on 23 December and sailed through heavy gales before reaching the safety of Palermo on 26 December. With the departure of the Royal Family, Naples descended into anarchy, and news reached Palermo in January of the French entering the city under General Championnet and proclaiming the Parthenopaean Republic. Nelson was promoted to Rear-Admiral of the Red on 14 February 1799, and was occupied for several months blockading Naples, while a popular counter-revolutionary force under Cardinal Ruffo known as the Sanfedisti marched to retake the city. In late June, Ruffo's army entered Naples, forcing the French and their supporters to withdraw to the city's fortifications, as rioting and looting broke out amongst the ill-disciplined Neapolitan troops.

Dismayed by the bloodshed, Ruffo agreed to a capitulation with the Jacobin forces which allowed them safe conduct to France. Nelson arrived off Naples on 24 June to find the treaty put into effect. His subsequent role is still controversial. Nelson, aboard Foudroyant, was outraged, and backed by King Ferdinand IV, he insisted the rebels must surrender unconditionally. They refused. Nelson appears to have relented and the Jacobin forces marched out to the awaiting transports. Nelson then had the transports seized. He took those who surrendered under the treaty under armed guard, as well as the former Admiral Francesco Caracciolo. Nelson ordered his trial by court-martial and refused Caracciolo's request for its conduct by British officers. Caracciolo was also not allowed to summon witnesses in his defence and was tried by royalist Neapolitan officers. He was sentenced to death. Caracciolo requested to be shot rather than hanged, but Nelson, following the wishes of Queen Maria Carolina, a close friend of Lady Hamilton, also denied this request, and even ignored the court's request to allow 24 hours for Caracciolo to prepare himself. Caracciolo was hanged aboard the Neapolitan frigate Minerva at 5 o'clock the same afternoon.

Nelson kept most of the Jacobins on the transports and began to hand hundreds over for trial and execution, refusing to intervene, despite pleas for clemency from both the Hamiltons and Queen Maria Carolina. When the transports were finally allowed to carry the Jacobins to France, less than one-third were still alive. On 13 August 1799, in reward for his support of the monarchy, King Ferdinand IV gave Nelson the newly created title of Duke of Bronte in the peerage of the Kingdom of Sicily as his perpetual property, as well as the estate of the former Benedictine abbey of Santa Maria di Maniace—which he later transformed into the Castello di Nelson—situated between the comunes of Bronte and Maniace, later known as the Duchy of Nelson. In 1799, Nelson opposed the mistreatment of slaves held in Portuguese galleys off Palermo and intervened to secure their release. Nelson petitioned the Portuguese commander Marquiz de Niza to hand over the slaves. The marquis acquiesced to the unusual request, allowing 24 slaves to be transferred to HMS Bonne Citoyenne, their blessings to Nelson ringing out across the harbour as their names were added to the sloop's already crowded muster book.

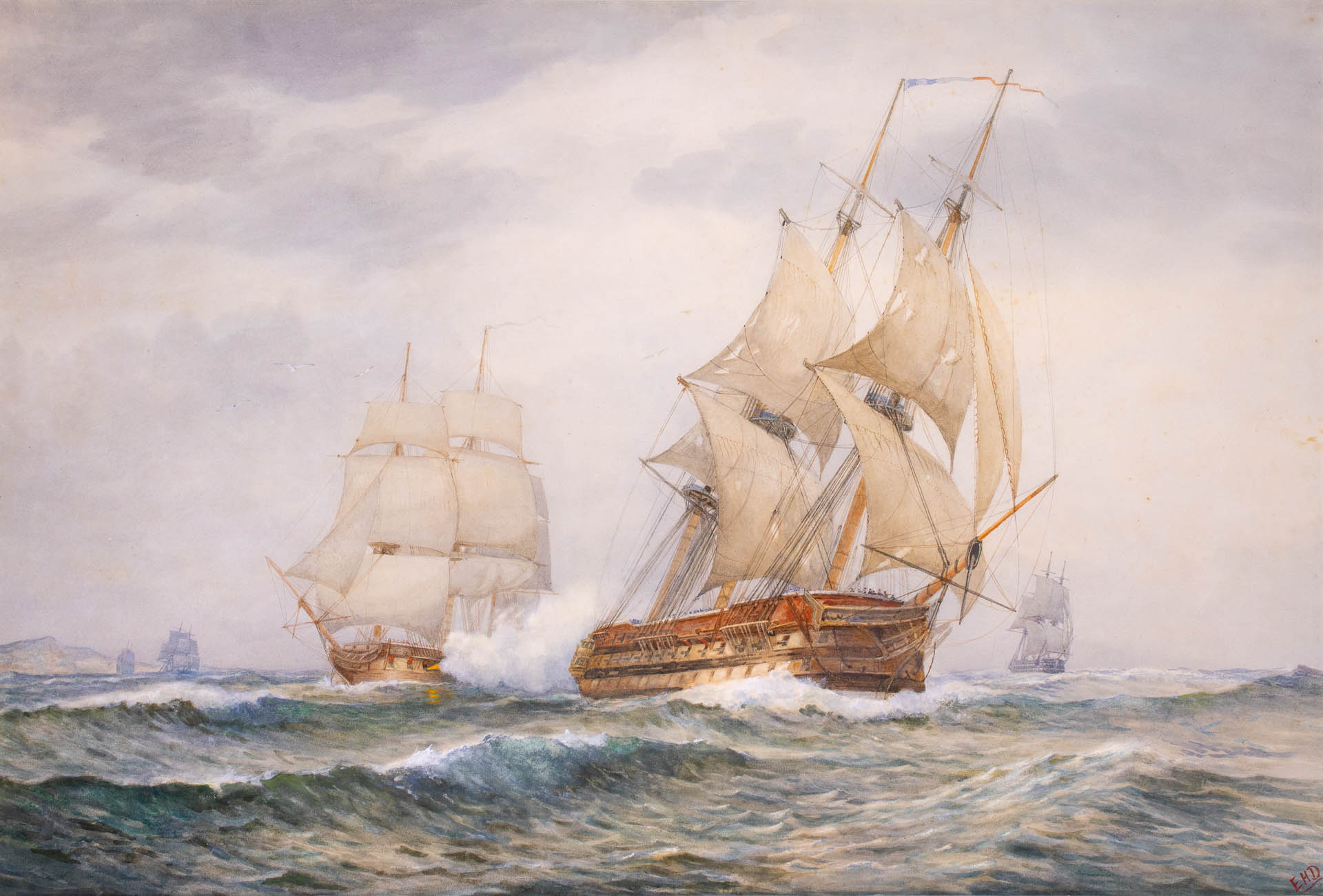
The Battle of the Malta convoy

=== Siege of Malta ===
Nelson returned to Palermo in August, and in September became the senior officer in the Mediterranean after Lord John Jervis' successor, George Elphinstone, 1st Viscount Keith, left to chase the French and Spanish fleets into the Atlantic. Nelson spent most of 1799 at the Neapolitan court, but put to sea again in February 1800 after Lord Keith's return. Keith ordered Nelson to assist in the siege of Malta, where the Royal Navy was conducting a tight blockade. On 18 February, Généreux—a survivor of the Battle of the Nile—was sighted and Nelson gave chase, capturing her after a short battle and winning Keith's approval. Nelson and the Hamiltons sailed aboard Foudroyant from Naples on a brief cruise around Malta in April 1800 and anchored at Marsa Sirocco. Here Nelson and Emma lived together openly, and were hosted by Thomas Troubridge and Thomas Graham. It was during this time when Nelson and Lady Emma Hamilton's illegitimate daughter Horatia Nelson was likely conceived.

Nelson had a difficult relationship with his superior officer; he was gaining a reputation for insubordination, having initially refused to send ships when Keith requested them, and on occasion returning to Palermo without orders, pleading poor health. Keith's reports and rumours of Nelson's close relationship with Emma Hamilton were now circulating around London, and Lord Spencer wrote a pointed letter suggesting he return home.

=== Return to England ===
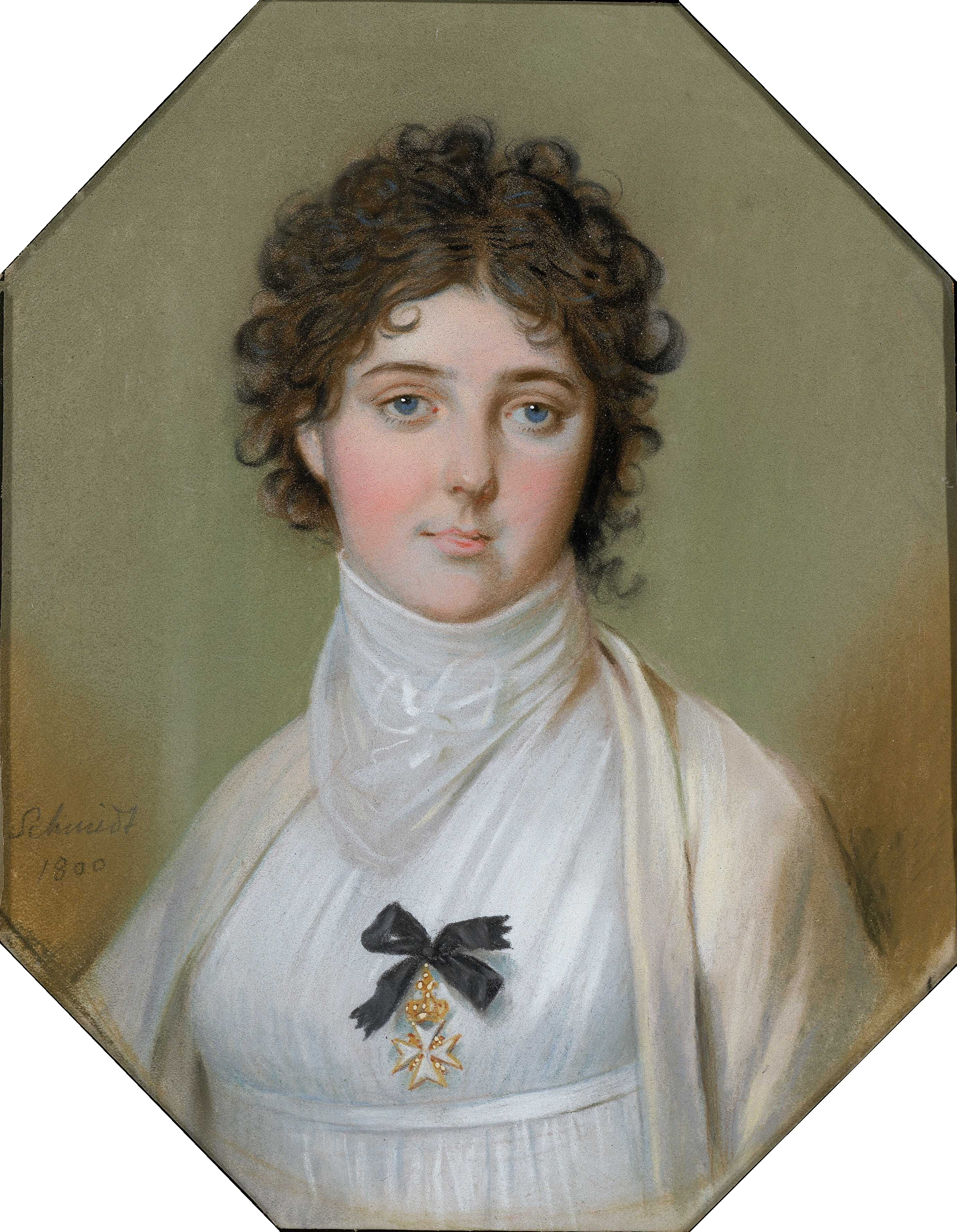
Emma Hamilton in an 1800 portrait owned by Nelson

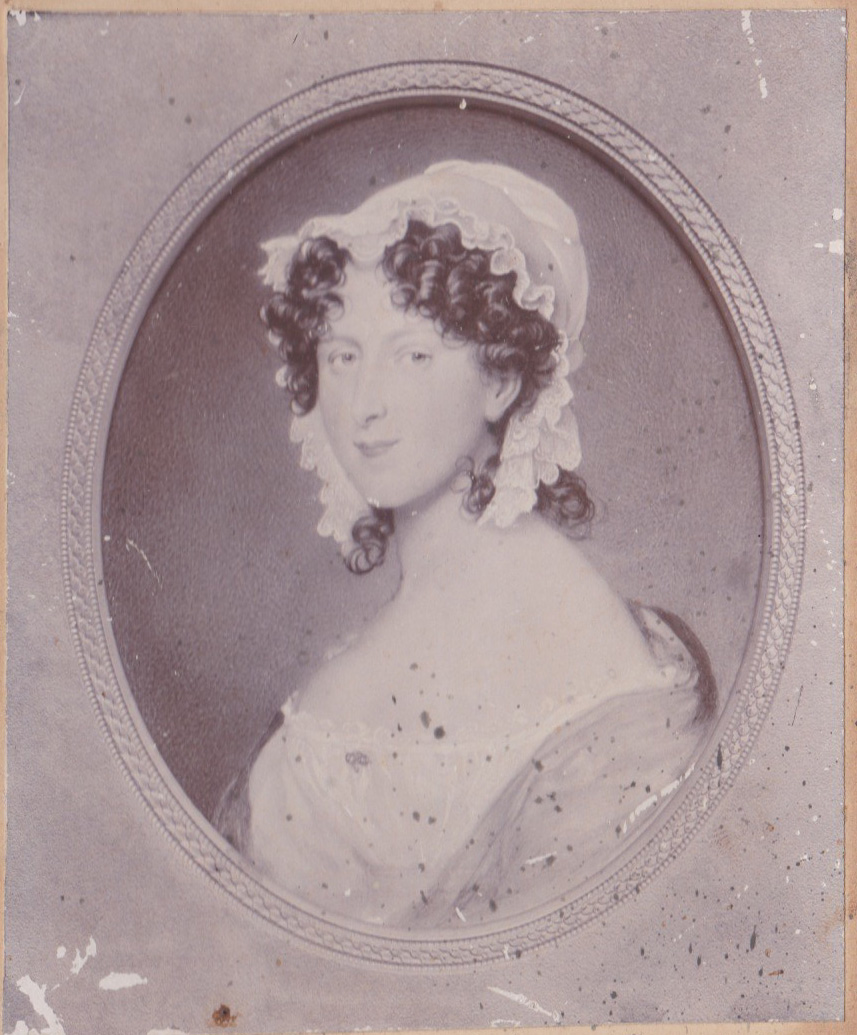
An antique photograph of a portrait of Horatia Ward (née Nelson)

The recall of Sir William Hamilton to Britain was a further incentive for Nelson to return. In June, Nelson left Malta and conveyed Queen Maria Carolina and her suite to Leghorn. Upon his arrival, Nelson shifted his flag to HMS Alexander, but again disobeyed Lord Keith's orders by refusing to join the main fleet. Keith travelled to Leghorn to demand an explanation in person, and refused to be moved by the Queen's pleas to allow her to be conveyed in a British ship. In the face of Keith's demands, Nelson reluctantly struck his flag and bowed to Lady Hamilton's request to return to England over land. Nelson, the Hamiltons, and several other British travellers left Leghorn for Florence on 13 July. They made stops at Trieste and Vienna, spending three weeks there, where they were entertained by the local nobility and heard the Missa in Angustiis by Haydn, which now bears Nelson's name. Haydn would meet them that August when they visited Eisenstadt. By September they were in Prague, and later called at Dresden, Dessau and Hamburg; from there they caught a packet ship to Great Yarmouth, arriving on 6 November. Nelson was given a hero's welcome, and after being sworn in as a freeman of the borough, received the crowd's applause. He then made his way to London, arriving on 9 November.

Nelson attended court and was guest of honour at many banquets and balls. During this period, Fanny Nelson and Lady Emma Hamilton met for the first time; Nelson was reported being cold and distant to his wife, while his attentions to Lady Hamilton and her obesity became the subject of gossip. With the marriage breaking down, Nelson began to hate even being in the same room as Fanny. Events came to a head around Christmas, when according to Nelson's solicitor, Fanny issued an ultimatum on whether he would choose her or Lady Hamilton. Nelson replied he loved Fanny but could not "forget his obligations" to Lady Hamilton. Nelson and Fanny never lived together again.

=== The Baltic ===
Shortly after his arrival in England, Nelson was appointed second-in-command of the Channel Fleet under Lord John Jervis. He was promoted to Vice-Admiral of the Blue on 1 January 1801, and travelled to Plymouth, where he was granted the freedom of the city on 22 January. On 29 January 1801, Lady Emma Hamilton gave birth to their daughter Horatia. Nelson was delighted, but subsequently disappointed when he was instructed to move his flag from HMS San Josef to HMS St George, in preparation for a planned expedition to the Baltic. Tired of British ships imposing a blockade against French trade and stopping and searching their merchantmen, the Russian, Prussian, Danish and Swedish governments had formed an alliance to break the blockade. Nelson joined Admiral Sir Hyde Parker's fleet at Yarmouth, from where they sailed for the Danish coast in March. On their arrival, Parker was inclined to blockade Denmark and control the entrance to the Baltic, but Nelson urged a pre-emptive attack on the Danish fleet in Copenhagen harbour. He convinced Parker to allow him to make an assault and was given significant reinforcements. Parker himself would wait in the Kattegat, covering Nelson's fleet in case of the arrival of the Swedish or Russian fleets.

=== Battle of Copenhagen ===
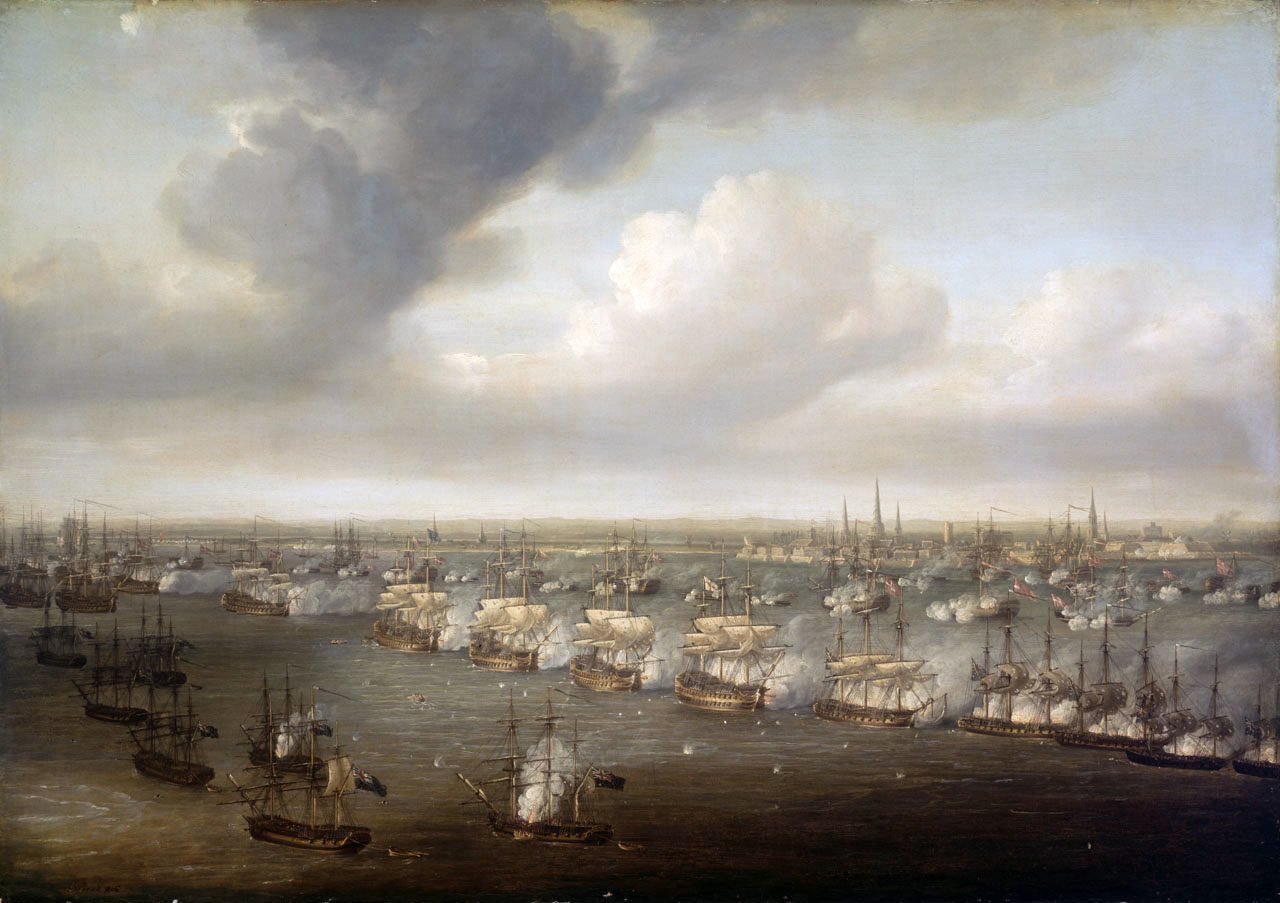
The Battle of Copenhagen, 2 April 1801, by Nicholas Pocock

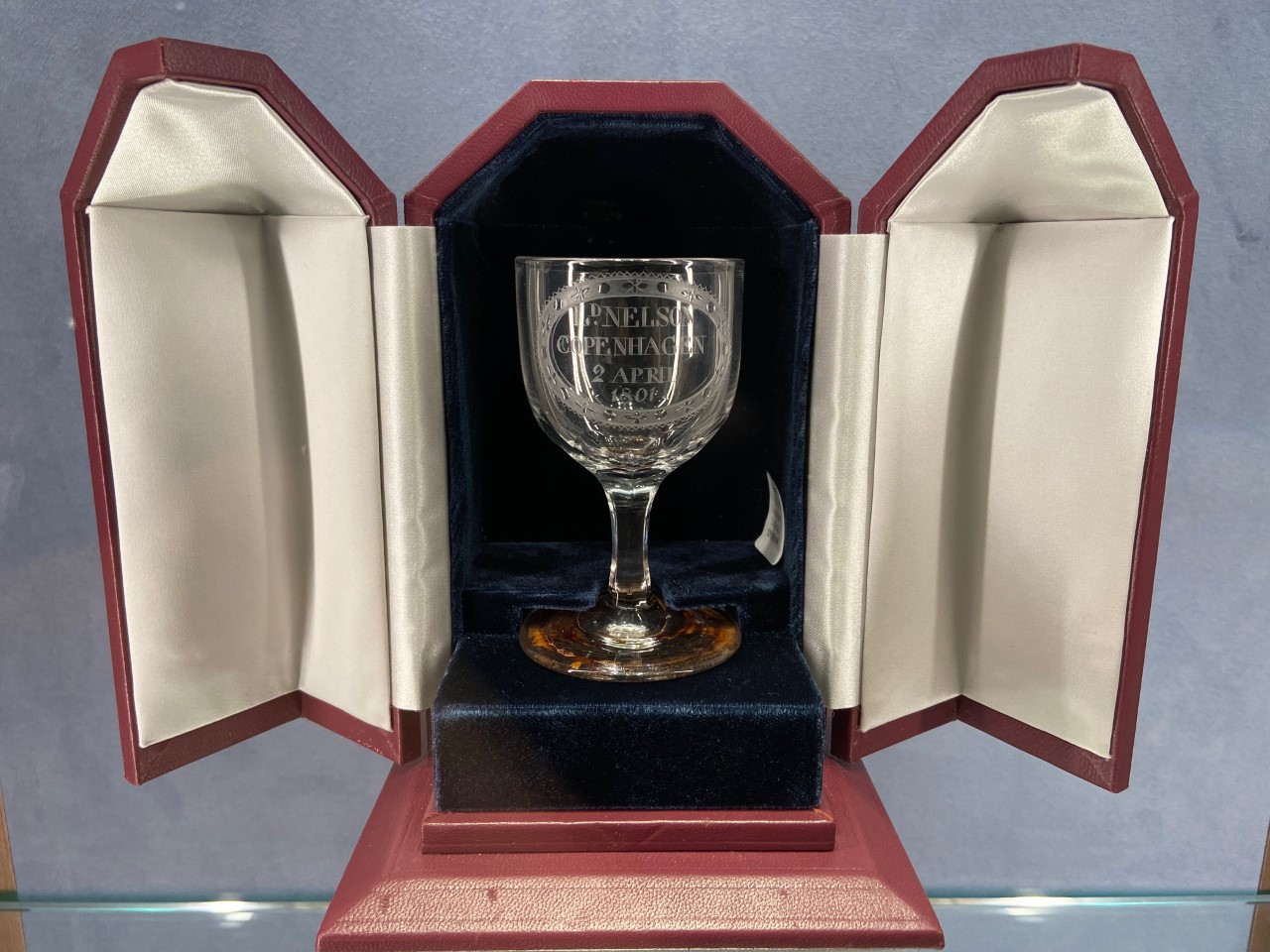
This glass was one of a set commissioned by Nelson to commemorate his victory at the Battle of Copenhagen.

On the morning of 2 April 1801, Nelson began to advance into Copenhagen harbour. The battle began badly for the British, with HMS Agamemnon, Bellona and Russell running aground, and the rest of the fleet encountering heavier fire from the Danish shore batteries than anticipated. Sir Hyde Parker sent the signal for Nelson to withdraw. Nelson, directing action aboard HMS Elephant, was informed of the signal by the signal lieutenant Frederick Langford, but angrily responded: "I told you to look out on the Danish commodore and let me know when he surrendered. Keep your eyes fixed on him." He then turned to his flag captain Thomas Foley, and said "You know, Foley, I have only one eye. I have a right to be blind sometimes." He raised the telescope to his blind eye, and said "I really do not see the signal." (Note: Nelson biographer Roger Knight disputes the veracity of this story, calling it a "myth".)

The battle lasted three hours, leaving both the Danish and British fleets heavily damaged. Nelson sent a letter to the Danish commander Crown Prince Frederick calling for a truce, which the Prince accepted. Parker approved of Nelson's actions in retrospect, and Nelson was given the honour of going into Copenhagen the next day to open formal negotiations. At a banquet that evening, he told Prince Frederick the battle was the most severe he had ever participated in. The outcome of the battle and several weeks of ensuing negotiations was a 14 week armistice, with Nelson becoming commander-in-chief in the Baltic Sea upon Parker's recall in May. As a reward for the victory, he was created Viscount Nelson of the Nile and of Burnham Thorpe in the County of Norfolk on 19 May 1801. In addition, on 4 August 1801, he was created Baron Nelson of the Nile and of Hilborough in the County of Norfolk. Nelson sailed to the Russian naval base at Reval in May, and there learnt the pact of armed neutrality was to be disbanded. Satisfied with the outcome of the expedition, he returned to England, arriving on 1 July.

== Leave in England, 1801–1803 ==
In France, Napoleon was amassing forces to invade Great Britain. After a brief spell in London, where he again visited the Hamiltons, Nelson was placed in charge of defending the English Channel to prevent the invasion. He spent the summer of 1801 reconnoitring the French coast, but saw little action apart from a failed attack on Boulogne in August. On 1 October, the Peace of Amiens was signed between the British and the French, and Nelson—in poor health again—retired once more to Britain, where he stayed with Sir William and Lady Hamilton. On 30 October, Nelson spoke in support of the Addington government in the House of Lords, and afterwards made regular visits to attend sessions.

=== Grand tour ===
In the summer of 1802, Nelson and the Hamiltons embarked on a tour of England and Wales, visiting Oxford, Woodstock, Oxfordshire, Blenheim Palace, Gloucester, Forest of Dean, Ross-on-Wye, then Monmouth, Abergavenny, Brecon, Carmarthen, Milford Haven (New Inn), Tenby and Swansea. At Merthyr Tydfil, he visited Cyfarthfa Ironworks to see the place where the 104 guns were made for his flagship HMS Victory. The party then visited Nelson, Caerphilly, Monmouth (Beaufort Arms), Hereford, Ludlow, Worcester, Birmingham, Warwick, Althorp and returned to Merton Place on 5 September, passing through numerous other towns and villages along the way. Nelson often found himself received as a hero (except at Woodstock), and was the centre of celebrations and events held in his honour. In September, Lady Hamilton purchased Merton Place, a country estate in Merton, Surrey, on behalf of Nelson, where he lived with the Hamiltons until William's death on 6 April 1803. The following month, war broke out once again and Nelson prepared to return to sea.

=== Witness at the treason trial of Edward Despard ===
In January 1803, Nelson appeared as a character witness in the treason trial of his former comrade-in-arms, Colonel Edward Despard. Despard—a member both of the London Corresponding Society and the United Irishmen—was the alleged ringleader of a conspiracy to assassinate King George III and seize the Tower of London as part of the so-called Despard Plot. In court, Nelson recollected his service with Despard in the Caribbean during the American War. Under cross-examination, however, Nelson had to concede to having "lost sight of Despard for the last twenty years". Nelson directed a further plea for clemency to Prime Minister Henry Addington, who later told Nelson "he and his family had sat up after supper, weeping over the letter".

== Return to sea, 1803 ==
Nelson was appointed commander-in-chief of the Mediterranean Fleet and given the first-rate HMS Victory as his flagship. He joined her at Portsmouth, where he received orders to sail to Malta and take command of a squadron there before joining the blockade of Toulon. Nelson arrived off Toulon in July 1803 and spent the next year and a half enforcing the blockade. He was promoted to Vice-Admiral of the White while still at sea on 23 April 1804. In January 1805, the French fleet under the command of Admiral Pierre-Charles Villeneuve escaped Toulon and eluded the blockading British. Nelson set off in pursuit, but after searching the eastern Mediterranean learnt the French were blown back into Toulon. Villeneuve managed to break out a second time in April, and this time succeeded in passing through the Strait of Gibraltar and into the Atlantic—bound for the West Indies.

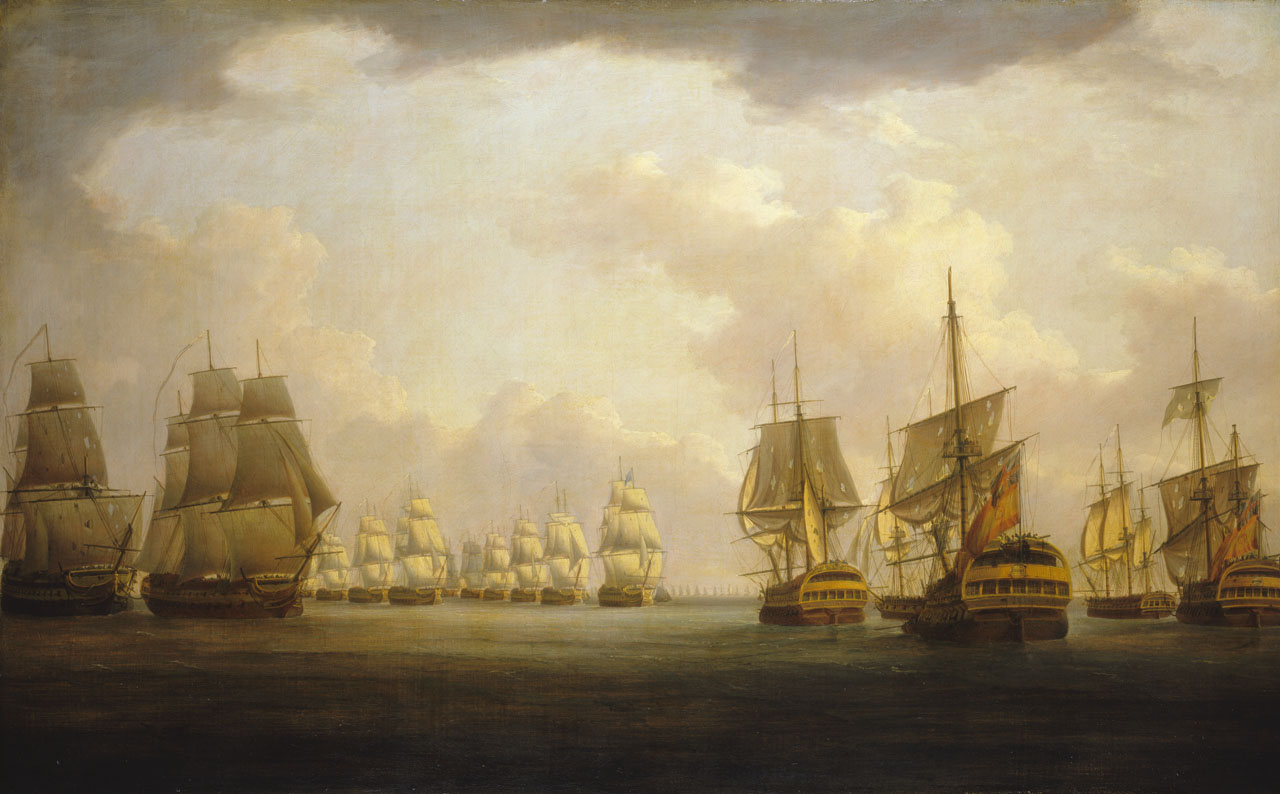
Admiral Sir Robert Calder's action off Cape Finisterre, 23 July 1805, by William Anderson

Nelson gave chase, but spent June in a fruitless search for the fleet after arriving in the Caribbean. Villeneuve briefly cruised around the islands before heading back to Europe in contravention of Napoleon's orders. The returning French fleet was intercepted by a British fleet under Sir Robert Calder and engaged in the Battle of Cape Finisterre, but managed to reach Ferrol with only minor losses. Nelson returned to Gibraltar at the end of July and travelled to England, dismayed at his failure to bring the French to battle and expecting to be censured. To his surprise, he was given a rapturous reception from crowds who had gathered to view his arrival. Senior British officials congratulated him for sustaining the close pursuit, crediting him with saving the West Indies from a French invasion. Nelson briefly stayed in London, where he was cheered wherever he went, before visiting Merton Place to see Lady Hamilton, arriving in late August. He entertained a number of his friends and relations there over the coming month, and began plans for a grand engagement with the enemy fleet, one which would surprise his foes by forcing a pell-mell battle on them.

Captain Henry Blackwood arrived at Merton early on 2 September, bringing news of the French and Spanish fleets having combined and were currently at anchor in Cádiz. Nelson hurried to London, where he met with cabinet ministers and was given command of the fleet blockading Cádiz. While awaiting one of these meetings on 24 September with Robert Stewart, Viscount Castlereagh, the Secretary of State for War and the Colonies, Nelson and Major General Arthur Wellesley—the future Duke of Wellington—met briefly in a waiting area. Wellington was waiting to be debriefed on his Indian operations, and Nelson on his chase and future plans. Wellington later recalled, "[Nelson] entered at once into conversation with me, if I can call it conversation, for it was almost all on his side and all about himself and, in reality, a style so vain and so silly as to surprise and almost disgust me". After a few minutes, Nelson left the room, but then being informed who his companion was, returned and entered into a more earnest and intelligent discussion with the young Wellesley. This lasted for a quarter of an hour, and encompassed topics such as the war, the state of the colonies, and the geopolitical situation. On this second discussion, Wellesley recalled, "I don't know I ever had a conversation that interested me more". This was the only meeting between the two.

Nelson returned briefly to Merton to set his affairs in order and bid farewell to Emma before travelling back to London and then on to Portsmouth; arriving there early on the morning of 14 September. He had breakfast at the George Inn with his friends George Rose, the Vice-President of the Board of Trade, and George Canning, the Treasurer of the Navy. Word spread of Nelson's presence at the inn and a large crowd of well-wishers gathered. They accompanied Nelson to his barge and cheered him off, which Nelson acknowledged by raising his hat. He was recorded as having turned to his colleague and stated: "I had their huzzas before; I have their hearts now." English Romantic poet Robert Southey reported on the onlookers for Nelson's walk to the dock: "Many were in tears and many knelt down before him and blessed him as he passed."

Victory joined the British fleet off Cádiz on 27 September, and Nelson took over from Vice Admiral Cuthbert Collingwood. Nelson spent the following weeks preparing and refining his tactics for the anticipated battle and dining with his captains to ensure they understood his intentions. He devised a plan of attack which anticipated the allied fleet would form up in a traditional line of battle. Drawing on his own experience from the Nile and Copenhagen, and the examples of Duncan at Camperdown and Rodney at the Saintes, Nelson decided to split his fleet into squadrons rather than form it into a similar line parallel to the enemy. These squadrons would then cut the enemy's line in a number of places, allowing a pell-mell battle to develop. The British ships could overwhelm and destroy parts of their opponents' formation before unengaged enemy ships could come to their aid.

== Battle of Trafalgar, 1805 ==
=== Preparation ===
The combined French and Spanish fleet under Villeneuve's command numbered 33 ships of the line. Napoleon intended for Villeneuve to sail into the English Channel and cover a planned invasion of Britain. However, the entry of Austria and Russia into the war forced Napoleon to call off this invasion and transfer troops to Germany. Villeneuve was reluctant to risk engagement with the British, and this reluctance made Napoleon send Vice-Admiral François Rosily to Cádiz in order to take command of the fleet. Rosily was then to sail into the Mediterranean and land troops at Naples before making port at Toulon. Villeneuve decided to sail the fleet out before his successor could arrive. On 20 October 1805, the fleet was sighted making its way out of harbour by patrolling British frigates, and Nelson was informed they appeared to be heading west.

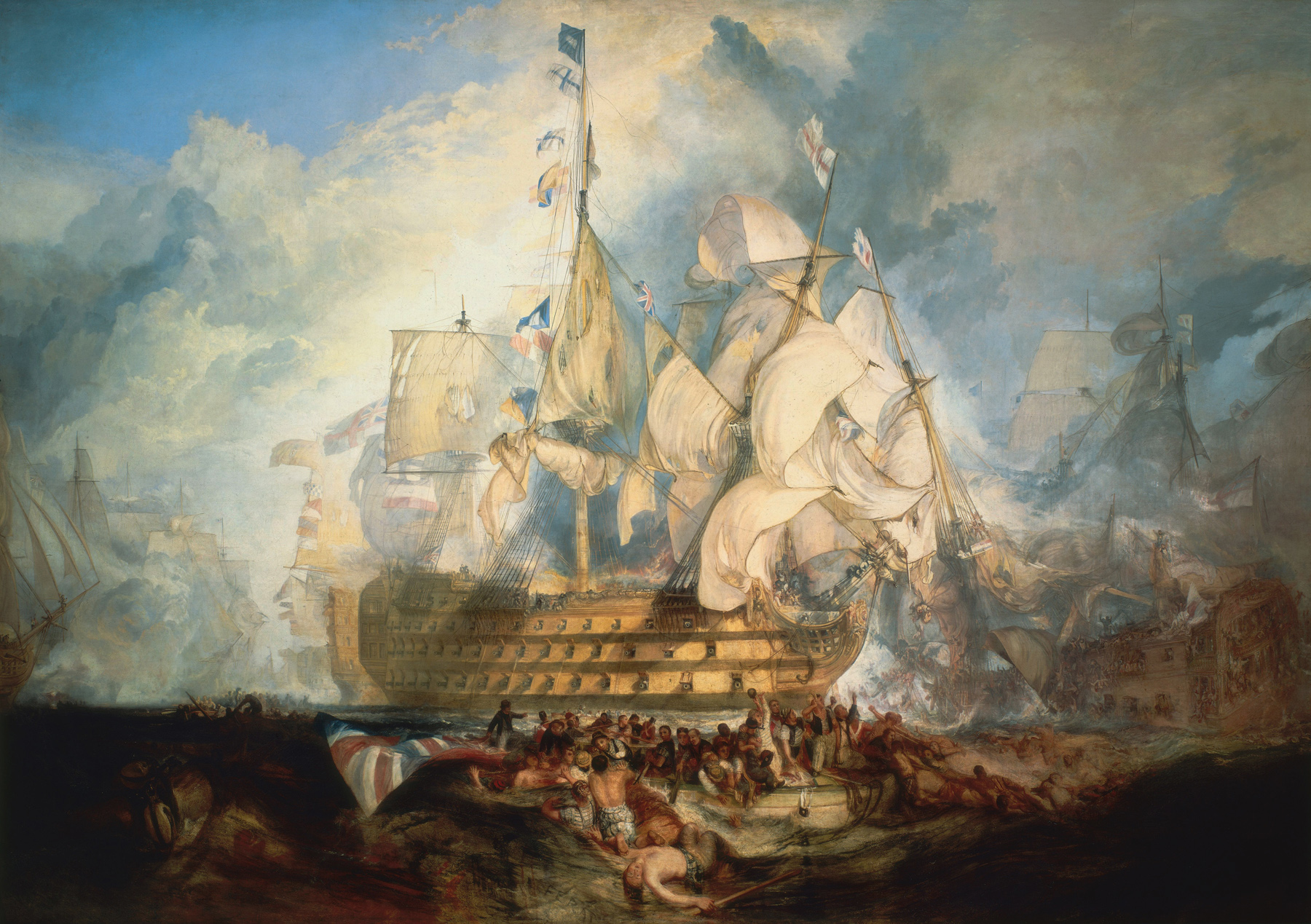
The Battle of Trafalgar by J. M. W. Turner shows the last three letters of the signal, "England expects that every man will do his duty" flying from Victory

At four o'clock on the morning of 21 October, Nelson ordered Victory to turn towards the approaching enemy fleet and signalled the rest of his force to battle stations. He then went below deck and made out his will before returning to quarterdeck to carry out an inspection. Despite having 27 ships against Villeneuve's 33, Nelson was confident of success, declaring he would not be satisfied with taking fewer than 20 prizes. He returned briefly to his cabin to write a final prayer, after which he joined Victory's signal lieutenant John Pasco and said: "Mr Pasco, I wish to say to the fleet "England confides that every man will do his duty". You must be quick, for I have one more signal to make, which is for close action".

Pasco suggested changing "confides" to "expects" which, being in the Signal Book, could be signalled by the use of a single code (three flags), whereas confides would have to be spelt out letter by letter. Nelson agreed, and the signal was hoisted. As the fleets converged, Victory's Captain Thomas Hardy suggested Nelson remove the decorations on his coat so he would not be easily identified by enemy sharpshooters. Nelson replied it was too late "to be shifting a coat", adding they were "military orders and he did not fear to show them to the enemy". (Note: Historian Nicholas A. M. Rodger disputes this claim, calling it a "myth" and saying "[Nelson] was wearing an old uniform coat with inconspicuous cloth replicas of his decorations. There is no evidence he deliberately sought or recklessly courted death, though he was certainly well enough aware of the risks of action".) Captain Henry Blackwood of the frigate HMS Euryalus suggested Nelson come aboard his ship to better observe the battle. Nelson refused, and also turned down Hardy's suggestion to let Admiral Sir Eliab Harvey's HMS Temeraire come ahead of Victory and lead the line into battle.

=== Battle is joined ===
Victory came under fire, initially passing wide, but then with greater accuracy as the distances decreased. A cannonball struck and killed Nelson's secretary John Scott, nearly cutting him in two. Hardy's clerk then took over, but he too was almost immediately killed. Victory's wheel was shot away; another cannonball cut down eight marines. Standing next to Nelson on the quarterdeck, Hardy's shoe buckle was suddenly dented by a splinter. Victory had reached the enemy line by now, and Hardy asked Nelson which ship to engage first. Nelson told him to take his pick, and Hardy moved Victory across the stern of the 80-gun French flagship Bucentaure. Victory then came under fire from the 74-gun Redoutable lying off Bucentaure's stern, as well as the 130-gun Santísima Trinidad. As enemy sharpshooters fired onto Victory's deck from their rigging, Nelson and Hardy continued directing and giving orders.

=== Wounding and death ===
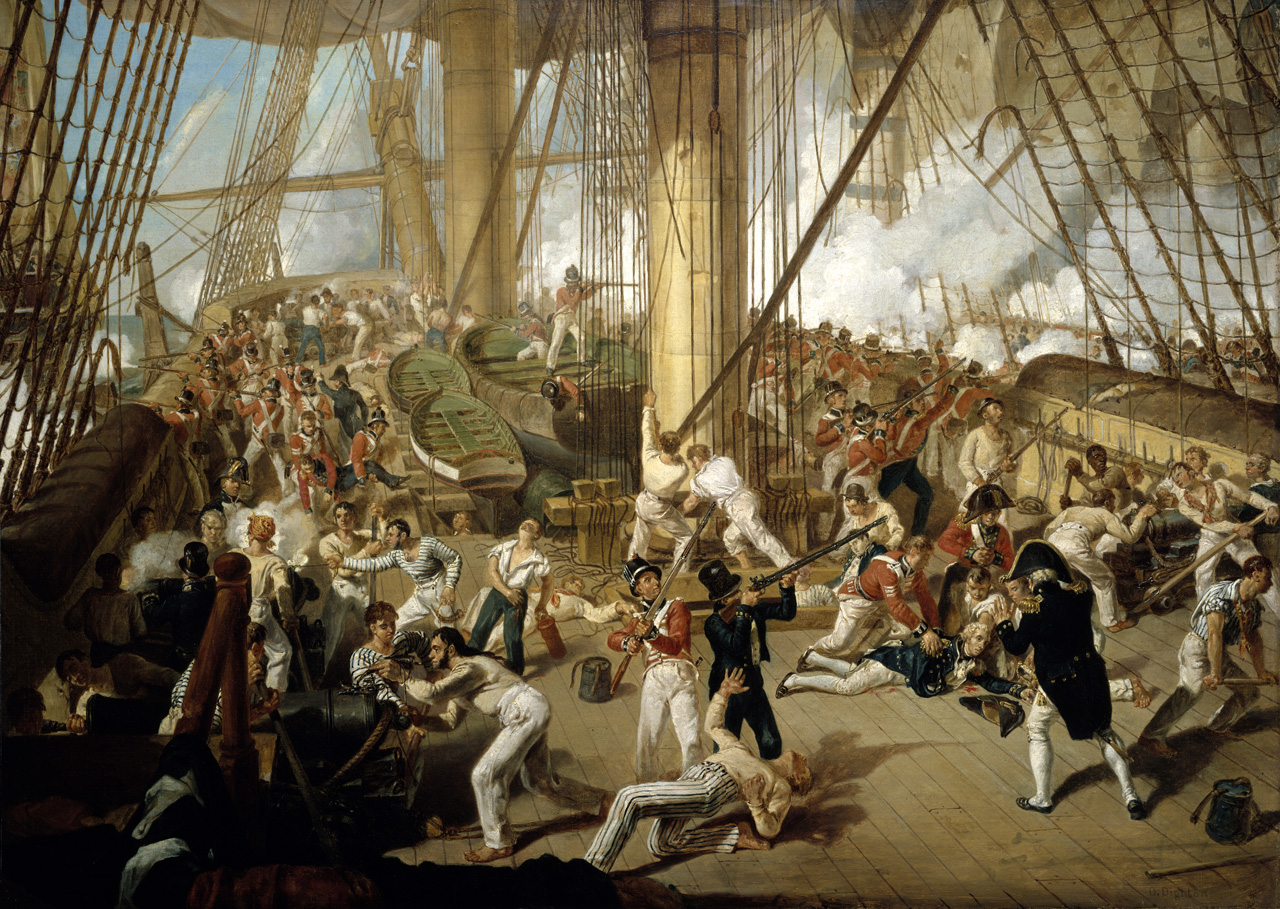
Nelson is shot on the quarterdeck. Painted by Denis Dighton, c. 1825.

At quarter-past one in the afternoon, Hardy realised Nelson was not by his side. He turned to see Nelson kneeling on the deck, supporting himself with his hand, before falling onto his side. Hardy rushed to him, at which point Nelson smiled: "Hardy, I do believe they have done it at last [...] my backbone is shot through".

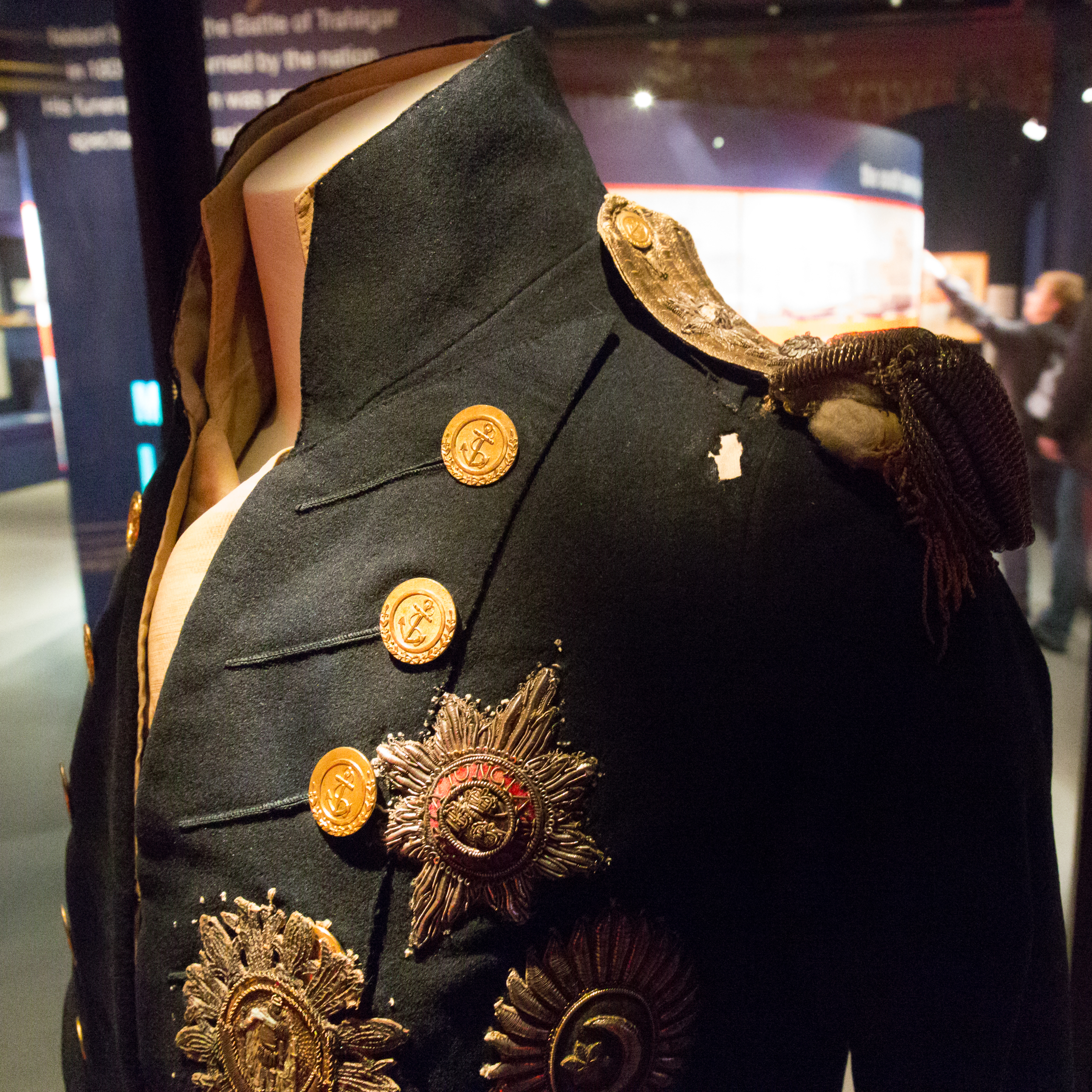
Uniform worn by Nelson at the Battle of Trafalgar (1805), his final engagement, showing the musket ball hole; now displayed at the National Maritime Museum, Greenwich

He was hit by a musket ball fired from the mizzen-top of Redoutable at a range of 50 feet (15 m). The ball entered his left shoulder, passed through a lung, then his spine at the sixth and seventh thoracic vertebrae, and lodged 2 inches (51 mm) below his right shoulder blade in the back muscles. In return, signal midshipman John Pollard, possibly together with his fellow-midshipman Francis Edward Collingwood, is said to have shot down the French marksman responsible for Nelson's death. Nelson was carried below to the cockpit by the sergeant major of marines Robert Adair, and two sailors. As he was being carried down, he asked them to pause while he gave advice to a midshipman on the handling of the tiller. He then draped a handkerchief over his face to avoid causing alarm amongst the crew. He was taken to the ship surgeon William Beatty, telling him: "You can do nothing for me. I have but a short time to live. My back is shot through".

Nelson was made comfortable, fanned, and brought lemonade and watered wine to drink after he complained of feeling hot and thirsty. He asked several times to see Hardy, who was on deck supervising the battle, and asked Beatty to remember him to Emma, his daughter, and his friends. Hardy came below deck to see Nelson just after half-past two, and informed him a number of enemy ships had surrendered. Nelson told him he was sure to die and begged him to pass his possessions on to Emma. Those with Nelson at this point were chaplain Alexander Scott, purser Walter Burke, Nelson's steward, Chevalier and Beatty. Nelson, fearing a gale was blowing up, instructed Hardy to be sure to anchor. After reminding him to "take care of poor Lady Hamilton", Nelson said: "Kiss me, Hardy". Beatty records Hardy knelt and kissed Nelson on the cheek. He then stood for a minute or two, before kissing Nelson on the forehead. Nelson asked, "Who is that?" On hearing it was Hardy, he replied, "God bless you, Hardy."

By now very weak, Nelson continued to murmur instructions to Burke and Scott, "fan, fan [...] rub, rub [...] drink, drink." Beatty had heard Nelson murmur, "Thank God I have done my duty", and when he returned, Nelson's voice had faded and his pulse was very weak. Nelson looked up as Beatty took his pulse, then closed his eyes. Scott, who remained by Nelson as he died, recorded his last words as "God and my country". Nelson died at half-past four in the afternoon, three hours after he had been shot. He was 47 years old.

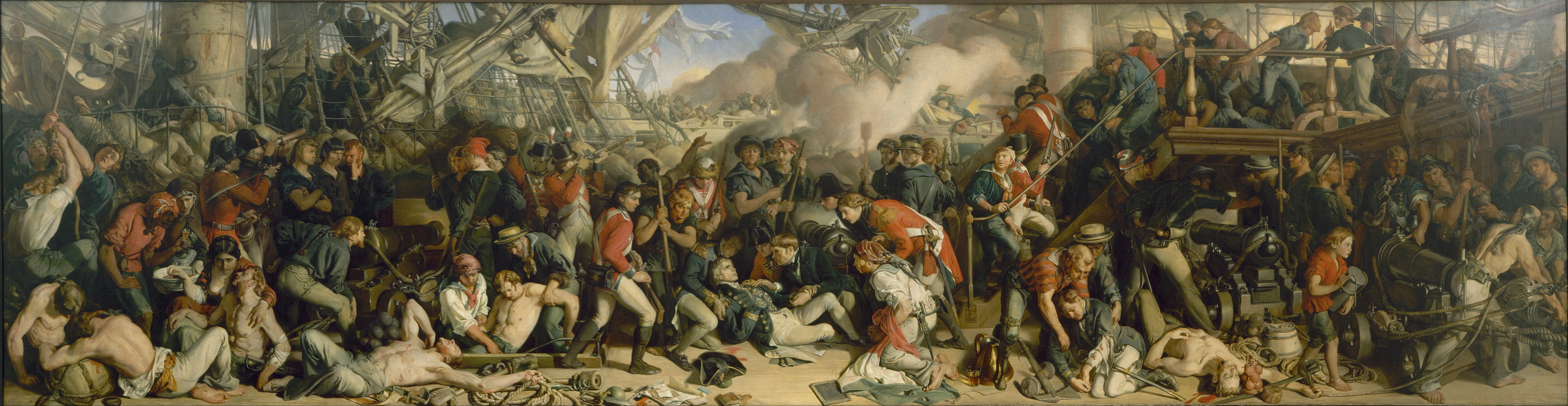
The Death of Nelson by Daniel Maclise

== Return to Britain ==
Nelson's body was placed in a cask of brandy mixed with camphor and myrrh, which was then lashed to the Victory's mainmast and placed under guard. This was a controversial decision, with the British public later believing it would have been better for him to have been put in rum instead to better preserve him. Victory was towed to Gibraltar after the battle, and on arrival his body was transferred to a lead-lined coffin filled with spirits of wine. His effects, uniforms and papers were sent separately. Collingwood's dispatches about the battle were carried to England, UK, aboard HMS Pickle, and when the news arrived in London, a messenger was sent to Merton Place to bring the news of Nelson's death to Emma Hamilton.

King George III, on receiving the news, is alleged to have said in tears, "We have lost more than we have gained." The Times reported: "We do not know whether we should mourn or rejoice. The country has gained the most splendid and decisive Victory that has ever graced the naval annals of England; but it has been dearly purchased".

== Funeral ==
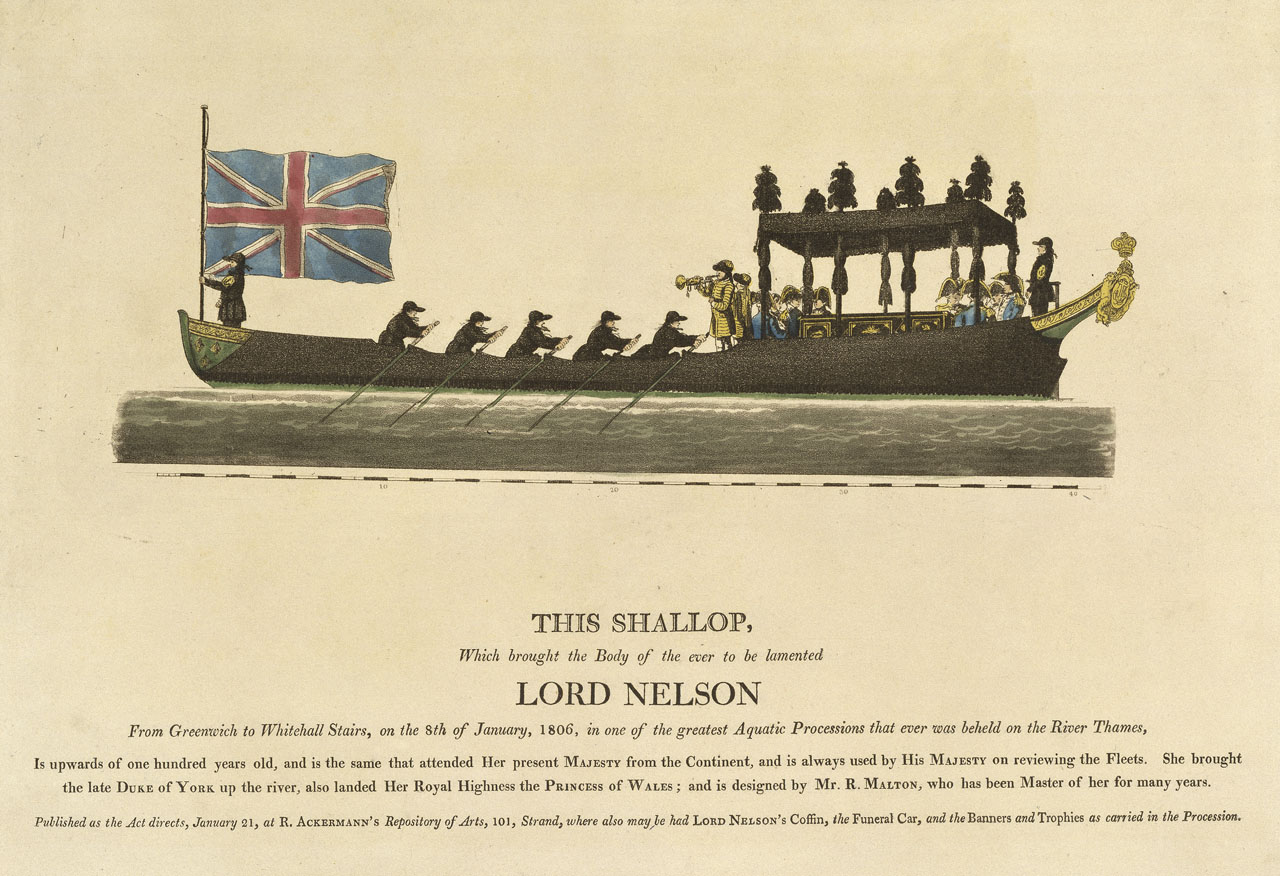
Print of the royal barge that carried Nelson's body

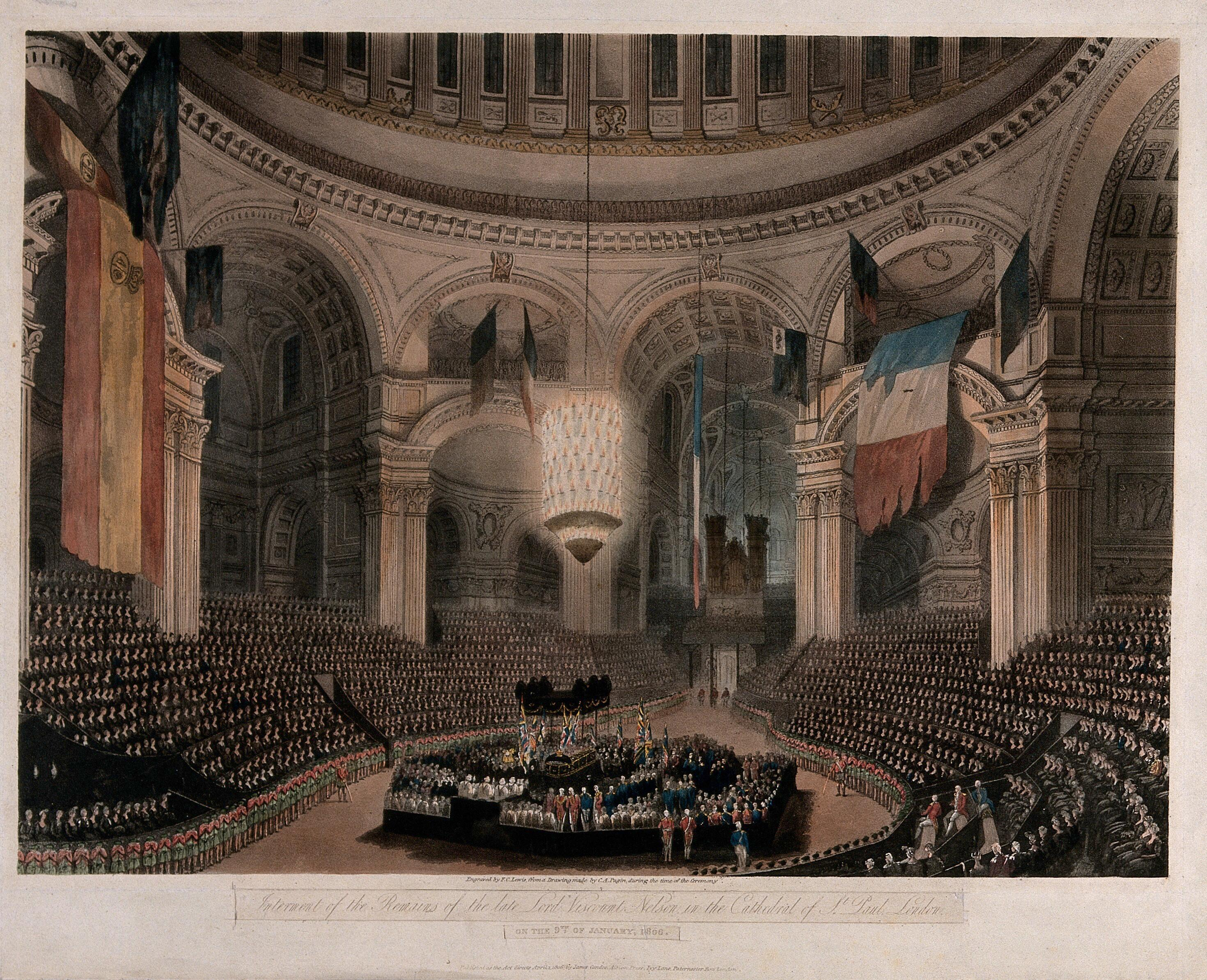
Nelson's coffin in the crossing of St Paul's, during the funeral service; the dome hung with captured French and Spanish flags

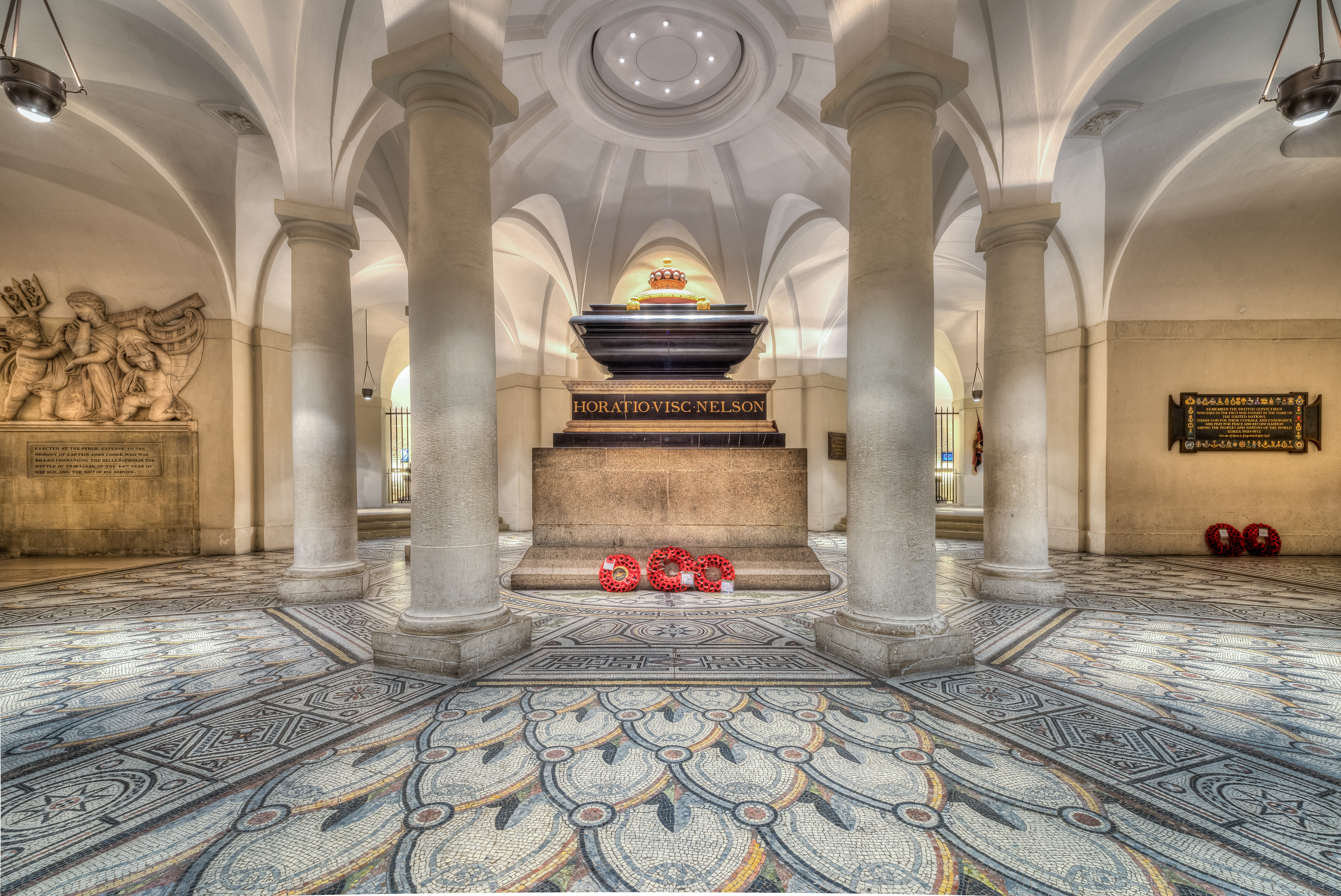
The sarcophagus of Nelson in the crypt of St Paul's

Nelson's body was unloaded from Victory at the Nore. It was conveyed upriver in Sir George Grey's yacht Chatham to Greenwich and placed inside a lead coffin. The lead coffin was then placed inside a wooden one made from the mast of L'Orient, which had been salvaged after the Battle of the Nile and given to Nelson as an ironic gift by captain Hallowell of HMS Swiftsure. He lay in state for three days in the Painted Hall of Greenwich Hospital, where the surrounding arrangements all but disintegrated under the crush of crowds far greater than authorities had anticipated. His body was then taken upriver aboard a barge originally used as King Charles II's state barge; accompanied by Lord Samuel Hood, chief mourner Sir Peter Parker, and the Prince of Wales. The Prince of Wales at first announced his intention of attending the funeral as chief mourner. However, he ultimately attended in a private capacity along with his brothers, when his father King George III reminded him it was against protocol for the heir to the throne to attend the funerals of anyone except members of the royal family.

On 8 January 1806, the coffin was taken into the Admiralty for the night, attended by Nelson's chaplain Alexander Scott. The following day, 9 January, a funeral procession consisting of 32 admirals, over 100 captains, and an escort of 10,000 soldiers took the coffin from the Admiralty to St Paul's Cathedral. After a four-hour service, he was interred within a crypt in a sarcophagus originally carved for Cardinal Wolsey; the sarcophagus and its base were previously taken over for the tomb of Henry VIII, which was never completed. The sailors were charged with folding the flag and placing it on Nelson's coffin after it was lowered through the floor of the nave; they instead tore it into fragments, each taking a piece as a memorial.

== Assessment ==
Nelson was regarded as a highly effective leader who could sympathise with his sailors' needs. According to Lambert, he based his command on love rather than authority, inspiring both his superiors and subordinates with his considerable courage, commitment and charisma—dubbed "the Nelson touch". Nelson combined this talent with an adept grasp of strategy and politics, making him a highly successful naval commander. Admiral Tōgō Heihachirō, himself often called "the Nelson of the East", placed Nelson among the greatest naval commanders in history. The memorandum Nelson wrote before Trafalgar expresses his attitude: "No captain can do very wrong if he places his ship alongside that of the enemy."

According to Lambert, Nelson's personality was complex, often characterised by a desire to be noticed both by his superiors and the public. He was easily flattered by praise, and dismayed when he felt he was not given sufficient credit for his actions. This led him to take risks and enthusiastically publicise his resultant successes, which was not always considered acceptable at the time. According to Lambert, Nelson was also highly confident in his abilities, determined and able to make important decisions. His active career meant he was considerably experienced in combat and a shrewd judge of his opponents, able to identify and exploit his enemies' weaknesses. However, he was often prone to insecurities and violent mood swings, and was extremely vain; he loved to receive decorations and tributes. According to Lambert, despite Nelson's personality, he remained a highly professional leader and was driven all his life by a strong sense of duty. Nelson's fame reached new heights after his death and he came to be regarded as one of Britain's greatest military heroes by the British populace, ranked alongside John Churchill, 1st Duke of Marlborough, and Arthur Wellesley, 1st Duke of Wellington. In the BBC's 100 Greatest Britons programme in 2002, Nelson was voted the ninth-greatest Briton of all time.

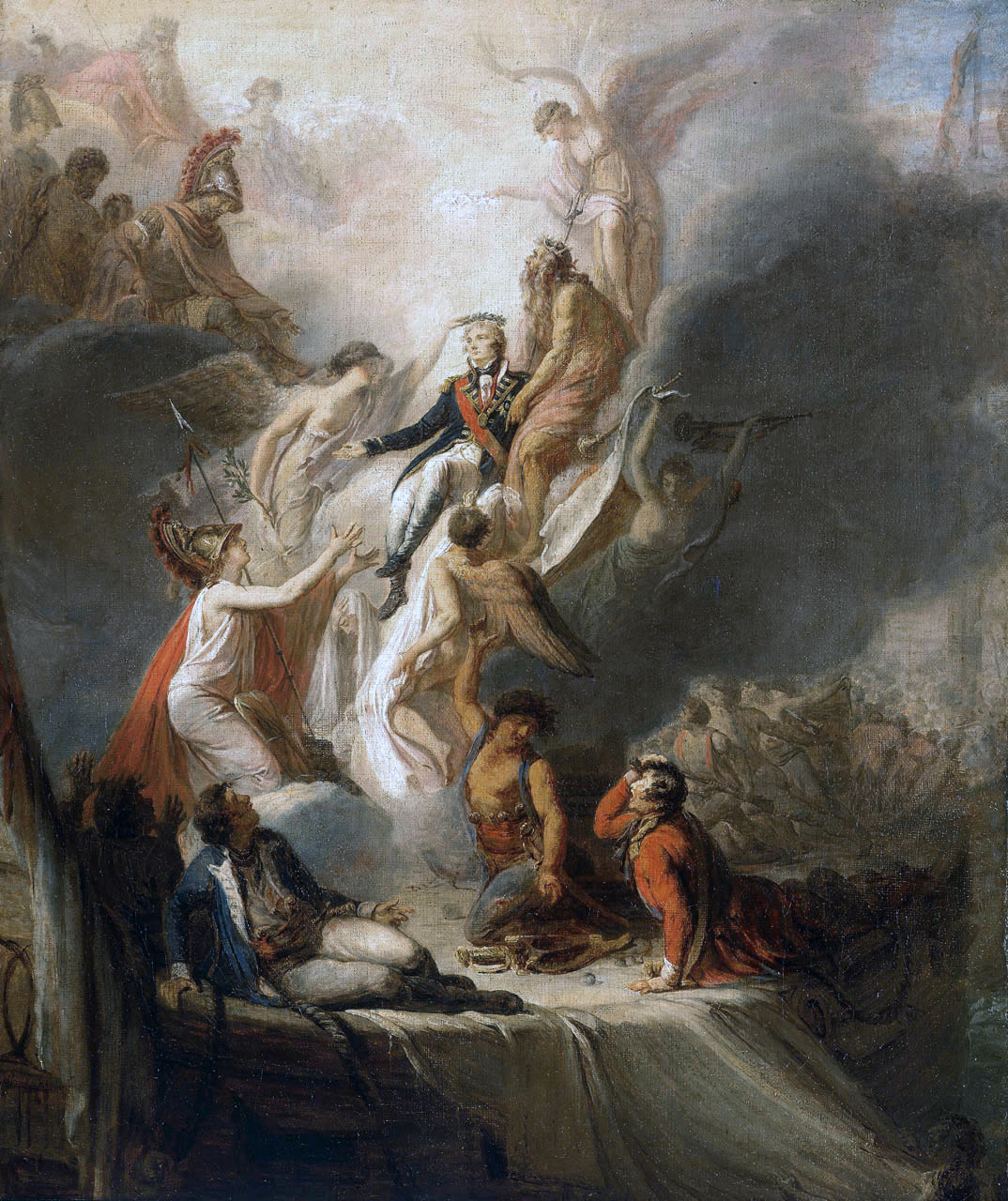
Pierre-Nicolas Legrand de Lérant's Apotheosis of Nelson, c. 1805–18. Nelson ascends into immortality as the Battle of Trafalgar rages in the background.

Aspects of Nelson's life and career were controversial, both during his lifetime and after his death. His affair with Emma Hamilton was widely remarked upon and disapproved of, to the extent that Emma was denied permission to attend his funeral. She and their daughter Horatia were also subsequently ignored by the government, which awarded Nelson's money and titles only to his legitimate family. Nelson's actions during the reoccupation of Naples have also been the subject of debate. His approval of the wave of reprisals against the Jacobins who surrendered under the terms agreed by Cardinal Ruffo, as well as his personal intervention in securing the execution of Francesco Caracciolo, are considered by some biographers such as Robert Southey to be a shameful breach of honour. A prominent contemporary, politician Charles James Fox, was among those who attacked Nelson for his actions at Naples. Other pro-republican writers produced books and pamphlets decrying the events in Naples as atrocities. Later assessments, including by Andrew Lambert, have stressed the armistice was not authorised by the King of Naples, and the retribution meted out by the Neapolitans was not unusual for the time. Lambert also suggests Nelson, in fact, acted to put an end to the bloodshed; using his ships and men to restore order in the city.

=== Views on slavery ===
While Nelson served in the West Indies, he came into contact with prominent white colonists residing there, forming friendships with many of them. These relationships led Nelson to absorb their pro-slavery views, particularly that slavery was necessary to the islands' economic prosperity. According to Grindal, Nelson later used his social influence to counter the emerging abolitionist movement in Britain. University of Southampton academic Christer Petley contextualises this view:

The debate over the future of slavery divided Britons. Wilberforce personified one type of British patriotism—arguing for an end to slave-trading on the basis that it was a blot on the reputation of a proud and Christian nation. Slaveholders offered their own patriotic arguments—maintaining that the trade was so instrumental to the imperial economy that Britain could ill-afford to stop it. Nelson had befriended several slaveholding colonists during his time in the Caribbean. Privately, he came to sympathise with their political outlook. It is clear that, by the time of his death at Trafalgar, he despised Wilberforce and stood in staunch opposition to the British abolitionist campaign.

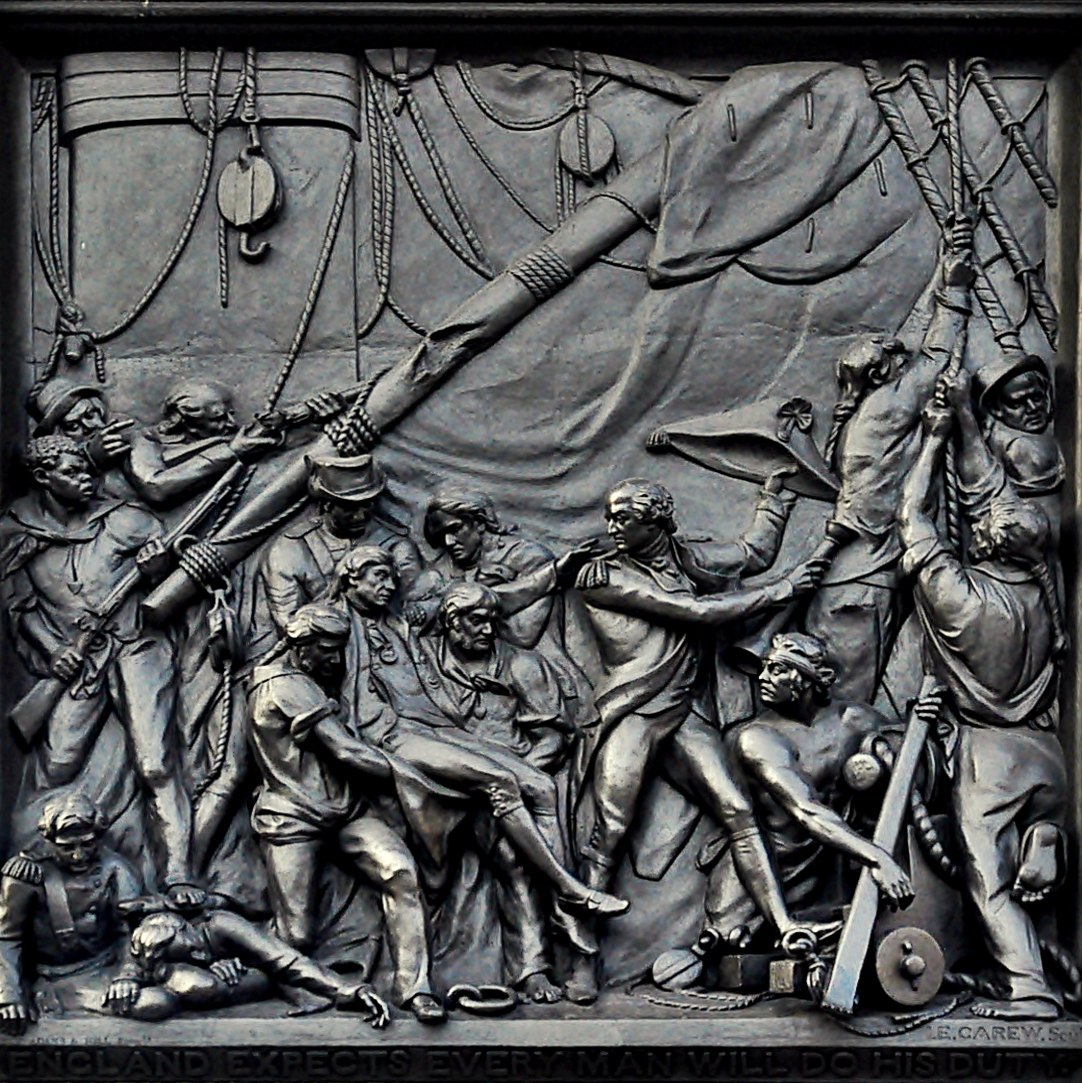
Nelson's Column – Death of Nelson at Trafalgar panel, with George Ryan standing on the left-hand edge, holding a rifle

Over the course of his life, Nelson came into contact numerous times with aspects of slavery and the people involved in it. These included his relationships with white Caribbean plantation owners and his marriage to Fanny, a slave owner white woman who was born into a family belonging to the Antiguan plantocracy. One of his friends in the West Indies was a planter named Simon Taylor, who was one of the richest plantation-owners in British Jamaica who owned hundreds of slaves. In 1805 Taylor wrote to Nelson, requesting he publicly intervene in favour of the pro-slavery side in Britain's debate over abolition. Nelson replied to Taylor, writing "while [he had] ... a tongue", he would "launch [his] voice against the damnable and cursed (sic) doctrine of Wilberforce and his hypocritical allies". In the same letter, Nelson wrote he had always "[endeavoured] to serve the Public weal, of which the West India Colonies form so prominent and interesting a part. I have ever been, and shall die, a firm friend to our present Colonial system. I was bred, as you know, in the good old school, and taught to appreciate the value of our West India possessions." This letter was published in 1807 by the anti-abolitionist faction 18 months after Nelson's death, and out of context, in an apparent attempt to bolster their cause prior to the parliamentary vote on the Abolition Bill.

=== Legacy ===
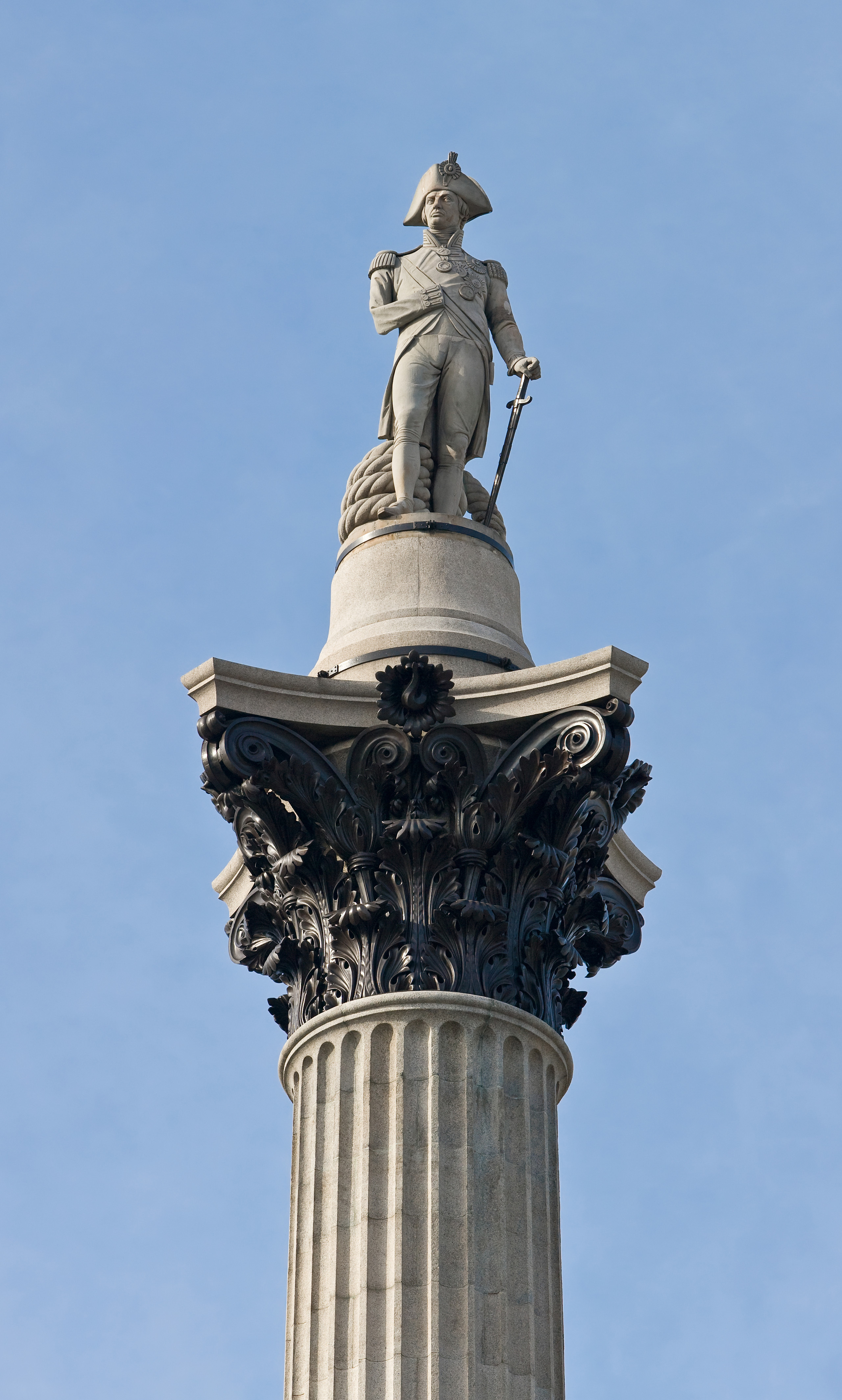
Nelson's Column in Trafalgar Square, London

Nelson's influence continued long after his death and saw periodic revivals of interest, especially during times of crisis in Britain. His death at the pivotal Battle of Trafalgar solidified his public status as a national hero. In the 1860s, Poet Laureate Alfred Tennyson appealed to the image and tradition of Nelson in order to oppose the defence cuts being made by Prime Minister William Ewart Gladstone. First Sea Lord Jackie Fisher was a keen exponent of Nelson during the early 20th century, and often emphasised his legacy during his period of naval reform. Winston Churchill also found Nelson to be a source of inspiration during the Second World War. Nelson has been frequently depicted in art and literature; appearing in paintings by Benjamin West and Arthur William Devis, and in books and biographies by John McArthur, James Stanier Clarke and Robert Southey. Nelson is also celebrated in numerous songs, written both during his life and following his death. Thomas Attwood's "Nelson's Tomb: A Favourite Song" commemorates Nelson's death at the Battle of Trafalgar.

The city of Nelson in New Zealand is named after him. A number of monuments and memorials were constructed across Britain and abroad to honour his achievements.The first memorial in Britain was an obelisk on Glasgow Green erected in 1806 and standing 44m (144 feet) high. It was refurbished in 2002.

Dublin's monument to Nelson, Nelson's Pillar, completed in 1809, was destroyed by Irish republicans in 1966. In Montreal, a statue was started in 1808 and completed in 1809. In Great Yarmouth, on the coast in his home county of Norfolk, the Britannia Monument dedicated to Nelson was erected in 1819, with dedications at the base to his four main naval victories. Others followed around the world, with London's Trafalgar Square being created in his memory in 1835 and the centrepiece Nelson's Column finished in 1843. A Royal Society of Arts blue plaque was unveiled in 1876 to commemorate Nelson at 147 New Bond Street. The architect of the Britannia Royal Naval College in Dartmouth, Sir Aston Webb, placed a window high in the chapel such that annually, on 21 October at the time of Nelson's death, the light from it falls on the statue of Christ behind the altar.

Nelson and his monuments are seen more critically in countries which felt the negative effects of colonialism and who seek to revise their public history. Major public memorials in primary locations in some cities have been subject to protest and removal as conscious acts. In 1966, the Nelson Pillar in Dublin was blown up by Irish Republicans: a novelty folk song, "Up Went Nelson", topped the Irish pop charts in the wake of the explosion, while a newspaper article marking the 55th anniversary noted: "For many, the biggest surprise about the blowing up of Nelson's Pillar...is why it took 157 years." In 2020, after years of campaigning, the Nelson Statue in National Heroes Square, in Bridgetown, Barbados, was removed and placed in a museum. It had stood since 1813 in a central public space of the capital known until 1999 as Trafalgar Square.

== Titles ==
Nelson's titles, as inscribed on his coffin and read out at the funeral by the Garter King at Arms, Sir Isaac Heard, were:

The Most Noble Lord Horatio Nelson, Viscount and Baron Nelson, of the Nile and of Burnham Thorpe in the County of Norfolk, Baron Nelson of the Nile and of Hilborough in the said County, Knight of the Most Honourable Order of the Bath, Vice Admiral of the White Squadron of the Fleet, Commander in Chief of his Majesty's Ships and Vessels in the Mediterranean, Duke of Bronte in the Kingdom of Sicily, Knight Grand Cross of the Sicilian Order of St Ferdinand and of Merit, Member of the Ottoman Order of the Crescent, Knight Grand Commander of the Order of Saint Joachim.

Nelson received large Naval Gold Medals for the battles of St Vincent, the Nile and (posthumously) Trafalgar, one of very few recipients of three such medals. Nelson was granted a royal licence in 1802 to receive and wear the foreign Order of Saint Joachim. He was made both a Knight Bachelor and Knight Companion of the Order of the Bath on 27 September 1797 for his role at Cape. St Vincent. Nelson was given the sinecure title of Colonel of Marines from 1795 to 1797, and voted a freeman of the cities and boroughs of London (10 March 1797), Bath, Salisbury and Exeter (15 January 1801), Plymouth, Monmouth, Sandwich and Oxford (22 July 1802), Hereford and Haverfordwest (in 1802), and Worcester (30 August 1802). The University of Oxford, in full Congregation, bestowed the honorary degree of Doctor of Civil Law upon Nelson on 30 July 1802. He also received other awards from various persons, governments and institutions, such as a sword with the gold hilt shaped like a crocodile from the captains who fought alongside him at the Nile.

In 1799, Nelson was created Duke of Bronte of the Kingdom of Sicily by King Ferdinand III of Sicily, and after briefly experimenting with the signature "Brontë Nelson of the Nile", he signed as "Nelson & Brontë" for the rest of his life. Nelson had no legitimate children; his daughter Horatia married the Reverend Philip Ward, with whom she had ten children before her death in 1881. Since Nelson died without legitimate issue, his viscountcy and his barony created in 1798, both "of the Nile and of Burnham Thorpe in the County of Norfolk", became extinct upon his death. However, the barony created in 1801, "of the Nile and of Hilborough in the County of Norfolk", passed by a special remainder to Nelson's older brother William Nelson, as it included Nelson's father and sisters and their male issue. In November 1805, William Nelson was created Earl Nelson and Viscount Merton, of Trafalgar and of Merton in the County of Surrey, in recognition of his late brother's services, and he also inherited the dukedom of Bronte.

=== Armorial bearings ===
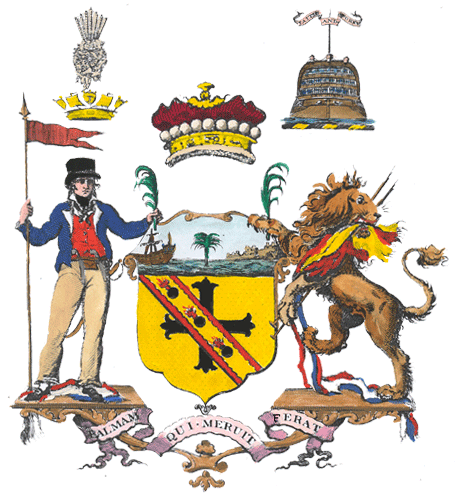
Contemporary drawing of Nelson's heraldic achievement before the Battle of Trafalgar

Arms were granted and confirmed on 20 October 1797. Nelson's paternal arms (Or, a cross flory sable over all a bendlet gules) were augmented to honour his naval victories. After the Battle of Cape St. Vincent, Nelson was granted heraldic supporters of a sailor and a lion. In honour of the Battle of the Nile in 1798, the Crown granted him an augmentation of honour blazoned On a chief wavy argent a palm tree between a disabled ship and a ruinous battery all issuant from waves of the sea all proper (deemed a notorious example of debased heraldry – comparatively uncommon in European heraldry). The grant added the Latin motto Palmam qui meruit ferat ("let him who has earned it bear the palm"), and added to his supporters a palm branch in the hand of the sailor and in the paw of the lion, and a "tri-colored flag and staff in the mouth of the latter".

After Nelson's death, his elder brother and heir William Nelson, 1st Earl Nelson, was granted a further augmentation: On a fess wavy overall azure the word TRAFALGAR or. This additional augmentation was not used by those who succeeded him in the earldom, including the present Earl Nelson.

Original coat of arms of the house of Nelson

Coat of arms after 1797

Coat of arms used after the Battle of the Nile. An example of debased heraldry.

Coat of arms used by William Nelson

== See also ==
- Bibliography of 18th–19th century Royal Naval history
- Nelson hold – grappling hold sometimes attributed to Nelson's tactics
- Turning a blind eye – pertaining to Nelson's use of a telescope to not see a signal
- England expects that every man will do his duty -one of his most famous messages before the Battle of Trafalgar

== Bibliography ==
- Adkin, Mark (2007). The Trafalgar Companion: A Guide to History's Most Famous Sea Battle and the Life of Admiral Lord Nelson. London: Aurum Press. ISBN 978-1845130183.
- Bradford, Ernle (2005). Nelson: The Essential Hero. Wordsworth Military Library. ISBN 1-8402-2202-6.
- Bryant, Arthur (1970). Nelson. London: Collins.
- Coleman, Terry (2001). Nelson: The Man and the Legend. Bloomsbury. ISBN 0-7475-5900-7.
- Coleman, Terry (2004). The Nelson Touch: The Life and Legend of Horatio Nelson. Oxford University Press. ISBN 978-0199924059.
- Dane, Clemence (1942). The Nelson Touch: An Anthology of Lord Nelson's Letters. London: Heinemann.
- Goodwin, Peter (2002). Nelson's Ships: A History Of The Vessels In Which He Served: 1771–1805. London: Conway Maritime Press. ISBN 0-8117-1007-6.
- Grindal, Peter (2016). Opposing the Slavers: The Royal Navy's Campaign against the Atlantic Slave Trade. London: I.B. Tauris & Co. ISBN 978-1788312868.
- Hannay, David McDowall (1911). "Nelson, Horatio Nelson, Viscount" . In Chisholm, Hugh (ed.). Encyclopædia Britannica. Vol. 19 (11th ed.). Cambridge University Press. pp. 352–358.
- Haydn, Joseph (1851). The Book of Dignities. Longmans, Brown, Green, and Longmans.
- Hayward, Joel S. A. (2003). For God and Glory: Lord Nelson and His Way of War. Naval Institute Press. ISBN 1-5911-4351-9.
- Hibbert, Christopher (1994). Nelson. A Personal History. Basic Books. ISBN 0-2014-0800-7.
- Howarth, David (1969). Trafalgar. The Nelson Touch. London: Collins.
- Howarth, David & Stephen (1988). Nelson. The Immortal Memory. London: J. M. Dent & Sons.
- Joslin, E.C.; Litherland, E.C.; Simpkin, B.T. (1988). British Battles and Medals. Spink. ISBN 0-9076-0525-7.
- Knight, Roger (2005). The Pursuit of Victory: The Life and Achievement of Horatio Nelson. New York: Basic Books. ISBN 0-4650-3764-X.
- Lambert, Andrew (2004). Nelson: Britannia's God of War. London: Faber and Faber. ISBN 0-5712-1222-0.
- Lavery, Brian (2003). Nelson and the Nile. London: Caxton Editions. ISBN 1-8406-7522-5.
- Lee, Christopher (2005). Nelson and Napoleon, The Long Haul to Trafalgar. headline books. p. 560. ISBN 0-7553-1041-1.
- Naish, George P. B. (1958). Nelson's Letters to his Wife and other documents 1785–1831. London: Navy Records Society.
- Nelson, Horatio, Lord Viscount, The Dispatches and Letters of Vice Admiral Lord Viscount Nelson: With Notes by Sir Nicholas Harris Nicolas G.C.M.G., The First Volume, 1777 to August 1794, Henry Colburn, London, 1844
- Nelson, Horatio, Lord Viscount, The Dispatches and Letters of Vice Admiral Lord Viscount Nelson: With Notes by Sir Nicholas Harris Nicolas G.C.M.G., The Third Volume, January 1798 to August 1799, Henry Colburn, London, 1845
- Oman, Carola (1987). Nelson. London: Hodder & Stoughton. ISBN 0-340-40672-0.
- Pettigrew, Thomas (1849). Memoirs of the Life of Vice-Admiral, Lord Viscount Nelson, K. B., Duke of Bronte. London: T. & W. Boone.
- Pocock, Tom (1987). Horatio Nelson. London: The Bodley Head. ISBN 0-370-31124-8.
- Sugden, John (2004). Nelson: A Dream of Glory. London: Jonathan Cape. ISBN 0-224-06097-X.
- Sugden, John (2013). Nelson: The Sword of Albion. New York: Henry Holt and Co. ISBN 978-080507807-7.
- von Pivka, Otto (1980). Navies of the Napoleonic Era. Hippocrene Books. ISBN 0-88254-505-1.
- Warner, Oliver (1958). A Portrait of Lord Nelson. London: Chatto & Windus.
- White, Colin (2002). The Nelson Encyclopedia. Royal Naval Museum, Stackpole Books. ISBN 9780811700139.
- White, Colin (2005). Nelson, The New Letters. Boydell Press. ISBN 1-84383-130-9.
- Wilkinson, Clennell (1931). Nelson. London: George G. Harrap.
- Willis, Sam (2014). In the Hour of Victory: The Royal Navy at War in the Age of Nelson. W.W. Norton & Company.
- Wright, Thomas (1874). The History of France from the Earliest Period to the Present Time. Vol. II. London and New York: The London Printing and Publishing Company. OCLC 319938296.

Military offices
Preceded by Viscount Keith	Commander-in-Chief, Mediterranean Fleet; 1803–1805	Succeeded by Lord Collingwood
Peerage of the United Kingdom
New title	Baron Nelson (of the Nile and of Hillborough); 1801–1805	Succeeded by William Nelson
Titles of nobility
New creation	Duke of Bronte (in the Kingdom of Sicily); 1799–1805	Succeeded by William Nelson
