= Alexander Hood, 1st Viscount Bridport (British Army officer) =

British soldier and courtier (1814–1904)

General The Right Honourable The Viscount Bridport GCB DL
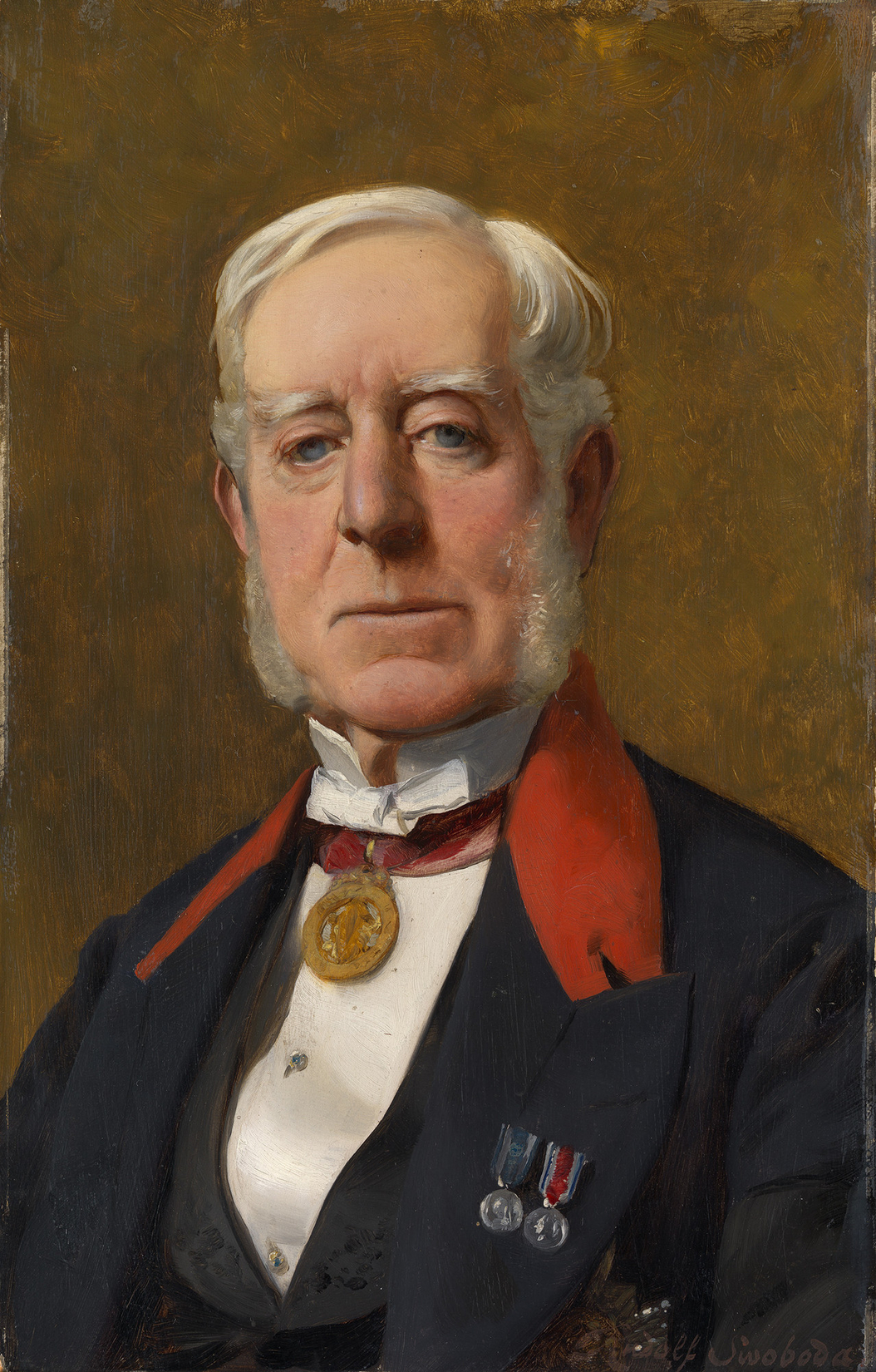
- Portrait by Rudolf Swoboda

Personal details
- Born: 23 December 1814 Marylebone, London
- Died: 4 June 1904 (aged 89) Royal Lodge, Windsor, Berkshire
- Awards: Knight Grand Cross of the Order of the Bath

Military service
- Allegiance: United Kingdom
- Branch/service: British Army
- Rank: General
- Unit: Royal Scots Fusiliers

Arms of the Viscount Bridport: 1st and 4th, Azure a fret Argent on a Chief Or three Crescents Sable (Hood); 2nd and 3rd, Or a Cross patonce Sable a Bend Gules surmounted of another engrailed of the field charged with three Bombs fired proper on a Chief undulated Argent waves of the Sea from which a Palm Tree issuant between a Disabled Ship on the dexter and a Battery in Ruins on the sinister all proper over all a Fess wavy Azure thereon inscribed the word "Trafalgar" Or (Nelson)

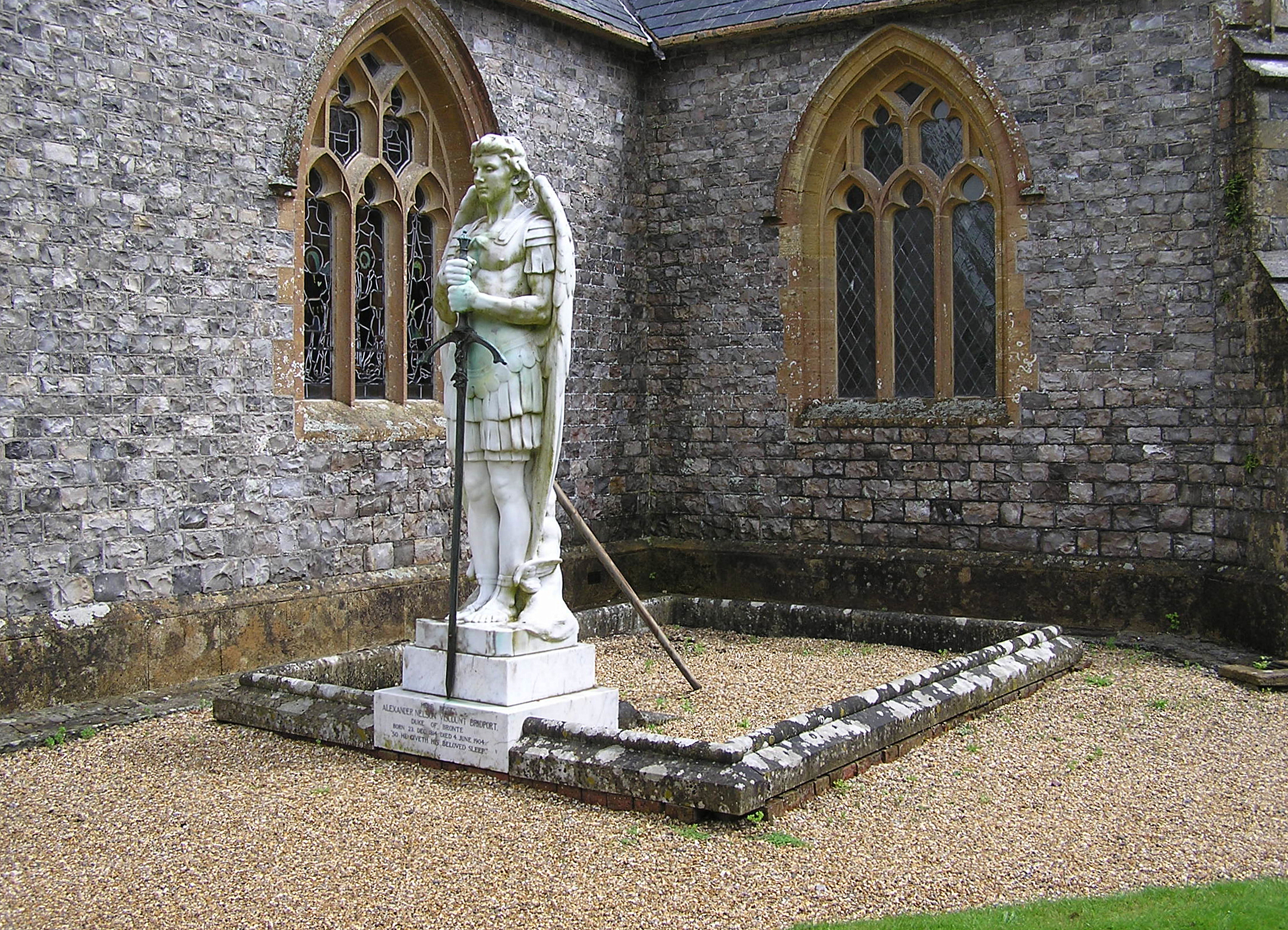
Monument and grave of Alexander Hood, 1st Viscount Bridport, in the churchyard of Cricket Saint Thomas. The figure represents Saint Michael

General Alexander Nelson Hood, 1st Viscount Bridport, 4th Duke of Bronte, GCB, DL (23 December 1814 – 4 June 1904) was a British Army officer and courtier.

== Origins ==
He was the eldest and only surviving son and heir of Samuel Hood, 2nd Baron Bridport (1788–1868) of Redlynch in Wiltshire and of Cricket St Thomas in Wiltshire, a younger grandson of Admiral Samuel Hood, 1st Viscount Hood (1724–1816) of Catherington in Hampshire, elder brother of Admiral Alexander Hood, 1st Viscount Bridport, 1st Baron Bridport (1726–1814), of Cricket St Thomas. His father Samuel was the heir to the estates his childless great-uncle Alexander Hood, 1st Viscount Bridport, and by special remainder to his title Baron Bridport in the Peerage of Ireland.

His mother was Charlotte Hood, 3rd Duchess of Bronte (1787–1873), only child of Rev. William Nelson, 1st Earl Nelson, 2nd Duke of Bronte (1757–1835) of Standlynch in Wiltshire, elder brother and heir of the great Admiral Horatio Nelson, 1st Viscount Nelson, 1st Duke of Bronte (1758–1805). Although his mother Charlotte had inherited her father's Sicilian dukedom, his British titles descended by special remainder, together with his British estates, to his nephew Thomas Bolton (1786–1835), who having assumed the surname "Nelson" in accordance with the terms of the bequest became Thomas Nelson, 2nd Earl Nelson.

== Created Viscount Bridport ==
In 1868 he succeeded his father as 3rd Baron Bridport and six months later in the same year the viscountcy held by his great-great-uncle was revived when he was created Viscount Bridport, "of Cricket St Thomas in the County of Somerset and of Bronte in the Kingdom of Italy". In 1873 he also succeeded his mother as 4th Duke of Bronte.

== Career ==
=== Military career ===
He was commissioned into the Royal Scots Fusiliers in 1831 and achieved the rank of captain in 1836, lieutenant colonel in 1847, colonel in 1854, major general in 1862, lieutenant general in 1871 and general in 1877.

=== Career at court ===
He was a courtier to Queen Victoria and later to her son King Edward VII. He served as a Groom-in-Waiting from 1841 to 1858, Clerk Marshal to Prince Albert from 1853 to 1861, Equerry to Queen Victoria from 1858 to 1884, was a Permanent Lord-in-waiting to Queen Victoria from 1884 to 1901 and Honorary Equerry to King Edward VII from 1901 to 1904. He served as a Deputy Lieutenant of Dorset, Devon and Somerset. He was appointed a Knight Commander of the Order of the Bath in 1885 and a Knight Grand Cross of the Order of the Bath in 1891.

== Sells Cricket St Thomas ==
In the 1883 publication The Great Landowners of Great Britain and Ireland his estate is listed as 5,512 acres (3,103 in Somerset, 2,356 in Dorset and 53 in Devon) valued at £8,098 per annum. His Bronte estate in Sicily was about 25,000 hectares (61,774 acres), with considerable feudal powers.

In 1898, six years before his death, he sold his heavily mortgaged seat and estate at Cricket St Thomas in Somerset to the chocolate manufacturer Francis Fry (d.1918). The estate had been purchased in 1775 by the 1st Viscount Bridport who in 1786 had rebuilt the house to the designs of the architect Sir John Soane (1753–1837).

== Visits to Sicilian estate ==
In 1864, during the lifetime of his mother the 3rd Duchess of Bronte, he made a short visit, accompanied by his wife and sons Arthur and William, to her Sicilian estate comprising the Duchy of Bronte, created for Admiral Lord Nelson in 1799 by King King Ferdinand III of Sicily. Although the Admiral had been enthusiastic about his new duchy and had ordered the monastic buildings which formed its seat to be restored and embellished at his great cost, neither he nor his brother and heir the 2nd Duke ever set foot on the property, the first to have done so having been the 3rd Duchess, who paid a short visit in the 1830s or 1840s, but was unfavourably impressed with the primitive nature of the countryside and the entire absence of roads on the estate which necessitated travel by mule litter. The estate was run by a local agent and by correspondence. He made a second visit in Autumn 1868, again during the lifetime of his mother, accompanied by his daughter Adelaide and his 14-year-old son Alexander, who took an instant liking to it and whom he later appointed as 5th Duke.

== Marriage & issue ==
In 1838 he married Lady Mary Penelope Hill (1817–1884, died at 12 Wimpole Street, London), a daughter of Arthur Hill, 3rd Marquess of Downshire, by whom he had issue six sons and four daughters as follows:

=== Sons ===
- Arthur Wellington Alexander Nelson Hood, 2nd Viscount Bridport (1839–1924), eldest son and heir, who lived in Guernsey, Channel Islands. He inherited, under law, his father's British titles, but not his Sicilian dukedom which was able to be bequeathed to whomsoever the holder desired.
- Commander Hon. Horatio Nelson Sandys Hood (24 Mar 1843 - 3 Feb 1881)
- Lt. Hon. William Nelson Hood (6 Jan 1848 - 25 Oct 1921)
- Hon. Sir Alexander Nelson Hood, 5th Duke of Bronte (28 Jun 1854 - 1 Jun 1937), of Castello di Maniace, Bronte and "La Falconara", Taormina, both in Sicily, a courtier. He was bequeathed by his father the Sicilian dukedom and its vast estate and was the first in his family to make his home there. He died unmarried.
- Hon. Alfred Nelson Hood (1 Oct 1858 - 1 Dec 1918).
- Hon. Victor Albert Nelson Hood (14 Nov 1862 - 1 May 1929), Companion of the Order of St Michael and St George (CMG) (1916), lived for 25 years in Australia where he served as Private Secretary to the Governor of South Australia (1903–5), Private Secretary to the Governor of Victoria (1906–20), Chamberlain to the Governor-General of Australia (1911), Private Secretary to the Governor of Western Australia (1912–13), Private Secretary to the Governor of New South Wales (1913). He later served under his brother the 5th Duke of Bronte in the administration of the Bronte estate in Sicily. He married Mrs Violet Annie McBean, widow of Alec McBean of Kirndean, New South Wales, Australia, but left no issue.

=== Daughters ===
- Hon. Nina Maria Hood (d. 5 Jun 1923)
- Hon. Adelaide Fanny Hood (d. 17 Jan 1927)
- Hon. Rosa Penelope Hood (d. 17 Mar 1922), wife of William Herbert Evans (d.1900), DL, of Forde Abbey in Dorset. She died at her brother's house in Taormina, in the garden of which she was initially buried with him, before being transferred to the ducal graveyard at Maniace following the sale of "La Falconara" in 1948.
- Hon. Mary Hood (4 Jun 1846 - 6 Apr 1909), married Hugh Seymour (22 Oct 1843 - 23 Mar 1912) in Windsor 16 Apr 1868

== Death, burial & succession ==
He died in June 1904, aged 89, at Royal Lodge, Windsor, having survived his wife by twenty years. He was buried in the churchyard of Cricket St Thomas, next to the church, where his monument survives, comprising a lifesize white marble standing figure of St Michael the Archangel. A note in the church states that for many years the statue was laid flat, as the white figure at night scared too many locals. He was succeeded in his British titles by his eldest son Arthur Wellington Alexander Nelson Hood, 2nd Viscount Bridport (1839–1924) and was succeeded in his Sicilian dukedom by his 4th son Hon. Sir Alexander Nelson Hood, 5th Duke of Bronte (1854–1937).

Peerage of Ireland
| Preceded by Samuel Hood | Baron Bridport; 1868–1904 | Succeeded by Arthur Wellington Alexander Nelson Hood |
Peerage of the United Kingdom
| New creation | Viscount Bridport; 1868–1904 | Succeeded by Arthur Wellington Alexander Nelson Hood |
Titles of nobility
| Preceded by Charlotte Mary Nelson | Duke of Bronte; Kingdom of the Two Sicilies; 1873–1904 | Succeeded by Sir Alexander Nelson Hood, 5th Duke of Bronte |
