= Samuel Hood, 2nd Baron Bridport =

British politician

The Right Honourable Lord Bridport
- Bridport in 1862

Member of Parliament for Heytesbury
- In office 1812–1818 Serving with Charles Duncombe
- Preceded by: Dr Charles Moore; Viscount FitzHarris
- Succeeded by: George James Welbore Agar-Ellis; William Henry John Scott

Personal details
- Born: Samuel Hood; 7 September 1788
- Died: 6 January 1868 (aged 79)
- Spouse: Charlotte Mary Nelson (m. 1810; died 1868)
- Children: 7
- Parent(s): Henry Hood, 2nd Viscount Hood; Jane Wheeler
- Education: Trinity College, Cambridge

Samuel Hood, 2nd Baron Bridport (7 September 1788 – 6 January 1868) was a British politician.

== Early life ==
Arms of Hood, Baron Bridport (1794), Viscount Bridport (1868): Azure, a fret argent on a chief or three crescents sable.

He was born in 1788, the second son of Henry Hood, 2nd Viscount Hood (1753–1836), Chamberlain of the Household to Queen Caroline and the former Jane Wheeler (c. 1754–1847).

His paternal grandparents were Samuel Hood, 1st Viscount Hood, a naval officer, and the former Susannah Linzee (a daughter of Edward Linzee). His mother was the daughter and heiress of Francis Wheeler of Whitley Hall near Coventry in Warwickshire, and Jane Smith (a daughter of the banker Abel Smith of Nottingham). (Note: Abel Smith (1686–1756), was a son of Thomas Smith, the founder of Smith's Bank in Nottingham. He was father to Sir George Smith, 1st Baronet "of East Stoke in the County of Nottingham" and of Abel Smith II, MP. Members of the Wheeler and Hood families were buried in St Michael's Church in Coventry.)

He was educated at Trinity College, Cambridge, obtaining an M.A. degree in 1809.

== Career ==
He was returned as a Tory Member of Parliament for Heytesbury, Wiltshire in 1812, although he appears to have lost interest in Parliament after succeeding to the peerage and did not stand for re-election in 1818.

In 1814, soon after the death in action of his elder brother, he succeeded his childless great-uncle Admiral Alexander Hood, 1st Viscount Bridport, 1st Baron Bridport as Baron Bridport, under the special remainder of that title in the Peerage of Ireland.

== Personal life ==
Arms of William Nelson, 1st Earl Nelson, 2nd Duke of Bronte, being the augmented arms of his younger brother Admiral Horatio Nelson further augmented with a fess wavy azure thereon inscribed the word "Trafalgar" or. Today quartered by Hood, Viscount Bridport, descendants of the 1st Earl's daughter, the 3rd Duchess of Bronte.

On 3 July 1810 in the parish of Marylebone, London, Hood married Charlotte Mary Nelson (1787–1873), only surviving child and heiress of the Rev. William Nelson, 1st Earl Nelson, 2nd Duke of Bronte, (Note: Rev. William Nelson, 1st Earl Nelson, 2nd Duke of Bronte (1757–1835) was Rector of Brandon Parva and later of Hilborough, both in Norfolk, from 1814 seated at Trafalgar Park, Downton in Wiltshire and at nearby Redlynch House in Wiltshire. The 2nd Duke was a younger brother and heir of Admiral Horatio Nelson, 1st Viscount Nelson, 1st Duke of Bronte (1758–1805).) and the former Sarah Yonge (a daughter of Rev. Henry Yonge). Together, they were the parents of two sons and five daughters, including:

- Hon. Mary Sophia Hood (1811–1888), who married, as his second wife, John Lee Lee, MP for Wells, in 1841.
- Hon. Charlotte Hood (1813–1906), who married Horace William Noel Rochfort, son of Col. John Staunton Rochfort, in 1845.
- Hon. Jane Sarah Hood (1817–1907), who married Hugh Holbech, son of William Holbech (son of William Holbech), in 1838. After his death in 1849, she married Capt. Sir Charles Hotham, Governor of Victoria and son of Rev. Hon. Frederick Hotham (a son of the 2nd Baron Hotham), in 1853. After his death in 1855, she married Capt. William Armytage of the Royal Navy, brother to Sir George Armytage, 5th Baronet, both sons of John Armytage, in 1860.
- Hon. Catherine Louisa Hood (1818–1893), who married Henry Hall of Barton Abbey in 1837.
- Hon. Frances Caroline Hood (1821–1903), who married Sir John Walrond, 1st Baronet, son of Benjamin Bowes Walrond, in 1845.
- Alexander Nelson Hood, 1st Viscount Bridport (1814–1904), also 4th Duke of Bronte; he married Lady Mary Penelope Hill, a daughter of Arthur Hill, 3rd Marquess of Downshire, in 1838.
- Hon. Horatio Nelson Hood (1826–1832), who died young.

Hood died on 6 January 1868. He was succeeded by his eldest son, Alexander who was later created Viscount Bridport in the Peerage of the United Kingdom and inherited the dukedom of Bronte from his mother upon her death in 1873.

=== Italian titles and estates ===
Following the death of her father in 1835, his wife Charlotte, then known as Lady Bridport, inherited her father's Sicilian dukedom becoming suo jure 3rd Duchess of Bronte, however, his British titles descended by special remainder, together with his British estates, to his nephew Thomas Bolton, who assumed the surname "Nelson" in accordance with the terms of the bequest.

Through his wife he inherited the Castello di Nelson, a grand manor house built by Horatio Nelson, and its large estate between Bronte and Maniace in Sicily on the north-west foothills of Mount Etna, held by his descendants until 1982. He found the local inhabitants "turbulent, restless people" troublesome to the management of the estate, and like his brother the Admiral he never set foot in it.

=== Descendants ===
Through his daughter Charlotte, he was a grandfather of Maj.-Gen. Sir Alexander Nelson Rochfort (1850–1916), who served as Lieutenant Governor of Jersey.

Through his son Alexander, he was a grandfather of Arthur Hood, 2nd Viscount Bridport (1839–1924); Commander Hon. Horatio Nelson Sandys Hood (1843–1881); Hon. Sir Alexander Nelson Hood, 5th Duke of Bronte (1854–1937); Hon. Alfred Nelson Hood (1858–1918); Hon. Victor Albert Nelson Hood (1862–1929), Chamberlain to the Governor-General of Australia and Private Secretary to the Governor of Western Australia and the Governor of New South Wales; and Hon. Mary Hood (1846–1909) (wife of Hugh Seymour, 6th Marquess of Hertford).

Through his daughter Frances, he was a grandfather of William Walrond, 1st Baron Waleran (1849–1925); Arthur Melville Walrond (1861–1946); Katherine Mary Walrond (1846–1934), who married Charles Arthur Williams Troyte of Huntsham Court; Margaret Walrond, who married Charles Hepburn-Stuart-Forbes-Trefusis, 20th Baron Clinton of Heatnton Satchville; and Gertrude Walrond (1853–1920), who married Sir Thomas Dyke Acland, 12th Baronet, of Holnicote.

Parliament of the United Kingdom
Preceded by Dr Charles Moore; Viscount FitzHarris	Member of Parliament for Heytesbury; 1812–1818; With: Charles Duncombe	Succeeded by George James Welbore Agar-Ellis; William Henry John Scott
Peerage of Ireland
Preceded by Alexander Hood	Baron Bridport; 1814–1868	Succeeded by Alexander Nelson Hood
