= Dukedom of Bronte =

Italian noble title

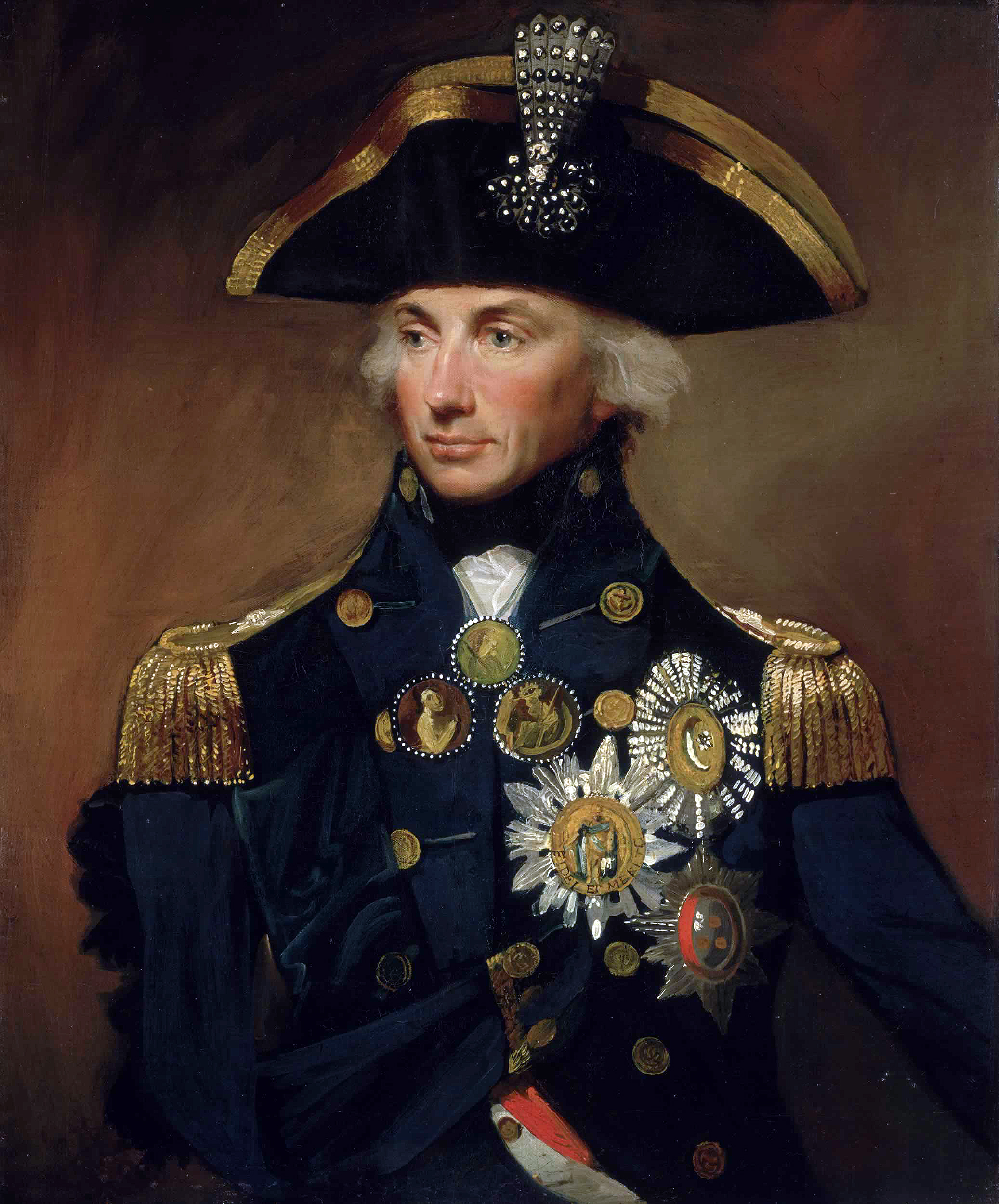
Horatio Nelson in a 1799 portrait by Lemuel Francis Abbott

The Dukedom of Bronte (Italian: Ducato/Ducea di Bronte ("Duchy of Bronte")) was a dukedom with the title Duke of Bronte (Italian: Duca di Bronte), referring to the town of Bronte in the province of Catania, Sicily. It was granted on 10 October 1799 at Palermo to the British Royal Navy officer Horatio Nelson by King Ferdinand III of Sicily, in gratitude for Nelson having saved the kingdom of Sicily from conquest by Revolutionary French forces under Napoleon. This was largely achieved by Nelson's victory at the Battle of the Nile (1798), which extinguished French naval power in the Mediterranean, but also by his having evacuated the royal family from their palace in Naples to the safety of Palermo in Sicily. It carried the right to sit in parliament within the military branch. The dukedom does not descend according to fixed rules but is transferable by the holder to whomsoever he or she desires, strangers included. Accompanying it was a grant of a 15,000 hectares (58 mi^{2}) estate, centered on the ancient monastery of Maniace, five miles north of Bronte, which Nelson ordered to be restored and embellished as his residence – thenceforth called Castello di Maniace. He appointed as his resident administrator (or governor) Johann Andreas Graeffer (d. 1802), an English-trained German landscape gardener who had recently created the English Garden at the Royal Palace of Caserta in Naples. Nelson never set foot on his estate, as he was killed in action six years later at the Battle of Trafalgar.

== Choice of title ==
Augmented English arms of Horatio Nelson, 1st Duke of Bronte: Or, a cross patonce sable surmounted by a bend gules thereon another bend engrailed of the field charged with three hand-grenades of the second fired proper a chief of augmentation wavy argent thereon waves of the sea from which issuant in the centre a palm tree between a disabled ship on the dexter and a battery in ruins on the sinister all proper

Arms of Hood, after being created Duke of Bronte

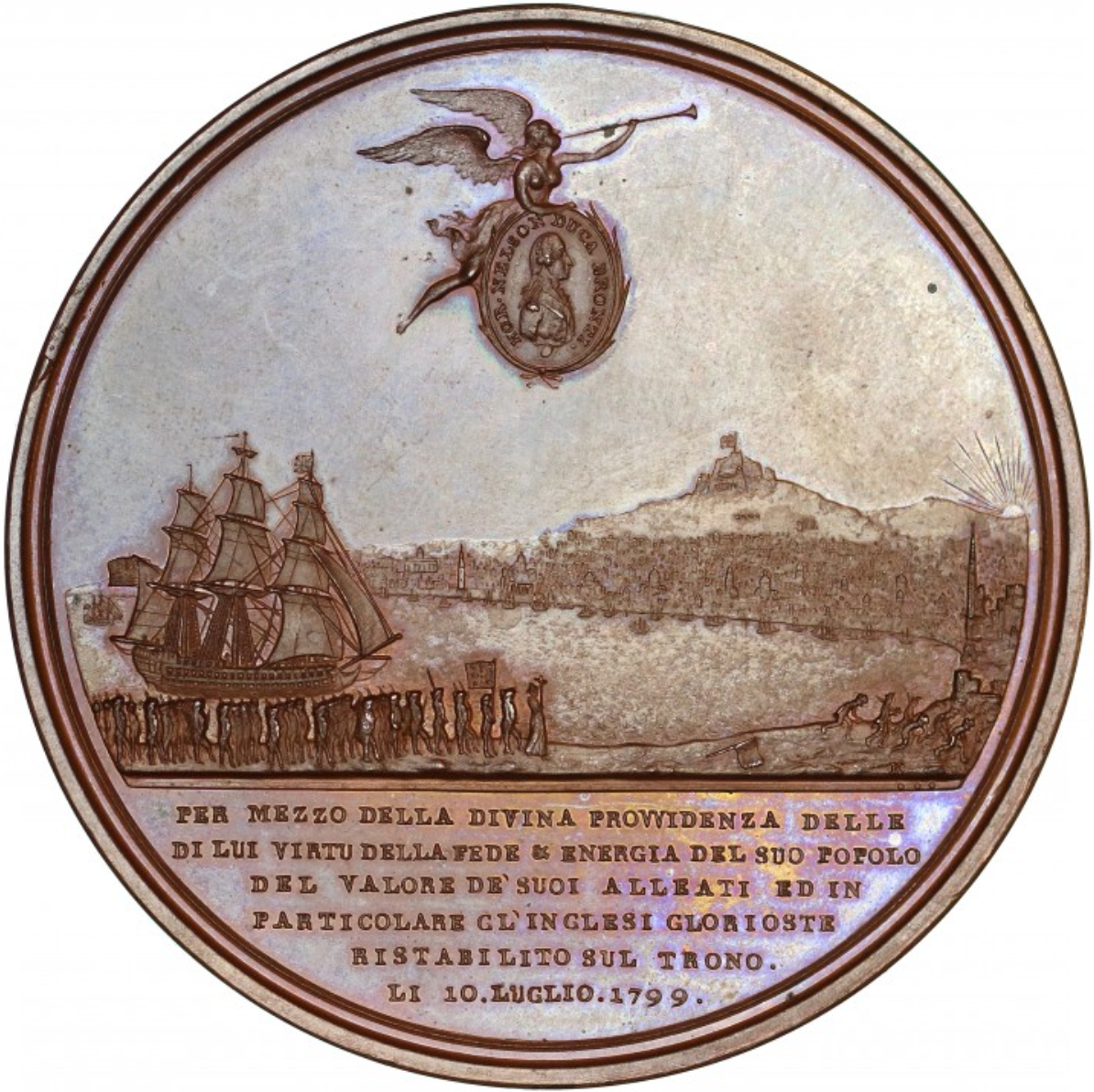
1799 medallion commemorating the Restoration of Ferdinand IV, King of Naples, showing above the goddess Fame holding an image of Nelson inscribed HOR. NELSON DUCA BRONTI (sic), above his flagship HMS Foudroyant in the Bay of Naples

The Admiral was offered by King Ferdinand a choice of one of three dukedoms with an accompanying estate – Bisacquino, Partinico or Bronte. The king wrote in a note to his minister: The estate of Bronte is the most suitable for the purpose, but the revenue is insufficient, and must be not less than 6,000 ounces, not more than 8,000, thus if there are other adjoining estates to make up the difference these must be annexed, giving the equivalent sums to the proprietors, and creating the feudal form and character with title of duke which in England sounds better than the others.

It is suggested that Nelson chose Bronte for several reasons, including the Greek origin of the name (meaning "thunder", an allusion to Mount Etna, the main crater of which is a mere 15 km to the east), the majesty of the volcano itself, the healthiness and fertility of the soil, the verses of the Palermo poet Giovanni Meli, and the ease of pronunciation of the word for an Englishman. But most likely because having lost an eye in battle in 1794, he was able to identify himself with the Cyclops (mythical giant one-eyed creatures, makers of the thunderbolts of Zeus, god of war, and assistants of the smith-god Hephaestus), whose forge was supposed to be underneath Mount Etna. He signed his will as "Nelson Bronte", and the initials "NB" appear on the wrought-iron entrance gates at Castello di Maniace (which are also the initials of his foe Napoleon Bonaparte).

== Ducal powers ==
The grant, of perpetual duration and comprising about 15,000 hectares (37,000 acres) of land, included extensive feudal rights, the same as had been held from the 15th century by the previous overlord, the Ospedale Grande e Nuovo in Palermo, including: "the City of Bronte" (population 9,500) "with all its tenures and districts, together with its fiefdoms, marches, fortifications, vassal citizens, revenues of the vassals, censuses, services, bondage and gabelles". The dukedom also included the power of mero et mixto imperio, the sole power of the exercise of justice, both civil and criminal, including capital punishment. The title later became part of the nobility of the Kingdom of the Two Sicilies.

== Local opposition ==
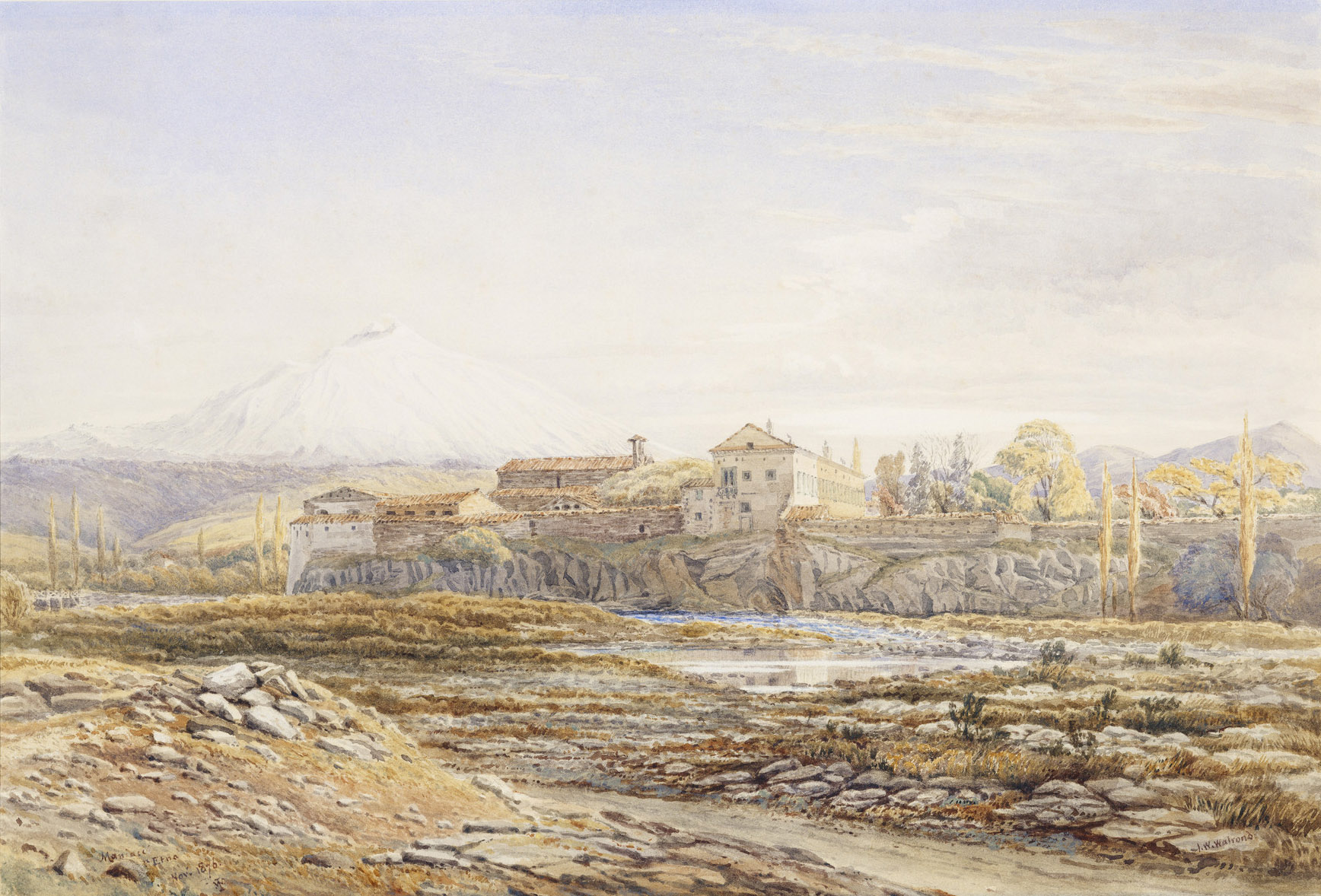
Castello di Maniace, caput of the Dukedom of Bronte, situated 5 miles north of the town of Bronte. Viewed from north across the dried up river bed of the River Saraceno, with Mount Etna in the background (the main crater of which is 15 km to the south-east). Painted in 1876 by Sir John Walrond, 1st Baronet (1818–1889), son-in-law of the 3rd Duchess of Bronte. Royal Collection

Floor plan of Castello di Maniace

Aside from having been granted by a king from the Spanish royal family considered foreign and abhorrent by many Sicilians, the new dukedom was not popular with a powerful faction of the local population who had felt oppressed for centuries by the feudal power of the Hospital of Palermo, the previous overlord of Bronte, from which they believed they had just recently obtained freedom, after finally winning a legal battle lasting many centuries. The king compensated the Hospital of Palermo (with an annuity of 71,500 lire) but ignored the free status claimed by the Brontese, who thus felt themselves subjected once again to a harsh feudal government, this time by a foreigner. Two parties thus arose in the local population, the ducale, supportive of the duchy, and the comunista, supportive of an independent Commune of Bronte. Many indeed were highly sympathetic to the ideals of the French Revolution, and felt that Nelson had "smothered with bloodshed the Neapolitan Republic" and confounded their dream to live in a new society where feudalism would be extinguished. The Brontese historian Benedetto Radice wrote in 1928: "Thus Bronte, due to the fairytale of its name, got the honour of a duchy and was confirmed in the misfortune of vaselage, just like a dog on which its master places around its neck a fine collar of silver or gold", and "The evils which afflict Bronte are twofold: Etna and the Duchy"

Much to the approval of his mistress Lady Hamilton (wife of the British Ambassador to Naples) and of the king, Nelson had executed Admiral Prince Francesco Caracciolo (1752–1799), hero of the Neapolitan revolution, by hanging him from the rigging of his ship after a summary trial. This act was never forgotten by this Brontese faction, which after 1940 when the Hood family had been expelled from Sicily during World War II, and their duchy confiscated by Mussolini, built with state assistance a model "peasants' village" in the park of Castello di Maniace, at a cost of over 4 million lire, which they called "Borgo Francesco Caracciolo". It was never completed due to the Allied landing in 1943, and in 1964 was razed to the ground by the 6th Duke after a special UK-Italy war damages commission in 1956 adjudged the Duke the legitimate owner of the duchy and of the Borgo.

Although the dukes brought considerable improvements to the area, including in irrigation and agriculture, this opposed faction never accepted the English presence at Bronte, and the protracted and costly legal dispute continued unabated until 1981 when the Hood family, ultimate heirs of Admiral Lord Nelson, sold the entire estate and the house with all its contents, excepting the small ducal cemetery, to the Council of Bronte. The former ducal residence is now a museum open to the public, known locally as Castello dei Nelson, "Castle of the Nelsons" [sic], containing memorabilia of the Admiral and portraits of the Hood family.

== Palazzo Ducale, Bronte ==
Until 1935, the dukes had a town house in Bronte, five miles south of the Castello, for use when on business in that town. Known as the Palazzo Ducale, it had 35 rooms with a walled garden to the rear, and was situated on Corso Umberto, the facade being opposite Piazza Cappuccini, site of the Cappuccine Convent, the rear being bounded by the via Madonna Riparo (now via Roma) and the via Nelson (now via A. Spedalieri). It was built by Bryant Barret (d.1818), one of the dukedom's land agents during the early period when the Castello was uninhabitable and the dukes were absentee landlords. Most has since been demolished but a few sections, including that of the main entrance, survive, namely the residence of the late Professor Paparo, the former Santangelo printing works, the houses Mineo, Parisi etc, as far as the former Cinema Roma. The large and imposing cellar today houses the Deluchiana municipal library. The 5th Duke considered it a white elephant and stayed there only once, namely on the first night of his first visit to the dukedom aged 14 in 1868.

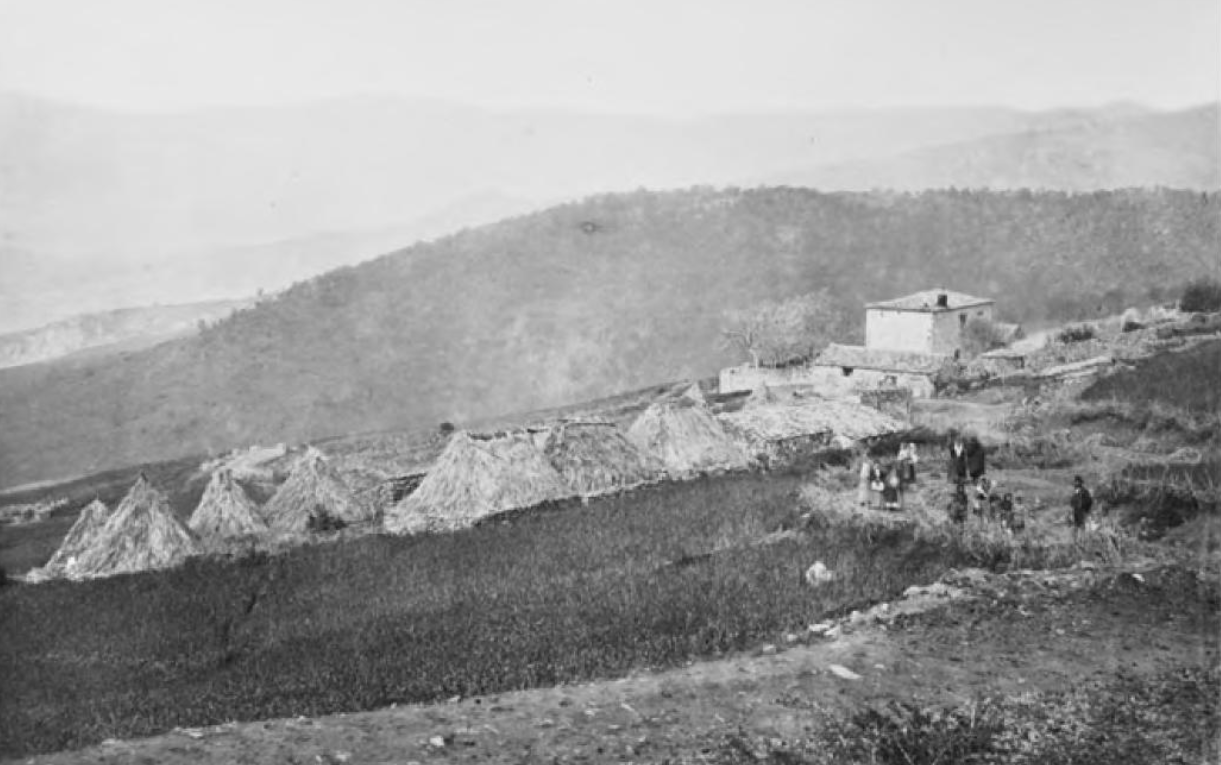
Casa Otaiti in 1885, summer residence of the land agent, surrounded by peasants' "wigwam"-like straw huts reminding the 5th Duke of Tahiti in the Pacific

There was also a small summer residence built by the estate's land agent William Thovez (1819–1871), now known as Casa Otaiti (so named because it was surrounded by "wigwams" of peasants' straw-thatched huts, reminding the 5th Duke of Tahiti in the Pacific), situated 3 1/2 km (2.2 mi) to the north-east of the Castello at higher altitude to escape malaria, on the way up to the Nebrodi Mountains and about half-way to the (later) Obelisco di Nelson. This was done on the order of the 2nd Duke, who was concerned about his health and had urged him to drain and canalize the swampy areas around the Castello.

== Descent ==
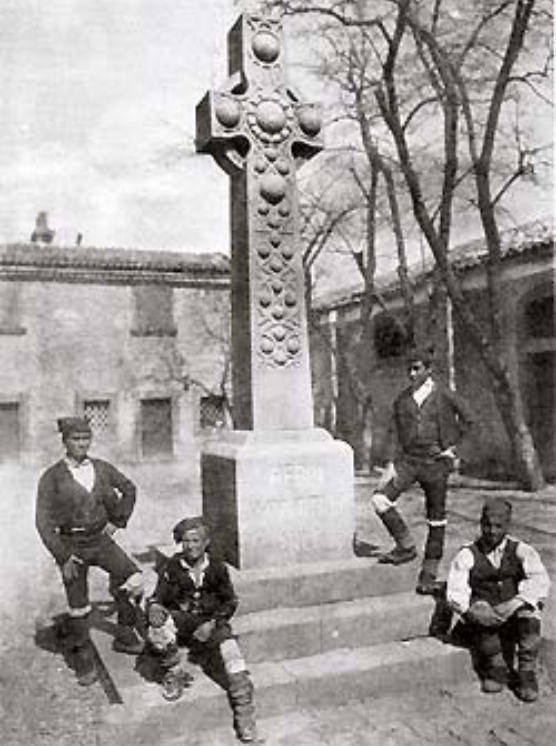
Celtic cross monument to Admiral Lord Nelson, with contadini (peasant farmers), Castello di Maniace, erected in 1891 by the 5th Duke, whose close friend and frequent visitor was the "Celtic" poet William Sharp (d.1905), buried in the ducal cemetery. Photo published 1903

=== Horatio Nelson, 1st Duke of Bronte, 1st Viscount Nelson (1758–1805) ===
Horatio Nelson, 1st Duke of Bronte, 1st Viscount Nelson (1758–1805) had obtained from the king the unusual right that the dukedom could be transferred "at the holder's pleasure, not only to his relatives but also to strangers". The 1st Duke never set foot on the estate, although having spent extensively on refurbishing the monastic buildings he was clearly planning to make it his home with his mistress Lady Hamilton, and had become much enamoured with the island of Sicily. Although the royal grant allowed him to do so, he did not specifically bequeath the duchy to his illegitimate daughter (by Lady Emma Hamilton), Horatia Nelson Thompson (whom he otherwise provided for in the will), possibly the intricacies having escaped his mind whilst writing his last will whilst mortally injured aboard HMS Victory.

=== William Nelson, 2nd Duke of Bronte, 1st Earl Nelson (1757–1835) ===
Thus the duchy passed to the Admiral's elder brother and heir William Nelson, 2nd Duke of Bronte, 1st Earl Nelson (1757–1835), who lived at Standlynch House in Wiltshire, and likewise never visited.

=== Charlotte Nelson, 3rd Duchess of Bronte (1787–1873) ===
The first to visit was the 1st Earl's daughter Charlotte Mary Nelson, 3rd Duchess of Bronte (1787–1873) (who lived with her husband Samuel Hood, 2nd Baron Bridport at Cricket St Thomas in Somerset) who visited once very briefly in 1830s or 1840s but was appalled by the primitive state of the countryside and the entire absence of roads, which necessitated her travelling from Bronte to Maniace by mule litter. During the politically unsettled time of the Risorgimento and following the 1860 uprising in Bronte (Fatti di Bronte) by the Communista faction, which resulted in the slaughter of 16 supporters of the ducal party, including the duchy's notary and his son, the Duchess in 1861, in an effort to calm the situation, ceded about half of the 15,000 hectares (58 mi^{2}) estate to the Commune of Bronte.

=== Alexander Nelson Hood, 4th Duke of Bronte, 1st Viscount Bridport (1814–1904) ===
The 3rd Duchess's son Alexander Nelson Hood, 4th Duke of Bronte, 1st Viscount Bridport (1814–1904) visited twice, during his mother's lifetime, in 1864 and 1868, accompanied by his wife and some of his children.

=== Sir Alexander Nelson Hood, 5th Duke of Bronte (1854–1937) ===
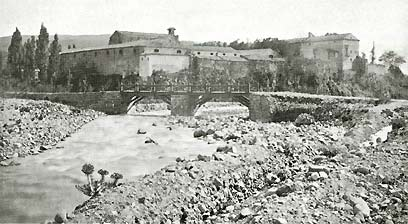
Castello di Maniace in 1885, showing the old bridge over the River Saraceno, built by one of the dukes, on which tolls were levied from crossing traffic

The 4th Duke bequeathed the duchy to his 4th son Sir Alexander Nelson Hood, 5th Duke of Bronte (1854–1937) ("Alec"), who had been 14 on the 1868 visit. He was sent by his father to Maniace in 1873 aged 19 to manage the estate, being known there during his father's lifetime as the Duchino ("little duke"). On his father's death he was bequeathed the dukedom, becoming the 5th Duke. "Discreetly homosexual" and a "great admirer of Mussolini and the Fascist regime", he was well-respected and liked by the inhabitants, and spent six months of each year resident in Maniace until his old age. He was thus the first of his family to make the Castello di Maniace his home. He built himself a palatial villa named La Falconara—sometimes referred to today by estate agents for marketing purposes as Villa Nelson, and claimed (erroneously) by them to have been built by the Admiral in 1780—at Taormina on the coast, 40 km to the east on the other side of Etna, already well-populated with fellow British expatriates and visitors, and with his close friend and frequent guest the writer Robert Hichens he helped to establish Taormina as a "holiday resort for wealthy homosexuals from Northern Europe". His English career was as a courtier to King George V, whom he entertained at La Falconara in April 1925. He died unmarried, and was ultimately buried at Maniace in the ducal cemetery, created by him.

=== Rowland Nelson Hood, 6th Duke of Bronte, 3rd Viscount Bridport (1911–1969) ===
- Rowland Arthur Herbert Nelson Hood, 6th Duke of Bronte, 3rd Viscount Bridport (1911–1969) was the great-nephew and heir of the 5th Duke, and he also made Maniace his home, the family's English seat at Cricket St Thomas in Somerset having been sold in 1889 by his grandfather the 1st Viscount. In 1940 as an enemy alien he was expelled from Italy by Mussolini and the duchy (recorded as 6,540 hectares (25 1/4 mi^{2}) was confiscated, the lands being allotted to the local peasantry. The estate was recovered after the 1943 landings by the Allies in Sicily. The long-standing unrest of the comunista faction continued and by 1956, although his own tenants and peasantry still insisted (to his embarrassment) on kissing his hand in the traditional manner, he was not so beloved by the "comunista" faction of the townsfolk and was employing armed guards around his estate, to counter for example the 1,500 strong demonstration of red-flag bearing townsfolk who attempted to march into the estate in that year, blocked by a chain across the road and the police. Violent civil unrest had been seen before in Bronte between the two parties, most notably during the Risorgimento in the 1860 massacre (I Fatti di Bronte) (the Dukes being then non-resident) when 16 of the ducal faction had been killed during rioting and looting, including the 3rd Duchess's notary Ignazio Cannata and his son, executed by the mob. It was the subject of a 1972 film by Florestano Vancini, Bronte: cronaca di un massacro che i libri di storia non hanno raccontato ("Bronte – chronicle of a massacre which the history books have not recounted"). During the 1960s agrarian reform, disputes and expropriations resulted in most of the estate, namely 6,593 hectares (16,290 acres), being allocated piecemeal to the resident tenants, leaving a ducal demesne of 240 hectares (0.93 mi^{2}) He died in 1969 and was buried in the ducal cemetery.

=== Alexander Nelson Hood, 7th Duke of Bronte, 4th Viscount Bridport (b. 1948) ===
Alexander Nelson Hood, 7th Duke of Bronte, 4th Viscount Bridport (b. 1948), son of the 6th Duke, who having been brought up at Maniace inherited the dukedom aged 21 on his father's death in 1969. The estate had by then dwindled to 240 hectares (590 acres), mainly fruit orchards. Educated at Eton and the Sorbonne he had already embarked on a promising career at Kleinwort Benson merchant bank in the City of London, where he had been offered a job by his godfather David Robertson, one of the directors. "He struggled with the property for 10 years before deciding it could never pay for itself" and decided to sell. Although by then very successful and the youngest senior manager at the firm, he "realized that he would have to leave Kleinwort and go to live in Sicily until the sale was completed", and obtained employment in a bank in Rome. In 1976 he first advertised the estate for sale by tender (i.e. to the highest bidder, without specifying a price), and in 1980 sold the agricultural land to a business based in Catania for 3 billion lire (£1.3 million). On 4 September 1981 he sold the remaining parkland and the Castello for further proceeds of 1.75 billion lire (about £800,000). The sum was allocated as follows: 1,187 for real estate (950 for castle and grounds, 237 for other buildings) and 570 for the furniture, relics, pictures and other chattels. It was then considered "the last fiefdom in Sicily", and the purchaser was the Commune of Bronte, for whom the centuries-old struggle against its perceived "feudal masters" was thus brought to an end. 90% was financed by the Assessorato ai Beni Culturali della Regione Siciliana. The website "bronte insieme" (bronte together), established in 2001 by several prominent citizens states: "Today the "hated" English Dukedom of the "boia di Caracciolo" (executioner of Caracciolo) became property of the brontese citizens". He retained as a proprietor only the small ducal cemetery next to the Castello, where his father was buried, and which "landholding qualification", no matter how tiny and symbolic, preserves to some extent his legal and moral right to the feudal title (i.e. one dependent on land ownership) of "Duke of Bronte", as certainly the letters patent granted by the king in 1799 were interpreted by the 5th Duke to have a feudal nature, signifying (in his words) that "the proprietors of this land would have the title of 'Duke of Bronte', in consequence all the proprietors of the duchy would become ipso facto Dukes of Bronte". The title, as with all ancient Italian titles of nobility (excepting Papal titles), has no legal status in republican Italy, and the issue has not been challenged in any court of law or heraldry. He has never returned and commented many years later in 1999: "I will go back one day, but it was a painful experience to sell somewhere you've been brought up and loved, but it was just hopeless". Having moved on successively to senior roles in Chase Manhattan and Shearson Lehman Brothers, in 1992 he established his own asset management business, "Bridport Investment Services", with offices in Geneva and London. He has twice been married and twice divorced, with a son from each marriage. In November 2003 he agreed to lease the ducal cemetery to the Comune di Maniace for a period of 10 years, for the promotion of tourism, and for the signing ceremony a delegation from Bronte comprising Emilio Conti (the mayor (sindaco)) and Riccardo Bontempo Scavo (the cultural assessor (l'Assessore alla Cultura)), travelled to the Italian Consulate in Geneva, where the 7th Duke was presented with a relief portrait of Admiral Lord Nelson sculpted on a sandstone tablet by the artist Maria Concetta Lazzaro.

=== Commune of Bronte ===
In the first few years of the tenure of Commune of Bronte "the buildings and gardens fell into disrepair", but were restored before 2013. Ironically, having finally won their centuries-old struggle to recover the ancient estate, the Commune of Bronte promptly changed the name of the house to Castello dei Nelson ("House of the Nelsons"), and as the Duchy historian Lucy Riall remarked at the close of her epilogue (2013): Not everyone, it seems, shares the present Duke of Bronte's desire to move on. In January 1984 there occurred a major robbery in which about 20 important items of furniture, paintings (including Victory with Admiral Hood near Bastia by Lieutenant William Elliott) and Nelson memorabilia were stolen from the Castello, which remain unrecovered. To the consternation of many locals still harbouring the old anti-ducal outlook, the town of Bronte was recently twinned with the Norfolk village of Burnham Thorpe, birthplace of Admiral Nelson. In 2016 the Commune of Bronte entered into a contract for restoration of the Castello for the sum of 1.213 million Euros. Today, this historic site has become a museum open to the public. The average annual number of visitors has been in excess of 30,000.

== List of dukes ==
See also Viscount Nelson, Earl Nelson, Viscount Bridport

The holders of this title have been:

- Horatio Nelson, 1st Duke of Bronte, 1st Viscount Nelson (1758–1805)
- William Nelson, 2nd Duke of Bronte, 1st Earl Nelson (1757–1835) (elder brother)
- Charlotte Mary Nelson, 3rd Duchess of Bronte (1787–1873) (daughter)
- Alexander Nelson Hood, 4th Duke of Bronte, 1st Viscount Bridport (1814–1904) (son) (previously created Viscount Bridport; see above)
- Sir Alexander Nelson Hood, 5th Duke of Bronte (1904–1937) "Alec" (younger son, by bequest)
- Rowland Arthur Herbert Nelson Hood, 6th Duke of Bronte, 3rd Viscount Bridport (1911–1969) (great-nephew)
- Alexander Nelson Hood, 7th Duke of Bronte, 4th Viscount Bridport (b. 1948) (son)

The heir apparent is the present holder's son, the Hon. Peregrine Alexander Nelson Hood (b. 1974). The heir apparent's heir presumptive is his eldest daughter, Honor Linda Nelson Hood (b. 2016).

== Family tree ==
Family tree of the Earls Nelson

Baron Hood of Catherington in the County of Southampton (Ireland), 1782; Viscount Hood of Whitley in the County of Warwick (UK, 1st creation), 1796 | Baron Bridport (Ireland), 1794; Viscount Bridport (UK, 1st creation), 1800
Edmund Nelson (1722–1802) | Samuel Hood (1724–1816); 1st Viscount Hood | Alexander Hood (1726–1814); 1st Baron Bridport, 1st Viscount Bridport
Viscounty Bridport (1st creation) extinct, 1814
Earl Nelson (UK), of Trafalgar and of Merton in the County of Surrey and Viscount Merton (UK), of Trafalgar and of Merton in the County of Surrey, 1805 | Baron Nelson (GB), of the Nile, and of Burnham Thorpe in the County of Norfolk (1st creation), 1798; Duke of Bronte (Italy), 1799; Viscount Nelson (UK), of the Nile, and of Burnham Thorpe in the County of Norfolk, 1801; Baron Nelson (UK), of the Nile, and of Hillborough in the County of Norfolk, 1801
Susannah Nelson (1755–1813) | William Nelson (1757–1835); 2nd Duke of Bronte, 1st Earl Nelson, 1st Viscount Merton, 2nd Baron Nelson of the Nile and of Hillborough | Horatio Nelson (1758–1805); 1st Duke of Bronte, Viscount Nelson, Baron Nelson of the Nile and of Burnham Thorpe, 1st Baron Nelson of the Nile and of Hillborough | Henry Hood (1753–1836); 2nd Viscount Hood
Barony Nelson of the Nile and of Hillborough extinct, 1835 | Viscounty Nelson and Barony Nelson of the Nile and of Burnham Thorpe (1798) extinct, 1805
Thomas Bolton, later Nelson (1786–1835); 2nd Earl Nelson, 2nd Viscount Merton | Charlotte Hood (1787–1873); 3rd Duchess of Bronte | Samuel Hood (1788–1868); 2nd Baron Bridport
Viscount Bridport (UK, 2nd creation), 1868
Horatio Nelson (1823–1913); 3rd Earl Nelson, 3rd Viscount Merton | Alexander Nelson Hood (1814–1904); 4th Duke of Bronte, 1st Viscount Bridport, 3rd Baron Bridport
Thomas Horatio Nelson (1857–1947); 4th Earl Nelson, 4th Viscount Merton | Edward Agar Horatio Nelson (1860–1951); 5th Earl Nelson, 5th Viscount Merton | Arthur Wellington Alexander Nelson Hood (1839–1924); 2nd Viscount Bridport, 4th Baron Bridport | Alexander Hood (1854–1937); 5th Duke of Bronte
Maurice Henry Nelson Hood (1881–1915)
Albert Francis Joseph Horatio Nelson (1890–1957); 6th Earl Nelson, 6th Viscount Merton | Henry Edward Joseph Horatio Nelson (1894–1972); 7th Earl Nelson, 7th Viscount Merton | George Joseph Horatio Nelson (1905–1981); 8th Earl Nelson, 8th Viscount Merton | John Marie Joseph Horatio Nelson (1908–1970) | Rowland Arthur Herbert Nelson Hood (1911–1969); 6th Duke of Bronte, 3rd Viscount Bridport
Peter John Horatio Nelson (1941–2009); 9th Earl Nelson, 9th Viscount Merton | Alexander Nelson Hood (b. 1948); 7th Duke of Bronte, 4th Viscount Bridport
Simon John Horatio Nelson (b. 1971); 10th Earl Nelson, 10th Viscount Merton | Peregrine Alexander Nelson Hood (b. 1974); Heir apparent to the Dukedom of Bronte and Viscounty Bridport
Thomas John Horatio Nelson (b. 2010) styled Viscount Merton

== List of governors ==
The governors (procurators, land agents or administrators) (procuratori dei duchi/governatori/agenti generali) of the estate wielded great local power, especially before the time of the 5th Duke (1873), whose predecessors had all been non-resident and had rarely, if ever, visited the estate. Some played important roles during the political disturbances at Bronte during the Risorgimento. When the 5th Duke took up residency in 1873 he found an administrator in situ who was reluctant to give up his power and future plans for the estate, whom he promptly fired. The Governors were as follows:

- 1799–1802: Johann Andreas Graeffer (d.1802), appointed by Admiral Nelson, 1st Duke. An English-trained German landscape gardener who had recently created the English Garden at the Royal Palace of Caserta in Naples for Nelson's benefactor the King of Sicily. He reconstructed the dilapidated monastic buildings at Maniace to create a suitable residence for the new Duke, and created an English garden. He was buried without monument in the Monastic Church of St Mary, within the Castello. On 2 June 1800 Nelson wrote from Palermo to Sir John Acton, Prime Minister of the King of Sicily: "My object at Bronte is to make the people happy by not suffering them to be oppressed, to enrich the country by the improvement in agriculture, for these reasons I selected Mr Graffner as a proper person for Governor as his character for honesty is unimpeachable ... and yet it would appear there are persons who wish for certain reasons to lessen the king's most magnificent gift to me and also to make the inhabitants of that country more miserable than they were before the estate came into my possession".
  - Abraham Gibbs (1758–1816). Graeffer was assisted by the Admiral's Devon-born friend Abraham Gibbs (1758–1816), a Palermo-based British banker of Gibbs & Co Bank, banker to the Court of the Two Sicilies at Naples, Consul at Palermo for the U.S.A. and Paymaster to the British Forces in the Mediterranean. He committed suicide in 1816 and his firm was liquidated by his nephew and partner William H. Gibbs.
- 1802–1816: Marchese (Marquis) Antonio Forcella (1740–1828), recommended to Gibbs by Sir John Acton (Prime Minister of the King of Sicily) as a replacement for the deceased Graeffer. Forcella was a nobleman at the royal court of Palermo, created a marquis in 1815, a son of the Barone di Castel Forcella (a district of Naples), himself the son of a notary at Buccino near Naples, of obscure origin. He was assisted by Mr Gibbs. The 2nd Duke "frequently lamented at the manner in which his affairs were cared for by these two men". Forcella's local representative was Mrs Elisa Graeffer, widow of the first agent. The 2nd Duke remarked "Mrs. Grafer's death removes a very troublesome person". The 2nd Duke ordered Barret to fire her son-in-law Gioacchino Spedalieri, Secretary to the Duchy, and son of Don Nicolò Spedalieri, nominated in 1803 Mayor (sindaco) of Bronte by Marchese Forcella.
- 1817–1818: (Joseph) Bryant Barrett (1773–1818), who "seemed to have been well-intentioned with many ideas and projects for the improvement of the estate", but died suddenly after one year of service, succeeded briefly by his widow Martha. He was the second son of Bryant Barrett (1714–90), the son of a London wax chandler and a Roman Catholic, who became lacemaker to King George III and purchased Milton Manor near Abingdon in Berkshire, where he built a new house designed by Inigo Jones. (Joseph) Bryant Barrett was probably a solicitor at Gray's Inn, possibly in partnership with his younger brother James William Barrett (1776–1864), the first Roman Catholic to have been be admitted a solicitor following the relaxation of the penal laws. On 18 September 1804 at the fashionable St George's Church, Hanover Square in London, he married Martha Spence, a daughter of Thomas Richard Spence, by whom he had two daughters.
- 1818–1819: Mrs. Martha Barrett, divided the local population.
- 1819–1839: Phillip Thovez (d.1840), a Commissioner of the Royal Navy (as is stated on his monument), who remained for 20 years until his death, nominated by the 2nd Duke and the 3rd Duchess. Philip Thovez, aged 20, "Italian", was a midshipman on HMS Victory, at the Battle of Trafalgar in 1805. Buried in the Monastic Church of St Mary, within the Castello, where survives his elaborate monument erected by his son and successor William.
- 1839–1872: William Thovez ("son" of William Thovez) incontrastato padrone ("undisputed boss"), who effectively ruled the duchy for 33 years and due to his office was "one of the most powerful and wealthy men in the whole Province of Catania" and was the head of the ducal faction during politically turbulent times, most notably during the uprisings of 1848 and 1860. He features in the 1972 film by Vancini, meeting with General Nino Bixio, sent by Garibaldi to quell the 1860 uprising and massacre. He married twice, firstly to Rosaria Fragalà (1808–1856) whose elaborate monument survives in the Monastic Church of St Mary, within the Castello, and secondly he married (in the 5th Duke's words) "An unpleasant English woman, governess of his daughter, who played her role in the origin of the big disagreement". His daughter Clorinda married the lawyer Mariano Fiorini, in 1860 Commander of the Guardia Nazionale at Maletto, later mayor (sindaco) of that town. Fired by the 5th Duke ("My family for too long allowed him autonomous decision-making and in the end he considered himself a true boss, not supporting outside interference ... he showed himself reluctant to conform to the wishes of my father concerning the management of the estate and was fired with a pension"). He refused to hand over the duchy accounts to his successor. Died in 1879 and was buried in the Protestant Cemetery in Messina.
- 1872–1874: Samuel Grisley (1808–1874), who many years prior as a young man from the Royal Naval College, Greenwich, had started work in the duchy during the time of Phillip Thovez (d.1840), and had subsequently worked "with true devotion" as a factor. In his memory the 4th Duke erected a tablet in the Monastic Church of St Mary, within the Castello, inscribed: Per 54 anni impiegato fedele della Ducea di Bronte .... il Visconte Bridport Duca di Bronte a segno imperituro di gratitudine di stima addolorato questa pietra poneva ("for 54 years a faithful employee ... Viscount Bridport, Duke of Bronte, as an eternal mark of gratitude and esteem, in grief placed this stone")
- 1872–?: Il Ducino (future 5th Duke), who at the age of 19 had been sent out the previous year, thenceforth took full and sole control of the estate as resident administrator for several years. He remarked: "My task: to administer a large territory, young as I was, devoid of experience, ignorant of people and of their ways, with an uncertain knowledge of the language, was not of the simplest. However I pledged entirely and by working sometimes till one in the morning or later, I kept the accounts, supervised the outdoor labour, took care of the correspondence and the administration, for a fair few years, practically without help". Eventually he hired to assist him Monsieur Louis Fabre "whose collaboration was worthy of note".
  - ?-1908: Monsieur Louis Fabre, who served for 34 years, but was ultimately fired.
  - 1908–1917: Cavaliere Charles Beek, formerly the assistant to Louis Fabre. The 5th Duke remarked: "He had my gratitude and total trust right until his lamented death" and called him: "Our devoted friend who gave the benefit of his advice and assistance". He was a son of Col. William George Beek (1804–1873), the explorer in the Middle East, especially of the Dead Sea, who spent time in Sicily as a manager in mining. Being unmarried he got bored and lonely, as his correspondence records, and he considered the locals as "a silent underhand mafia which pretend(s) to obey orders but always manage(s) to mis-understand or not to do as they are told". He thought the castle cook was deliberately spoiling his meals and emigration of the locals was making it hard to find labour. Following the 1908 Messina earthquake which killed over 100,000 people, he did much to help destitute survivors, for which he was made a cavaliere (knight). Beek died at Maniace of malaria in 1917 and was buried in the ducal cemetery, leaving no children.
  - 1917–1922: Edwin Hughes, buried in the ducal cemetery. Former assistant to Beek, but in the opinion of the 5th Duke "his bad health prevented him from providing an adequate service".
  - 1922–? Hon. Victor Albert Nelson Hood (1862–1929), younger brother of the 5th Duke, who having lived for 25 years in Australia where he served in high government office, moved to Maniace to assist his brother, himself assisted by Major Richard Forsyth Gray as "ADC". Buried at Maniace.
  - ?-1928: Major (Richard) Forsyth Gray, buried in the Ducal Cemetery.
  - 1928–1938: George Dubois Woods
  - 1938–1940: George Niblett, promoted on the death of Woods.
- 1940: Dr. Antonino Baiardi, a lawyer appointed by the wartime Italian authorities to oversee enemy property.
- 1940–1943: Dr. Giulio Leone, another Italian lawyer, on behalf of the Ente di Colonizzazione del Latifondo Siciliano.
- 1943–1945: Cav. (Sir) Luigi Modica (Allied Military Government)
  - 1945–1960: Charles Lawrence Hughes, formerly forestry manager in 1938 under George Woods.
- 1960–1981: Frank Edward King MBE (1922–2003), known as "Mr Frank", the last ducal administrator, who on 4 September 1981 confirmed the sale of the Castello and its park to the Commune of Bronte, excluding the Monastic Church which had earlier become state property. A soldier who had landed and fought in Sicily in 1943 during the Allied Invasion, he "fell in love with Sicily on first sight" and 3 years later married a local girl. In his obituary in La Sicilia newspaper, he was praised as an Inglese-Siculo ("Anglo-Sicilian") who had returned the Castello and park to their ancient splendour. "The barren lands of the Duchy he transformed into luxuriant orchards amongst the most admired, becoming a cultural treasure of Sicily and of the Sicilians". He restored the ancient monastic church and "for almost a half-century became the reference-point for the Embassy, the Anglican Church, a protagonist for humanitarian intervention, a gentleman known and appreciated in Italy, Europe and Overseas". In 1992 (?) he was created by the Queen an MBE for his professional and religious merits.

== Sources ==
- Website of Associazione Bronte Insieme ONLUS (www.bronteinsieme.it), founded 2001 by Franco Cimbali, Salvatore Di Bella, Giuliana Russo & Nino Liuzzo
- Benedetto Radice, Memorie storiche di Bronte (Historical memories of Bronte), Vols 1&2, Bronte 1928, 1936; background see digital text see
- Benedetto Radice, Il casale e l'abbazia di S. M. di Maniace, Palermo, 1909 Bronte Insieme/Personalities – Benedetto Radice
- Riall, Lucy (2013). Under the Volcano: Revolution in a Sicilian Town. Oxford University Press. ISBN 978-0-19-964649-4.
