= Alexander Hood, 5th Duke of Bronte =

British courtier and Sicilian nobleman

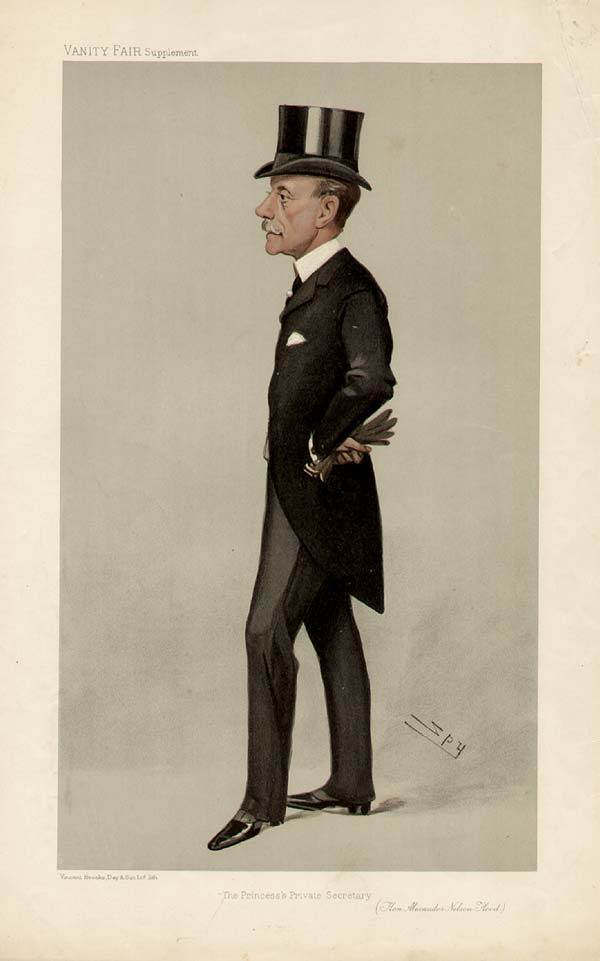
"The Princess's Private Secretary", caricature of Sir Alexander Nelson Hood, 5th Duke of Bronte, by "Spy", Vanity Fair magazine, 1905.

Arms of the Viscount Bridport: 1st and 4th, Azure a fret Argent on a Chief Or three Crescents Sable (Hood); 2nd and 3rd, Or a Cross patonce Sable a Bend Gules surmounted of another engrailed of the field charged with three Bombs fired proper on a Chief undulated Argent waves of the Sea from which a Palm Tree issuant between a Disabled Ship on the dexter and a Battery in Ruins on the sinister all proper over all a Fess wavy Azure thereon inscribed the word "Trafalgar" Or (Nelson)

Sir Alexander Nelson Hood, 5th Duke of Bronte, KCVO, OCI (28 June 1854 – 1 June 1937), of Castello di Maniace, Bronte, and La Falconara (now "Villa Nelson"), Taormina, both in Sicily, and of 13 Pelham Crescent, South Kensington, London, was a British courtier and Sicilian nobleman. "Discreetly homosexual" and described by his Sicilian biographer as "intelligent and refined", he was well-respected and liked by the Brontese, and spent six months of each year resident at Maniace until his old age. He was, like many contemporaries in his pre-World War II aristocratic circle, a "great admirer of Mussolini and the Fascist regime".

== Origins ==
He was the 4th son of Alexander Hood, 1st Viscount Bridport, by his wife Lady Mary Penelope Hill, a daughter of Arthur Hill, 3rd Marquess of Downshire.

== Duchy of Bronte ==
Whilst Alexander's eldest brother Arthur succeeded their father by law as Viscount Bridport, a title in the Peerage of the United Kingdom, the Duchy of Bronte, an ancient title in the Peerage of the (defunct) Kingdom of Sicily and Naples, was bequeathed to him by their father and thus he became the 5th Duke of Bronte. This was possible because of a special remainder in the letters patent granting the duchy (issued in 1799 by King King Ferdinand III of Sicily), which allowed the holder to choose as successor whomsoever he wished.

The Dukedom of Bronte with its vast estate (about 15,000 hectares and feudal rights over the City of Bronte, population about 9,000) had been granted in 1799 to Admiral Horatio Nelson by King Ferdinand III of Sicily, for services rendered in saving his kingdom from Revolutionary French invasion. The Duchy had been inherited by the Hood family by the marriage of Alexander's grandparents Samuel Hood, 2nd Baron Bridport (1788–1868) and Lady Charlotte Mary Nelson (d. 1873), suo jure 3rd Duchess of Bronte, niece and eventual heiress of Admiral Nelson.

In his book The Duchy of Bronte (1924) he speaks of his father's great generosity in entrusting him with his Sicilian estate, and his constant reply when asked for advice: "I leave it to you, I know you'll do your best". He first visited Bronte in Autumn 1868, aged 14, with his father, mother and sister Adelaide, only the third time Bronte had been visited by a family member since the creation of the Duchy (Admiral Nelson never set foot in it). He stayed his only night in the Palazzo Ducale, the family's townhouse in the town of Bronte, before moving on 5 1/2 miles north, accompanied by a long mule train (roads being non-existent), to the Castello di Maniace (or Castello Bronte / Castello dei Nelson), the seat of the duchy. His first impressions were "extremely favourable", and he was sad at the prospect of returning to England at the end of the four week visit. In 1873, aged 19, he was sent to Maniace (with Jane Thomson, the governess of his brother and sister, who stayed for 20 years) by his father to take full control of the estate, where during his father's lifetime he was known as the Duchino ("little duke"). He was the first resident Duke and made great improvements to the estate.

=== La Falconara, Taormina ===
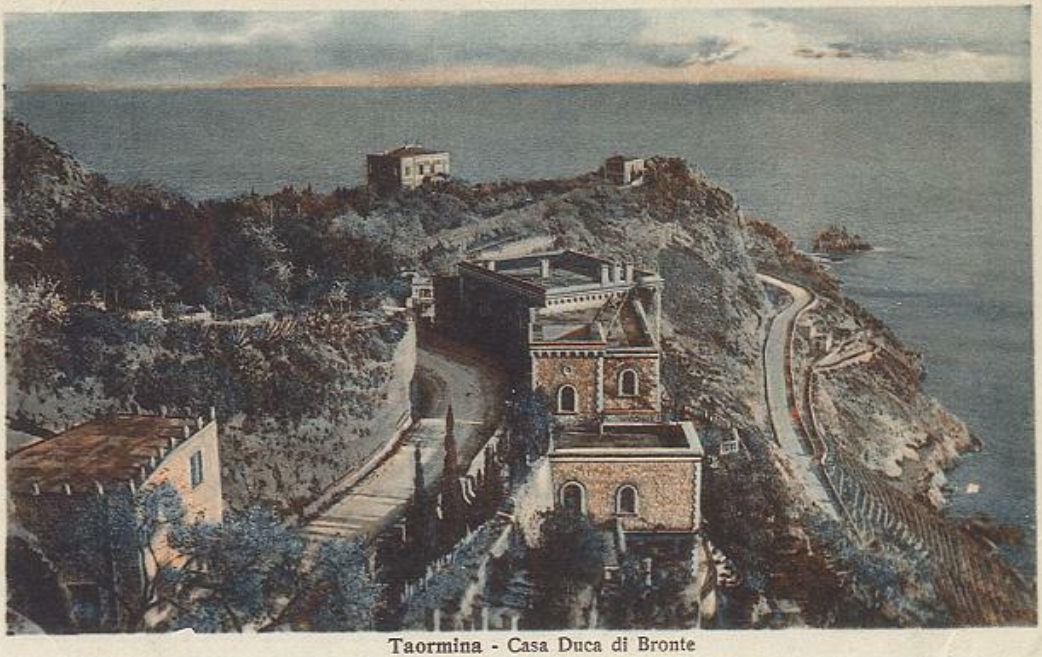
La Falconara, Taormina, built c. 1908-11 by the 5th Duke, where he entertained the British royal family in April 1925

In 1867, his grandmother Charlotte Hood, 3rd Duchess of Bronte, had purchased land at Taormina, on the coast 40 miles east of Maniace, in the Contrada Sant Leo. In 1903 he purchased additional land in Taormina, on which he built a large villa called "La Falconara" (aliter "Villa Nelson"), still under construction at the time of the 1908 Messina earthquake. The entrepreneur Maricchiolo laid the first stone. Situated at 99 Via Luigi Pirandello, on the steep hillside 400 yards below (south of) the Teatro Greco, it comprises 20 rooms, including 8 bedrooms, 10 bathrooms and 50,000 square metres (c. 12 acres) of gardens and greenery. With his close friend and frequent guest the writer Robert Hichens he helped to further establish Taormina (like Capri) as a "holiday resort for wealthy homosexuals from Northern Europe". That reputation had been initiated by the German photographer Wilhelm von Gloeden (1856–1931), who first visited Taormina in the 1870s, where he subsequently lived and died, together with other British expatriates such as the artist Robert Hawthorn Kitson (1873–1947) and Colonel Thomas Shaw-Hellier (1836–1910).

In April 1925 the 5th Duke entertained the British royal family at La Falconara, as is memorialised by a white marble tablet on a garden wall inscribed: "Their Majesties King George V and Queen Mary with TRH Prince George and Princess Victoria honoured this house and garden with a visit on 4th April 1925". An adjoining tablet records the visit 50 years later by Princess Margaret, in August 1975. The villa was sold by his descendants on 27 April 1948 to Gaetano Marzotto, Count Marzotto (d. 1972), of Valdagno near Venice, one of Italy's leading textile manufacturers (see Marzotto Group) and wine-makers, founder of the Jolly Hotels chain and father of the racing driver Gianni Marzotto. Its name was then changed to Villa Marzotto, until its sale in 1973. It was offered for sale in 2020 for 15 million Euros, fully furnished with antique contents which by law must be kept intact.

He was made a Grand Officer of the Order of the Crown of Italy.

== Erects monuments ==
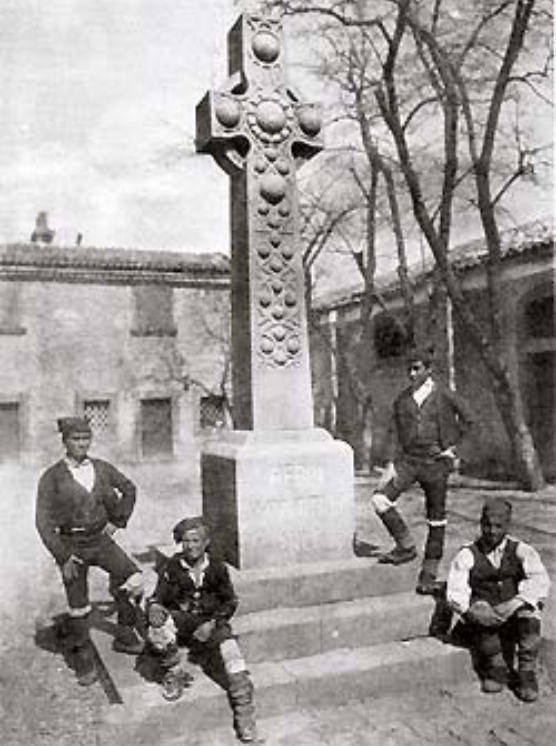
Celtic cross monument to Admiral Lord Nelson, Castello di Maniace, Bronte, with duchy contadini (peasant farmers). Erected in 1891, photo published 1903.

=== Celtic cross ===
In the inner courtyard at Castello di Maniace he erected in 1891 a large Ionian or Celtic cross, made to his own design of local black lava from Mount Etna and sculpted locally, in memory of Admiral Lord Nelson and inscribed on the base Heroi Immortali Nili ("To the immortal hero of the Nile"), the Battle of the Nile having particular significance in the saving of the Kingdom of Sicily and Naples from Napoleonic conquest. This resulted from a complaint by his aunt Jane Sarah Hood (Lady Hotham) when visiting with his father in 1888, that no monument existed, to which the Duke replied in jest that Wren's epitaph in St Paul's Cathedral states Si monumentum requiris circumspice ("if you seek his monument look around you"). Lady Hotham promptly sent him the requisite funds, with which he erected the monument. He erected another Celtic cross in the ducal cemetery at Maniace, on the grave of his close friend and frequent visitor the "Celtic" poet William Sharp (d. 1905), who died at Maniace, author of Through Nelson's Duchy (1903).

=== Obelisk ===
In 1905 in memory of his late father he erected a 40 foot high stone obelisk on Serra Mergo, at about 5,000 feet above sea level, the highest point of Serra Spina in the Nebrodi Mountains. Known locally as the Obelisco di Nelson (sic), it is situated 7.26 km due north of Castello di Maniace, close to the northern edge of the estate. It is today in a poor state of repair and verging on dilapidation. On the base is a white marble stone tablet he inscribed in Latin as follows (today much worn away by weather):

Memoriae perenni Alexandri Nelson IV. Dux Brontis, Vìcecomitis Bridport, qui in haec amoena rura quae emerito hoereditate acceperuit praeclaro parente Heroe Immortali Nili humanitatis et progressus cultum invexit. Natus fuit 23 Dicembris, 1814. Obit 4 Junii, 1904. Filius amore impulsus hoc signum posuit 1905 ("To the ever-lasting memory of Alexander Nelson, 4th Duke of Bronte, Viscount Bridport, who into this delightful countryside, which he had received by meritorious inheritance from his illustrious ancestor the Immortal Hero of the Nile, brought a reverence of humanity and progress. He was born on 23 December 1814, he died on 4 June 1904. His son, moved by love, erected this sign in 1905").

== Career in England ==
He served as Controller of the Household and Equerry to Princess Mary Adelaide of Cambridge between 1892 and 1897 and was an Extra Gentleman Usher of the Privy Chambers to Queen Victoria from 1892 to 1901. He was Private Secretary to Mary of Teck as Princess of Wales from 1901 to 1910, and was then her Treasurer as Queen between 1910 and 1919. He was invested as a Knight Commander of the Royal Victorian Order.

== Death and burial ==
He died unmarried on 1 June 1937 at La Falconara in Taormina, Sicily, aged 82 and was initially buried in the garden of the villa, next to his sister Rosa Penelope Hood (1852–1922). Prior to the sale of the villa in 1948, both bodies were removed and reburied together in a single grave (with gravestone and monumental cross inscribed "Peace" also brought from Taormina) in the private Hood Cemetery at Maniace, in 2020 the last remaining possession of the Hood family in Sicily.

== Succession ==
On his death the heir to the duchy became his great-nephew Rowland Hood, 6th Duke of Bronte, 3rd Viscount Bridport (1911–1969), son of Lt. Hon. Maurice Hood (d. 1915), killed in action, who predeceased his father Arthur Hood, 2nd Viscount Bridport (1839–1924). He made Maniace his principal residence.

== Literary works ==
- Alexander Nelson Hood, 5th Duke of Bronte, Tales of Old Sicily, 1906.
- Alexander Nelson Hood, 5th Duke of Bronte, Sicilian Studies, 1915.
- Alexander Nelson Hood, 5th Duke of Bronte, The Duchy of Bronte: a memorandum written for his family in 1924.

== Bibliography ==
- Jordaan, Peter (2023), A Secret Between Gentlemen: Suspects, Strays and Guests, Alchemie Books, 2023 ISBN 978-0-6458527-4-5.

Titles of nobility
Preceded by Alexander Hood	Duke of Bronte; Kingdom of the Two Sicilies; 1904–1936	Succeeded by Rowland Hood
