= Charlotte Hood, 3rd Duchess of Bronte =

British noble (1787–1873)

Baroness Bridport Charlotte Mary Hood 3rd Duchess of Bronte
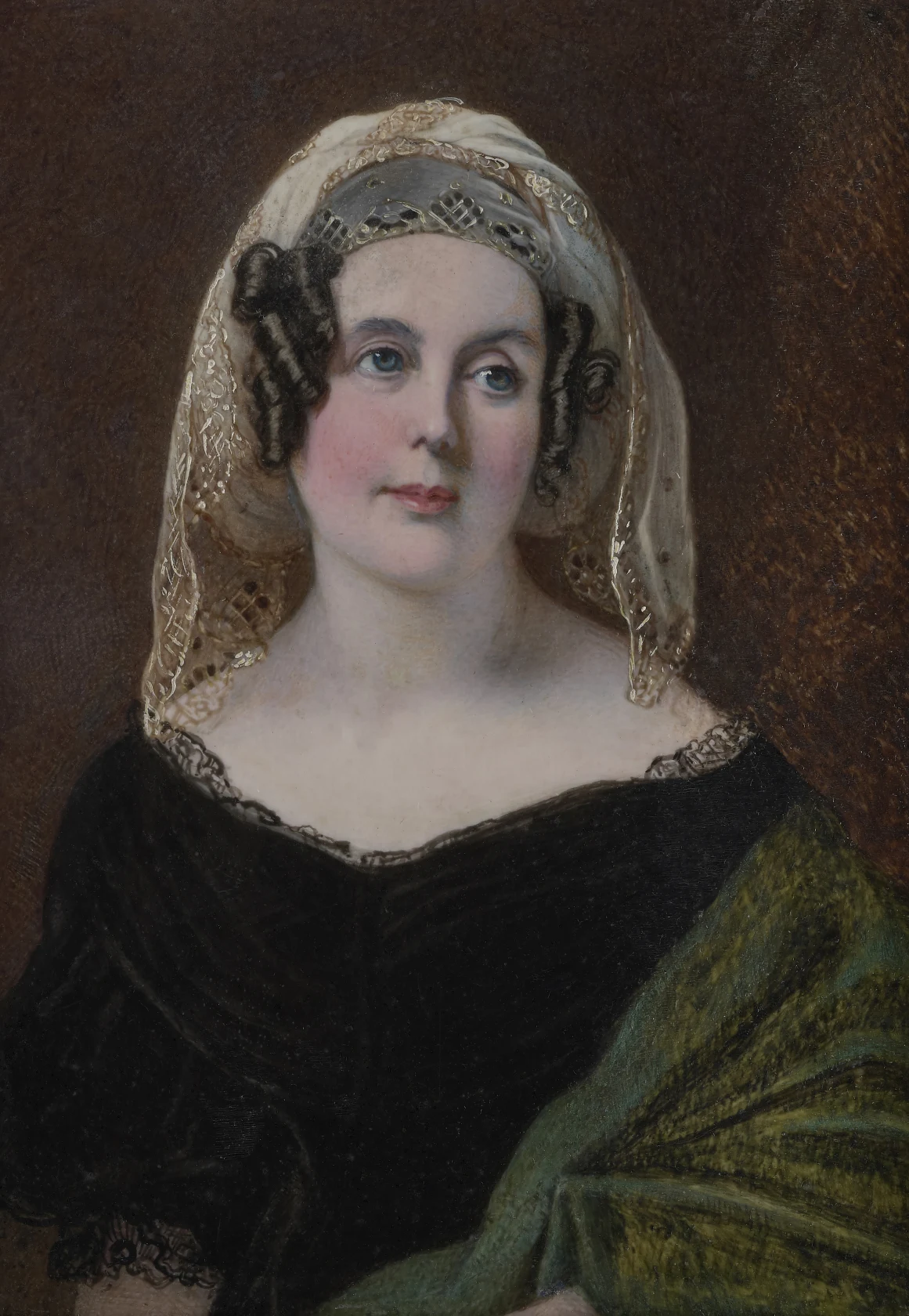
- Portrait miniature by Robert Thorburn (c. 1840–45)
- Born: 20 September 1787; Hilborough, Norfolk, England
- Died: 29 January 1873 (aged 85); Cricket St Thomas, Somerset, England
- Spouse: Samuel Hood (m. 1810; died 1868)
- Children: 7
- Parents: Rev. William Nelson (father); Sarah Yonge (mother)
- Relatives: Alexander Nelson Hood (son); Admiral Horatio Nelson (uncle); Thomas Bolton (brother); Henry Hood (father-in-law); John Lee Lee (son-in-law); Horace William Noel Rochfort (son-in-law); Capt. Sir Charles Hotham (son-in-law); John Walrond (son-in-law); Maj.-Gen. Sir Alexander Nelson Rochfort (grandson); Arthur Hood, 2nd Viscount Bridport (grandson); William Walrond, 1st Baron Waleran (grandson)

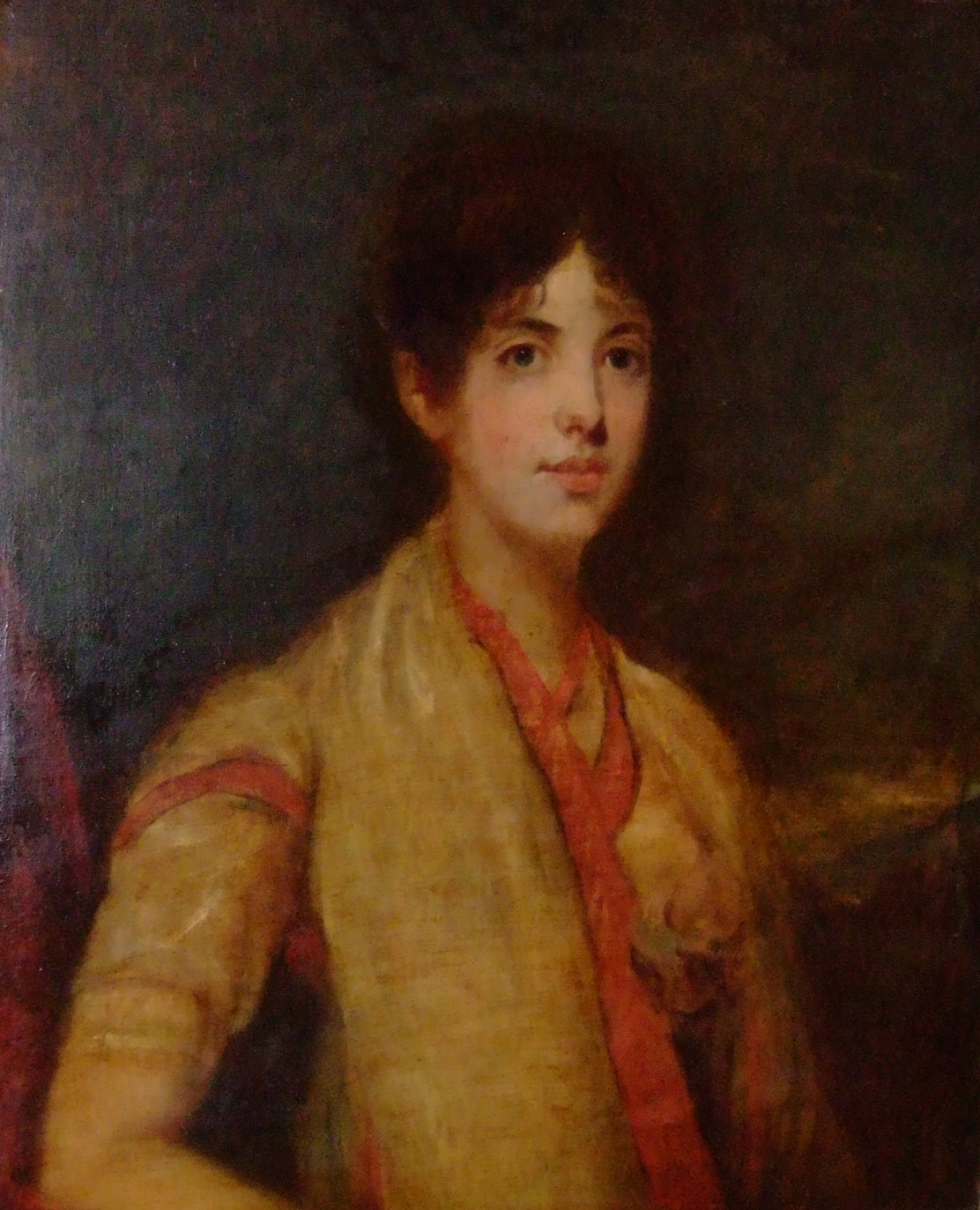
Portrait by unidentified painter

Charlotte Mary Hood, Baroness Bridport, 3rd Duchess of Bronte (née Nelson; 20 September 1787 – 29 January 1873) was an English aristocrat who inherited an Italian dukedom and estate between Bronte and Maniace in Sicily.

== Early life ==
Charlotte was born on 20 September 1787 in Hilborough, Norfolk. She was the only daughter, and only surviving child, of the Rev. William Nelson, 1st Earl Nelson, 2nd Duke of Bronte, and Sarah Yonge (a daughter of Rev. Henry Yonge). Her father was Rector of Brandon Parva and later of Hilborough, both in Norfolk, from 1814 seated at Trafalgar Park, Downton in Wiltshire and at nearby Redlynch House in Wiltshire. (Note: The 2nd Duke was a younger brother and heir of Admiral Horatio Nelson, 1st Viscount Nelson, 1st Duke of Bronte (1758–1805).)

== Peerage ==
As the niece and heiress of Admiral Horatio Nelson, 1st Viscount Nelson, Lady Bridport succeeded, suo jure, to the title of Duchess of Bronte (of the Kingdom of Two Sicilies) upon the death of her father in 1835. While she inherited her father's Sicilian dukedom, his British titles descended by special remainder, together with his British estates, to his nephew Thomas Bolton, who assumed the surname "Nelson" in accordance with the terms of the bequest.

She also inherited the Castello di Nelson, a grand manor house built by Horatio Nelson, and its large estate between Bronte and Maniace in Sicily on the north-west foothills of Mount Etna, held by her descendants until 1982. Her father found the local inhabitants were "turbulent, restless people" troublesome to the management of the estate, and like his brother the Admiral he never set foot in it.

== Personal life ==
On 3 July 1810, Charlotte was married to Samuel Hood, 2nd Baron Bridport, son of Henry Hood, 2nd Viscount Hood and the former Jane Wheler. Together, they were the parents of seven children:

- Hon. Mary Sophia Hood (1811–1888), who married, as his second wife, John Lee Lee, MP for Wells, in 1841.
- Hon. Charlotte Hood (1813–1906), who married Horace William Noel Rochfort, son of Col. John Staunton Rochfort, in 1845.
- Hon. Jane Sarah Hood (1817–1907), who married Hugh Holbech, son of William Holbech (son of William Holbech), in 1838. After his death in 1849, she married Capt. Sir Charles Hotham, Governor of Victoria and son of Rev. Hon. Frederick Hotham (a son of the 2nd Baron Hotham), in 1853. After his death in 1855, she married Capt. William Armytage of the Royal Navy, brother to Sir George Armytage, 5th Baronet, both sons of John Armytage, in 1860.
- Hon. Catherine Louisa Hood (1818–1893), who married Henry Hall of Barton Abbey in 1837.
- Hon. Frances Caroline Hood (1821–1903), who married Sir John Walrond, 1st Baronet, son of Benjamin Bowes Walrond, in 1845.
- Alexander Nelson Hood, 1st Viscount Bridport (1814–1904), also 4th Duke of Bronte; he married Lady Mary Penelope Hill, a daughter of Arthur Hill, 3rd Marquess of Downshire, in 1838.
- Hon. Horatio Nelson Hood (1826–1832), who died young.

Lord Bridport died on 6 January 1868. He was succeeded in his title by their eldest son, Alexander who was later created Viscount Bridport in the Peerage of the United Kingdom. Charlotte died at the age of 85 in Cricket St. Thomas, Somerset, England. She was buried in Cricket St. Thomas, Somerset. Upon her death, he also inherited the dukedom of Bronte as well.

=== Descendants ===
Through her daughter Charlotte, she was a grandmother of Maj.-Gen. Sir Alexander Nelson Rochfort (1850–1916), who served as Lieutenant Governor of Jersey.

Through her son Alexander, she was a grandmother of Arthur Hood, 2nd Viscount Bridport (1839–1924); Commander Hon. Horatio Nelson Sandys Hood (1843–1881); Hon. Sir Alexander Nelson Hood, 5th Duke of Bronte (1854–1937); Hon. Alfred Nelson Hood (1858–1918); Hon. Victor Albert Nelson Hood (1862–1929), Chamberlain to the Governor-General of Australia and Private Secretary to the Governor of Western Australia and the Governor of New South Wales; and Hon. Mary Hood (1846–1909) (wife of Hugh Seymour, 6th Marquess of Hertford).

Through her daughter Frances, she was a grandmother of William Walrond, 1st Baron Waleran (1849–1925); Arthur Melville Walrond (1861–1946); Katherine Mary Walrond (1846–1934), who married Charles Arthur Williams Troyte of Huntsham Court; Margaret Walrond, who married Charles Hepburn-Stuart-Forbes-Trefusis, 20th Baron Clinton of Heatnton Satchville; and Gertrude Walrond (1853–1920), who married Sir Thomas Dyke Acland, 12th Baronet, of Holnicote.

Titles of nobility
Preceded by William Nelson	Duchess of Bronte; Kingdom of the Two Sicilies; 1835–1873	Succeeded by Alexander Hood
