= Maniace =

Maniace Maniáki (Greek)
- Comune
- Comune di Maniace
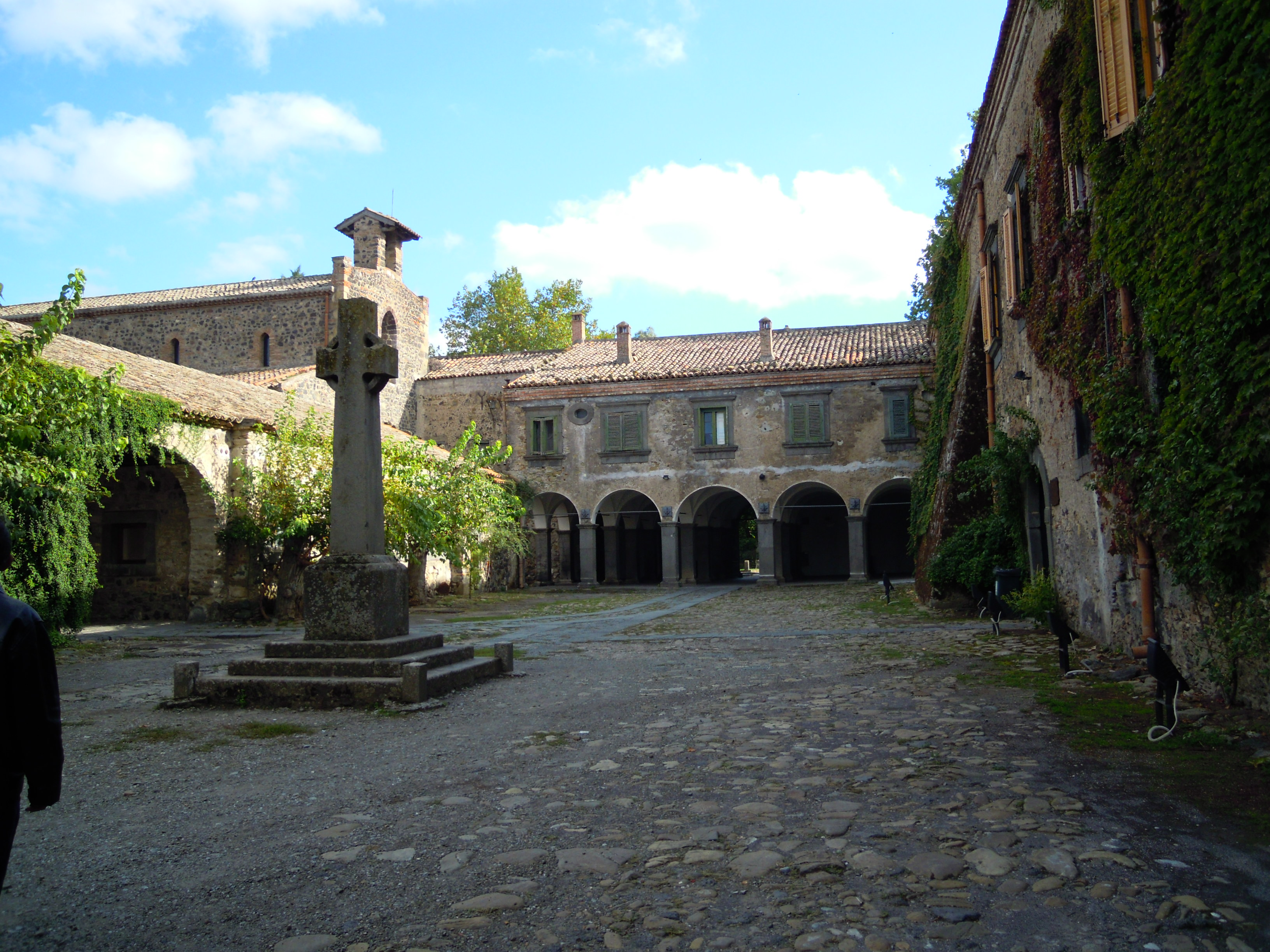
- Courtyard in the Castello di Maniace

- Location within Italy Location within Sicily
- Coordinates: 37°52′N 14°48′E
- Country: Italy
- Region: Sicily
- Metropolitan city: Catania (CT)

Government
  - Mayor: Franco Parracello Parasiliti

Area
  - Total: 37.7 km^{2} (14.6 sq mi)
- Elevation: 787 m (2,582 ft)

Population (31 December 2021)
  - Total: 3,753
  - Density: 99.5/km^{2} (258/sq mi)
- Demonym: Maniacesi
- Time zone: UTC+1 (CET)
  - Summer (DST): UTC+2 (CEST)
- Postal code: 95050
- Dialing code: 095
- Website: www.comune.maniace.ct.it

Maniace (Italian: Maniace; Sicilian: Maniaci) is a comune (municipality) in the Metropolitan City of Catania in the Italian region Sicily, located about 130 kilometres (81 mi) east of Palermo and about 45 kilometres (28 mi) northwest of Catania.

The municipality bears the name of George Maniakes (Greek: Γεώργιος Μανιάκης; Italian: Giorgio Maniace), a Byzantine general of the 11th century and catepan of Italy, known for his victories against the Arabs in Sicily.

== Main sights ==
=== Castello di Maniace ===
The Castello di Maniace, aliter Castello Bronte and Castello dei Nelson ("Castle of the Nelsons"), is a manor house built on the site of a former ancient monastery 3 km south of the centre of the small village of Maniace and 8 km north of the large town of Bronte, on the eastern foothills of Mount Etna. From 1799 to 1981 it was the seat of the Dukes of Bronte, English noblemen, the first of whom was Admiral Horatio Nelson, 1st Viscount Nelson (1758–1805), in 1799 created Duke of Bronte by King Ferdinand III of Sicily and Naples. In 1981 the manor house and large estate was sold to the Commune of Bronte by Alexander Hood, 4th Viscount Bridport (born 1948), 7th Duke of Bronte, descended from the daughter of William Nelson, 1st Earl Nelson (1757–1835) 2nd Duke of Bronte, elder brother and heir of Admiral Nelson.

=== Monastic Church of St. Mary ===
The nave and magnificent West Door (main entrance) of the ancient Norman-style (called Romanesque in Italy) monastic church, dedicated to Santa Maria, survives with part of the cloister, as one side of the rectangular courtyard of the manorial buildings, in the centre of which survives an ancient stone well. The former apse, chancel and transept tower of the church (roughly the entire eastern half) is missing, believed to have collapsed during the terrible earthquake of 1693, with the site partly built over later by a new granary building in which the foundations of the triple apse were recently discovered. Since 1981 the granary building has been converted by the Council of Bronte into a conference hall.

The church with the other adjoining manorial buildings were restored and reconstructed in 1800 on the order of Admiral Nelson, 1st Duke of Bronte, who never set foot on his estate, having been killed 5 years later in heroic circumstances during the Battle of Trafalgar.
