= Alexander Hood, 4th Viscount Bridport =

British noble (born 1948)

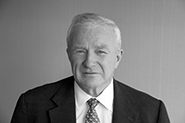
Alexander Nelson Hood, 4th Viscount Bridport

Alexander Nelson Hood, 4th Viscount Bridport, 7th Duke of Bronte (Note: In the now-unrecognised nobility of Sicily.) (born 17 March 1948), known as Alex Bridport, is a British investment banker, resident in Geneva, Switzerland.

== Early life ==
He is the only son and heir of Rowland Hood, 3rd Viscount Bridport, 6th Duke of Bronte (1911–1969), of Castello di Maniace near Bronte in Sicily (a descendant of William Nelson, 1st Earl Nelson, 2nd Duke of Bronte, elder brother and heir of Vice Admiral Horatio Nelson, 1st Viscount Nelson, 1st Duke of Bronte), by his second wife Sheila Jeanne Agatha van Meurs, only daughter of Johan Hendrik van Meurs and widow of Wing Commander J. H. Little, DFC, Auxiliary Air Force.

== Career ==
He grew up in the Castello di Maniace, Sicily, and was educated at Eton College and the Sorbonne. He joined Kleinwort Benson merchant bank in London, before going on to Chase Manhattan Bank which sent him to Geneva in 1985 to be General Manager of Investment Banking. He was appointed managing director of Shearson Lehman Brothers, New York, in 1988. In 1991 he set up Bridport & Cie S.A. in Geneva, Switzerland, with Thomas Bartholdi, and both remain managing partners, together with Count Luca Padulli. In 1981, facing an on-going turbulent political situation in Italy and the prospect of further demands for land reform from an historically inimical faction of the local population, he sold his paternal estate of the Duchy of Bronte and his seat within it, the Castello di Maniace, granted to Admiral Nelson in 1799 by Ferdinand I of the Two Sicilies.

== Marriages and issue ==
He married twice:

- Firstly, on 5 January 1972, to Linda Jacqueline Paravicini, a daughter of Lt-Col Vincent Rudolph Paravicini, TD, of Nutley Manor near Basingstoke, Hampshire (a son of Charles Paravicini, the Swiss Ambassador to the Court of St. James's), by his wife Jacqueline Dyer, a sister of Sir John Dyer, 13th Baronet.

She obtained a divorce in 1979 and in 1983 remarried to Michael Howard, 21st Earl of Suffolk (1935–2022) of Charlton Park, near Malmesbury, Wiltshire. By his first wife he had issue:

- Peregrine Alexander Nelson Hood (born 1974), eldest son and heir apparent, who on 8 June 2013 at St John the Baptist, Charlton, Malmesbury (his step-father's parish church), married Serena Nikkhah (b. 1983), an Iranian-American and Executive Fashion Editor at British Vogue magazine. Guests included Princess Michael of Kent, Tom Parker Bowles and Pippa Middleton.

- Secondly, on 5 December 1979, he married Nina Lincoln (widow of Formula 1 racing driver Jochen Rindt) from whom he was divorced in 1999, having had a further son:
  - Anthony Nelson Hood (born 1983).

== Notes ==
Peerage of the United Kingdom
| Preceded by Rowland Hood | Viscount Bridport; 1969–present | Incumbent; Heir apparent: Hon. Peregrine Hood |
Titles of nobility
| Preceded by Rowland Hood | Duke of Bronte; Kingdom of the Two Sicilies; 1969–present | Incumbent; Heir apparent: Hon. Peregrine Hood |
