= Viscount Bridport =

British viscountcy

Viscountcy of Bridport
- Quarterly: 1st and 4th, Azure a fret Argent on a Chief Or three Crescents Sable (Hood); 2nd and 3rd, Or a Cross patonce Sable a Bend Gules surmounted of another engrailed of the field charged with three Bombs fired proper on a Chief undulated Argent waves of the Sea from which a Palm Tree issuant between a Disabled Ship on the dexter and a Battery in Ruins on the sinister all proper over all a Fess wavy Azure thereon inscribed the word "Trafalgar" Or (Nelson).
- Creation date: 6 July 1868
- Creation: Second
- Created by: Queen Victoria
- Peerage: Peerage of the United Kingdom
- First holder: Alexander Hood, 1st Viscount Bridport
- Present holder: Alexander Hood, 4th Viscount Bridport
- Heir apparent: The Hon. Peregrine Alexander Nelson Hood
- Status: Extant
- Motto: STEADY

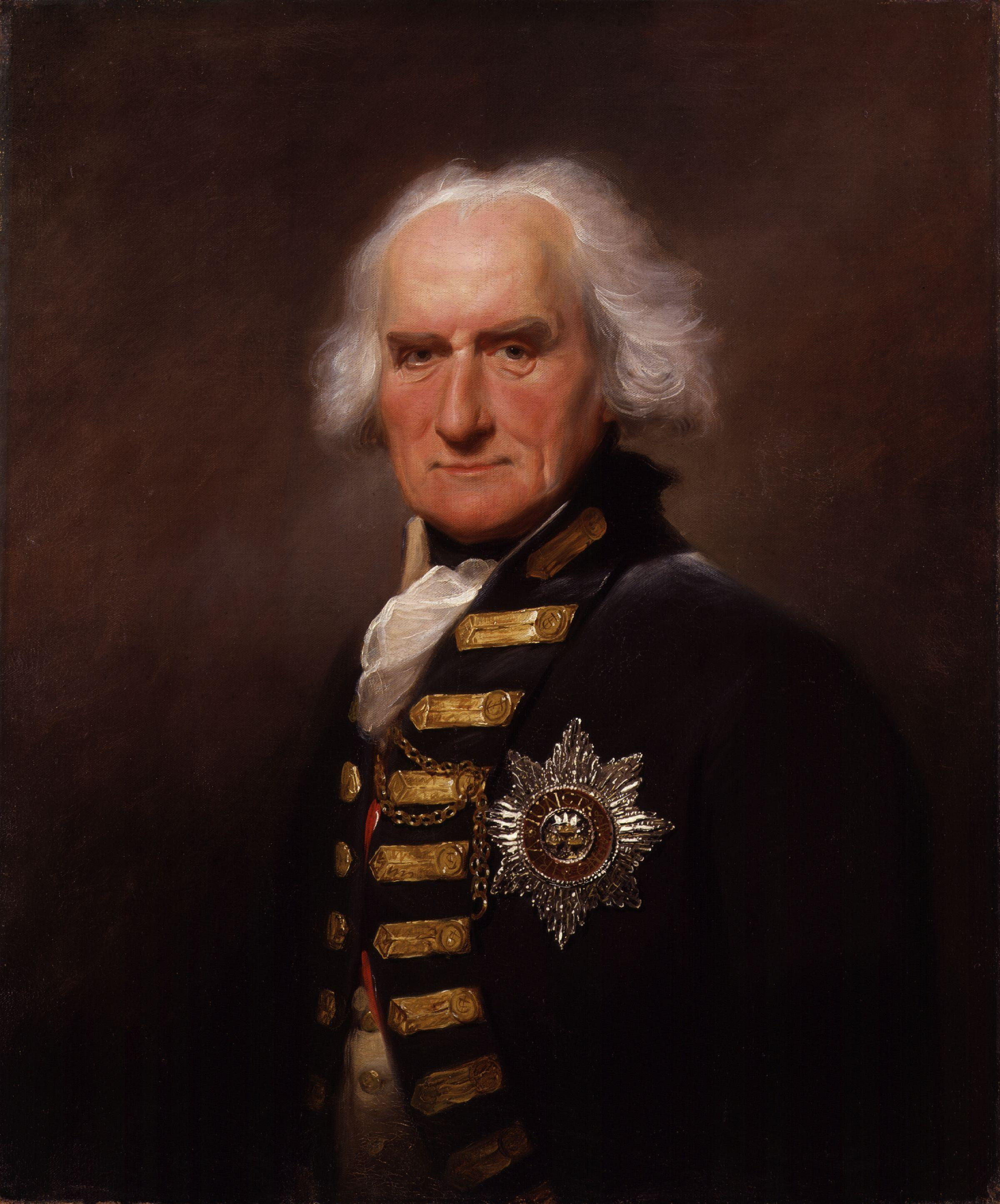
Alexander Hood, 1st Viscount Bridport, 1795 portrait by Lemuel Francis Abbott.

Arms of Hood, Viscount Bridport: Azure, a fret argent on a chief or three crescents sable.

Arms of William Nelson, 1st Earl Nelson, 2nd Duke of Bronte, being the augmented arms of his younger brother Admiral Horatio Nelson further augmented with a fess wavy azure thereon inscribed the word "Trafalgar" or. Today quartered by Hood, Viscount Bridport, descendants of the 1st Earl's daughter, the 3rd Duchess of Bronte.

Viscount Bridport is a title that has been created twice, once in the Peerage of Great Britain and once in the Peerage of the United Kingdom. The first creation became extinct in 1814, while the second creation is extant.

== History ==
Sir Alexander Hood, younger brother of Samuel Hood, 1st Viscount Hood, was a prominent naval commander. In 1794, he was created Baron Bridport in the Peerage of Ireland, with remainder to his great-nephew Samuel Hood, second son of Henry Hood (later 2nd Viscount Hood), eldest son of the 1st Viscount Hood, and in failure thereof to the heirs male of his uncle Alexander Hood (who was the ancestor of the Fuller-Acland-Hood baronets of St Audries and the Barons St Audies). In 1796, he was created Baron Bridport, of Cricket St Thomas in the County of Somerset, in the Peerage of Great Britain, and in 1800, he was even further honoured when he was made Viscount Bridport, of Cricket St Thomas in the County of Somerset, also in the Peerage of Great Britain. The latter titles were created with normal remainders to the male heirs of his body.

The 1st Viscount Bridport died without male issue in 1814, and the barony of 1796 and the viscountcy of 1800 became extinct. However, he was succeeded in the barony of 1794, according to the special remainder, by his aforementioned great-nephew, Samuel Hood, the 2nd Baron Bridport. He notably represented Heytesbury in Parliament. In 1810, the 2nd Baron Bridport married Lady Charlotte Mary Nelson, 3rd Duchess of Bronte, the only surviving child and heiress of William Nelson, 1st Earl Nelson, elder brother of Horatio Nelson, 1st Viscount Nelson. Lord Bridport was succeeded by his son Alexander Hood, the 3rd Baron Bridport. He was a General in the Army. In 1868, he was further created Viscount Bridport, of Cricket St Thomas in the County of Somerset and of Bronte, in the Peerage of the United Kingdom, a revival of the title given to his great-great-uncle sixty-eight years earlier. In 1873, he also inherited from his mother the title of Duke of Bronte (Italian: Duca di Bronte), of the Kingdom of Sicily and the Duchy of Maniace. This ducal title was conferred on his great-great-uncle, Horatio Nelson, in 1799 by King Ferdinand, as a reward for his support of the monarchy.

While his eldest son Arthur Hood succeeded him as 2nd Viscount Bridport, he left the Dukedom of Bronte to his younger son, the Hon. Sir Alexander Nelson Hood, who became the 5th Duke of Bronte. This was possible because of a special and unusual clause in the letters patent granting the dukedom, which allowed the title's holder to choose whoever he wanted as successor. The 2nd Viscount represented West Somerset in Parliament as a Conservative. He was succeeded by his grandson Rowland Hood, the 3rd Viscount Bridport and 6th Duke of Bronte. He was the son of the Hon. Maurice Henry Nelson Hood, who was killed in action at Gallipoli in 1915. The 3rd Viscount Bridport was a Lieutenant-Commander in the Royal Navy and also held minor political office from 1939 to 1940 under Neville Chamberlain.

The titles are currently held by his only surviving son, Alexander Hood, the 4th Viscount Bridport and 7th Duke of Bronte, who succeeded in 1969. As a descendant of Samuel Hood, 1st Viscount Hood, he is also in remainder to this peerage and its subsidiary titles.

== Viscount Bridport, first creation ==
=== Baron Bridport (1794, 1796) ===
- Alexander Hood, 1st Baron Bridport (1726–1814) (created Viscount Bridport in 1800)
- Samuel Hood, 2nd Baron Bridport (1788–1868)
- Alexander Nelson Hood, 3rd Baron Bridport (1814–1904) (created Viscount Bridport in 1868)

=== Viscount Bridport (1800) ===
- Alexander Hood, 1st Viscount Bridport (1726–1814)

== Viscount Bridport, second creation (1868) ==
- Alexander Nelson Hood, 1st Viscount Bridport (1814–1904)
- Arthur Wellington Alexander Nelson Hood, 2nd Viscount Bridport (1839–1924)
- Rowland Arthur Herbert Nelson Hood, 3rd Viscount Bridport (1911–1969)
- Alexander Nelson Hood, 4th Viscount Bridport (born 1948)

The heir apparent is the present holder's son, the Hon. Peregrine Alexander Nelson Hood (born 1974).
The heir apparent's heir presumptive is his half-brother, the Hon. Anthony Nelson Hood (born 1983).

== Dukes of Bronte (1799) ==
The title of Duke of Bronte (Italian: Duca di Bronte) refers to the town of Bronte in Sicily. The title was granted in 1799 to the English vice-admiral Horatio Nelson by King Ferdinand III of Sicily.

The holders of this title have been:

- Horatio Nelson, 1st Duke of Bronte, 1st Viscount Nelson (1758–1805)
- William Nelson, 2nd Duke of Bronte, 1st Earl Nelson (1757–1835) (elder brother)
- Charlotte Mary Nelson, 3rd Duchess of Bronte (1787–1873) (daughter)
- Alexander Nelson Hood, 4th Duke of Bronte, 1st Viscount Bridport (1814–1904) (son) (previously created Viscount Bridport; see above)
- Sir Alexander Nelson Hood, 5th Duke of Bronte (1904–1937) (younger son, by bequest)
- Rowland Arthur Herbert Nelson Hood, 6th Duke of Bronte, 3rd Viscount Bridport (1911–1969) (great-nephew)
- Alexander Nelson Hood, 7th Duke of Bronte, 4th Viscount Bridport (born 1948) (son)

The heir apparent is the present holder's son, the Hon. Peregrine Alexander Nelson Hood (born 1974).
The heir apparent's heir presumptive is his eldest daughter, Honor Linda Nelson Hood (born 2016).

== Family tree ==
Nelson family tree

Baroness Hood, of Catherington (GB), 1795	Baronet Hood, of Catherington (GB), 1778; Baron Hood of Catherington (Ireland), 1782; Viscount Hood of Whitley (UK, 1st creation), 1796	Baron Bridport (Ireland), 1794; Viscount Bridport (UK, 1st creation), 1800
Edmund Nelson; 1722–1802	Susannah Linzee; 1726–1806; Baroness Hood, suo jure	Samuel Hood; 1724–1816; 1st Viscount Hood, etc.	Alexander Hood; 1726–1814; 1st Baron Bridport, 1st Viscount Bridport
Viscounty Bridport (1st creation) extinct, 1814
Earl Nelson (UK), of Trafalgar and of Merton and Viscount Merton (UK), of Trafalgar and of Merton, 1805	Baron Nelson (GB), of the Nile, and of Burnham Thorpe (1st creation), 1798; Duke of Bronte (Italy), 1799; Viscount Nelson (UK), of the Nile, and of Burnham Thorpe, 1801; Baron Nelson (UK), of the Nile, and of Hilborough, 1801
Susannah Nelson 1755–1813	William Nelson; 1757–1835; 2nd Duke of Bronte, 1st Earl Nelson, etc., 2nd Baron Nelson of the Nile and of Hilborough	Horatio Nelson; 1758–1805; 1st Duke of Bronte, Viscount Nelson, Baron Nelson of the Nile and of Burnham Thorpe, 1st Baron Nelson of the Nile and of Hilborough	Henry Hood; 1753–1836; 2nd Viscount Hood, etc.
Barony Nelson of the Nile and of Hilborough extinct, 1835	Viscounty Nelson and Barony Nelson of the Nile and of Burnham Thorpe extinct, 1805
Thomas Bolton, later Nelson; 1786–1835; 2nd Earl Nelson, etc.	Charlotte Mary Hood; 1787–1873; 3rd Duchess of Bronte suo jure	Samuel Hood; 1788–1868; 2nd Baron Bridport
Viscount Bridport (UK, 2nd creation), 1868
Horatio Nelson; 1823–1913; 3rd Earl Nelson, etc.	Alexander Nelson Hood; 1814–1904; 4th Duke of Bronte, 1st Viscount Bridport, 3rd Baron Bridport
Thomas Horatio Nelson; 1857–1947; 4th Earl Nelson, etc.	Edward Agar Horatio Nelson; 1860–1951; 5th Earl Nelson, etc.	Arthur Wellington Alexander Nelson Hood; 1839–1924; 2nd Viscount Bridport, 4th Baron Bridport	Alexander Hood; 1854–1937; 5th Duke of Bronte
Maurice Henry Nelson Hood; 1881–1915
Albert Francis Joseph Horatio Nelson; 1890–1957; 6th Earl Nelson, etc.	Henry Edward Joseph Horatio Nelson; 1894–1972; 7th Earl Nelson, etc.	George Joseph Horatio Nelson; 1905–1981; 8th Earl Nelson, etc.	John Marie Joseph Horatio Nelson; 1908–1970	Rowland Arthur Herbert Nelson Hood; 1911–1969; 6th Duke of Bronte, 3rd Viscount Bridport, 4th Baron Bridport
Peter John Horatio Nelson; 1941–2009; 9th Earl Nelson, etc.	Alexander Nelson Hood b. 1948; 7th Duke of Bronte, 4th Viscount Bridport, 5th Baron Bridport
Simon John Horatio Nelson b. 1971; 10th Earl Nelson, etc.	Peregrine Alexander Nelson Hood b. 1974
Heir apparent to the Dukedom of Bronte and Viscounty and Barony Bridport
Thomas John Horatio Nelson b. 2010 styled Viscount Merton
Heir apparent to the Nelson Earldom

== See also ==
- Earl Nelson
- Hood baronets
- Viscount Hood
