= John Graeffer =

John Graefer or Johann Andreas Graeffer (1 January 1746 – 7 August 1802) was a German botanist nurseryman born in Helmstedt. Graeffer/Graefer is remembered by garden historians as having introduced a number of exotic plants to British gardens and to have worked for the king of Naples at the palace of Caserta.

Trained by Philip Miller at the Chelsea Physic Garden, London, one of the most prominent botanical gardens of Europe during the 18th century, Graeffer was subsequently gardener to the Earl of Coventry at Croome Court, Worcestershire, which was being landscaped by Capability Brown, and then to James Vere, of Kensington Gore, a founder of the Royal Horticultural Society Graeffer struck out on his own as a partner with Archibald Thompson and the prominent nurseryman James Gordon in Gordon's long-established Mile End nursery near the New Globe, Stepney, just beyond the East End of London. After Gordon's retirement and his death in 1780, the nursery at Mile End was inherited by Gordon's three sons.

In August 1781, it was reported in L'ésprit des Journaux, that MM Grœffer et Bessel had been issued a royal patent (dated 30 December 1780) for their preparation of cooked and preserved vegetables for the Royal Navy and the use of those on sea voyages; it was the first recorded patent for preserving vegetables by drying them. For that purpose, it was reported, they had purchased 200 arpents of land near the "nouvelle globe", Mile End, for plantings, which appears to be Gordon's long-established plant nursery. The patent was issued for preserving "a vegetable of the Brassica kind, generally known by the name of green and brown borecole, scotch or other kale with a salt solution and drying so it will keep for up to a year."

Among Graeffer's introductions to British horticulture by far the most familiar was the variegated form of Aucuba japonica, the loved and loathed "Spotted Laurel" of gardens, which he introduced to British horticulture in 1783, at first as a plant for a heated greenhouse; it became widely cultivated as the "Gold Plant" by 19th-century gardeners. According to John Claudius Loudon he was also responsible for the introduction of Pyrus bollwylleriana, the Bollwyller pear (later called Shipova), and P. baccata (later called Malus baccata), the Siberian wild crab. Another of his introductions was Sideroxylon melanophloeos (later called Rapanea melanophloeos), from the Cape Province, 1784.

Not all his introductions took: in 1783 Graeffer introduced Fumaria nobilis, a little alpine plant native to the Altai in Siberia, but it was subsequently lost to horticulture and reintroduced; he catalogued 80 species of plants suitable for rock gardens in 1789. Graham Stuart Thomas who knew the 1794 edition, found it "certainly the first 'quick reference' book on alpines that I have come across: he gives full particulars of descriptions and cultivation in a tabulated list. I think he was entitled to claim: 'The Author proposes in his use of his great variety of Herbaceous Plants a more constant and uniform and gay Attraction of Gardens, than has been hitherto pointed out, or adopted'".

He also issued A Descriptive Catalogue of Upwards of Eleven Hundred Species and Varieties of Herbaceous Or Perennial Plants that same year.

In the 1790s Graeffer obtained a recommendation from Sir Joseph Banks, to be employed as head gardener to the king of Naples; at the royal palace of Caserta he introduced elements of the English landscape garden to the extensive formal plan, the Giardino Inglese instigated by Sir William Hamilton, for King Ferdinand, who eventually took an interest in it, after Sir William had urged Queen Maria Carolina, as Hamilton reported to Banks from Caserta 22 April 1794, "that it would be a constant reproach to this country the having had by your goodness such a man as Graeffer for more than ten years without having had the least profit from his well known talents". A knowledgeable visitor, Sir James Edward Smith, founder of the Linnean Society, has left an account of Graeffer's unsuccessful try at introducing the English taste:

Mr Graeffer, a very ingenious gardener recommended to the queen of Naples by sir Joseph Banks, was then employed in laying out a garden for her majesty in the English taste, to which purpose a portion of ground was allotted nor far from the palace; but unluckily in full view of a stupendous brick wall, built with Herculean labour for the purpose of keeping the above-mentioned cascade in its place. No plantation whatever could conceal this glaring wall from any part of the garden; nor could any climbing plants reach near to its top. The ground was besides occupied by miserable olives, with scarcely a picturesque tree to turn to account. Nevertheless Mr. Graeffer had succeeded, we thought, wonderfully. He had formed some very pleasant lawns, interspersed with clumps of myrtle and other shrubs, and the whole wore a very promising appearance. But unfortunately none of the Neapolitans could see any kind of beauty in his performances, and they complained of his introducing so vulgar a thing as myrtle! The queen was much disposed to be pleased, but she could not stem the tide of opinion; nor did the king approve of the expense: so the whole was given up some time after.

With more success, Graeffer, who must have had plenty of time on his hands, published a catalogue of the plants at Caserta, Synopsis plantarum regii viridarii Caserti (Naples 1803).

In 1799, on Sir William Hamilton's suggestion, he became bailiff of Admiral Horatio Nelson's estate at Bronte, Sicily, where Graeffer was expected to reorganize the agriculture along progressive English lines; his extravagant ideas, however, consumed the income Nelson expected from the estate: to Lady Hamilton Nelson wrote "I hope Graeffer is going on so at Bronté; I am sure I take nothing from that estate.". Graeffer died in Bronte in 1802.
