= Castello di Maniace =

Manor house in Maniace, Italy

Coordinates: 37.8588°N 14.8183°E

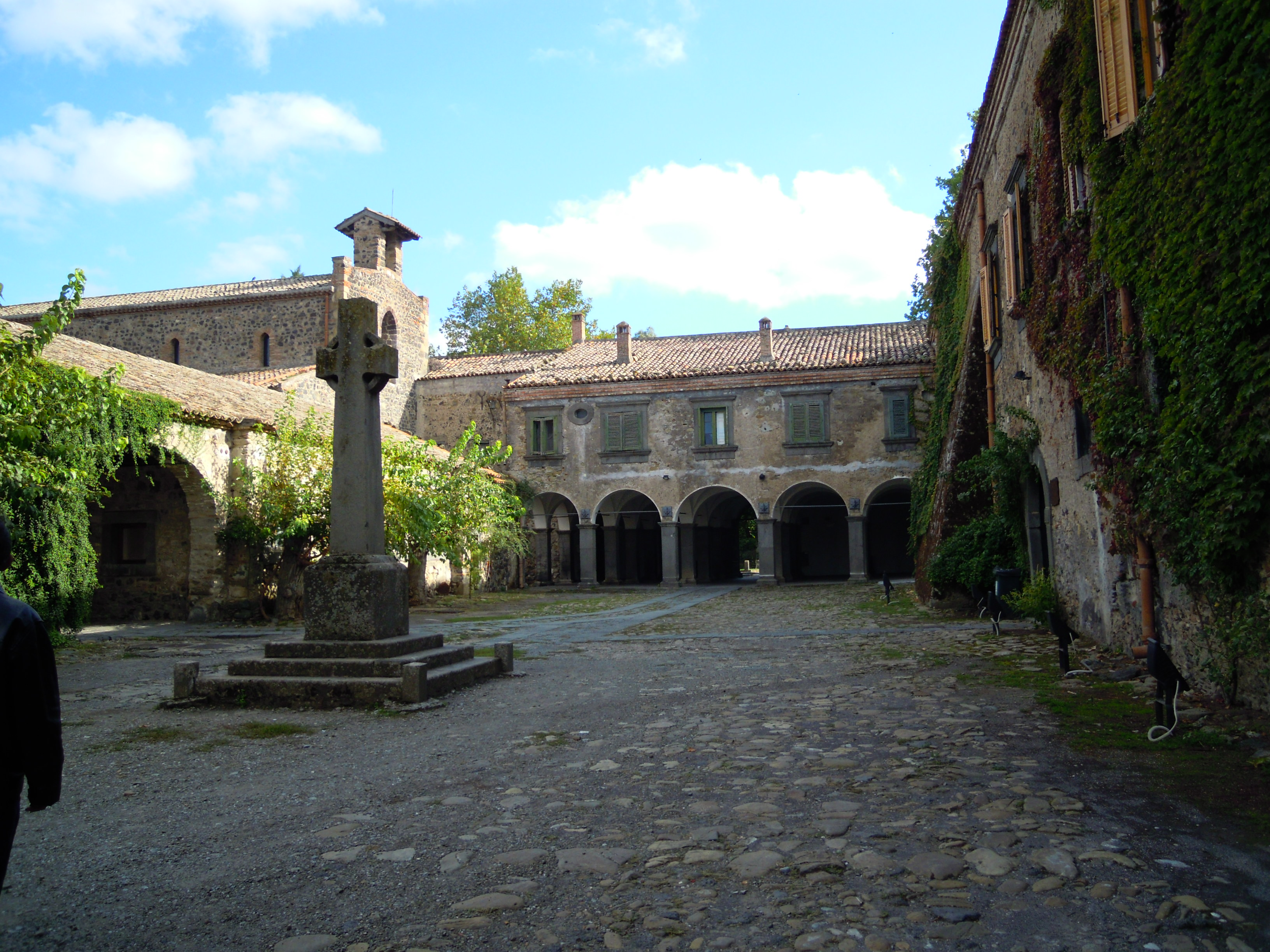
The courtyard

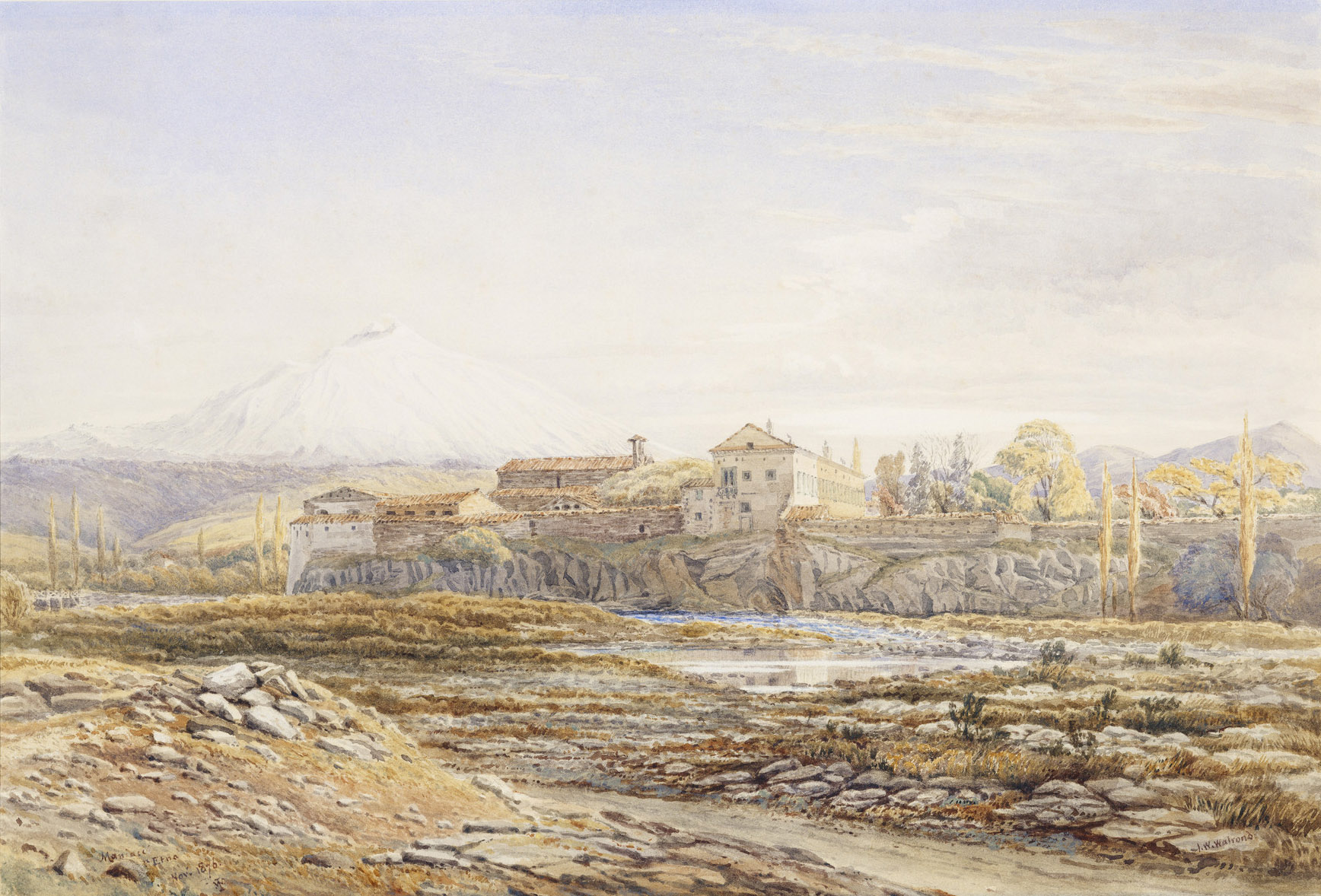
Castello di Maniace, caput of the Dukedom of Bronte, situated 5 miles north of the town of Bronte. Viewed from north across the dried up river bed of the River Saraceno, with Mount Etna in the background (the main crater of which is 15 km to the south-east). Painted in 1876 by Sir John Walrond, 1st Baronet (1818–1889), son-in-law of the 3rd Duchess of Bronte. Royal Collection

Floor plan of Castello di Maniace

The Castello di Maniace (or Castello Bronte and Castello dei Nelson 'Castle of the Nelsons') is a manor house built on the site of a former ancient monastery 3 km south of the centre of the small village of Maniace and 8 km north of the large town of Bronte, on the eastern foothills of Mount Etna. From 1799 to 1981 it was the seat of the Dukes of Bronte, English noblemen, the first of whom was Admiral Horatio Nelson, 1st Viscount Nelson (1758–1805), in 1799 created Duke of Bronte by King Ferdinand III of Sicily and Naples. In 1981 the manor house and large estate was sold to the Commune of Bronte by Alexander Hood, 4th Viscount Bridport (born 1948), 7th Duke of Bronte, descended from the daughter of William Nelson, 1st Earl Nelson (1757–1835) 2nd Duke of Bronte, elder brother and heir of Admiral Nelson.

== Abbey of Santa Maria of Maniace ==
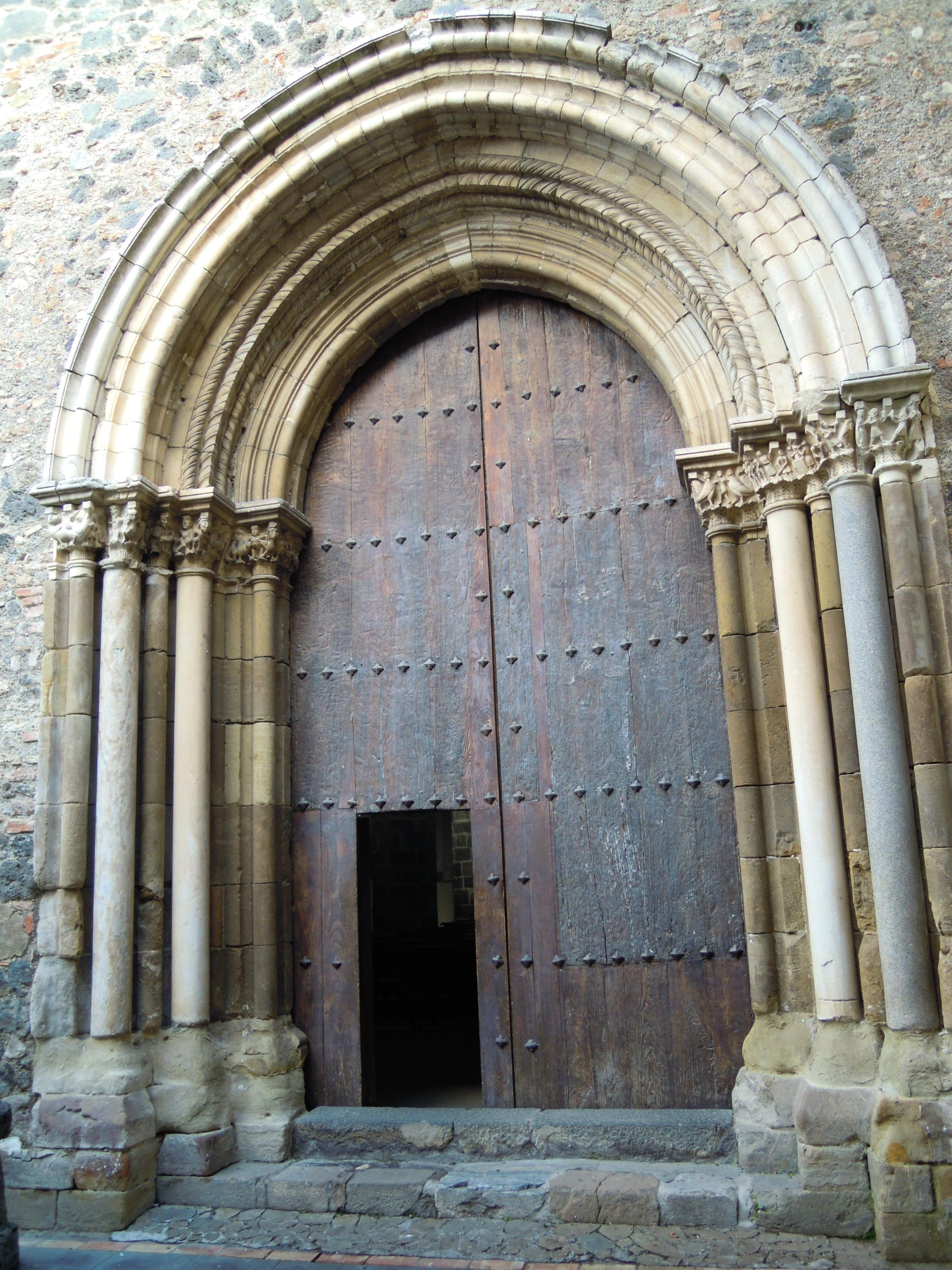

The Castello di Maniace is situated on the left bank of the River Saraceno on the site of the former Benedictine Abbey of Santa Maria of Maniace, built in 1174 by the Norman William II of Sicily ("The Good"), King of Sicily from 1166 to 1189 (seated at Palermo) and husband of Princess Joan of England (1165–1199), a daughter of King Henry II (1154–1189) of England. It was dedicated to the Virgin Mary (Santa Maria), by the express wish of his mother Queen Margaret of Navarre, in memory of the great Battle of Maniace in 1040, won near the site by Giorgio Maniace against the Arabs.

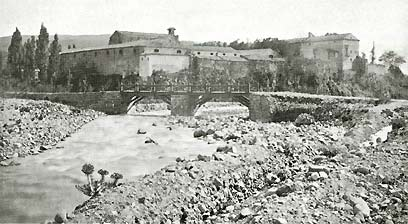
Castello di Maniace in 1885, showing the old bridge over the River Saraceno, built by one of the dukes, on which tolls were levied from crossing traffic

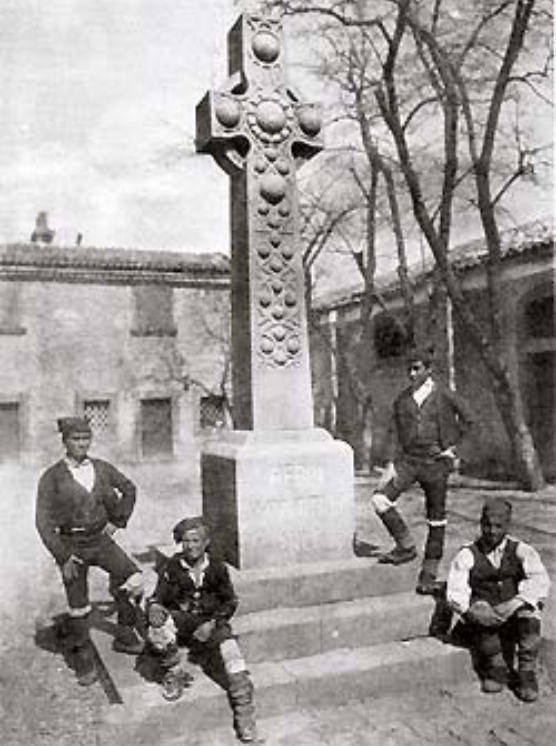
Celtic cross monument to Admiral Lord Nelson, with contadini (peasant farmers), Castello di Maniace, erected in 1891 by the 5th Duke, whose close friend and frequent visitor was the "Celtic" poet William Sharp (d.1905), buried in the ducal cemetery. Photo published 1903
