= William Nelson, 1st Earl Nelson =

Elder brother of Horatio Nelson, 1st Viscount Nelson (1757–1835)

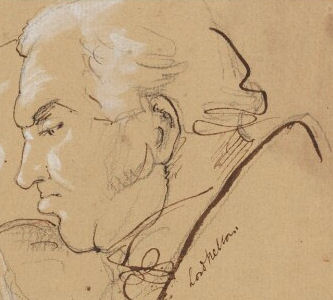
William Nelson, 1st Earl Nelson c. 1820 in a sketch by Sir George Hayter

Arms of William Nelson, 1st Earl Nelson, 2nd Duke of Bronte, being the augmented arms of his younger brother Admiral Horatio Nelson further augmented with a fess wavy azure thereon inscribed the word "Trafalgar" or. Today quartered by Hood, Viscount Bridport, descendants of the 1st Earl's daughter the 3rd Duchess of Bronte

William Nelson, 1st Earl Nelson, 2nd Duke of Bronte (20 April 1757 – 28 February 1835), was an Anglican clergyman and an older brother of Horatio Nelson, 1st Viscount Nelson.

== Life ==
Nelson was born in Burnham Thorpe, into a family that had been settled in Norfolk for generations. His father, Reverend Edmund Nelson (1722–1802), was Rector of Hillborough and of Burnham Thorpe. His mother was Catherine Suckling, whose maternal grandmother Mary was the sister of Robert Walpole and of Horatio Walpole, 1st Baron Walpole of Wolterton. A younger brother was naval commander Horatio Nelson.

Nelson was educated at Christ's College, Cambridge, matriculating in 1774, graduating B.A. 1778, M.A. 1781, D.D. 1802. He was ordained deacon in 1779 and priest in 1781.

He became rector of Brandon Parva in Norfolk in January 1784, and went to sea that year as a naval chaplain on HMS Boreas (commanded by his brother the future Admiral), but obtained his discharge in October 1786 and returned to Brandon Parva. He became rector of Hilborough in 1797, and a prebendary of Canterbury Cathedral in 1803.

William Nelson succeeded by a special remainder, which included his father's and sisters' male issue, to one of Horatio Nelson's baronies (Baron Nelson, of the Nile and of Hilborough in the County of Norfolk, created in 1801) upon the latter's death at the Battle of Trafalgar on 21 October 1805, as well as to the dukedom of Bronte, of the Kingdom of the Two Sicilies. A month later, on 20 November 1805, in honour of his late brother's achievements, he was created Earl Nelson and Viscount Merton, both of Trafalgar and of Merton in the County of Surrey, again with a special remainder including the male issue of his sisters.

He was reportedly an ambitious man, and used Nelson's mistress Emma Hamilton's generosity and hospitality when it served his purpose, including hosting his son Horatio at her home during the Eton school holidays, but cut both her and Horatia Nelson, Emma's daughter by Lord Nelson, off after Nelson's death. He did not respect his brother's wishes to look after Horatia.

He moved to Trafalgar Park after Standlynch Park was renamed thus by an act of Parliament, the Purchase of Estate for Lord Nelson Act 1815 (55 Geo. 3. c. 96).

He died without surviving male issue, Horatio (recently made Viscount Trafalgar) having died at the age of 19 of tuberculosis in 1808, and all of his British titles passed to Thomas Bolton, the son of his sister Susannah. The Sicilian dukedom of Bronte passed to his daughter Charlotte, wife of Samuel Hood, 2nd Baron Bridport.

There is a memorial to him in the crypt at St Paul's Cathedral.

== Family ==
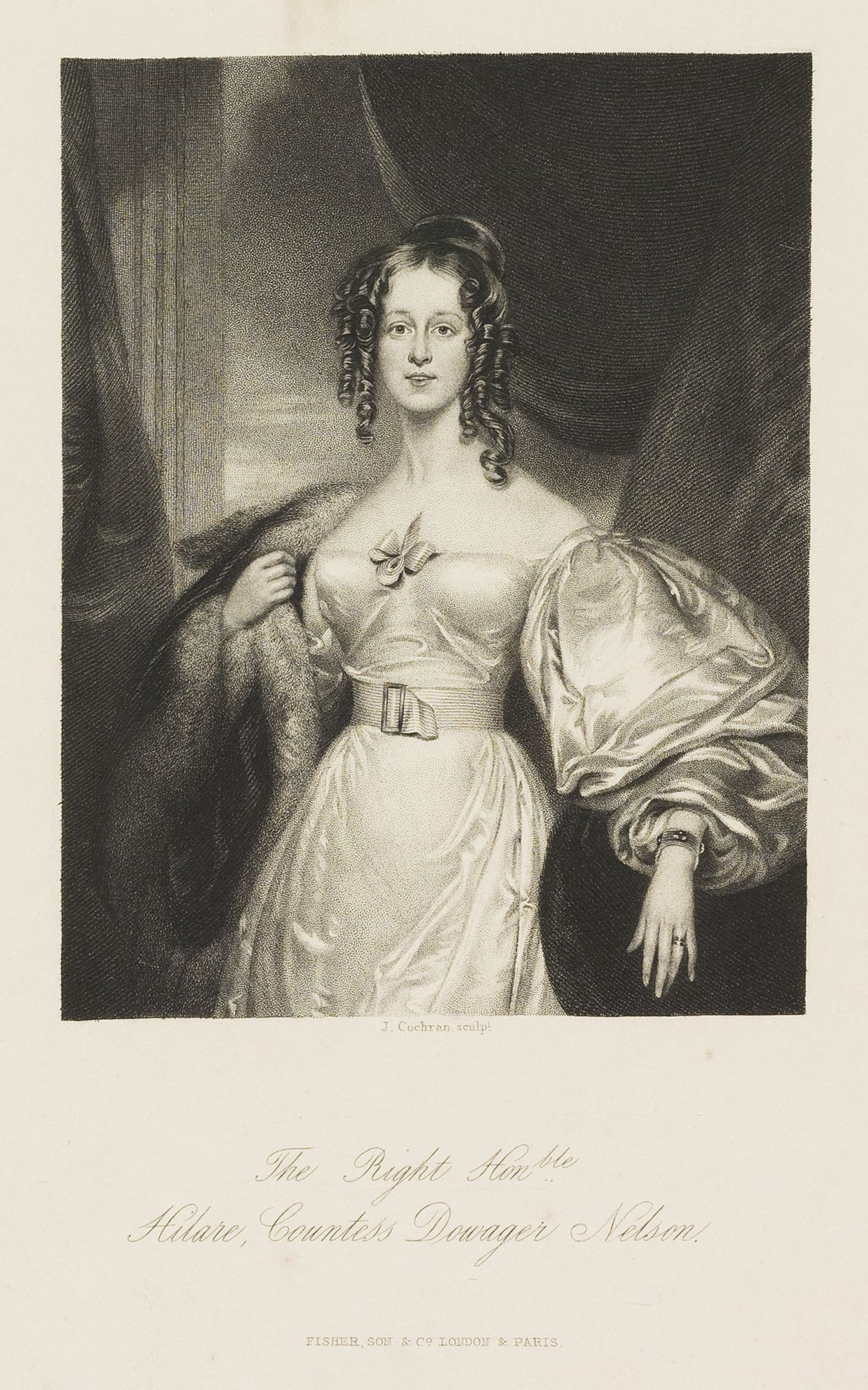
Hilare, Countess Dowager Nelson

Nelson married firstly Sarah Yonge, daughter of Rev. Henry Yonge, on 9 November 1786. They had two children:

- Charlotte Mary Nelson (1787–1873), 3rd Duchess of Bronte, married Samuel Hood, 2nd Baron Bridport
- Horatio Nelson (1788–1808), styled Viscount Merton and Viscount Trafalgar

After Sarah's death on 13 April 1828, at the age of 71, Nelson married the much younger Hilare Barlow, daughter of Admiral Sir Robert Barlow, on 26 March 1829.

Peerage of the United Kingdom
New creation	Earl Nelson; 1805–1835	Succeeded by Thomas Nelson
Preceded by Horatio Nelson	Baron Nelson; 1805–1835	Succeeded by Thomas Nelson
Titles of nobility
Preceded by Horatio Nelson	Duke of Bronte (of the Kingdom of the Two Sicilies); 1805–1835	Succeeded by Charlotte Hood
