= Trafalgar House =

Trafalgar House may refer to:

- Trafalgar House (company), a defunct British conglomerate
- Trafalgar House (Wiltshire), a country house in Wiltshire, England associated with the Earl Nelson family.
- Trafalgar House, Cottesloe, a State Register of Heritage Place in Cottesloe, Western Australia
