= Peter Nelson, 9th Earl Nelson =

British earl

The 9th Earl Nelson

Peter John Horatio Nelson, 9th Earl Nelson (9 October 1941 – 28 March 2009), was a British police officer and peer. He was the oldest son of Captain John Nelson, and grandson of Edward Nelson, 5th Earl Nelson. He inherited the title in 1981 on the death of his uncle, George Nelson.

Lord Nelson was born at Sherborne in Dorset and was brought up in Norwich on his father's poultry farm and in Norfolk. He was educated at St Joseph's College, Ipswich. He was an apprentice in the RAF and in agricultural college. He later joined the Metropolitan Police serving as a CID officer. He later served in the Hertfordshire police. He retired in 1983 at the rank of detective sergeant.

A 1981 interview with Lord Nelson stated:

"“If there were an estate to inherit, I would never be doing this”, Lord Nelson admits of his work as a police officer. “But that’s the way the cookie crumbles, as they say in America.” He adds philosophically, “Everyone has two names, and I’ve got a few more. There’s nothing I can do about it. I am now the Rt. Hon. Earl Nelson.”

Peter’s wife, Countess Maureen, is a 33-year-old assistant to an accountant. Deborah, 7, now has a vague sense that she’s a lady; and Simon, 10, knows that he’s a viscount. “The first day back at school Simon got teased”, says Peter. “But the second day he was a hero when I appeared on a children’s news programme.”

Peter, a longtime student of his ancestor’s exploits, gives occasional lectures on the Admiral’s life. As the third-ranking nobleman in his county, the Earl has also inherited a heavy schedule of charity events, but won’t sit in the House of Lords: “It’s not compatible with my police work.” Still, some ambiguity pervades his role at the station house. “Address me as always”, he reassured his superiors. But he is aware that while they outrank him professionally, they fall well below him socially. “It’s difficult for me to divorce my other self at work”, he says. “But I know it’s a hereditary title - it wasn’t given to me because I’m the savior of mankind. It won’t change me overnight. At least I hope it doesn’t."

Lord Nelson, as part of the House of Lords Act 1999, lost his seat in the House of Lords. He served as chairman of Retainacar (now Retainagroup), a company specialising in car security systems and as president of the Royal Navy Commando Association and of the Nelson Society.

The 9th Earl Nelson is survived by his son Simon John Horatio Nelson, the 10th Earl.

Peerage of the United Kingdom
Preceded by George Nelson	Earl Nelson; 1981–2009	Succeeded by Simon Nelson
