= Clearbury Down =

Protected area in Wiltshire, England

Coordinates: 51.01518°N 1.78469°W

Clearbury Down (grid reference SU152240) is a 13.3 hectare biological Site of Special Scientific Interest in Wiltshire, England. It is above the village of Charlton-All-Saints in the parish of Downton, south of Salisbury.

The site was notified in 1971.

== See also ==
- Clearbury Ring

== Sources ==
- Natural England citation sheet for the site (accessed 11 August 2006)
