= HMS Ganges (1821) =

Ship of the line of the Royal Navy

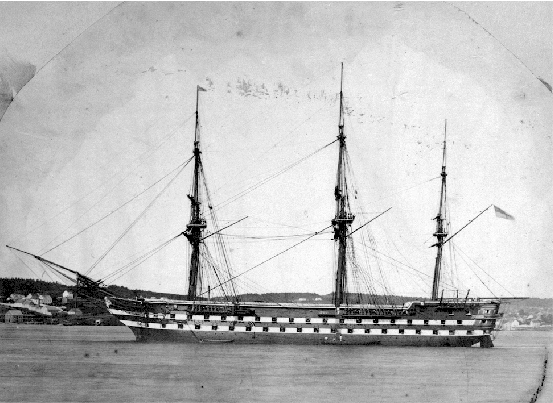
- HMS Ganges at anchor in Victoria, British Columbia

History

United Kingdom
- Name: HMS Ganges
- Ordered: 4 June 1816
- Builder: Jamsetjee Bomanjee Wadia, Bombay Dockyard
- Laid down: May 1819
- Launched: 10 November 1821
- Renamed: 1906, HMS Tenedos III; 1910, HMS Indus V; 1922, HMS Impregnable III
- Fate: Broken up, 1930

General characteristics
- Class & type: Canopus-class ship of the line
- Tons burthen: 2284 bm
- Length: 193 ft 10 in (59.08 m) (gundeck)
- Beam: 52 ft 4 1/2 in (16.0 m)
- Depth of hold: 22 ft 6 in (6.86 m)
- Sail plan: Full-rigged ship
- Armament: 84 guns: Gundeck: 28 × 32 pdrs, 2 × 68 pdr carronades; Upper gundeck: 32 × 24 pdrs; Quarterdeck: 6 × 24 pdrs, 10 × 32 pdr carronades; Forecastle: 2 × 24 pdrs, 4 × 32 pdr carronades

HMS Ganges was an 84-gun second-rate ship of the line of the Royal Navy, launched on 10 November 1821 at Bombay Dockyard, constructed from teak. She was the last sailing ship of the Navy to serve as a flagship, and was the second ship to bear the name.

Admiralty orders of 4 June 1816 directed her to be built as a facsimile of HMS Canopus (the ex-French ship Franklin, which had fought at the Battle of the Nile). Building began in May 1819, under the direction of master shipbuilder Jamsetjee Bomanjee Wadia.

When HMS Liverpool was paid off at Bombay in January 1822, Liverpool's captain, Francis Augustus Collier, and his officers and crew transferred to the newly built Ganges and sailed her back to Spithead, arriving on 6 October 1822.

Ganges was commissioned at Portsmouth in 1823, and served in several locations over the following decades. Notable events included a period as flagship of the South America Station for three years, during which she landed Royal Marines in Rio de Janeiro after a mutiny by Brazilian soldiers. She also saw action in the Mediterranean from 1838 to 1840, bombarding Beirut and blockading Alexandria. She was paid off during the Crimean War, and saw no action.

From 1857 to 1861, she was the flagship of the Pacific Station, based at Valparaíso, Chile under the command of Rear admiral Robert Lambert Baynes. She spent considerable time addressing the San Juan Boundary Dispute from the Esquimalt Royal Navy Dockyard at the Colony of Vancouver Island after which she returned to England to be converted into a training ship; she began service as the training ship HMS Ganges in 1865 at Mylor Harbour, near Falmouth; in 1899, she was moved to Harwich.

In 1905, she became part of RNTE (Royal Naval Training Establishment) Shotley, which also included the ships HMS Caroline and HMS Boscawen III.

She was renamed Tenedos III in 1906, then moved to Devonport to become part of the training establishment HMS Indus; on 13 August 1910, she was renamed Indus V. In October 1922, she was renamed Impregnable III and transferred to the training establishment HMS Impregnable, also at Devonport. She was finally taken out of service in 1923, and transferred to the dockyard; in 1929, she was sold for breaking up. The following year, after over a century in service, she was finally broken up at Plymouth.

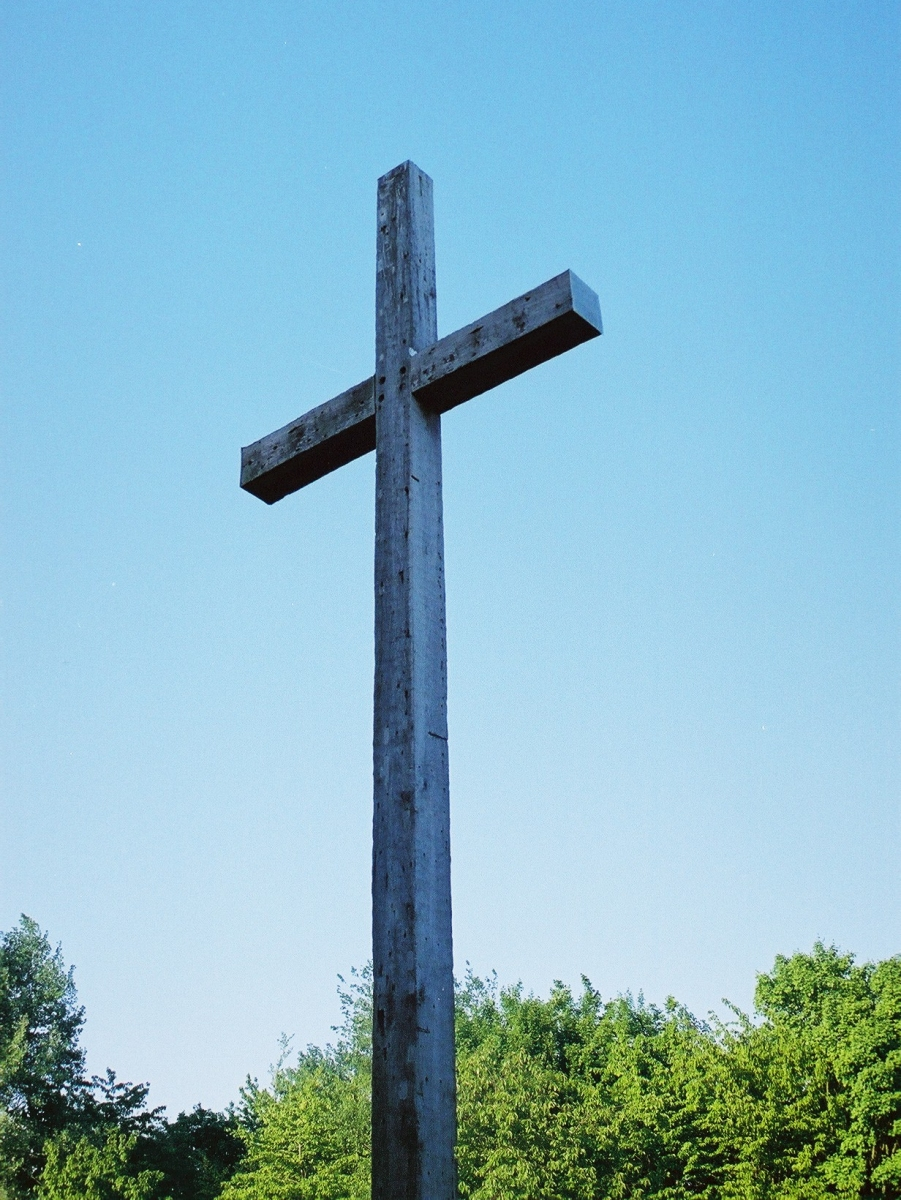
The Guildford Cathedral cross

Upon breaking, some of the timber was used to make souvenirs, usually having a small brass plaque with some of the ship's history attached.

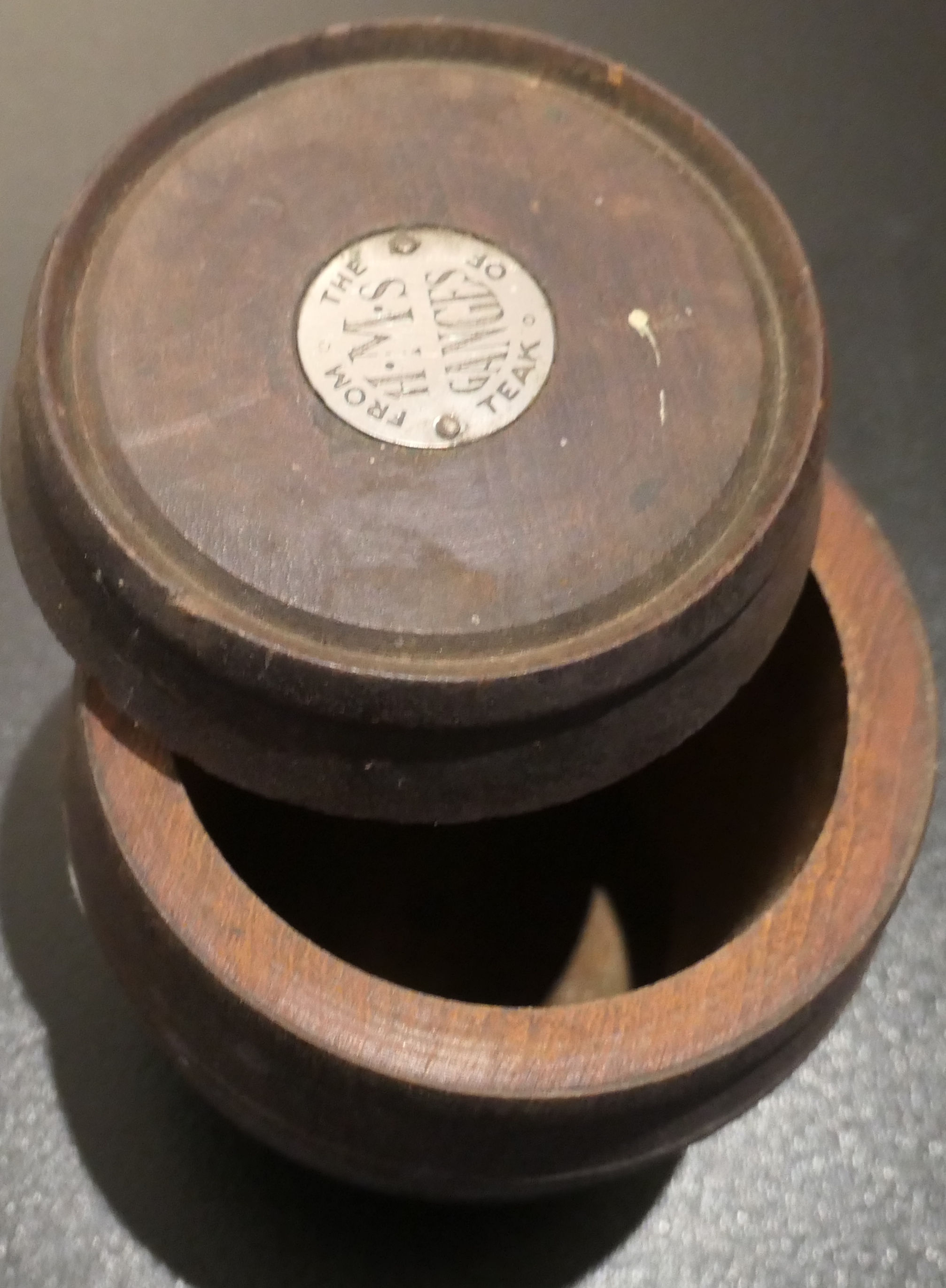
Souvenir made from teak of the Ganges

The panelling in the captain's cabin was purchased by Thomas Nelson, 4th Earl Nelson, who installed it in the principal top-floor room at Trafalgar Park in Wiltshire. The captain's cabin in the stern was used in the construction of the Burgh Island Hotel in Devon, where it remains to this day. In 1933, timbers from the ship were also used to construct the cross that stands outside the eastern end of Guildford Cathedral in Surrey.

The town of Ganges, British Columbia, on Salt Spring Island, and the adjacent waters of Ganges Harbour are named after HMS Ganges. In addition, the transom board of one of HMS Ganges' ship's boats has pride of place in Centennial Park in the town of Ganges. The community of Vesuvius Bay, also on Saltspring Island, was named after HMS Vesuvius, which, with Ganges, was also assigned to the Pacific Station.

The ship's badge has been adopted by the Saltspring Island Sailing Club, and the badge's distinctive elephant is the key symbol in the club's burgee.
