= Witherington =

Coordinates: 51.022°N 1.740°W

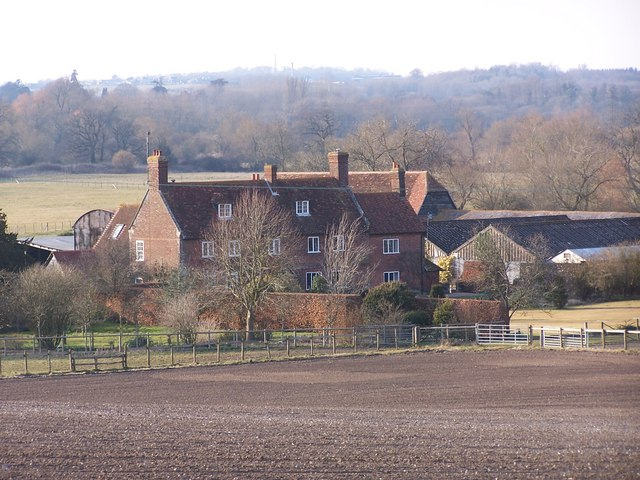
- Witherington Farm

- Location within Wiltshire
- OS grid reference: SU183248
- Civil parish: Downton
- Unitary authority: Wiltshire
- Ceremonial county: Wiltshire
- Region: South West
- Country: England
- Sovereign state: United Kingdom
- Post town: SALISBURY
- Postcode district: SP5
- Police: Wiltshire
- Fire: Dorset and Wiltshire
- Ambulance: South Western
- UK Parliament: Salisbury

Witherington is a small settlement in Wiltshire, England, in the extreme south-east of the county, a tithing of the civil parish of Downton.

Although surveyed in the Domesday Book in the 11th century, it is now little more than one farm. The farmhouse, built about 1700, is a Grade II listed building.

By 1147 there was probably a church at Witherington, dependent on Downton. As the population declined it was abandoned, probably in the 15th century.

When civil parishes were created in 1897, the tithing was part of the parish of Standlynch with Charlton All Saints. This parish was united with Downton in 1934.

== See also ==
- HMS Witherington (D76)
