= George Nelson, 8th Earl Nelson =

British peer (1905–1981)

The 8th Earl Nelson on board HMS Victory in 1973

George Joseph Horatio Nelson, 8th Earl Nelson (20 April 1905 – 21 September 1981), was a British peer and businessman. He inherited the title in 1972 on the death of his older brother Henry Nelson, 7th Earl Nelson.

Lord Nelson was born in Appleby Magna in Leicestershire, the fourth son of Edward Nelson, 5th Earl Nelson, and Geraldine (née Cave). He was the younger brother of both The 6th Earl Nelson and The 7th Earl Nelson.

George Nelson was educated at Ampleforth College in England and was registered as a Member of the Institute of Chartered Accountants in England and Wales (A.C.A.). In 1973 he was a pub landlord when he was invited by the Royal Navy to visit his ancestor's flagship HMS Victory at Portsmouth Harbour. On hearing he had never been aboard a battleship the Navy took him down the Solent on one. He married Winifred Mary Bevan, Countess Nelson, in 1945. Their daughter Lady Sarah Mary Josephine Nelson was born in 1947. She could not succeed to the title on the death of her father in 1981 aged 76, so it passed to her cousin, Peter Nelson.

Peerage of the United Kingdom
Preceded by Henry Nelson	Earl Nelson; 1972–1981	Succeeded by Peter Nelson
