= Thomas Nelson, 2nd Earl Nelson =

British earl (1786–1835)

Thomas Nelson, 2nd Earl Nelson, born Thomas Bolton (7 July 1786 – 1 November 1835), was the 2nd Earl Nelson.

He was the son of Thomas Bolton of Wells, Norfolk, and Susannah Nelson, daughter of the Rev. Edmund Nelson. He was educated at Norwich High School and from 1807 at Peterhouse, Cambridge, graduating MA in 1814. He was the nephew of Admiral Horatio Nelson.

He married Frances Elizabeth Eyre, daughter of John Maurice Eyre of Landford, Wiltshire, on 21 February 1821. They had eight children:

- Horatio Nelson, 3rd Earl Nelson (1823–1913)
- John Horatio Nelson (1825–1917)
- Lady Frances Catherine Nelson (1826–1877)
- Elizabeth Anne Nelson (1827–1830)
- Caroline Bolton (1828–1829)
- Lady Susannah Nelson (1829– 8 April 1900); who married in 1865 the Rev. Canon Blunt.
- Rear-Admiral Maurice Horatio Nelson (2 January 1832 – 6 September 1914)
- Edward Foyle Nelson (1833–1859)
- Henry Nelson (1835–1863)

He was High Sheriff of Wiltshire in 1834.

He inherited the title of Earl Nelson of Trafalgar and of Merton from his uncle William Nelson, 1st Earl Nelson, who died on 28 February 1835 without surviving male issue. Bolton changed his name to Nelson on inheriting the earldom, but died later that year. He died at Brickworth House, Downton, Wiltshire, on 1 November 1835 and was buried at Standlynch Chapel on 9 November. Frances outlived him by more than forty years and died in 1878 at Trafalgar Park, Wiltshire.

His sister Catherine married Captain Sir William Bolton.

Peerage of the United Kingdom
Preceded by William Nelson	Earl Nelson; 1835	Succeeded by Horatio Nelson
