= Church of St Laurence, Downton =

Coordinates: 50.9937°N 1.7432°W

Church of St Laurence
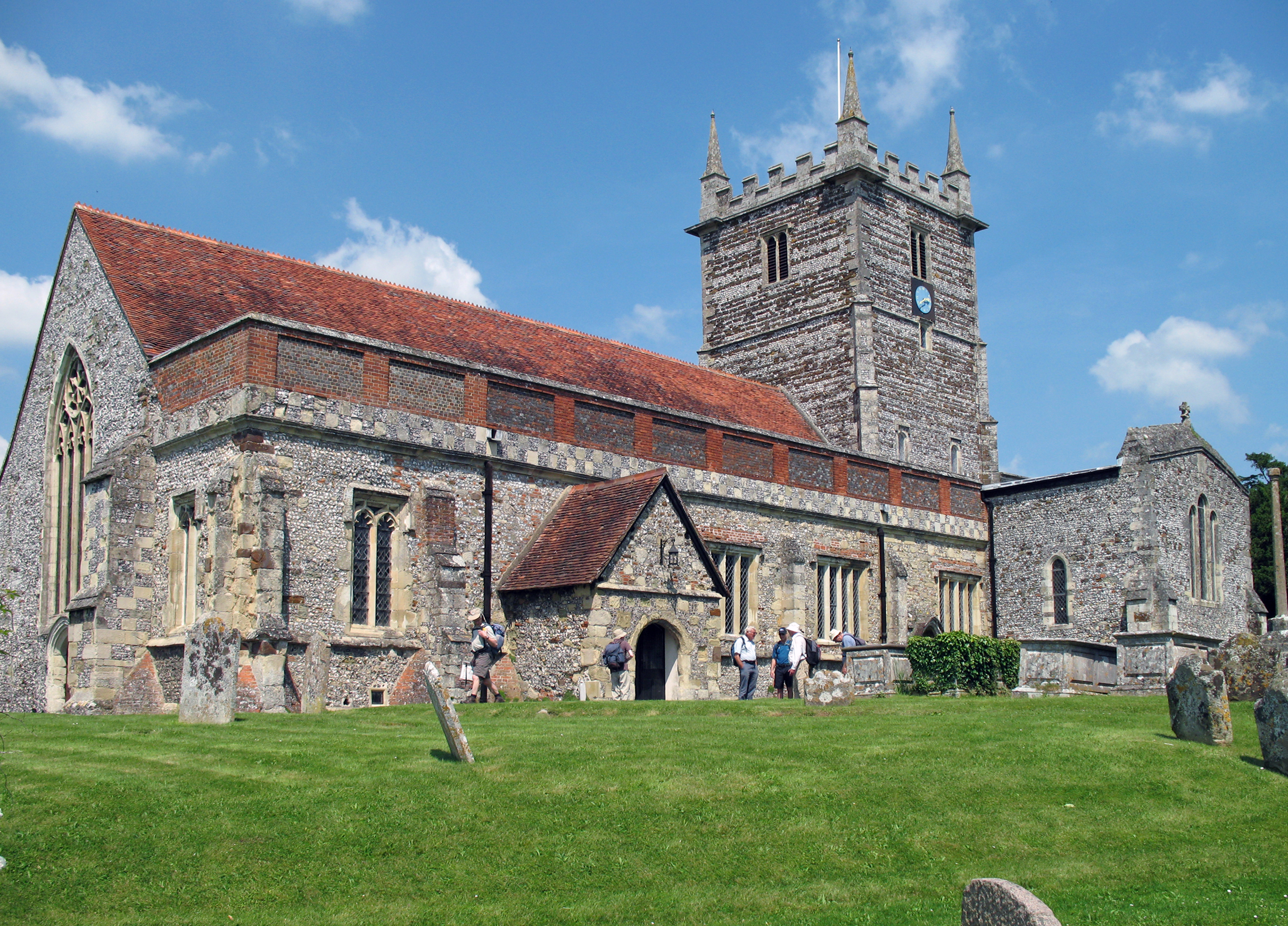
- St Laurence's Church from the south-west

- Location in Wiltshire
- Location: Downton, Wiltshire, England
- Denomination: Church of England

History
- Status: Parish church
- Dedication: Laurence of Rome

Architecture
- Functional status: Active
- Heritage designation: Grade I
- Designated: 23 March 1960
- Architects: D. A. Alexander; T. H. Wyatt
- Style: Romanesque, Early English, Decorated Gothic, Perpendicular Gothic, Gothic Revival
- Years built: 1147-1860

Specifications
- Length: 169 ft (52 m)

Administration
- Province: Canterbury
- Diocese: Salisbury
- Archdeaconry: Sarum
- Deanery: Alderbury
- Benefice: Forest and Avon
- Parish: Downton

The Church of St Laurence is the main Church of England parish church for the village of Downton, Wiltshire, England. An unusually long building for a village church, the present structure dates from 1147. Continually altered and enlarged until the mid-19th century, the church displays every style of architecture from the Norman to Victorian eras, and has been designated a Grade I listed building.

The church building is notable for showing the evolution of the dominant architectural styles used in Britain, from the Norman work in the nave to late Gothic work in the tower and chancel; numerous and high quality monuments, and a surviving 14th-century priests' doorway. Despite the small size of the village, the building is the fourth-largest medieval parish church (by area) in the county, surpassed only by St Thomas, Salisbury; St Andrew, Chippenham; and the remains of Malmesbury Abbey.

== History ==
=== Early church ===
The earliest records of a church at Downton comes from the Saxon era, when the village was owned by the Bishops of Winchester, who built a manor house here. The church and village are mentioned as being owned by the bishopric in the Domesday Book. This early structure, of which there are no visible remains, was the parish church for a wide area, including not just Downton, but some 5,700 hectares (22 sq mi) of land along the Hampshire-Wiltshire border.

This early church served several villages and was served by more than one priest; given its status, it may have been founded as a Saxon minster, funded and endowed by Winchester Cathedral. Though there are no visible remains of this church, it was likely built to a cruciform plan, similar to the surviving Saxon St Mary's Church, Breamore, Hampshire, some 2 miles to the south-west.

==== 12th and 13th centuries ====
In 1147, the nave of the Saxon building was extended to the west with three new Romanesque-style bays, construction lasting into the later part of that century. This was followed c.1200 with the demolition of the Saxon building almost in its entirety, and its replacement with an Early English-style structure. This building work included extending the 1147 nave to the east with two further bays, the construction of transepts and a low central tower. This work forms the core of the present building, though much of it has since been altered.

==== 14th and 15th centuries ====
During the 14th century, the building again underwent a significant period of expansion and alteration. The chancel was built or rebuilt from 1346 to 1352 in the Decorated Gothic style, the tower raised by a further storey and the nave extended with the addition of aisles. The chancel was built on an unusually large scale and separated from the rest of the church by a screen, likely to accommodate the Bishops of Winchester. Much of this work may have been funded by the College of St Mary in Winchester, to which the church was granted in 1382.

In the 15th century, the transepts were increased in height, the pitch of the roof lowered and the side walls raised. The window tracery in the nave was also altered at this time and a door was inserted below the west window.

==== Later history ====
The church underwent the first in a series of major restorations in 1648, when the south aisle was rebuilt in facsimile, including the porch. One of the most significant events in this period occurred in 1791 when Jacob Pleydell-Bouverie, 2nd Earl of Radnor, funded the heightening of the tower by some 30 feet (9.1 m), so he could see it more clearly from his home at the nearby Longford Castle. This work included the construction of an additional storey topped by a new parapet, with heavy battlements and corner pinnacles. The tower arches had not been constructed with this extra stage in mind, so had to be heavily braced and buttressed, mutilating their appearance.

From 1812 to 1815, the church underwent further restoration and alteration by Daniel Asher Alexander, who added an unusual brick parapet to the top of the south aisle. The church was restored on a much larger scale by Thomas Henry Wyatt in 1860, which involved removing the partition between the nave and chancel, lowering the tower to its pre-1791 height (but keeping the Earl's battlements) and the replacement of much of the windows and tracery.

The last major alterations to the building were the addition of a reredos in 1883 in memory of the previous vicar, Canon Richard Payne, the addition of a lych gate in 1892, and the restoration of the east window between 1896 and 1901 by Edward Frampton of London.

== Architecture ==
=== Plan ===
The building is constructed and designed in the traditional cruciform layout, with an aisled five-bay nave, transepts, central tower and chancel. The building is unusually large for a village church, at 169 feet (52 m) in length and with an area of 862 square metres (9,280 sq ft); consequently, the Church of England classify it as a "large sized" church building.

=== Exterior ===
The west wall of the nave features a large four-light Decorated Gothic window of the Geometrical period (1245–1315) above a Tudor-arched moulded doorway. The nave aisles feature two-light and three-light windows with chamfers and hoodmoulds, the 17th-century south porch with Tudor-arched doorway sits between the 2nd and 3rd bays. The nave is constructed primarily from flint, with a later brick parapet and limestone for dressings.

The transepts, both 13th-century, are formed of two bays each, though only the outermost bay projects beyond the aisle walls. The south transept has angle buttresses, a triplet of lancet windows to its gable, a single lancet to the west and a two-light Perpendicular window to the east with a cartouche dated 1743. The north transept has a two-light Perpendicular window to the gable and a lancet to the west. The north aisle has a catslide roof that continues over the main nave aisle and finishes at the north transept.

To the east of the transepts is the chancel, formed of three bays. The south and north sides of the chancel have three two-light Geometrical windows, separated by buttresses. The eastern gable has a large 19th-century five-light window in the Geometrical style with a hoodmould and diagonal buttresses. The north side also has a pointed doorway with continuous moulding and adjoins an octagonal stair turret in its western corner.

The central tower of the church is formed of two stages, dating from the 12th and 13th, and 15th centuries respectively. The tower, built of flint and limestone bands, has two small round-headed arched windows south face of the lower stage, that of the east and west faces being blocked by the roof. The north face has a similar round-headed window in its lower face, but only a single opening in the centre of the tower. The overlap between the first and second stages of the tower features a clock face on the southern side of the tower, but is otherwise only marked by a thin sill.

The second stage of the tower has a pair of larger round headed window openings in the centre of each face, each one filled with louvre boards rather than glass. The tower is topped by a thick parapet designed by the Earl of Radnor, dating to 1791, with cornice, battlements and pinnacles. This battlement originally crowned the now-removed third stage of the tower but was placed upon the second stage when the tower was restored by Wyatt in 1860.

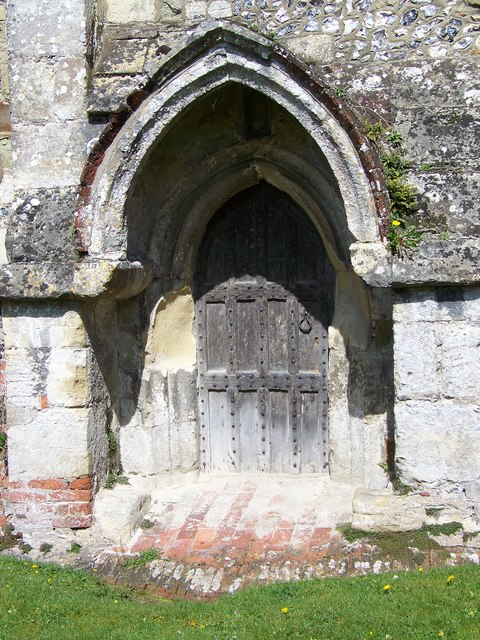
14th-century priest's doorway

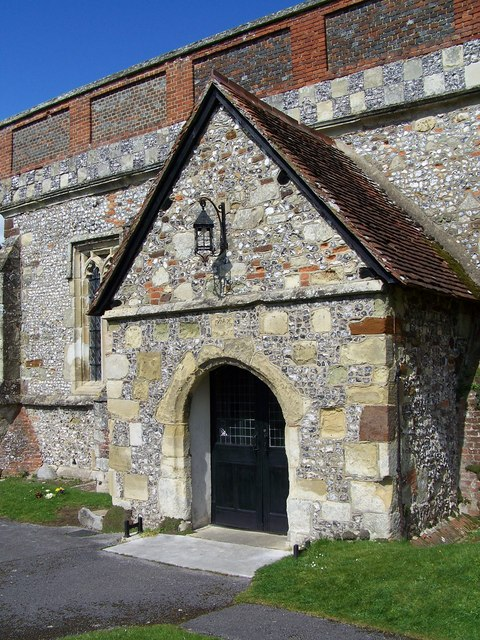
South porch (1648)

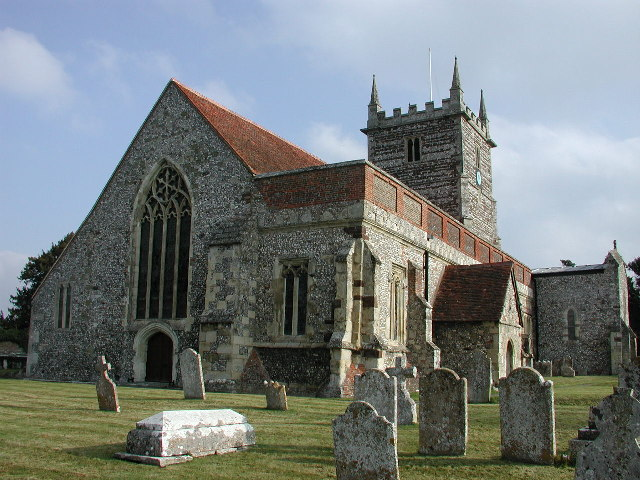
West facade

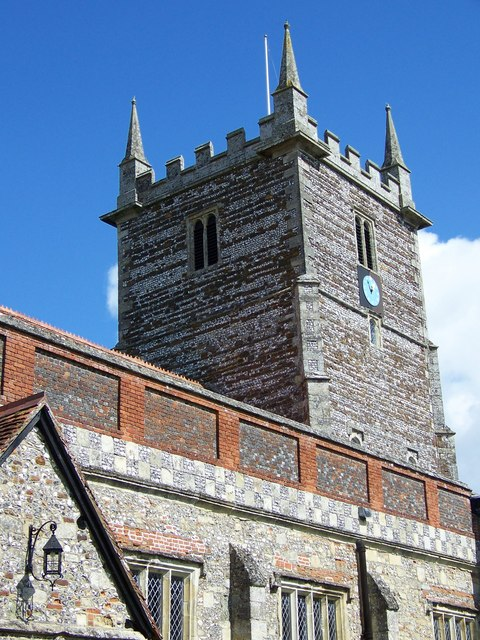
Central tower

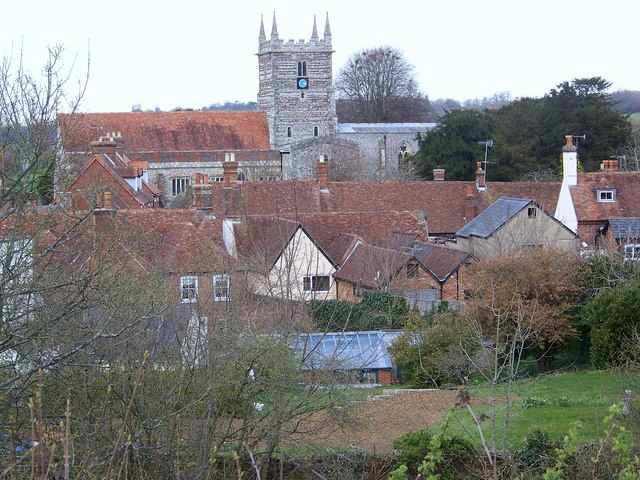
View from Moot Gardens

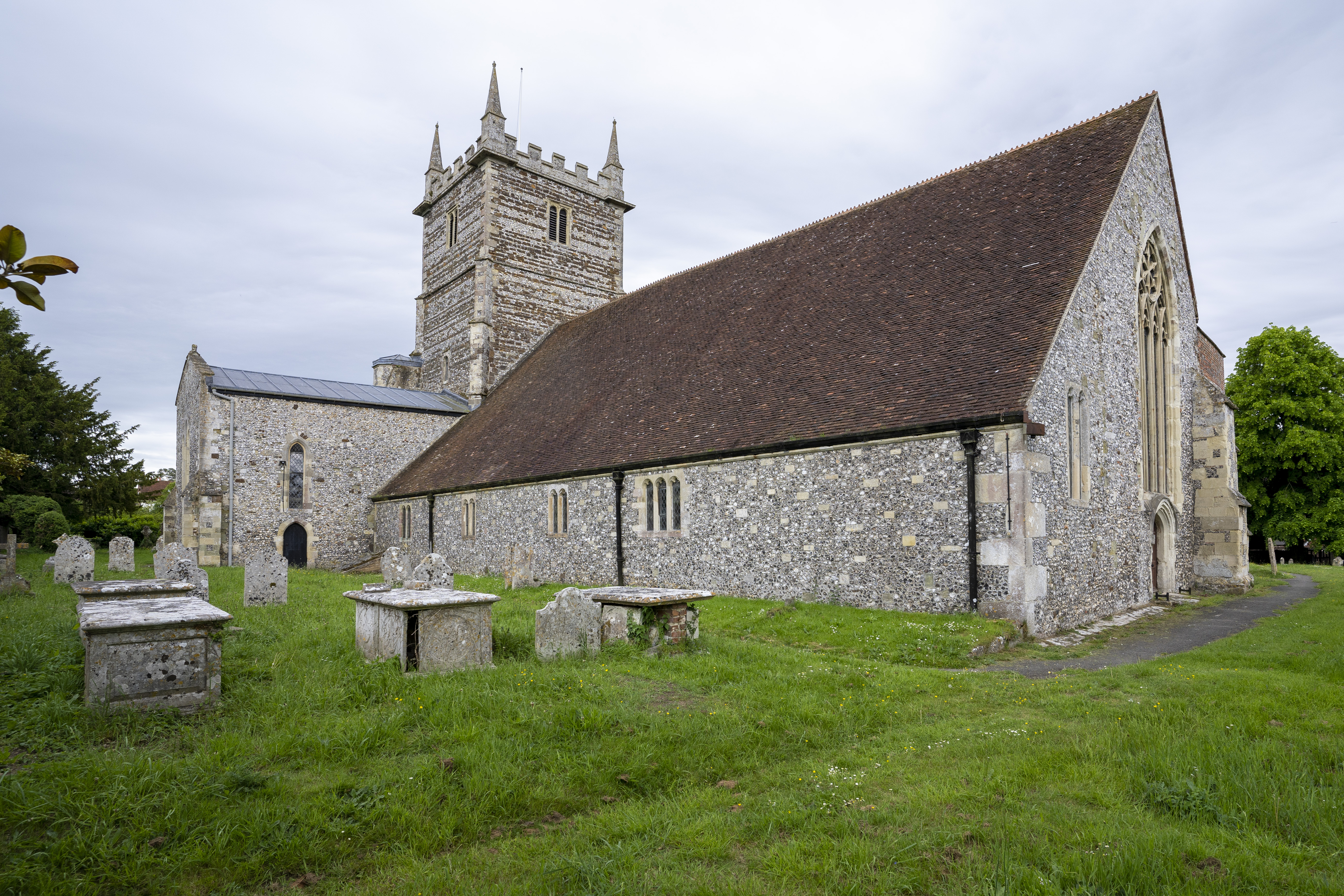
North nave aisle, showing catslide roof

=== Interior ===
The inner south doorway within the porch has a continuous moulded pointed arch and restored ledged door. The nave has three 12th-century cylindrical columns left from the 1147 rebuilding, these bays featuring scalloped capitals and pointed arches. The two easternmost bays are from the early 13th century, with taller pointed arches. The wall above the eastern arch of the nave contains a red and black-painted excerpt from Exodus chapter 20. The nave is crowned by a five bay arch-braced collar truss roof.

The crossing arches, originally dating from the early 13th century, have double-chamfered arches with fillet mouldings and stiff-leaf capitals. These arches have been much altered since their installation first with the heightening of the tower and then with its reduction 70 years later. The south transept has a medieval braced tie-beam roof, with a similar roof in the north transept. There is a trefoiled piscina on the east wall of the south transept and a hagioscope on the north wall.

The chancel, which is often considered the finest part of the building, has a 19th-century tie-beam roof on foliated corbels; the corbels may have originally supported a stone vault. The chancel also contains a 14th-century sedilia with a more recently restored canopy, an ambry, and a 19th-century reredos.

==== Windows ====
With the exception of one window in the north aisle, none of the windows in the church contain any medieval glass. Many of the windows in the church are now lit with clear glass, except for the main west and east windows and a limited number in the nave, transepts and chancel. The west window contains glass from 1896 and 1907 by Edward Frampton, depicting the angels Uriel, Michael, Gabriel and Raphael. The eastern window of the south transept contains glass made by Heaton, Butler & Bayne in 1889 and 1893, illustrating the Annunciation and the Good Shepherd. The east window is the largest in the church, also by Edward Frampton, showing the Crucifixion.

==== Monuments and fittings ====
The oldest fitting in the church is the fine 13th-century font, made from Purbeck Marble, at the west end of the south nave aisle. The nave also contains a 17th-century oak chest and the remains of an 18th-century Jacobean hexagonal pulpit, now remodelled into a table. There is a wall painting on the west wall of the nave depicting the Flight into Egypt. Other notable monuments include several 18th-century marble memorials to the Barons of Downton including one to Charles Duncombe and the 19th-century reredos, which depicts the Supper at Emmaus as well as several angels.

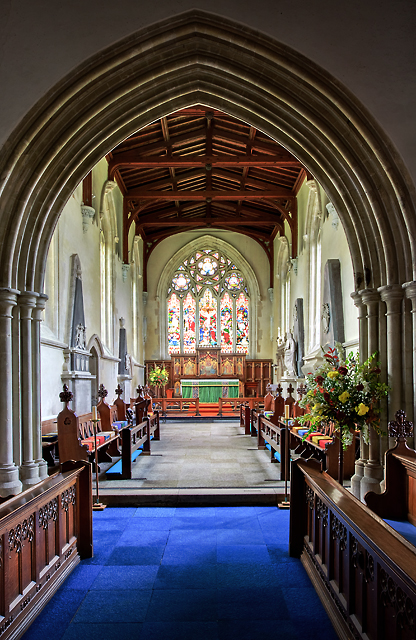
Chancel from crossing

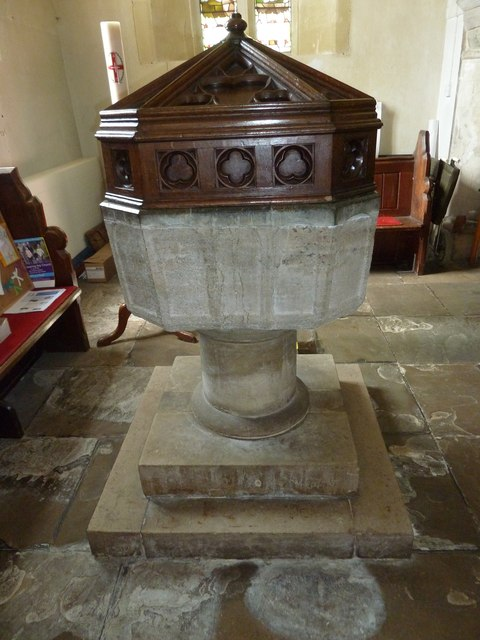
Font

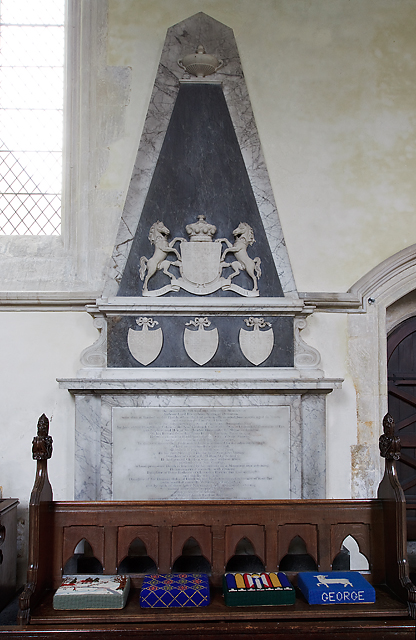
Monument to Lord Feversham

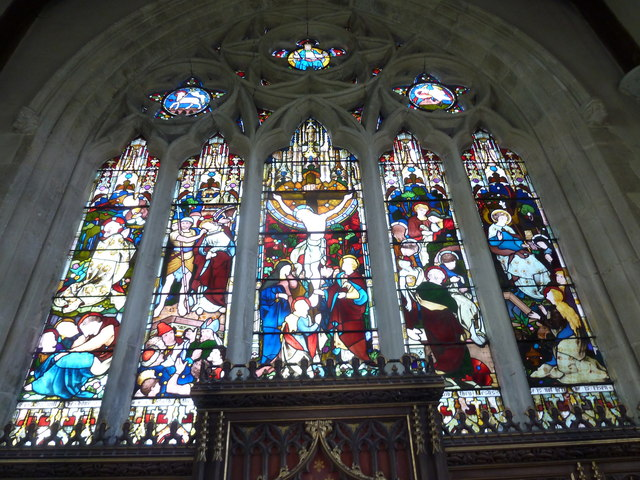
East window

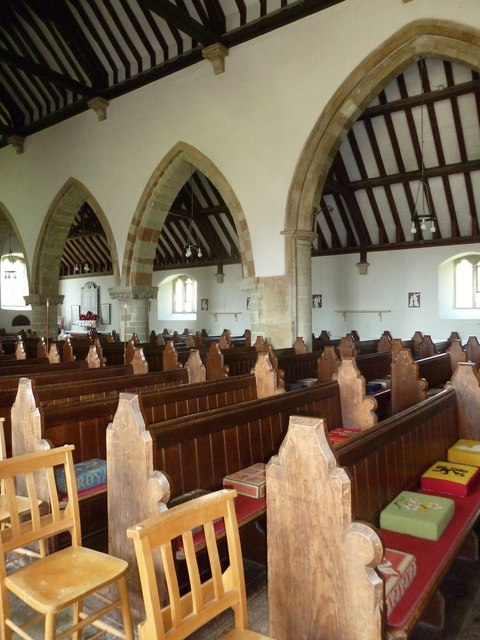
Nave and aisles

== Music ==
=== Organ ===
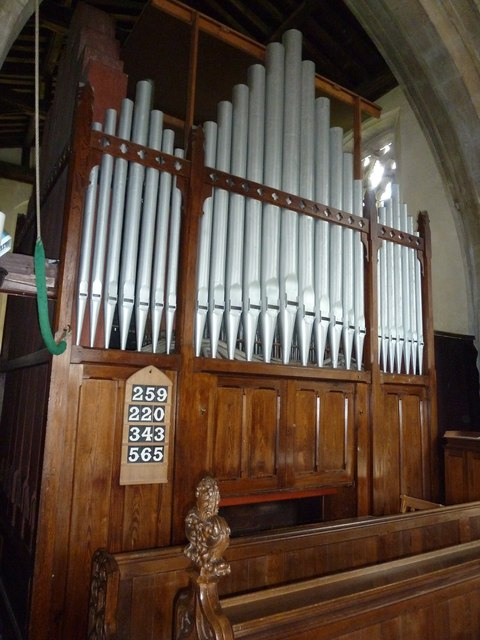
The organ case

The earliest record of an organ at the church is in 1826 when a barrel organ from Lincoln was installed in the church. This organ has only one manual and eight stops. It was replaced in 1870 by a much larger organ built by William Sweetland of Bath, formed of two manuals plus a pedalboard and 19 stops. In 1960, George Osmond & Co of Taunton renovated the organ. The organ received further attention in 1984 from Keith Scudamore of Bournemouth, who added a stop and converted the organ to electric action. The bourdon was disconnected in 2002. The organ is in the north transept and has a simple pipe rack case.

=== Bells ===
The church tower has contained at least one bell since c.1350, when an unidentified founder cast a bell weighing approximately 10 long cwt (508 kg). The bell's inscription makes no reference to who this person was, only giving a single initial 'R'.

In the 1552 Church Goods survey ordered by Edward VI, four bells are recorded at Downton, formed of the 1350 bell and three others, though the founders of these three are unknown. In 1604, John Wallis of Salisbury recast the heaviest three bells, keeping the bell made by 'R' as the treble of a ring of four. In 1692, these were augmented to five by adding a new, smaller, treble bell cast by Samuel Knight of London. No further work would take place until 1713, when Clement Tosier recast the tenor to commemorate the reign of Queen Anne.

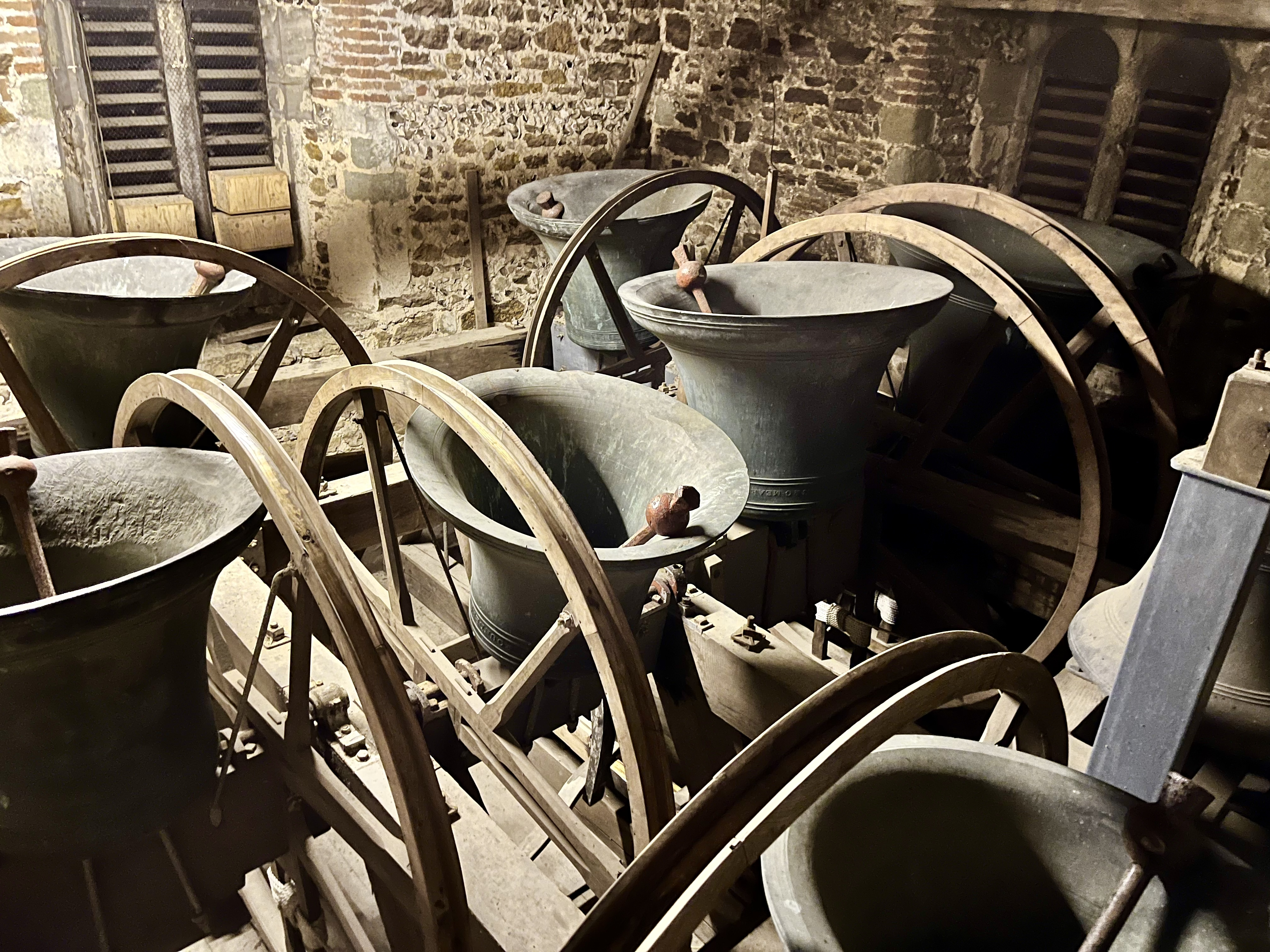
The church bells, in the inverted position

These bells were augmented to six in 1856 with a new bell cast by Charles and George Mears of Whitechapel, London. Towards the end of the 19th century and beginning of the 20th, concerns were voiced about the frame's lack of structural rigidity, so in 1908, the old frame was removed. The bells were rehung in the autumn of 1908 in a new oak frame made by Tristam and Greenleaf of Hereford for eight bells, giving space for a future augmentation. The cost of the work was funded by public subscription. The bells were rededicated by John Wordsworth, Bishop of Salisbury, on 28 October 1908.

The Whitechapel foundry that had augmented the bells to six in 1856 returned twice in the first half of the 20th century. In 1932, the tenor cracked and was recast by the foundry, now operating under the name Mears & Stainbank. The recast tenor weighed 22 long cwt 3 qr 23 lb (2,571 lb or 1,166 kg) and strikes the note D. The tenor was rehung on new bearings and gudgeons to complete the work. Mears returned again in 1946 to fill the two empty pits in the frame, casting two new treble bells and thus augmenting the bells to eight. The new bells were provided with similar fittings to the existing six, including timber headstocks and wrought-iron clappers. Other than minor work to the bearings and gudgeons, the bells have had no major attention since.

The bell cast in 1350 is still hung in the tower today as the 5th of the ring of eight, which makes it amongst the oldest church bells in use for full circle ringing in the country. Only two other bells by this founder survive, one at St Andrew's Church in Chale, Isle of Wight; and the other at St Mary's Church in Washington, West Sussex. Both of these other two bells are substantially lighter in weight than Downton's bell, which makes it an extremely rare survivor of a 14th-century medieval bell of any significant size.

The tower also contains two smaller bells of approximately 3 long cwt (150 kg) each. One of these bells, hung on the tower roof, was cast by the Bristol foundry in 1828 and hung by John Shelley of nearby Redlynch; the other bell was cast in 1499 by the Salisbury foundry and was brought to Downton in 1996 from the church at Patney, Wiltshire, which was made redundant.

=== Clock ===
Also in the tower, in a chamber between the ringing room and the belfry, is a large turret clock of some importance. Though neither its age nor maker can be accurately ascertained, it is first mentioned in the church accounts in 1735, when Samuel Loveday Bill was paid £2 to repair the clock. The clock originally had both quarter hour and hourly strikes as well as a chiming barrel for playing tunes on the bells. The large wooden chiming barrel began to break down in the late 19th century; it was last used in 1887 and since then has been disconnected.

Other than minor maintenance work in 1872, the clock was wound daily until 1990, when it was converted to electric winding. The clock is housed in a wooden birdcage frame with iron corner posts. It has a two-train movement with a wooden pendulum, stone weights and an anchor escapement.
