= Thomas Nelson, 4th Earl Nelson =

British peer (1857–1947)

Thomas Horatio Nelson, 4th Earl Nelson (21 December 1857 – 30 September 1947), styled Viscount Merton until 1913, was a British peer, inheriting the earldom on 25 February 1913 from his father, Horatio Nelson, 3rd Earl Nelson.

Born at Trafalgar Park in Wiltshire, he was the son of Horatio Nelson, 3rd Earl Nelson of Trafalgar and of Merton and Lady Mary Jane Diana (née Agar, 1823–1904).

A Roman Catholic through his mother, Lady Mary Nelson, in 1914 he had Standlynch Church rededicated to Mary Queen of Angels and St. Michael and All the Angels, served by a resident priest. In 1930, Lord Nelson purchased the panelling of the Captain's Cabin of HMS Ganges, built in 1821, which was being broken up, installing the panelling in the main top floor room at Trafalgar Park.

During World War II the North and South Wings of Trafalgar Park, the family seat, were occupied by tenants with Thomas Nelson and his younger brother Edward Agar Nelson living in the main house. In 1946 he complained to the Attlee Government that much of the £5,000 a year pension granted to his ancestor the 1st Earl was being spent on maintaining the house. The Treasury proposed to create a Bill ending the pension but which would allow the Nelson family to sell the estate, which had been purchased with money raised by public subscription for the descendants of Horatio Nelson. The Bill ending the pension was passed in 1947 after the death of Thomas Nelson and Trafalgar Park was sold in 1948 by Edward Agar Nelson, the 5th Earl.

Thomas Nelson died in September 1947 at age 89. He never married and on his death the title passed to his younger brother Edward, the 5th Earl Nelson.

Peerage of the United Kingdom
Preceded by Horatio Nelson	Earl Nelson; 1913–1947	Succeeded by Edward Agar Nelson
