= Henry Nelson, 7th Earl Nelson =

British nobleman

Henry Edward Joseph Horatio Nelson, 7th Earl Nelson (22 April 1894 – 8 August 1972), was a British peer, having inherited the earldom in June 1957 on the death of his older brother, The 6th Earl Nelson.

Henry Nelson was born in Northampton, the son of The Hon. Edward Agar Horatio Nelson (who later succeeded as The 5th Earl Nelson in September 1948) and Geraldine (née Cave). He was educated at Downside School and Maredsous Abbey in Belgium and served in the First World War in the Australian Imperial Force and with the Merchant Navy. He also served during the Second World War, when he gained the rank of Major in the Indian Army; he never married. A tea planter at Madeira, on his death at his home in Spain the title passed to his younger brother, George Nelson, who became the 8th Earl Nelson. In his will, Lord Nelson left £13,199.

Peerage of the United Kingdom
Preceded by Albert Nelson	Earl Nelson; 1957–1972	Succeeded by George Nelson
