= Clearbury Ring =

Iron Age hillfort in Wiltshire, England

Coordinates: 51.0188°N 1.7839°W

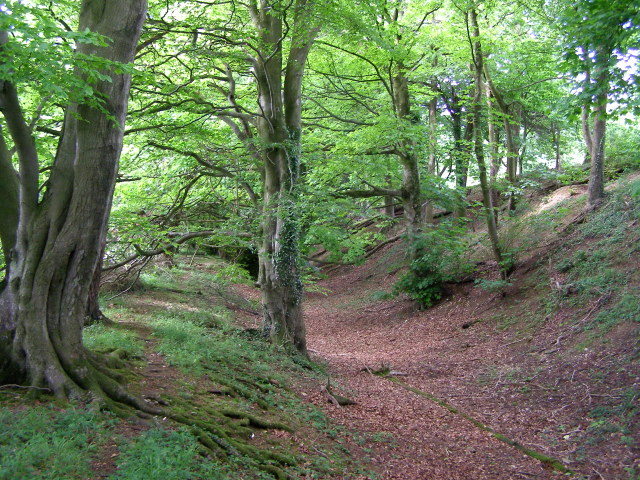
Ditch and rampart of Clearbury Ring

Clearbury Ring is a univallate Iron Age hillfort which is partly in the parish of Downton in the county of Wiltshire in south-west England, approximately 5 kilometres (3 mi) due south of Salisbury city centre. The site, which is a scheduled monument, straddles the boundary with Odstock parish, and a slight scarp runs across the interior of the fort, marking the parish boundary.

The fort occupies a prominent hilltop overlooking the valley of the River Avon, at an altitude of 142 metres (466 ft) above mean sea level. The hillfort is immediately adjacent to the Clearbury Down Site of Special Scientific Interest, but is not included within it.

Clearbury Ring encloses an area of approximately 2 hectares (4.9 acres); the rampart is well preserved and consisted of a single bank with a ditch outside it. The fort had a single entrance on the north-west side, consisting simply of a 10-metre (33 ft) wide gap with a causeway across the ditch. Traces of a quarry are evident within the fort's interior. The fort is overgrown with tree cover. In 1632, Clearbury Ring was recorded as Clereburu. A Paleolithic hand axe was found here.

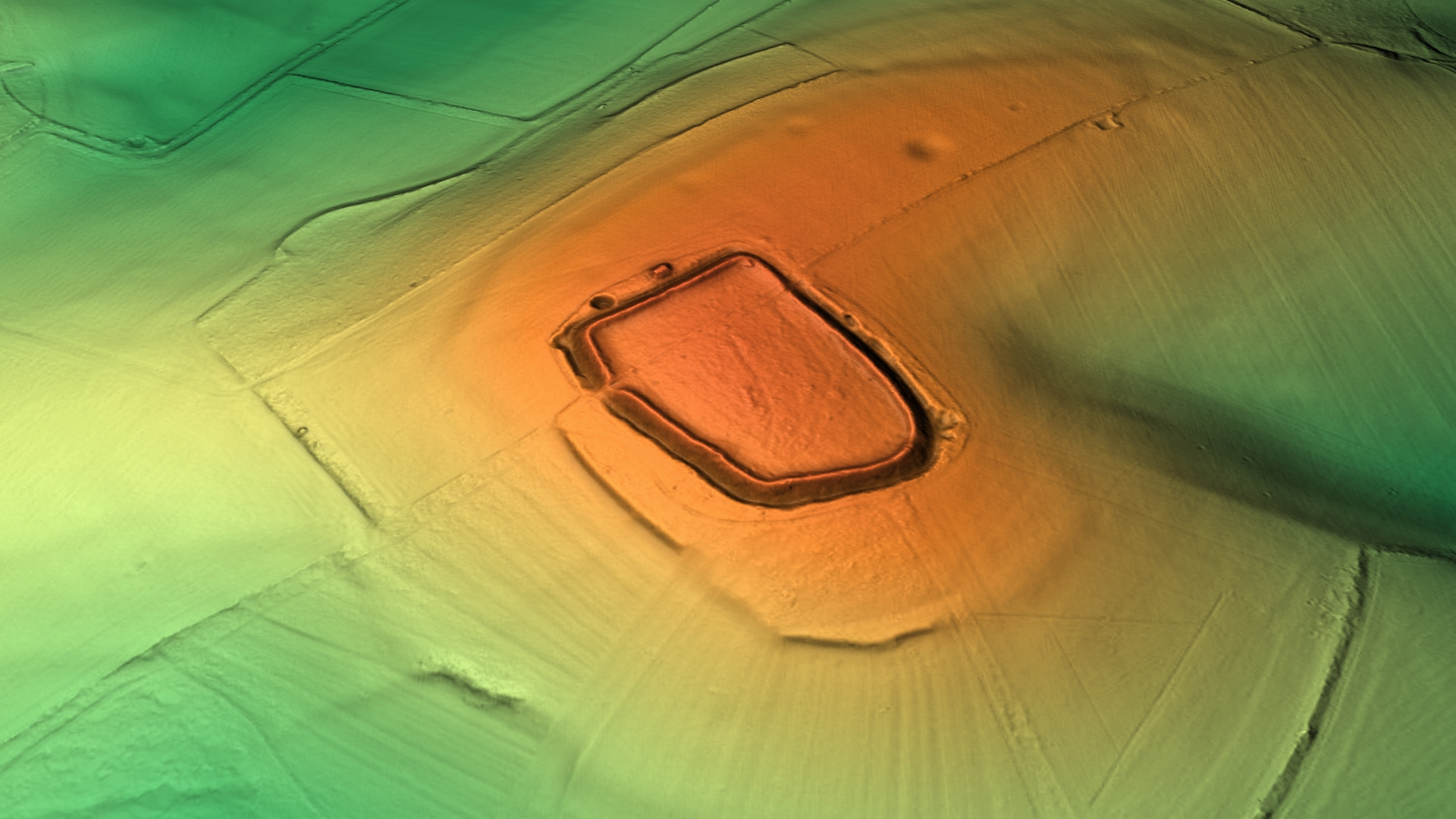
3D view of the digital terrain model

To the south-west of the fort are the remains of a lynchet, consisting of a steep 2-metre (6 ft 7 in) high scarp that runs parallel to the fort's defences. Two other lynchets have been identified near the fort, although they are not as well-preserved, together with faint traces of ancient field boundaries.
