= The Trafalgar School at Downton =

Location
- Breamore Road; Downton, Wiltshire, SP5 3HN; England; 50.9905°N 1.7563°W

Information
- Type: Academy
- Established: 1964
- Local authority: Wiltshire Council
- Trust: Magna Learning Partnership
- Department for Education URN: 144389 Tables
- Ofsted: Reports
- Headteacher: Jy Taylor
- Gender: Coeducational
- Age: 11 to 16
- Enrolment: 782 (September 2024)
- Website: www.trafalgarschool.com

The Trafalgar School at Downton is a coeducational secondary school in Downton, in the south of the English county of Wiltshire.

The school began as a secondary modern in 1964. Previously a foundation school administered by Wiltshire Council, in April 2017 The Trafalgar School converted to academy status and became part of the Magna Learning Partnership.
