= Simon Nelson, 10th Earl Nelson =

British police officer and peer

Simon John Horatio Nelson, 10th Earl Nelson (born 21 September 1971), styled Viscount Merton between 1981 and 2009, is a British police officer and peer, having succeeded as Earl Nelson on the death of his father, Peter Nelson, 9th Earl Nelson, in March 2009.

== Biography ==
Lord Nelson is the son of Peter, 9th Earl Nelson, from his first marriage to Maureen Diana Quinn.

Like his father before him, he is a serving police officer. In 1993, when he was still styled as Lord Merton, he married Ikuko Umekage (marriage dissolved 1996); in 1999 he married Anna Stekerova (born 1979) with whom he has two children: his son and heir apparent Thomas John Horatio Nelson, Viscount Merton (born 27 April 2010), and Lady Daisy Nelson (born 27 January 2006).

Peerage of the United Kingdom
Preceded by Peter Nelson	Earl Nelson; 2009-present	Incumbent
