= Charlton-All-Saints =

Hamlet in South Wiltshire, England

Coordinates: 51.016°N 1.750°W

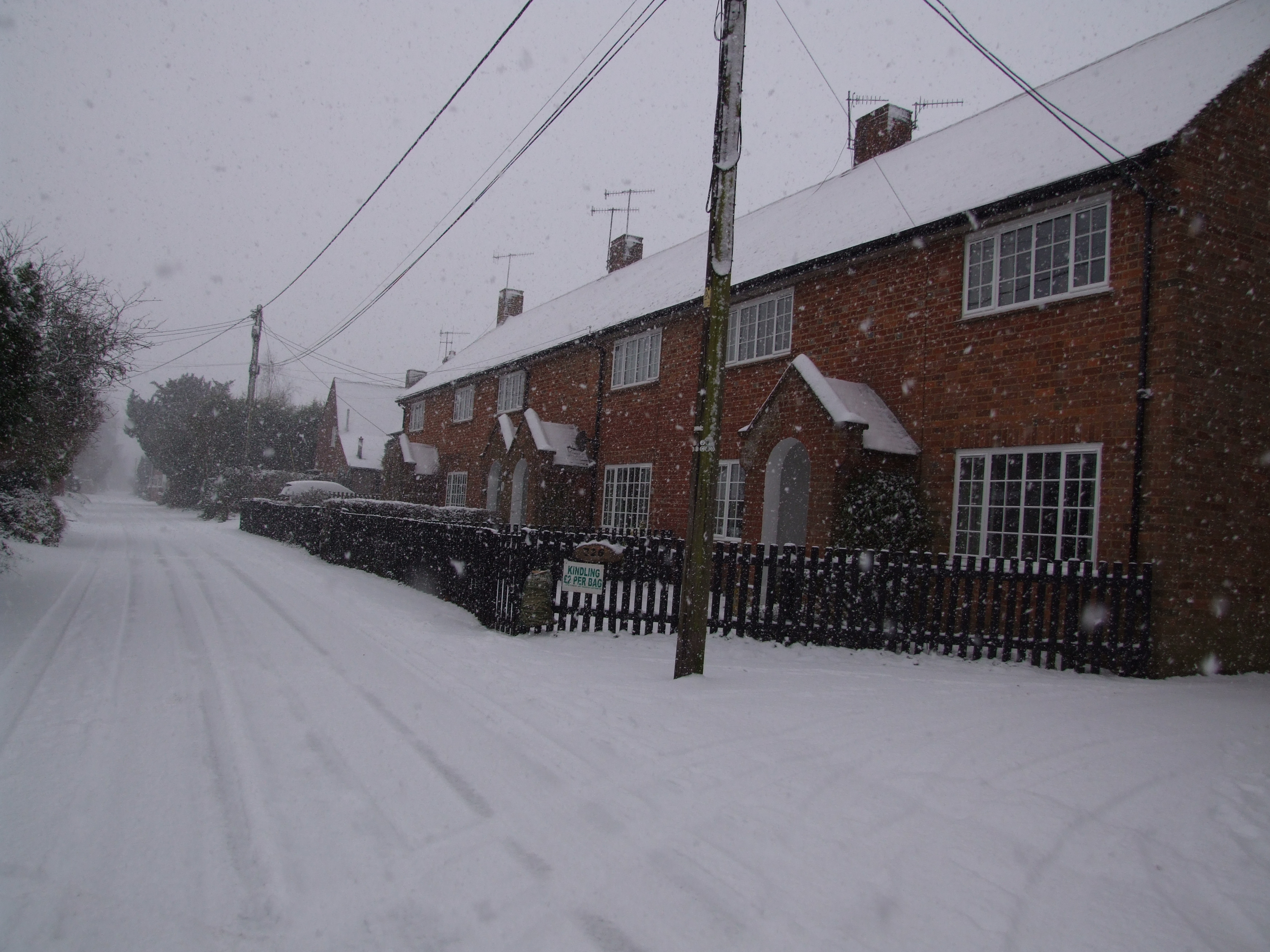
- Charlton-All-Saints in winter

- Location within Wiltshire
- OS grid reference: SU176241
- Civil parish: Downton
- Unitary authority: Wiltshire
- Ceremonial county: Wiltshire
- Region: South West
- Country: England
- Sovereign state: United Kingdom
- Post town: Salisbury
- Postcode district: SP5
- Dialling code: 01725
- Police: Wiltshire
- Fire: Dorset and Wiltshire
- Ambulance: South Western
- UK Parliament: Salisbury

Charlton-All-Saints is a hamlet in the civil parish of Downton, in South Wiltshire, England. It lies immediately west of the River Avon, about 1.5 mi (2.4 km) north of Downton village and 4 mi (6 km) south-east of the city of Salisbury.

The village has several traditional thatched cottages, of which a few are from the 17th century, and the majority mid-18th century. Charlton House, at the junction of Warrens Lane and Lower Road, has a granary and a barn from the late 18th century.

The Avon Valley Path, a long-distance footpath between Salisbury and the Dorset coast, passes through the village.

== History ==
The settlement has existed since Saxon times. The name "Charlton" derives from the Old English #eorl t#n, t#n meaning farm or settlement and #eorl being the lowest rank of free peasant in Anglo-Saxon England. The suffix "All Saints" is taken from the dedication of the village's church. Sources and road signs differ as to whether the name should be hyphenated.

By 1208, Charlton was a tithing of the parish of Downton. In the 14th century it was a prosperous farming community, highly assessed for taxation. In 1851, the Charlton and Witherington tithings were united to form an ecclesiastical parish, which then had considerable secular duties. In 1897, after the creation of civil parishes, this ecclesiastical parish was united with Standlynch to form the civil parish of Standlynch with Charlton-All-Saints. This was finally merged into Downton parish in 1934.

Charlton had a small school for girls from 1786, and a National School from c. 1858 which was designed by William Butterfield. This school could accommodate 99 but attendance fell during the 20th century and it was closed in 1968.

== Church and chapel ==
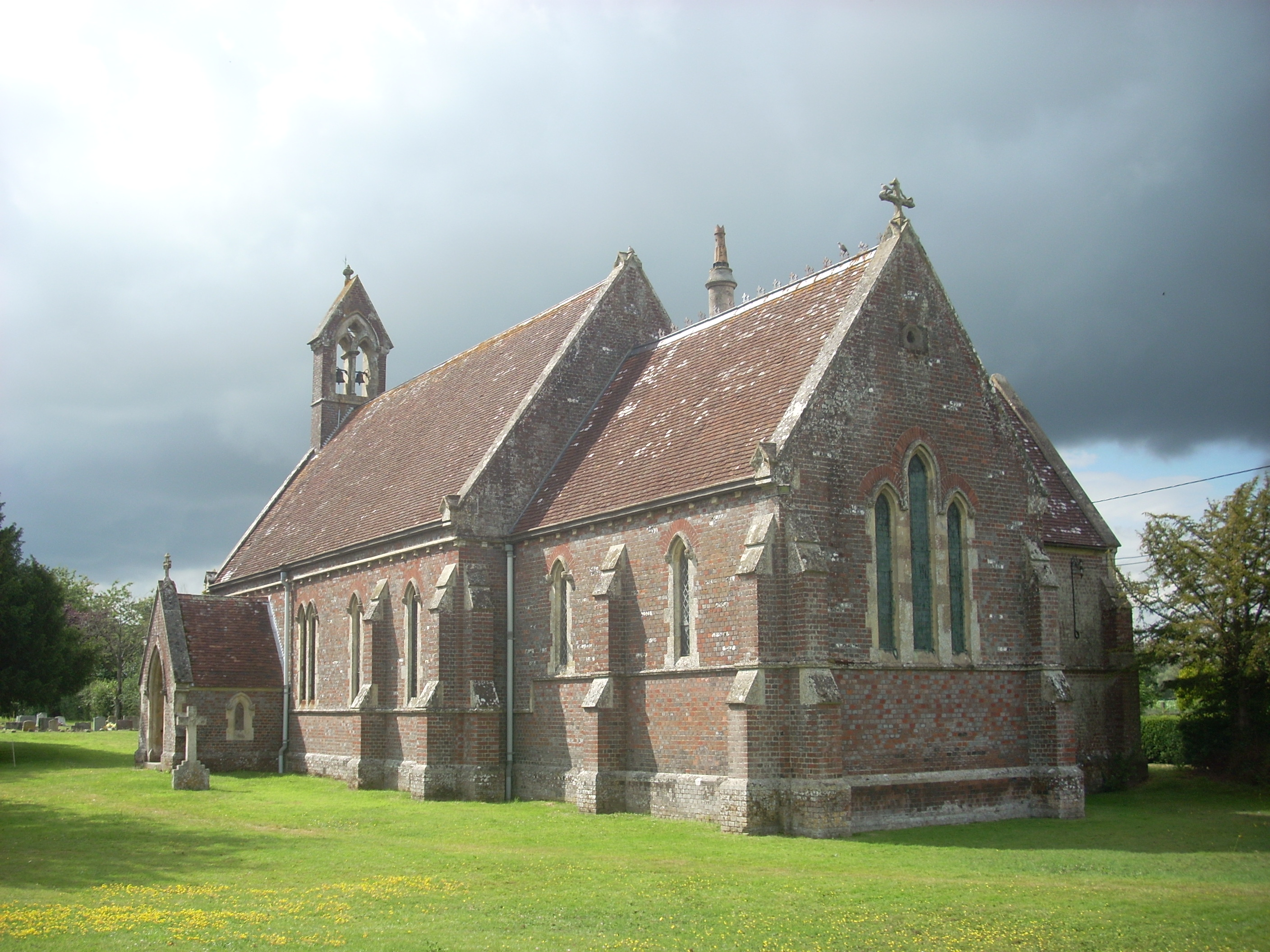
All Saints' Church

The Anglican church, All Saints', was built in 1851 partly at the expense of Lord Nelson, owner of the Trafalgar estate on the other side of the river. Construction is in brick to designs of T.H. Wyatt, in Early English style. The font is by William Butterfield and the west windows by Morris. Today the church is part of the Chalke Valley benefice.

Butterfield also designed the vicarage on Lower Road, built in brick in 1860–62.

A Wesleyan Methodist chapel was built near All Saints' in 1864, and became a private house in the 1970s.
