= Albert Nelson, 6th Earl Nelson =

Albert Francis Joseph Horatio Nelson, 6th Earl Nelson, FRGS, FRSA, FZS (2 September 1890 – 23 June 1957), styled Viscount Merton between 1947 and 1951, was a British peer. He was the great-great grand nephew of Horatio Nelson, 1st Viscount Nelson.

He was the oldest son of The Hon. Edward Nelson (who later succeeded as The 5th Earl Nelson in 1948) and Geraldine Cave; he was educated at Downside School and Maredsous Abbey. He fought in World War I in the Australian Imperial Force. A lecturer in astronomy and anthropology, he was appointed Fellow of the Royal Astronomical Society (FRAS), Fellow of the Royal Geographical Society (FRGS) and Fellow of the Royal Society of Arts (FRSA). He authored two books: Life in the Universe (1953), and There IS Life on Mars (1955).

On 16 January 1924, he married Amelia Cooper (died 1937), a Californian and widow of John C. Scott. They were divorced in 1925. In 1927, he married Marguerite Helen O'Sullivan (died 6 February 1969) in Scotland. They were married again in England in 1942. The Earl died childless in 1957 and was succeeded by his brother Henry Nelson, 7th Earl Nelson.

Peerage of the United Kingdom
Preceded by Edward Agar Nelson	Earl Nelson; 1951–1957	Succeeded by Henry Nelson
