= Edward Nelson, 5th Earl Nelson =

British peer

Edward, 5th Earl Nelson

Edward Agar Horatio Nelson, 5th Earl Nelson (10 August 1860 – 30 January 1951), was a British peer, inheriting the earldom in September 1947 from his older brother, Thomas Nelson, 4th Earl Nelson.

Born at Trafalgar Park in Wiltshire, he was the younger son of Horatio Nelson, 3rd Earl Nelson, and his wife, Lady Mary Jane Diana (née Agar). He was known as The Hon. Edward Nelson for almost all of his life, up until he became Earl Nelson in September 1947. He married Geraldine Haddon Cave in 1889 and with her had eight children:

- Albert Francis Joseph Horatio Nelson, 6th Earl Nelson
- Henry Edward Joseph Horatio Nelson, 7th Earl Nelson
- Lt.-Col. Hon. Charles Sebastian Joseph Horatio Nelson (1896–1964)
- Lady Edith Mary Josephine Nelson (1897–1978)
- Lady Mary Winifred Nelson (1899–1984)
- Lady Geraldine Mary Diana Nelson (1900–1982)
- George Joseph Horatio Nelson, 8th Earl Nelson
- Hon. John Marie Joseph Horatio Nelson (1908–1970).

Edward Nelson was a Lieutenant in the Royal Wiltshire Militia (later the 3rd (Reserve) Battalion, Wiltshire Regiment with whom he served on the Nile Expedition of 1885–86.

During the Second World War, the North and South Wings of Trafalgar Park were occupied by tenants with Thomas, 4th Earl Nelson, and Edward Agar Nelson living in the main house. He inherited Trafalgar Park in 1947 and sold it in 1948 as a result of the loss of the government pension attached to his title and Death Duties imposed on the estate following the death of his brother.

Lord Nelson died in London in January 1951 aged 90, and on his death the title passed to his son Albert Nelson. Edward had only been Earl Nelson for three years and four months exactly at the time of his death.

Peerage of the United Kingdom
Preceded by Thomas Nelson	Earl Nelson; 1947–1951	Succeeded by Albert Nelson
