= Downton, Wiltshire =

Village in Wiltshire, England

Coordinates: 50.993°N 1.743°W

Downton
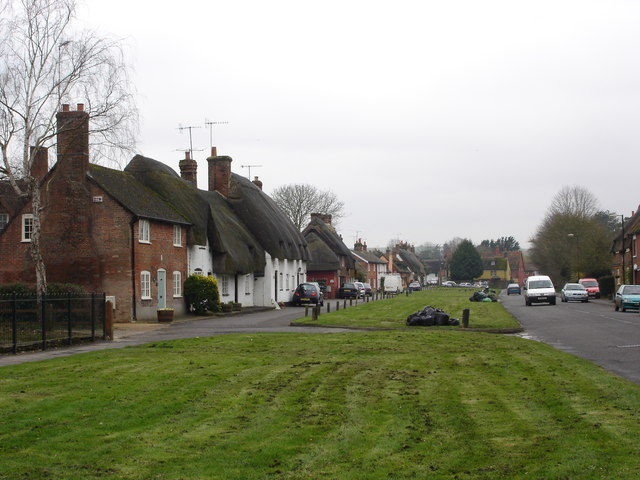
- The Borough

- Location within Wiltshire
- Population: 3,300 (in 2021)
- OS grid reference: SU180215
- Civil parish: Downton
- Unitary authority: Wiltshire
- Ceremonial county: Wiltshire
- Region: South West
- Country: England
- Sovereign state: United Kingdom
- Post town: Salisbury
- Postcode district: SP5
- Dialling code: 01725
- Police: Wiltshire
- Fire: Dorset and Wiltshire
- Ambulance: South Western
- UK Parliament: Salisbury
- Website: Parish Council

Downton is a village and civil parish on the River Avon in southern Wiltshire, England, about 6 miles (10 km) southeast of the city of Salisbury. The parish is on the county boundary with Hampshire and is close to the New Forest; it includes the villages of Wick and Charlton-All-Saints, and the small ancient settlement of Witherington. The Trafalgar Park estate erased the former settlement of Standlynch. The parish church, Trafalgar House, and two more houses are Grade I listed.

Downton village is on the east bank of the river. Wick lies on the opposite bank, and is linked to Charlton by the A338 Poole–Oxfordshire road, which accompanies the river north–south through the parish.

== History ==
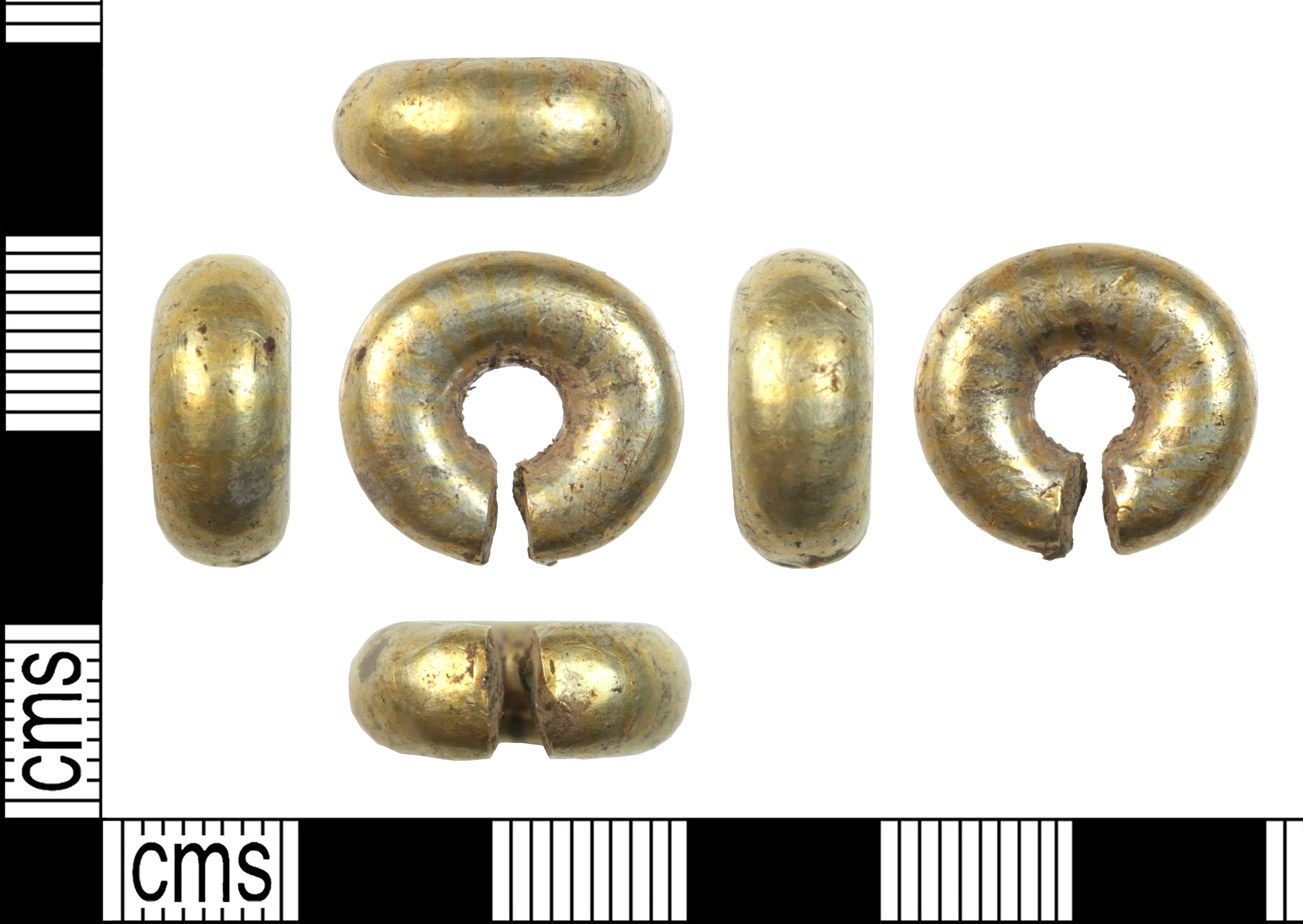
A late-Bronze Age, gold penannular ring, dating from c. 1150 – c. 800 BCE, found in Downton in 2019

Downton can trace its ancient inhabitants to Neolithic, Iron Age, Roman and Saxon times. Evidence of Neolithic occupation was found at Downton in 1956–7 during archaeological excavations in advance of a housing development. Close to this site, in 1953 the site of a Roman villa was discovered. Excavations in 1955–56 revealed a villa with tessellated floors, at least two featuring mosaics, a hypocaust and bath house. Roman features were found over an area of about 12 acres. The villa is no longer visible, but the finds, including one of the mosaics, are displayed in Salisbury Museum. Clearbury Ring, on high ground in the northwest of the parish, is an Iron Age hillfort.

The ancient parish of Downton covered a large area, extending north to Nunton and southeast beyond Redlynch as far as Hamptworth. Downton was probably the principal village in the 7th and 8th centuries, and became important as the centre of the manor belonging to the Bishop of Winchester.

The Domesday Book of 1068 recorded a large settlement of 131 households at Downton. Henry of Blois, Bishop of Winchester, built a (possibly incomplete) motte-and-bailey castle near the river.

Moot House (or The Moot) was built c. 1700 just to the east; the castle site, of some 3.6 hectares (8.9 acres), was developed as the gardens of the house c. 1720. Today the house is a Grade I listed building. The gardens are owned and managed by a preservation trust and are open to the public.

The Manor House, northwest of the parish church, is a Grade I listed hall house with attached chapel from the 14th century, altered in the 17th and 19th. The house and church were an endowment to Winchester College by William of Wykeham in 1380; the house was later leased by Elizabeth I, and was occupied by a brother of Sir Walter Raleigh in the 17th century.

The manor house at Standlynch was built in 1733 for Sir Peter Vandeput and extended in 1766 by Henry Dawkins, plantation owner and Member of Parliament. In 1814 the nation bought the estate and gave it to Lord Nelson's heirs. They changed its name to Trafalgar Park, to commemorate Nelson's victory at the Battle of Trafalgar.

The artist John Constable visited Downton in 1820, and his sketch of the Avon with the church in the background is held in the British Museum. In 1836, a time of continued agricultural hardship, the parish sponsored an emigration of more than 200 of its poor people to Upper Canada for opportunities there; they sailed in April 1836 on the ship King William.

From 1880 to 1906 John Wrightson, a pioneer in agricultural education, had his Downton Agricultural College here.

The Salisbury and Dorset Junction Railway, linking Salisbury with the line to Poole and Bournemouth, was built north–south across the parish and opened in 1866. Its route passed close to the east of Downton village, with Downton station reached from Lode Hill. The line was absorbed into the LSWR in 1883. It was closed in 1964 and the track was lifted the following year.

Nunton (with Bodenham) and Standlynch) became civil parishes in the 19th century, then as the population grew and churches were built, Downton was reduced in size. In 1896 its eastern part became Redlynch civil parish, in 1897 Charlton and Witherington were united with Standlynch to form the civil parish of Standlynch with Charlton All Saints, and in 1923 Morgan's Vale and Woodfalls were taken to form a new civil parish. Finally, in 1934 Standlynch and Charlton were reunited with Downton, and Morgan's Vale and Woodfalls were added to Redlynch.

For about a decade from around 1961, Downton had an important part to play in British motorsport. Its Downton Engineering Works produced some of the motors used by racing cars.

Housebuilding in the 20th and 21st centuries has developed the Wick area into a western extension of Downton village.

In 1999 a community project, The Downton Millennial Book Fund, published an illustrated history of the village from its ancient days.

Downton is the namesake for the British ITV show Downton Abbey, but there Downton is placed in Yorkshire. As a result of this confusion, the place received some inflow of American tourists, searching for the fictional manor house (which was actually Highclere Castle). The creator Julian Fellowes stated that the name was inspired from the Downton College of Agriculture (which was located in Salisbury and closed in 1906) that had been operated by John Wrightson, whose daughter Georgiana was Fellowes' paternal grandmother.

== Religious sites ==
=== Parish church ===
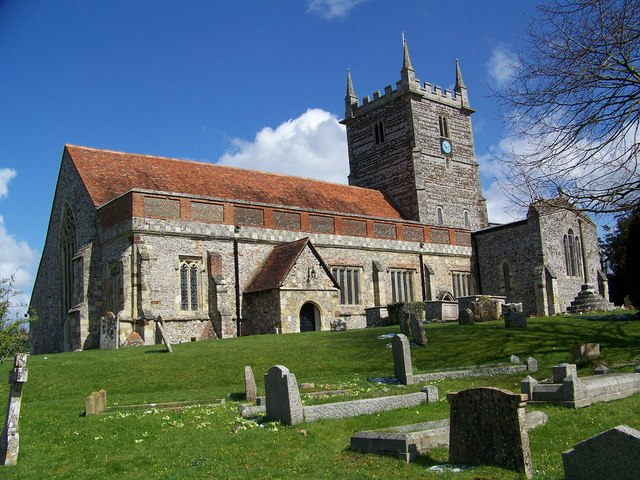
St Laurence's Church

St Laurence's Church, the Church of England parish church, has its origins in the 12th century; Nikolaus Pevsner describes it as "a large and interesting church". The nave is the oldest surviving work; the transepts are from the 13th century and the chancel from the 14th. Restoration was carried out in the 17th century, then in 1812 by D. A. Alexander and in 1860 by T. H. Wyatt. The tower had its upper part rebuilt in the 17th century and has eight bells, one of which is from the 14th century and two from the 17th.

Downton ecclesiastical parish was large, with dependant medieval churches at Nunton, Standlynch and Witherington; there were no churches at Morgan's Vale, Redlynch or Charlton until the 19th century. The church was designated as Grade I listed in 1960. Today it is part of the Forest and Avon team ministry, a grouping of six churches in Wiltshire and Hampshire.

=== Other Downton churches ===
There were Baptists in Downton from the 17th century. A congregation of Particular Baptists formed c. 1738 and built a chapel at South Lane in 1791. They replaced that in 1857 with a larger building on the same site. This continues as Downton Baptist Church.

A Methodist chapel was built in 1896 on Downton High Street, replacing an earlier chapel at Lode Hill. The building continues in use as Downton Methodist Church.

A Roman Catholic chapel of the Good Shepherd was founded in 1914 at Barford Lane, at the northern edge of Downton, on land given by the Nelsons. The present building was built in 1950 and is served from Salisbury.

=== Elsewhere in the parish ===
Charlton has an Anglican church, All Saints, built in 1851 partly at the expense of Lord Nelson. Construction is in brick to designs of T. H. Wyatt, in Early English style. Today the church is part of the Chalke Valley benefice.

At Standlynch a small church near the river, dedicated to St Mary, was probably founded in 1147. It was rebuilt in 1677 and became a private chapel for Standlynch manor and later for the Nelsons of Trafalgar Park. The building was restored by William Butterfield in 1859–66. The dedication was changed to St Michael and All Angels, probably in 1914, and the church has been closed since 1947.

A church stood at Witherington in 1147 but fell into disuse in the 15th century.

A Wesleyan Methodist chapel was built near All Saints' church in 1864. It was decommissioned and converted to a private house in the 1970s.

== Geography ==
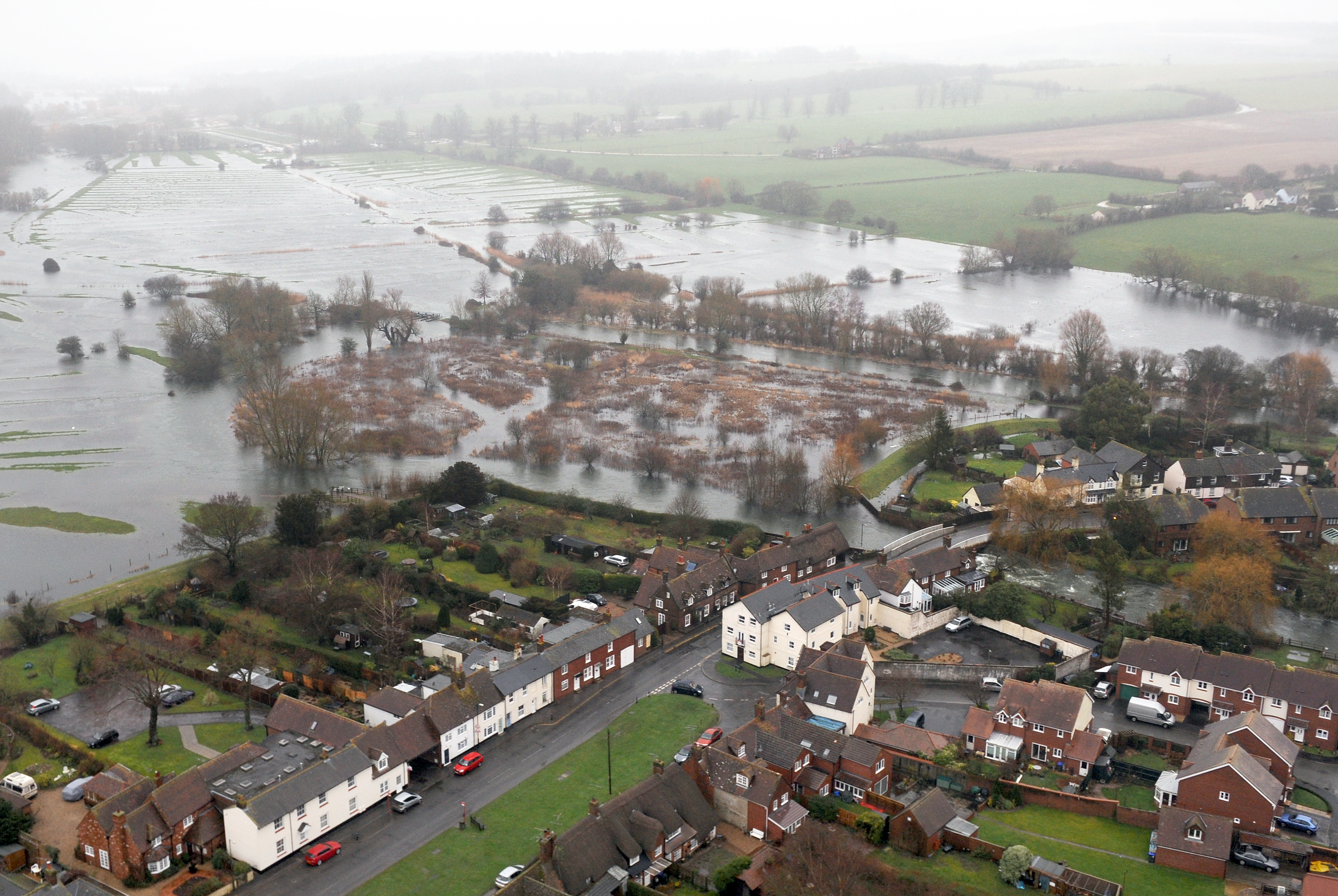
Downton during floods in 2014

The River Avon flows through Downton. For centuries, villagers maintained reed beds for harvesting materials to make baskets, trays and wicker furniture. The river is the source of occasional flooding in the village. Major flood defence work was carried out in 2002 after a severe flood following heavy rains. The water meadows – fields through which irrigation channels were made using weirs and ditches – use the water from this river.

== Governance ==
Downton has a fifteen-member parish council with responsibility for local issues, including setting an annual precept (local rate) to cover the council's operating costs and producing annual accounts for public scrutiny. The parish council evaluates local planning applications and works with the local police, Wiltshire Council officers, and neighbourhood watch groups on matters of security, crime, and traffic. The council's role also includes initiating projects for the maintenance and repair of parish facilities, as well as consulting with Wiltshire Council on the maintenance, repair, and improvement of highways, drainage, footpaths, public transport, and street cleaning. Conservation matters (including trees and listed buildings) and environmental issues are also the responsibility of the council.

The parish council is divided into two wards: Downton, which elects fourteen councillors, and Charlton-All-Saints, which elects one councillor.

Along with the neighbouring parishes of Odstock, Britford and Coombe Bissett, Downton parish is part of the ward of Downton & Ebble Valley for elections to the unitary authority of Wiltshire Council, which has the wider responsibility for providing services such as education, refuse collection, and tourism.

For Westminster elections the parish is part of the Salisbury constituency, which has been represented since 2010 by John Glen for the Conservatives. From 1295 to 1832, Downton was a parliamentary borough, giving eligible residents the right to elect two MPs to Parliament. Notable MPs included Blessed John Story, an English Roman Catholic martyr, later beatified by Pope Leo XIII; Sir Carew Raleigh, elder brother of Sir Walter Raleigh; Robert 'Bonnie Bobby Shafto', the subject of a popular folk song; and the poet Robert Southey, who was elected without his knowledge and declined to take his seat.

== Economy ==
Until the 20th century, the primary economic activity of the village had been agriculture and related crafts. For instance, in the early 1900s, craftsmen still maintained reed beds in the river for their materials to make baskets and furniture. Tanning was an important industry, with a tannery recorded as existing in the village in the 16th century. A new tannery, which became Downton Tanning Company Ltd, was built in the early 19th century. It made leather for harnesses and saddles until it closed in 1998. Its building has been converted into housing and retirement homes.

Downton Business Centre, on the A338, is home to a variety of businesses, including: Hop Back Brewery and Help for Heroes Trading. Hop Back first brewed its beer in 1986 at the Wyndham Arms in Salisbury. Six years later, the company moved to larger premises in Downton. As of 2010, Hop Back owned eleven public houses around the south of England. Nearby is the smaller Downton Brewery, established in 2003. Help for Heroes (H4H) is a charity that raises money to supplement existing government provision for injured members of the British Armed Forces.

== Transport ==
The busy A338 Bournemouth to Oxfordshire road runs through the western side of the village. The village's main street, forming The Borough, High Street and Lode Hill, has been designated as the B3080 road to the New Forest.

The Wilts & Dorset bus company runs its X3 route along the A338 on the western side of the village, with a half-hourly service north to Salisbury and south to Bournemouth. It also runs the more local routes 40 and 44 through the main part of village.

== Amenities ==
Downton has a village hall (the Memorial Hall) and three pubs: the Bull Hotel, the Goat and the Wooden Spoon. It also has a café, The Borough Café situated on the ancient Borough.

Downton Leisure Centre (owned by the Brian Whitehead Sports Centre Association), in the eastern outskirts of Wick, provides sports and social facilities. It is the home of Downton F.C., who play in the Wessex Football League.

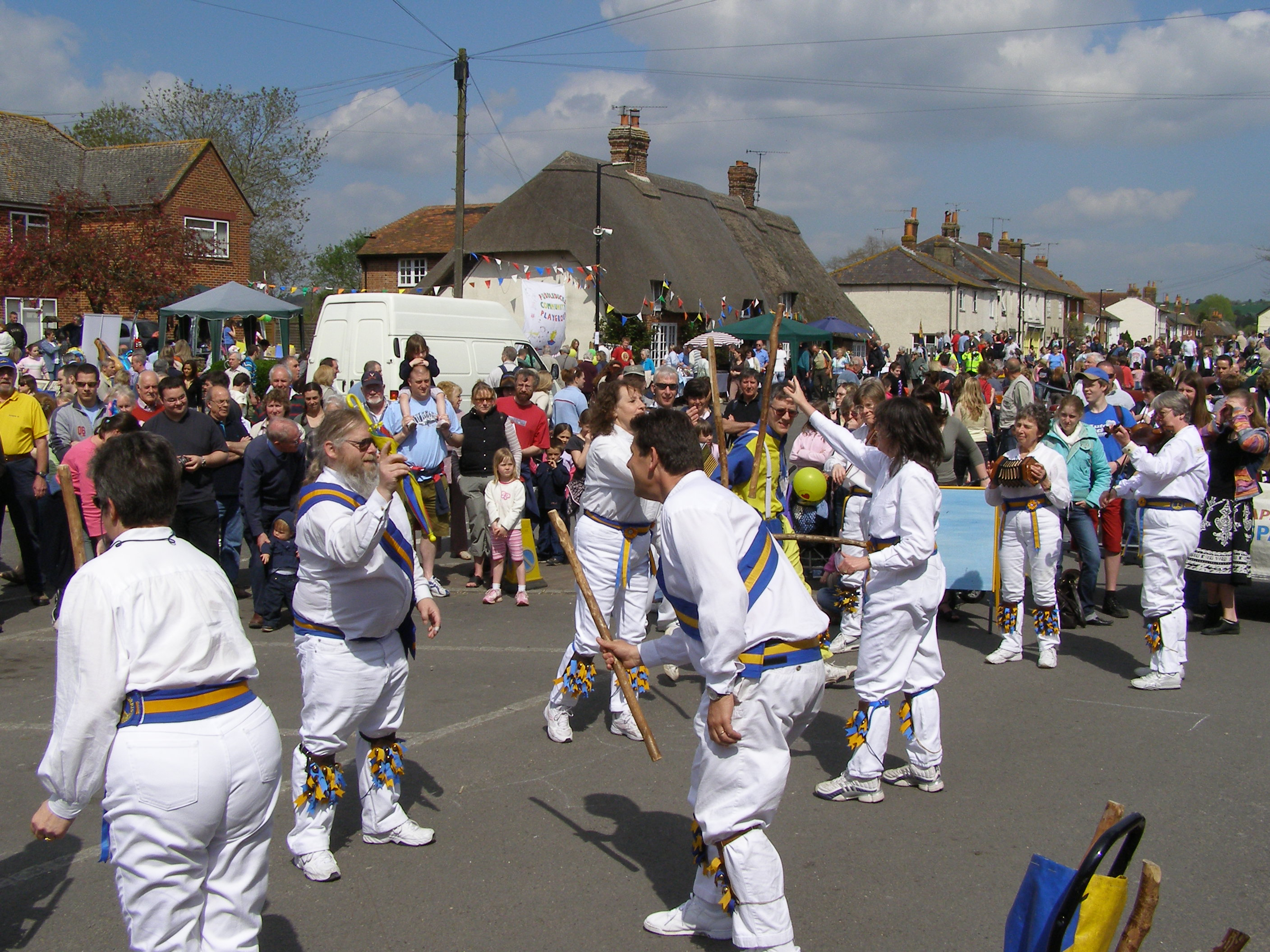
Sarum Morris perform at the 2006 Cuckoo Fair in Downton

Downton holds an annual village fête called the Cuckoo Fair on the Saturday nearest May Day. Originally a country fair where livestock would be traded and agricultural workers would seek employment, the fair was abandoned after the First World War. It was revived in its modern form in 1980 by Peter Waddington MBE. The origin of the name is unknown.

The Avon Valley Path passes through Charlton, then crosses the river at Downton before turning southeast towards Hampshire.

Before its connection to the national grid, Downton was supplied with electricity from a small local power station operated by the Central Electricity Generating Board (CEGB). In 1958, the station comprised a 35-kilowatt (47-shaft-horsepower) water turbine driven by the River Avon and an 82-kilowatt (111-metric-horsepower; 110-brake-horsepower) diesel engine plant. Electricity was available to consumers at 400–420 volts alternating current. In 1958, the station supplied 215 megawatt-hours (770 gigajoules) of electricity; in 1972, supplies were 287 megawatt-hours (1,030 gigajoules). The power station was decommissioned in the mid-1970s.

== Education ==
Downton has a primary school and a secondary school. Downton CofE (VA) Primary School dates from 1895, when it replaced older schools. Children of all ages attended until the secondary school opened.

The Trafalgar School at Downton (for ages 11–16) opened at Wick in 1964, at first as a secondary modern, then becoming a comprehensive called Downton School in the early 1970s. The school was renamed in 2005 to commemorate the 200th anniversary of the Battle of Trafalgar.

== Sources ==
Waymouth, David (1999). Downton: 7000 Years of an English Village. Downton: Downton Millennial Book Fund. ISBN 0-9536109-0-X.
