= Earl Nelson =

Earldom in the Peerage of the United Kingdom

Earldom of Nelson
- Blazon Arms: Or, a cross flory sable surmounted by a bend gules thereon another bend engrailed of the field charged with three hand-grenades of the second fired proper a chief of augmentation wavy argent thereon waves of the sea from which issuant in the centre a palm tree between a disabled ship on the dexter and a battery in ruins on the sinister all proper. Crests: 1st: On a naval crown or the Chelenk or Diamond Plume of Triumph, presented to Admiral Horatio, Viscount Nelson by the Grand Signor, Sultan Selim III. 2nd: Upon Waves of the sea the stern of a Spanish man-of-war, all proper, thereon inscribed SAN JOSEF. Supporters: Dexter: A sailor habited and armed with a cutlass, with a pair of pistols in his belt proper, his right hand supporting a pike proper, thereon hoisted a commodore’s flag gules, and his left holding a palm branch proper. Sinister: A lion reguardant, in his mouth two broken flagstaffs proper, flowing from the one the Spanish flag or and gules and from the other a French flag gules argent and azure in his dexter paw a palm branch proper.
- Creation date: 20 November 1805; 221 years ago
- Created by: King George III
- Peerage: Peerage of the United Kingdom
- First holder: William, 2nd Baron Nelson
- Present holder: Simon, 10th Earl Nelson
- Heir apparent: Thomas Nelson, Viscount Merton
- Remainder to: Special remainder (see main text)
- Subsidiary titles: Viscount Merton; Baron Nelson
- Former seat: Trafalgar House
- Motto: Over the 2nd crest: FAITH AND WORKS; Below the shield: PALMAM QUI MERUIT FERAT (Let him bear the palm who has deserved it)

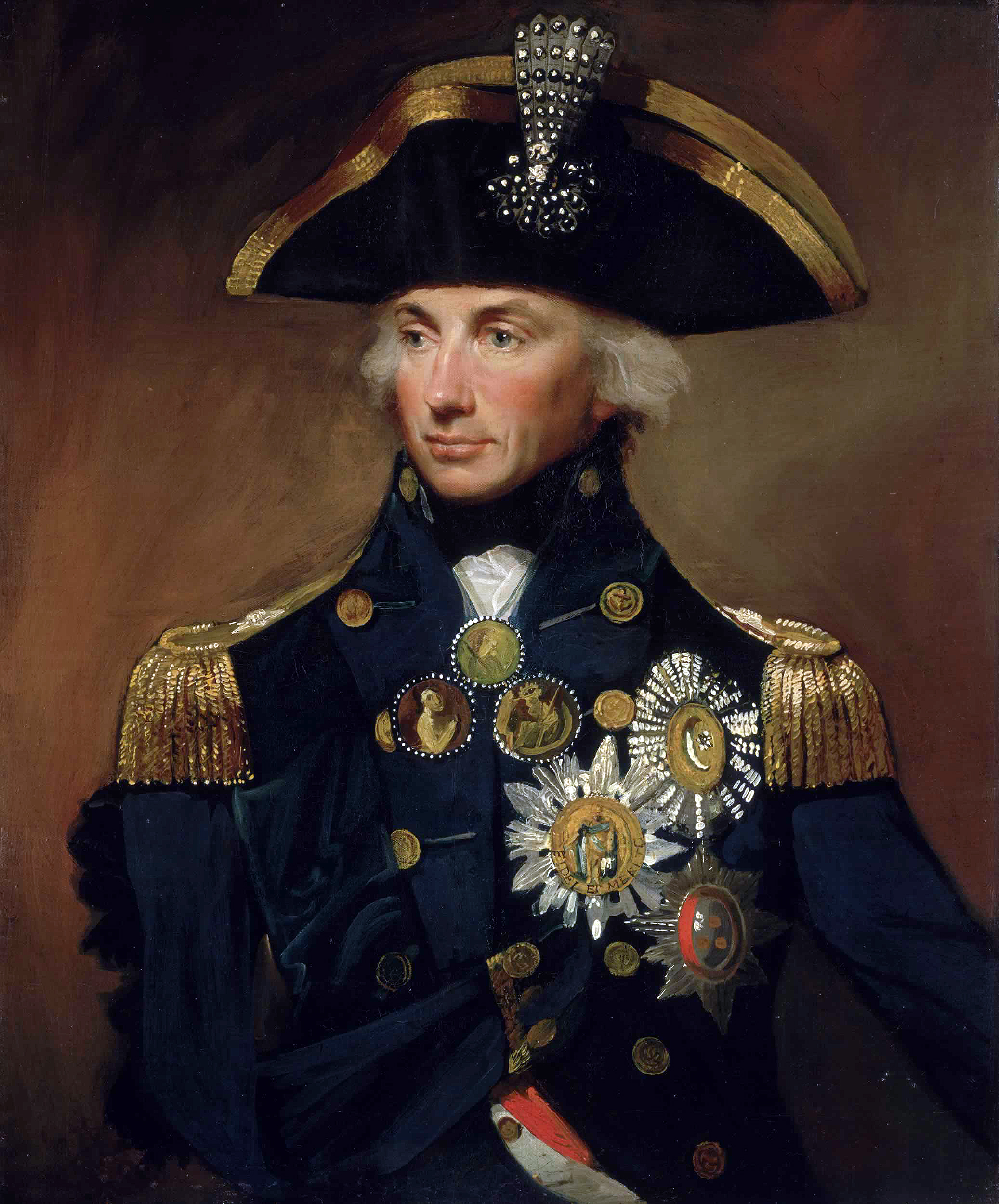
Horatio Nelson, 1st Viscount Nelson "of the Nile and of Burnham Thorpe" (1801), 1st Baron Nelson "of the Nile and of Burnham Thorpe" (1798), 1st Baron Nelson "of the Nile and of Hillborough" (1801, with special remainder), 1st Duke of Bronte (1799, Peerage of the Kingdom of Sicily and Naples)

Earl Nelson, of Trafalgar and of Merton in the County of Surrey, is a title in the Peerage of the United Kingdom. It was created on 20 November 1805 for The Rev. The 2nd Baron Nelson, one month after the death of his younger brother, Vice-Admiral The 1st Viscount Nelson, the famous naval hero of the Napoleonic Wars and victor of the Battle of Trafalgar of 21 October 1805 (during which he was killed in action). The title is extant, the present holder being Simon, 10th Earl Nelson, who has an heir apparent. The family seat of Trafalgar House in Wiltshire (also known as Standlynch Park) was sold in 1948 by Edward, 5th Earl Nelson.

== History ==
The title was created on 20 November 1805 for the Reverend William Nelson, 2nd Baron Nelson, who was a son of the Reverend Edmund Nelson (1722–1802) and an elder brother of Horatio Nelson. The Nelson family had been settled in Norfolk for many generations, and the Reverend Edmund Nelson was Rector of Hillborough and of Burnham Thorpe in that county. He married Catherine Suckling, whose maternal grandmother Mary was the sister of both the 1st Earl of Orford and the 1st Baron Walpole. Their fifth but third-surviving son was the renowned naval commander Horatio Nelson.

After defeating the French at the Battle of the Nile in 1798, Horatio Nelson was raised to the Peerage of Great Britain on 6 October 1798 as Baron Nelson, of the Nile, and of Burnham Thorpe in the County of Norfolk, with normal remainder to the heirs male of his body. In 1799, he was created Duke of Bronte (Italian: Duca di Bronte) by King Ferdinando III of Sicily, which title he was given royal sanction to use in Britain.

After defeating the Danish fleet at the Battle of Copenhagen in April 1801, Lord Nelson was further honoured when he was made Viscount Nelson, of the Nile, and of Burnham Thorpe in the County of Norfolk, with normal remainder to the heirs male of his body, on 22 May 1801. On 18 August of the same year, he was created Baron Nelson, of the Nile, and of Hilborough in the County of Norfolk, with remainder, in default of male issue of his own, to his father and the heirs male of his body, and failing them to the heirs male of the body severally and successively of his sisters Susannah Bolton and Catherine Matcham. Both titles were in the Peerage of the United Kingdom.

Viscount Nelson was killed at the Battle of Trafalgar on 21 October 1805. Since he had no legitimate children, the barony of 1798 and the viscountcy became extinct upon his death.

He was succeeded in the barony of 1801 according to the special remainder (and also in the dukedom of Bronte) by his elder brother, the Reverend William Nelson, who became the second Baron. On 20 November 1805, the second Baron was created Viscount Merton, of Trafalgar and of Merton in the County of Surrey, and Earl Nelson, of Trafalgar and of Merton in the County of Surrey, in honour of his late brother and with similar remainder to the barony of 1801. Both titles are in the Peerage of the United Kingdom. The first earl died without surviving male issue and was succeeded in the dukedom of Bronte by his daughter Charlotte.

The first earl was succeeded in the British titles (according to the special remainders) by his nephew Thomas Bolton, the second earl. He was the eldest son of the aforementioned Susannah Bolton, a sister of the first earl. The second earl assumed the surname of Nelson upon succeeding to the peerages. He only held the titles for eight months and on his early death, the titles passed to his eldest son, the third earl. He was succeeded by his third but eldest surviving son, the fourth earl. He never married and on his death in 1947, the titles passed to his eighty-seven-year-old younger brother, the fifth earl. He was succeeded by his eldest son, the sixth earl, who was a lecturer in astronomy and anthropology. Two of his younger brothers, the seventh and eighth earls, both succeeded in the titles.

As of 2017, the peerages are held by Simon John Horatio Nelson, 10th Earl Nelson (born 1971), a great-grandson of the fifth earl. He succeeded in 2009 and is the eldest son of Peter John Horatio Nelson, the ninth earl.

Two other members of the family also had distinguished naval careers. The Hon. Maurice Horatio Nelson (1832–1914), third son of the second Earl, was a rear-admiral in the Royal Navy. His eldest son, Maurice Henry Horatio Nelson (1864–1942), was a captain in the Royal Navy.

== Coat of arms ==
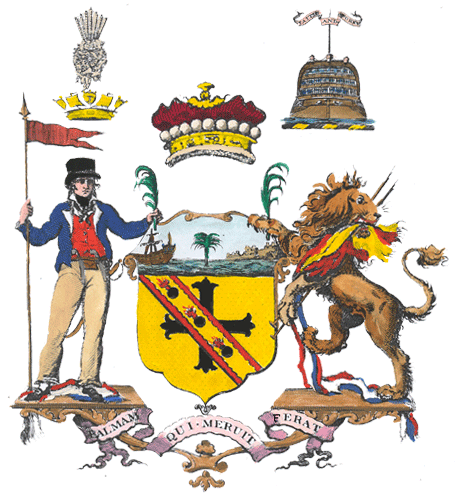
Contemporary drawing of the heraldic achievement of Horatio Nelson before Trafalgar

Arms of William Nelson, 1st Earl Nelson, displaying the additional augmentation that he was granted

Arms were granted to Admiral Horatio Nelson and confirmed on 20 October 1797. Nelson's paternal arms (Or, a cross flory sable over all a bendlet gules) were augmented to honour his naval victories. After the Battle of Cape St Vincent (14 February 1797), Nelson was created a Knight of the Bath and was granted heraldic supporters (appropriate for peers) of a sailor and a lion.

In honour of the Battle of the Nile in 1798, the Crown granted him an augmentation of honour blazoned On a chief wavy argent a palm tree between a disabled ship and a ruinous battery all issuant from waves of the sea all proper, the Latin motto Palmam qui meruit ferat ("let him who has earned it bear the palm"), and added to his supporters a palm branch in the hand of the sailor and in the paw of the lion, and a "tri-colored flag and staff in the mouth of the latter".

After Nelson's death, his elder brother and heir William Nelson, 1st Earl Nelson, was granted a further augmentation: On a fess wavy overall azure the word TRAFALGAR or. This additional augmentation was not used by those who succeeded him in the earldom, including the present Earl Nelson.

== Baron Nelson, First creation (1798) ==
- Horatio Nelson, 1st Viscount Nelson, 1st Baron Nelson (1758–1805) (extinct on his death; created Viscount Nelson in 1801)

== Viscount Nelson (1801) ==
- Horatio Nelson, 1st Viscount Nelson, 1st Baron Nelson (1758–1805) (extinct on his death)

== Baron Nelson, Second creation (1801) ==
- Horatio Nelson, 1st Viscount Nelson, 1st Baron Nelson (1758–1805)
- William Nelson, 2nd Baron Nelson (1757–1835) (created Earl Nelson in 1805), elder brother of the aforementioned Horatio Nelson

== Earls Nelson (1805) ==
- William Nelson, 1st Earl Nelson (1757–1835)
- Thomas Nelson, 2nd Earl Nelson (1786–1835), nephew of the 1st Earl Nelson
- Horatio Nelson, 3rd Earl Nelson (1823–1913), eldest son of the 2nd Earl
- Thomas Horatio Nelson, 4th Earl Nelson (1857–1947) eldest son of the 3rd Earl
- Edward Agar Horatio Nelson, 5th Earl Nelson (1860–1951) younger brother of the 4th Earl
- Albert Francis Joseph Horatio Nelson, 6th Earl Nelson (1890–1957) eldest son of the 5th Earl
- Henry Edward Joseph Horatio Nelson, 7th Earl Nelson (1894–1972) younger brother of the 6th Earl
- George Joseph Horatio Nelson, 8th Earl Nelson (1905–1981) younger brother of the 6th and 7th Earls
- Peter John Horatio Nelson, 9th Earl Nelson (1941–2009) grandson of the 5th Earl, nephew of the 8th Earl
- Simon John Horatio Nelson, 10th Earl Nelson (b. 1971) eldest son of the 9th Earl

The heir apparent is the present holder's only son, Thomas John Horatio Nelson, Viscount Merton (b. 2010).

== Family tree ==
Nelson family tree

Baroness Hood, of Catherington (GB), 1795	Baronet Hood, of Catherington (GB), 1778; Baron Hood of Catherington (Ireland), 1782; Viscount Hood of Whitley (UK, 1st creation), 1796	Baron Bridport (Ireland), 1794; Viscount Bridport (UK, 1st creation), 1800
Edmund Nelson; 1722–1802	Susannah Linzee; 1726–1806; Baroness Hood, suo jure	Samuel Hood; 1724–1816; 1st Viscount Hood, etc.	Alexander Hood; 1726–1814; 1st Baron Bridport, 1st Viscount Bridport
Viscounty Bridport (1st creation) extinct, 1814
Earl Nelson (UK), of Trafalgar and of Merton and Viscount Merton (UK), of Trafalgar and of Merton, 1805	Baron Nelson (GB), of the Nile, and of Burnham Thorpe (1st creation), 1798; Duke of Bronte (Italy), 1799; Viscount Nelson (UK), of the Nile, and of Burnham Thorpe, 1801; Baron Nelson (UK), of the Nile, and of Hilborough, 1801
Susannah Nelson 1755–1813	William Nelson; 1757–1835; 2nd Duke of Bronte, 1st Earl Nelson, etc., 2nd Baron Nelson of the Nile and of Hilborough	Horatio Nelson; 1758–1805; 1st Duke of Bronte, Viscount Nelson, Baron Nelson of the Nile and of Burnham Thorpe, 1st Baron Nelson of the Nile and of Hilborough	Henry Hood; 1753–1836; 2nd Viscount Hood, etc.
Barony Nelson of the Nile and of Hilborough extinct, 1835	Viscounty Nelson and Barony Nelson of the Nile and of Burnham Thorpe extinct, 1805
Thomas Bolton, later Nelson; 1786–1835; 2nd Earl Nelson, etc.	Charlotte Mary Hood; 1787–1873; 3rd Duchess of Bronte suo jure	Samuel Hood; 1788–1868; 2nd Baron Bridport
Viscount Bridport (UK, 2nd creation), 1868
Horatio Nelson; 1823–1913; 3rd Earl Nelson, etc.	Alexander Nelson Hood; 1814–1904; 4th Duke of Bronte, 1st Viscount Bridport, 3rd Baron Bridport
Thomas Horatio Nelson; 1857–1947; 4th Earl Nelson, etc.	Edward Agar Horatio Nelson; 1860–1951; 5th Earl Nelson, etc.	Arthur Wellington Alexander Nelson Hood; 1839–1924; 2nd Viscount Bridport, 4th Baron Bridport	Alexander Hood; 1854–1937; 5th Duke of Bronte
Maurice Henry Nelson Hood; 1881–1915
Albert Francis Joseph Horatio Nelson; 1890–1957; 6th Earl Nelson, etc.	Henry Edward Joseph Horatio Nelson; 1894–1972; 7th Earl Nelson, etc.	George Joseph Horatio Nelson; 1905–1981; 8th Earl Nelson, etc.	John Marie Joseph Horatio Nelson; 1908–1970	Rowland Arthur Herbert Nelson Hood; 1911–1969; 6th Duke of Bronte, 3rd Viscount Bridport, 4th Baron Bridport
Peter John Horatio Nelson; 1941–2009; 9th Earl Nelson, etc.	Alexander Nelson Hood b. 1948; 7th Duke of Bronte, 4th Viscount Bridport, 5th Baron Bridport
Simon John Horatio Nelson b. 1971; 10th Earl Nelson, etc.	Peregrine Alexander Nelson Hood b. 1974
Heir apparent to the Dukedom of Bronte and Viscounty and Barony Bridport
Thomas John Horatio Nelson b. 2010 styled Viscount Merton
Heir apparent to the Nelson Earldom

== Line of succession ==
Line of succession
- Rev. Edmund Nelson (1722–1802)
  - Susannah Nelson (1755–1813)
    - Thomas Nelson, 2nd Earl Nelson (1786–1835)
      - Horatio Nelson, 3rd Earl Nelson (1823–1913)
        - Edward Nelson, 5th Earl Nelson (1860–1951)
          - Hon. John Marie Joseph Horatio Nelson (1908–1970)
            - Peter Nelson, 9th Earl Nelson (1941–2009)
              - Simon Nelson, 10th Earl Nelson (born 1971)
                - (1). Thomas John Horatio Nelson, Viscount Merton (b. 2010)
              - (2). Hon. Edward James Horatio Nelson (b. 1994)
            - (3). Francis Edward Horatio Nelson (b. 1947)
              - (4). William John Horatio Nelson (b. 1975)
      - Hon. Maurice Horatio Nelson (1832–1914)
        - Charles Burrard Nelson (1868–1931)
          - John Charles Horatio Nelson (1905–1994)
            - Anthony Burrard Horatio Nelson (1935-2019)
              - (5). Thomas Antony Horatio Nelson (b. 1963)
              - (6). Edward Maximilian Nelson (b. 1971)
                - (7). Alfred John Horatio Nelson (b. 2005)
  - William Nelson, 1st Earl Nelson (1757–1835)
  - Horatio Nelson, 1st Viscount Nelson (1758–1805)

== See also ==
- Trafalgar House
- Viscount Bridport
- Emma, Lady Hamilton
