= Horatio Nelson, 3rd Earl Nelson =

British politician

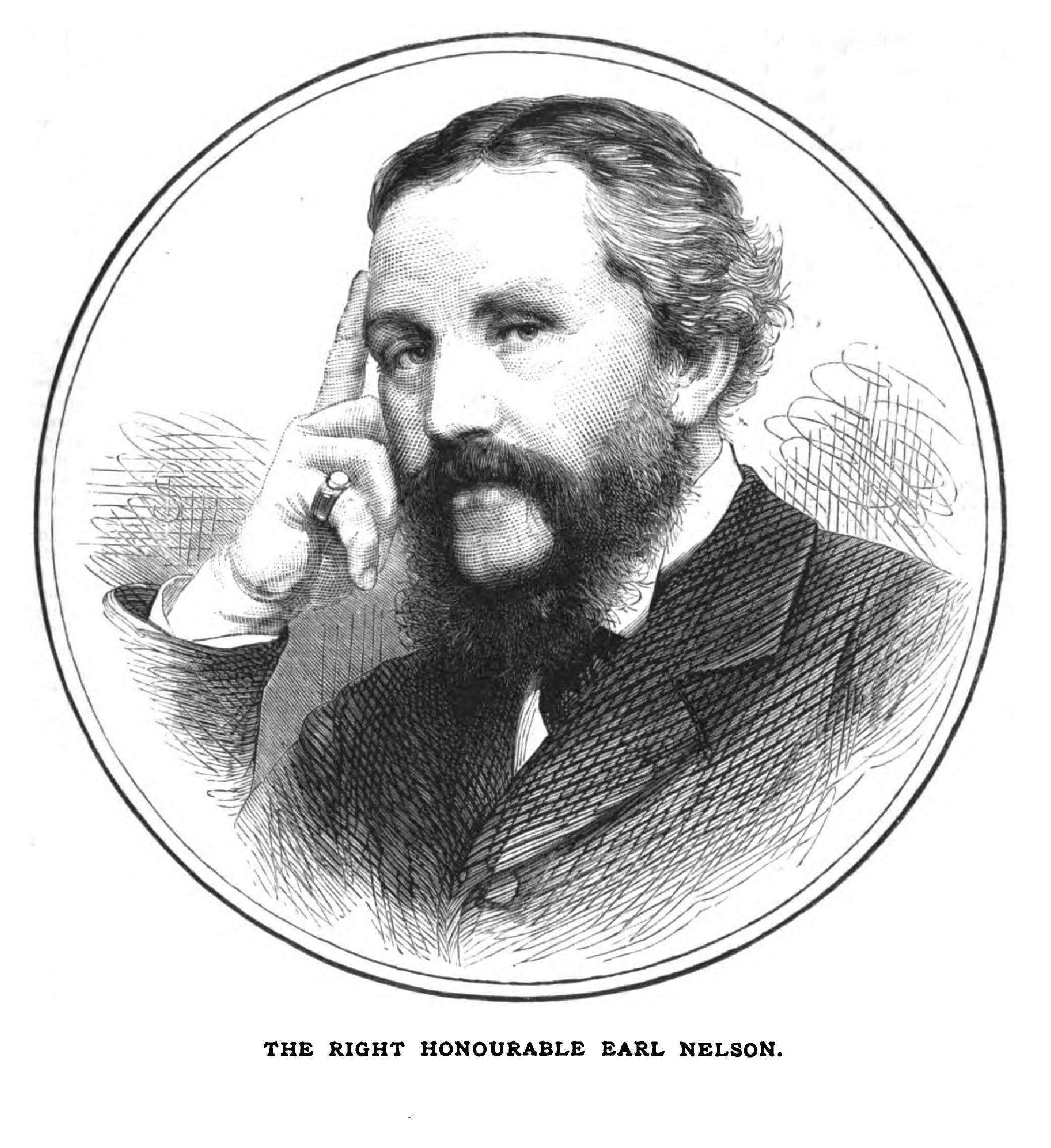
The 3rd Earl Nelson

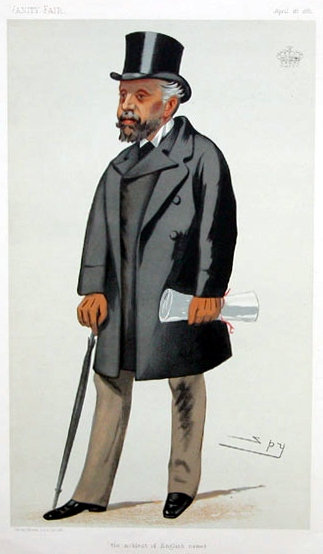
"The noblest of English names" Lord Nelson as caricatured by 'Spy' (Sir Leslie Ward) in Vanity Fair, April 1881

Horatio Nelson, 3rd Earl Nelson, DL (7 August 1823 – 25 February 1913), was a British politician.

He was the son of Thomas Bolton (a nephew of Vice Admiral The 1st Viscount Nelson) by his wife Frances Elizabeth Eyre. On 28 February 1835 his father inherited the title Earl Nelson from William Nelson, 1st Earl Nelson and adopted the surname of Nelson. He died on 1 November that year, and his son Horatio succeeded to the title and the estate, Trafalgar House in Wiltshire.

He was educated at Prebendal School, Eton College and Trinity College, Cambridge, where he was president of the University Pitt Club.

In the House of Lords Lord Nelson supported the Protectionist Tories under Lord Derby, and served as party chief whip in the Lords. However, when Lord Derby formed his first government in February 1852, Nelson was replaced by Lord Colville of Culross.

Lord Nelson was a member of the Canterbury Association from 17 October 1850.

Lord Nelson was married on 28 July 1845 at St George's Church, Hanover Square, to Lady Mary Jane Diana Agar, daughter of the 2nd Earl of Normanton and a granddaughter of the 11th Earl of Pembroke. She died in 1904. They had several children, including Herbert Horatio, styled Viscount Trafalgar, who died in 1905, Thomas Horatio, who succeeded his father as 4th Earl Nelson, and Edward Agar Horatio, who eventually succeeded as fifth Earl in 1947.

Peerage of the United Kingdom
Preceded by Thomas Nelson	Earl Nelson; 1835–1913	Succeeded by Thomas Horatio Nelson
