= Trafalgar Park, Wiltshire =

Grade I listed house in the United Kingdom

Coordinates: 51°0′46.68″N 1°44′10.92″W

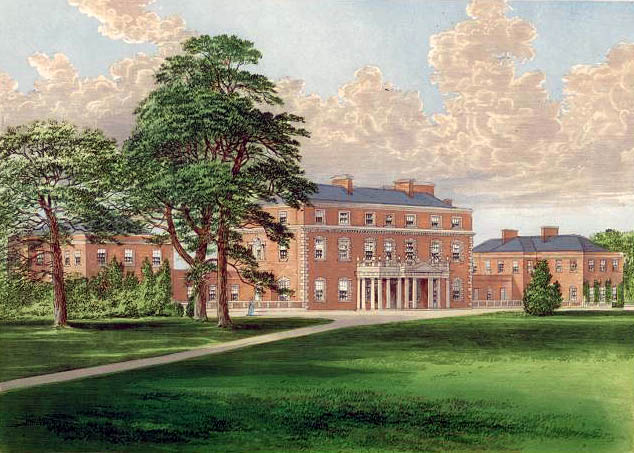
Trafalgar House circa 1880

Trafalgar Park (also known as Trafalgar House, formerly Standlynch Park) is a large Georgian country house about 1.4 miles (2.3 km) northeast of the village of Downton in south Wiltshire, England, and 4.5 miles (7.3 km) southeast of the city of Salisbury. It was built in 1733 and is now a Grade I listed building. The house stands in extensive grounds on the left bank of the River Avon, opposite Charlton-All-Saints.

== History ==
The house, formerly called Standlynch Park, was built on the ancient manor of Standlynch, listed in the Domesday Book of 1086. The Beauchamp family held the manor during the Tudor period, after which it was bought by the Greene family, who owned it until the 17th century, when it was sold to the Buckland family.

=== Construction of the house ===
Standlynch Manor was bought by Sir Peter Vandeput in 1726. Three years later, he had John James design what would eventually become the Trafalgar Park which can be seen today. Sir Peter died in 1748, bequeathing the estate to his son George, who in 1752 sold it to Sir William Young. Henry Dawkins bought it from Young for £22,000 in 1765. Over time, the expansion of the estate erased the former settlement of Standlynch.

In 1766 Henry Dawkins had John Wood design pavilions to the north and south of the building. He also had Nicholas Revett add a stone portico and remodel the internal architecture of the north wing. The music room was redecorated by Giovanni Battista Cipriani. Dawkins died in 1814, and the executors of the estate sought buyers.

=== Nelson family, 1815–1948 ===
Purchase of Estate for Lord Nelson Act 1815
- Act of Parliament
- Parliament of the United Kingdom
- Long title: An act to grant a further Sum of Money for purchasing an Estate to accompany the Title of Earl Nelson, and also to amend Two Acts of the Forty sixth and Fifty third Years of His present Majesty's Reign, for making such Purchase.
- Citation: 55 Geo. 3. c. 96
- Territorial extent: United Kingdom

Dates
- Royal assent: 14 June 1815
- Commencement: 14 June 1815 (Note: The Acts of Parliament (Commencement) Act 1793.)
Other legislation
Amends	Lord Nelson (Annuity) Act 1806; Settlement of Estate on Lord Nelson Act 1813

Status: Current legislation

Text of statute as originally enacted

During the Battle of Trafalgar off the coast of Spain in 1805, Horatio Nelson, 1st Viscount Nelson, was shot and died on 21 October, leaving a widow but no legitimate offspring. Nelson's closest male relative was his elder brother, the Rev. William Nelson, who was created Earl Nelson in 1806 along with other titles of Horatio's and who lobbied for an estate in honour of his brother. Parliament's Lords of the Treasury resolved accordingly. Standlynch Park was chosen in 1814 and by an act of Parliament, the Purchase of Estate for Lord Nelson Act 1815 (55 Geo. 3. c. 96), bought for £90,000 and was renamed Trafalgar Park. The 1st Earl also acquired nearby Redlynch House (2.8 km to south-east) with its 25-acre park, which he provided as a home to his son-in-law Samuel Hood, 2nd Baron Bridport.

After William Nelson's death, his nephew Thomas Bolton succeeded as the 2nd Earl Nelson and changed his surname to Nelson and inherited the property. When he died less than a year later, his 12-year-old son Horatio inherited the estate in 1836. The 3rd Earl Nelson went to great lengths to ensure that the estate was well maintained; he commissioned a new garden and renovation of Standlynch Church. Enriched by marriage and inheritance, the successors of William Nelson expanded their land holdings to 7,196 acres by 1884. In 1930, the 4th Earl Nelson purchased the panelling of the Captain's Cabin of HMS Ganges, built in 1821, which was being broken up, installing the panelling in the principal top floor room at Trafalgar Park. During the Second World War, the North and South Wings were occupied by tenants with Lord Nelson and his younger brother Edward Agar Nelson living in the main house.

=== Since 1948 ===
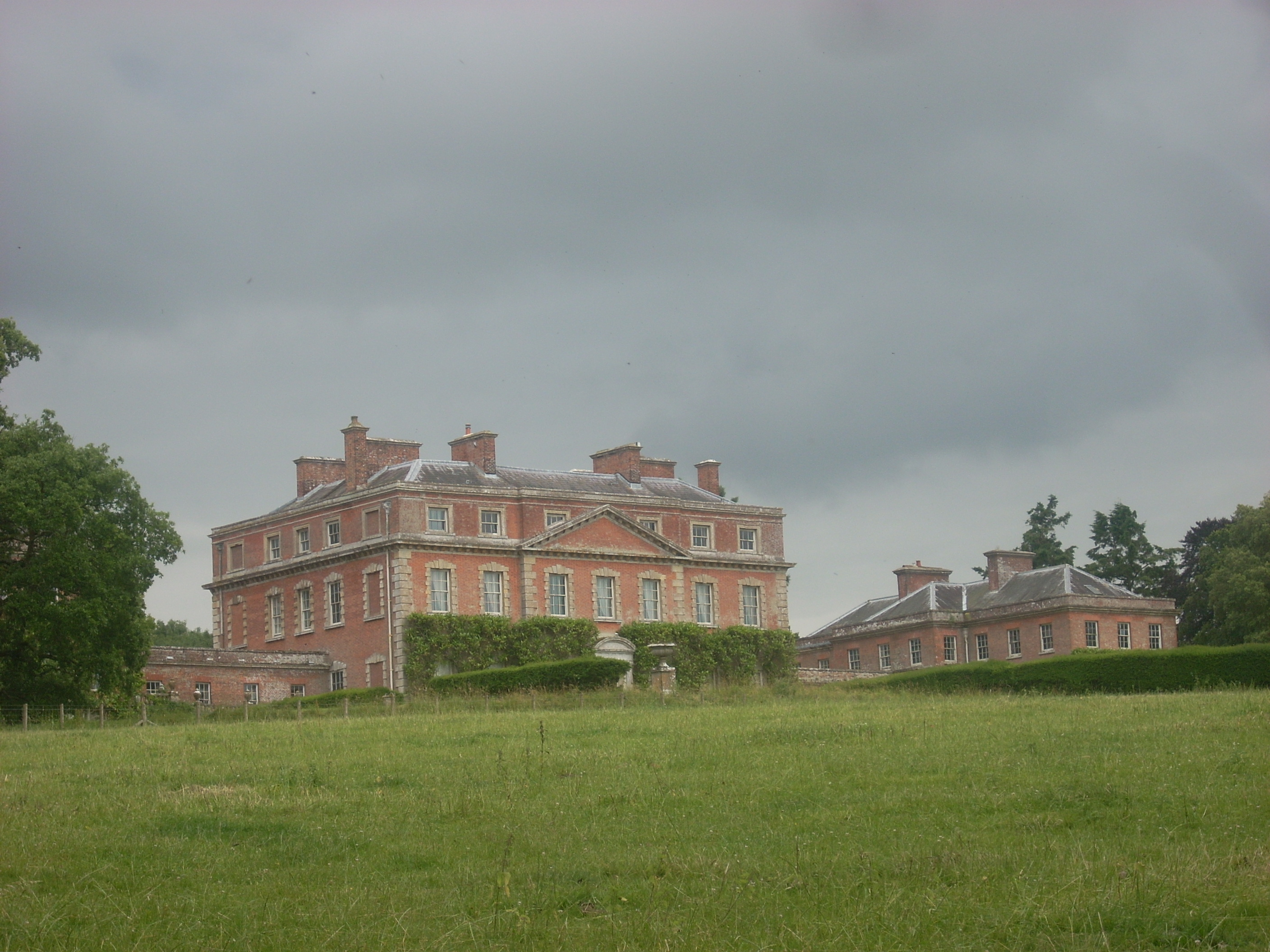
Trafalgar House in 2014.

In 1948, the 5th Earl Nelson sold the house and its remaining 3,415 acres for an estimated £58,000 to John Osborne, 11th Duke of Leeds, whose brother-in-law Oliver Lyttelton, 1st Viscount Chandos, lived there while he was an MP. The Duke's son-in-law, Viscount Chandos, was installed as sitting tenant in the house, which he eventually bought with only 10 acres of land when the rest of the estate was sold to the neighbouring Longford Castle estate in 1953. Lyttleton lived there until 1971, when banker Jeremy Pinckney bought the house for an estimated £75,000. A series of others bought and sold Trafalgar Park over the following years. Pinckney lived there for six years, after which he sold the estate to Tertius Murray Thriepland in 1978. In 1992 the house was sold to a Swedish hotelier Gunnar Bengtsson.

The house was recorded as Grade I listed in 1960.

Michael Wade of Besso Limited bought the house in 1995, by which time it needed extensive restoration. The renovation of the estate began after enough, some 33 acres, parkland had been returned from the Longford Castle Estate. The south stable has been converted into offices. According to Country Life, it was Wade who renamed Trafalgar House as Trafalgar Park.

Films made at the estate include 28 Days Later, Sense and Sensibility and Amazing Grace. Conferences and day-away board meetings are held here throughout the year, as are charity fundraisers. Over the years the Park has been host to associations such as the National Trust, The Civic Trust and the Salisbury Hospice. Tours are sometimes arranged although the house is closed to the public.

In January 2017, it was listed for sale at £12 million. As of 2021, it is listed for sale as "fully restored" at £11 million.

== Bibliography ==
- Christopher Hussey, English Country Houses: Mid Georgian (1955) ISBN 1-85149-031-0 (1988 edition)
