= Cunningham Communication =

Cunningham Communication, Inc. was a prominent public relations firm in Silicon Valley in the 1980s and 1990s that had many well-known clients in high-tech, including Adobe, Cisco, Motorola, PeopleSoft, Hewlett-Packard, and the IBM Consumer Division. It was founded by Andy Cunningham in 1985, after she left Regis McKenna.

Cunningham Communication developed the Momentum Management methodology that was documented in the book Momentum: How Companies Become Unstoppable Market Forces by John Volkmann and Ron Ricci.

In 1999, Cunningham Communication was reorganized into five subsidiaries with their own separate brands - Cunningham Public Relations, the Brand Momentum Group, the Momentum Research Group, Cunningham Ventures, and Fifth Gear. The firm was acquired in 2000 by Incepta and renamed Citigate Cunningham. After the dot-com bubble burst, the five companies were brought back together under the Citigate Cunningham brand. Andrea Cunningham stepped down from her position as CEO in 2003 to form CXO Communication.

Incepta merged with Huntsworth in 2005. In 2009, Huntsworth, merged Citigate Cunningham with Connecting Point Communications. The remnants of the firm are now part of Grayling Communications.

== Recognition ==
- Ranked 412 in Inc. Magazine's 500 Fastest Growing Private Companies in 1991

== Notable alumni ==
- Andy Cunningham, Founder of ZERO1 and currently the Founder and President of Cunningham Collective
- Zach Nelson, President and CEO of NetSuite
- Ron Ricci, Vice President, Executive and Customer Engagement at Cisco, and noted co-author of The Collaboration Imperative: Executive Strategies for Unlocking Your Organization's True Potential and Momentum: How Companies Become Unstoppable Market Forces
- John Volkmann, former Vice President of Corporate Communications at AMD and co-author of Momentum: How Companies Become Unstoppable Market Forces
- Andrew Wittman, Former Chief Marketing Officer of CA Technologies and currently the Chief Marketing Officer of Okta
- Julie Meyer, American born entrepreneur and inventor
- Nick Sturiale, Managing Partner, Ignition Partners
- Dan Race, Vice President of Corporate Communications, GoDaddy
- Brett Murray, Vice President of Marketing, View, Inc.
- Amanda McPherson, Chief Marketing Officer and Vice President of Developer Programs, The Linux Foundation
- Hadley Wilkins, Head of Marketing, Redpoint Ventures and former Executive Vice President, U.S. Technology Practice at Hill+Knowlton Strategies
- Mary Moslander, President and CEO of LiveHealthier, and former Vice President of Strategy and Product Development for The Washington Post
- Maxine Friedman, Senior Vice President of Bionic Solution
