= Bronto =

Bronto

- Bronto, an unofficial unit prefix, used to represent anything from 10^{15} to 10^{27} bytes, most often 10^{27}
- Bronto Software, a software company
- "Bronto-" a prefix used in the classification of many large animals, such as Brontosaurus or Brontotherium
- PSA Bronto (Russian: ПСА Бронто) Russian company for the production of special vehicles and SUVs.

== See also ==
- Bronte (disambiguation)
- Brontosaurus (disambiguation)
