= Bronte =

Bronte may refer to:

== People ==
Surname

- Brontë family, an English literary family that included:
  - Anne Brontë (1820–1849), novelist and poet
  - Branwell Brontë (1817–1848), painter and poet
  - Charlotte Brontë (1816–1855), novelist and poet
  - Emily Brontë (1818–1848), novelist and poet
  - Maria Brontë (1783–1821), mother
  - Patrick Brontë (1777–1861), curate, writer and father

First name

- Bronte Barratt (b. 1989), Australian swimmer
- Bronte Campbell (b. 1994), Australian swimmer
- Bronte Carmichael (born 2006), English actress
- Bronte Cockburn (born 1941), Australian basketball player
- Bronte Dooley (1867–1913), Australian politician
- Bronte Law (b. 1995), English golfer
- Bronte Macaulay (born 1994), surfer
- Bronte Moules, Australian diplomat
- Bronte Clucas Quayle (1919–1986), Australian barrister
- Bronté Woodard (1940–1980), American screenwriter

Title

- The Dukes of Bronte:
  - 1st Duke of Bronte, naval commander, better known as Horatio Nelson, 1st Viscount Nelson
  - 2nd Duke of Bronte, clergyman, better known as William Nelson, 1st Earl Nelson
  - 3rd Duchess of Bronte, better known as Charlotte Hood, Baroness Bridport
  - 4th Duke of Bronte, general, better known as Alexander Hood, 1st Viscount Bridport
  - 5th Duke of Bronte, courtier, better known as Sir Alexander Hood
  - 6th Duke of Bronte, naval commander and politician, better known as Rowland Hood, 3rd Viscount Bridport
  - 7th Duke of Bronte, investment banker, better known as Alexander Hood, 4th Viscount Bridport

== Places ==
Australia

- Bronte, New South Wales, a suburb in the Municipality of Waverley
- Bronte Park, Tasmania, a locality in Central Highlands local government area

Canada

- Bronte, Ontario, a locality in the Regional Municipality of Halton
- Bronte Creek, a waterway in the Regional Municipality of Halton and City of Hamilton, Ontario
- Bronte Creek Provincial Park, a park in the Regional Municipality of Halton, Ontario
- Bronte GO Station, a transit station in the Regional Municipality of Halton, Ontario

England

- Brontë Country, an area mainly in the Metropolitan County of West Yorkshire
- Brontë Parsonage Museum, a museum in the Metropolitan County of West Yorkshire
- Brontë Waterfall, a waterfall in the Metropolitan County of West Yorkshire

Italy

- Bronte, Sicily, a comune in the Metropolitan City of Catania

New Zealand

- Bronte, New Zealand, a locality in Nelson Province, New Zealand

United States

- Bronte, Texas, a town in Coke County

== Other uses ==
- Brontë (play), a play by Polly Teale
- Brontë (lunar crater), a crater visited by Apollo 17 astronauts
- Brontë (Mercurian crater), a crater on Mercury
- Bronte (mythology), Greek personification of thunder
- "Bronte", a song by Gotye from the album Making Mirrors

== See also ==
- Brontes (disambiguation)
