= Brontosaurus (disambiguation) =

Brontosaurus is a genus of sauropod dinosaur.

Brontosaurus may also refer to:

== Music ==
- "Brontosaurus" (The Move song)
- "Brontosaurus" (Tkay Maidza song)
- "Brontosaurus" (They Might Be Giants song)
- A 2002 album by Da Vinci's Notebook

== Other ==
- 9949 Brontosaurus, a main-belt asteroid
- Hnutí Brontosaurus, an environmental movement in the Czech Republic
- Brontosaurus (play), a stage play by Lanford Wilson
- Brontosaurus rib, a type of short rib cut taken from beef or a similar animal
- Apatosaurus, a different, closely related genus of diplodocids that was once considered to be synonymous with Brontosaurus

== See also ==
- Bronto (disambiguation)
