= Brontes =

Brontes may refer to:

- Brontes, one of the Cyclopes of Greek mythology, whose name means 'thunder'
- Bronte, a minor Greek goddess associated with thunder
- Bronte, Sicily, town near Catania (Sicily); legacy of Brontes cyclops
- Brontë, family; notably:
  - Charlotte Brontë (1816–1855), English novelist and poet, the eldest of the three
  - Emily Brontë (1818–1848), English novelist and poet who is best known for her only novel, Wuthering Heights
  - Anne Brontë (1820–1849), English novelist and poet, the youngest member
- Brontes Technologies was a Lexington, MA startup company acquired in 2006 by 3M ESPE, 3M's dental division
- Brontes, codename of the JBoss Application Server version 7.1.1.Final
- Sky Brontes, a Czech paraglider design

== See also ==
- Bronte (disambiguation)
