= Andrea Cunningham =

American businessperson

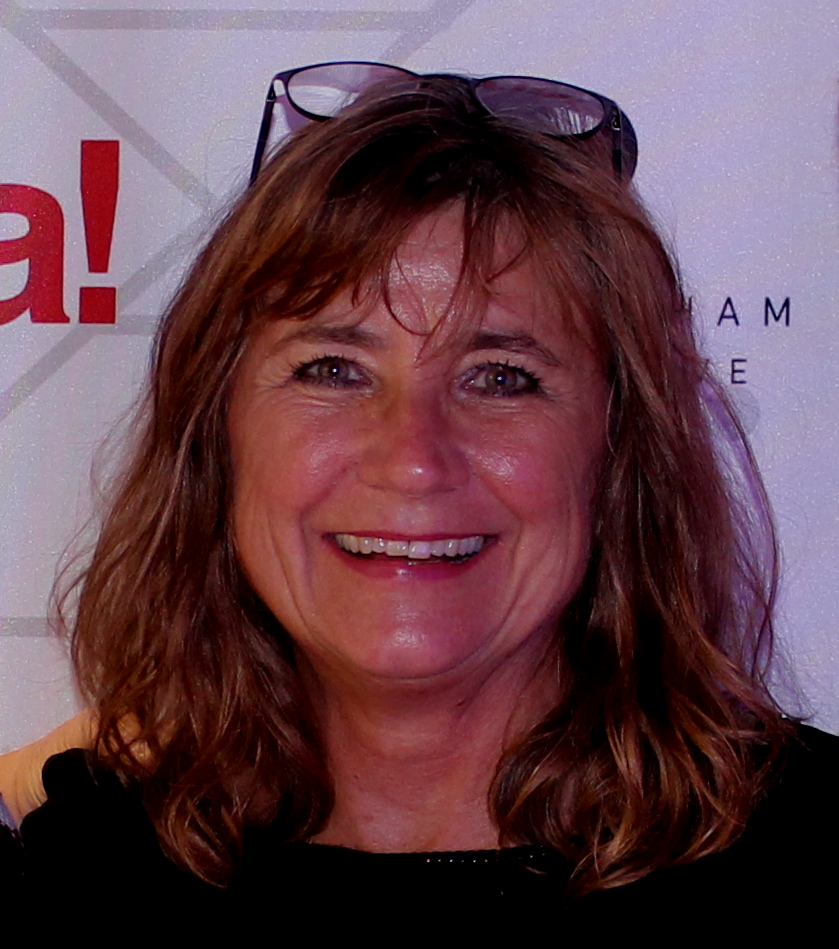
- Cunningham on 30 October 2017
- Born: Chicago, Illinois, U.S.
- Education: Northwestern University
- Occupation(s): Founder and President, Cunningham Collective
- Known for: Launching the Apple Macintosh; Founder of Cunningham Communication
- Spouse: Rand Siegfried
- Children: 2
- Website: Andy Cunningham

Andrea "Andy" Cunningham is an American strategic marketing and communications entrepreneur. She helped launch the Apple Macintosh in 1984 as a part of Regis McKenna, and founded Cunningham Communication, Inc. She is currently the President of Cunningham Collective, a brand strategy, marketing, and communications firm. Her book, Get to Aha! Discover Your Positioning DNA and Dominate Your Competition, was published in October 2017.

== Career ==
=== Early career ===
After graduating from Northwestern University in 1979, Cunningham started her career as a feature writer for Irving-Cloud Publishing Co. covering the trucking industry, but decided that she did not belong in that industry. She joined Burson-Marsteller in Chicago soon after, where she helped to launch the video game Asteroids for Atari, as well as the sweeteners Equal and NutraSweet for G.D. Searle.

=== Regis McKenna and the Apple Macintosh ===
In 1983, Cunningham moved to Silicon Valley, where she joined Regis McKenna and worked with Steve Jobs as a project lead on the launch of the Apple Macintosh. She collaborated with Jane Anderson to write the Macintosh launch plan. She continued to work with Apple as a client, helping them launch the desktop publishing category with Aldus Corporation and Adobe Systems. She contributed her experiences with Jobs to Walter Isaacson's biography of him and Aaron Sorkin's script for the film Steve Jobs, in which Sarah Snook portrays her.

=== Cunningham Communication ===
After leaving Regis McKenna in 1985, Cunningham founded Cunningham Communication, Inc., where she retained Jobs as a client for NeXT and Pixar. Her firm's work included launching RISC microprocessors for consumer personal computers with IBM and Motorola, very light jets with Eclipse Aviation, digital imaging with Kodak, and software-as-a-service with Hewlett-Packard. The firm was acquired in 2000 and renamed Citigate Cunningham.

=== CXO Communication ===
In 2003, Cunningham spun a new consultancy, CXO Communication, out of Citigate Cunningham and became CEO. Instead of focusing on traditional public relations and corporate communications, the CXO focused on brand strategy and positioning. Clients included AMD, Beautiful!, Cisco, Eclipse Aviation, Futuremark, Liveops, MarketTools, PivotPoint Capital, PRTM, RSA, UCSF, VantagePoint Venture Partners, and XOJet. She left the firm in 2010 to become CMO of Rearden Commerce, where she repositioned the company's solutions under the Deem brand.

=== Bite Communications ===
After leaving Rearden Commerce in the fall of 2011, Cunningham advised the Bite Communications executive team on a turnaround in North America. Soon after, she was asked to become President of Bite Communications North America. She was promoted on January 1, 2013 to become the CEO of Bite's worldwide operations. She resigned in June 2013 to focus on SeriesC.

=== Cunningham Collective (formerly SeriesC) ===
While Cunningham was advising the Bite Communications team, she began to assemble the group that eventually became SeriesC. SeriesC officially launched in the spring of 2012 with Cunningham retaining leadership positions in both SeriesC and Bite. The firm changed its name to Cunningham Collective in August 2015.

From April 2014 to August 2015, Cunningham was the interim Chief Marketing Officer of Avaya. Her tenure there was a Cunningham Collective engagement, as she continued to lead the firm during that period. She led the team that spearheaded the shift in positioning from collaboration to engagement, with an initial focus on Silicon Valley as a catalyst to revitalize awareness of Avaya to the broader tech audience. She also held an interim CMO role with Tendril and was an interim Chief Communications Officer with BlackBerry, all as Cunningham Collective engagements.

Cunningham is the author of the book Get to Aha!: Discover Your Positioning DNA and Dominate Your Competition.

== Boards and non-profit activities ==
Cunningham serves on the corporate boards of MixR(workplace community building software), Motiv Power Systems (electric vehicles), Onclusive, Specialized Bicycle Components(bicycles and related gear), and Woodward Communications, Inc. (media and marketing services). She has served as a trustee of the Aspen Institute since 2000 and Menlo College since 2014.

She also serves on the several not-for-profit advisory boards: UNICEF, Northwestern University's Medill School of Journalism, Media, Integrated Marketing Communications and ZERO1: The Art & Technology Network, an organization she founded in 2000 with the mission to shape the future at the intersection of art and technology. She also serves on the Freeman Design Council, a “special forces” unit of The Freeman Company.

In addition, she serves as an advisor to Traackr, an influencer marketing software company.

Cunningham's past board positions include RhythmOne (advertising technology), Finelite, Inc. (lighting design), YPO, CEO, Peninsula Open Space Trust (POST) and the Computer History Museum.

She is an Aspen Institute Henry Crown Fellow, and a member of WPO, CEO, TED and Women Corporate Directors. She has taught marketing classes at Carnegie Mellon University, Harvard University, New York University, Menlo College, Northwestern University, San Jose State University, Santa Clara University, Stanford University and the University of Southern California.

== Interviews and other mentions ==
- San Jose Mercury News, May 16, 1993. The Graying of Silicon Valley PC Mavericks Evolve Into 'Old Nerd' Network (Archived Article ID:9302060054)
- San Jose Mercury News, April 24, 1998. Where are S.J.'s Female-Owned Businesses? (Archived Article ID:9804250153)
- Bloomberg Television. October 2011. Apple Earnings, Business Outlook, iPhone. Retrieved May 28, 2013.
- FleishmanHillard TRUE. December 2014. Finding Avaya's Silicon Valley Cool. Retrieved February 23, 2015.
- The Economist. February 23, 2015. The Entrepreneurial CMOment: Something bigger. Retrieved February 23, 2015.
- Press: Here on NBC. May 1, 2015. Andy Cunningham. Retrieved May 2, 2015.
- Marketing Magazine. June 24, 2015. Steve Jobs' marketing maven on smashing the silicon ceiling. Retrieved June 24, 2015.
