= Zach Nelson =

American tech businessman

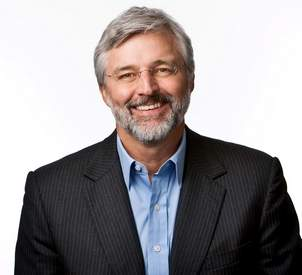
- Nelson, NetSuite CEO
- Born: Zachary A. Nelson; 1961 (age 64–65); Omaha, Nebraska, U.S.
- Occupations: President & CEO of NetSuite
- Known for: CEO of NetSuite
- Website: NetSuite.com

Zachary A. Nelson (born 1961) served as president and chief executive officer of NetSuite, Inc. prior to its acquisition by Oracle Corp.

== Early life and education ==
Nelson was born in Omaha, Nebraska in 1961, and was one of 10 children. He holds B.S. and M.A. degrees in biological sciences and anthropology respectively from Stanford University.

== Career prior to NetSuite ==
Nelson held a variety of executive positions in the high-tech industry, spanning marketing, sales, product development and business strategy with leading companies such as Oracle Corporation, Sun Microsystems, and McAfee/Network Associates.

Early in his career, Nelson was responsible for creating the "Powered by Motorola" ingredient brand for the Motorola 68000 microprocessor while he was working at Cunningham Communication.

At Sun, Nelson drove the marketing and branding of the first version of the Solaris operating system, and led the product and corporate marketing effort at the company's SunSoft Division. He was then Vice President, World Wide Marketing at Oracle Corp., where he was responsible for global marketing strategy and implementation. Nelson, at 31 years old, was the youngest VP of Marketing in Oracle's history.

While at McAfee, Nelson helped lead the company's expansion into the network management arena with the $1.4 billion acquisition of Network General. Later, as CEO of NAI subsidiary, myCIO, he created the world's first business-to-business security application services provider.

== NetSuite ==
CEO of NetSuite since 2002, Nelson led the company's successful IPO in December 2007 and its rise from startup to become one of the industry's leading cloud computing companies. During his tenure, NetSuite grew from a startup with annual sales of $1 million to revenue of $1 Billion in 2017 with a global customer base of approximately 24,000 mid-size and enterprise companies and subsidiaries. NetSuite's market capitalization was put at $7.8 billion as of March 2015 in an index of public cloud computing companies tracked by venture capital firm Bessemer Venture Partners.

Under Nelson, NetSuite released global business management software suite NetSuite OneWorld in 2008 and the B2C and B2B ecommerce platform NetSuite SuiteCommerce in 2012.

Nelson also spearheaded NetSuite's acquisition of commerce marketing software company Bronto in 2015 social HR player TribeHR in 2014 and of OrderMotion, Retail Anywhere and Venda in 2013.

In 2016, NetSuite reached a $1 billion run rate. NetSuite was acquired by Oracle for $9.3 billion on November 7, 2016, making it the third largest software company acquisition by enterprise value in the industry.

== Influence and honors ==
Nelson has won multiple awards and received many accolades in his career including being named to CRN's 25 Most Influential of 2014 list, which highlights individuals who made the largest impact on the technology industry in the year. Nelson was also named to 2013 Business Insider's 50 Most Powerful People in Enterprise Tech list, and to Fortune magazine's 2012 Businessperson of the Year list. Under Nelson's leadership, NetSuite was named to Forbes Most Innovative Growth Companies 2014 list and to Forbes America's 100 Most Trustworthy Companies 2013.

== Venture Capital ==
Nelson is an active and successful investor in the technology, media, entertainment and hospitality sectors. Nelson was also an early investor in the evolution of on-line media sites. He was a seed investor in Curbed.com, a popular real estate blog network with sites in New York, San Francisco and Los Angeles that was acquired by Vox Media. Nelson is a director of the PagerDuty Board. Nelson also holds two other board roles. He serves as a director on the board of Freshworks. Most recently, he is appointed to the board of directors at Snyk. He is active in the golfing industry including an ownership stake in Dumbarnie Links, a new golf course designed by Clive Clark on the Firth of Forth near St. Andrews.

== Additional background ==
Nelson holds a software patent that covers a method for integrating software applications and codifying them into a single architecture.
