= The Bay Lights =

San Francisco public art project

- Artist: Leo Villareal
- Year: 2013
- Medium: Light sculpture
- Dimensions: 1.8 miles (2.9 km) cm (1.1 miles in); 25,000 LEDs
- Location: San Francisco; 37.8003°N 122.3758°W
- Owner: State of California

A test conducted on January 24, 2013

Opening on March 6, 2013

A time lapse image of Market Street, with The Bay Lights in the background

The Bay Lights is a site-specific monumental light sculpture and generative art installation on the western span of the San Francisco–Oakland Bay Bridge, designed to commemorate the 75th anniversary of its opening. The installation by light artist Leo Villareal included 25,000 individual white LEDs along 1.8 miles (2.9 km) of the cables on the north side of the suspension span of the bridge between Yerba Buena Island and San Francisco. The installation was controlled via a computer and displayed changing patterns that were not meant to repeat. The opening ceremony was held on March 5, 2013.

Initially intended as a temporary installation, which ended on March 5, 2015, the project was re-installed as a longstanding feature of the Bay Bridge with permanent fixtures that were re-lit on January 30, 2016. After an extended run, the lights were turned off on March 5, 2023. The lights were turned on again featuring a ceremony on March 20, 2026.

== Origin ==
The Bay Lights was conceived in September 2010 by Ben Davis of Words Pictures Ideas, a public relations company contracted by the California Department of Transportation (Caltrans) to publicize the construction of the new eastern span replacement of the Bay Bridge between Yerba Buena Island and Oakland. Davis characterized the Bay Bridge as being overshadowed by the Golden Gate Bridge, which is a popular tourist destination for visitors to San Francisco, and he hoped this art project would give the Bay Bridge more recognition. Davis contacted light artist Leo Villareal, who had an exhibition on display at the San Jose Museum of Art in late 2010. Davis later founded Illuminate the Arts, a non-profit organization, to organize the sculpture's design, engineering, and fundraising. WordPress founder Matt Mullenweg was an early financial supporter of the project.

Both Davis and Villareal suggest The Bay Lights was influenced by their experiences at the annual Burning Man art and music festival in northwestern Nevada. Villareal first attended Burning Man in 1994 and eventually joined the board of directors of the Burning Man organization. His prototype light sculpture was 16 blinking lights in a grid that was meant to be a beacon when returning to his camp at night. From there, Villareal has programmed more complex light matrices and exhibitions, including his largest by light count, Multiverse, a 41,000 LED installation on permanent display at the National Gallery of Art in Washington, DC.

== Operations ==
The sculpture was visible mostly from the north side of the bridge and was most easily seen from the San Francisco waterfront. The lights were positioned to be invisible to bridge motorists, to prevent driver distractions. The installation operated from dusk until dawn daily.

=== Installation ===
The 25,000 white LEDs were attached by construction workers along the vertical steel support cables that connect the deck of the bridge to the suspension cables at the top. Caltrans workers intermittently closed a lane of traffic on the bridge late at night so electricians could install the individual LEDs to the cables. The lights were programmed to create a series of abstract patterns that ascend and descend the cables and appear to cross the bridge. Villareal described the patterns as inspired by water, traffic, and local weather patterns.

The lights needed 100,000 feet (30,000 m) of special cabling to power the installation, as well as for networking and communications with the control computer. The lights were spaced every 12 inches (30 cm) and were attached to the bridge with 60,000 zip ties. Each LED bulb could be adjusted for 255 different levels of brightness and the entire installation was controlled remotely by a computer program operated by Villareal. The LED lights complement the permanent string of lights that has been attached to the suspension cables since the 50th anniversary of the bridge in 1986.

The original, temporary installation, which formally opened on March 5, 2013, was taken down in March 2015 when its permits expired so that Caltrans could repaint and perform maintenance on the cables. Installation of more robust, permanent lights began in October 2015, and a re-lighting ceremony was held on January 30, 2016, after which the lights were gifted to the state of California. The new lights were brighter and better able to weather the elements and angled such that they are visible from south of the bridge as well. By 2023, the work had dark patches where bulbs needed replacement with the LEDs failing faster than they could be repaired. The lights were turned off on March 5, 2023 – a victim of the harsh conditions on the bridge and on San Francisco Bay. As of 2023, an $11M fundraising effort is underway to return the lights, with $1 million donated each from WordPress founder Matt Mullenweg, WhatsApp founder Jan Koum and Parnassus Investments founder Jerry Dodson. The new version, known as Bay Lights 360, is set to be illuminated in March 2025.

The new installation started, but in December 2024, technical failures led to delays. 50,000 LED lights are planned to be installed. Iowa-based Musco Sports Lighting is in charge of the installation.

=== Cost ===
The initial project cost $8 million, which was raised through private donations and contributions. 50 million people were estimated to see The Bay Lights by 2015, and the project was estimated to bring up to $100 million in tourism revenue to the Bay Area. ZERO1, a non-profit dedicated to bringing art and technology together, signed on as the official fiscal sponsor of the project.

The Bay Lights is estimated to use approximately $30 per day in electricity, or about $11,000 annually. During the temporary installation period, these costs were covered by a private solar investment company in the form of solar credits.

In July 2014, Illuminate the Arts announced it was partnering with Tilt.com to sponsor a $1.2 million crowdfunding campaign to keep The Bay Lights lit until 2026. When the crowdfunding campaign raised less than expected, organizers focused on larger donors and ultimately raised the $4 million necessary to install long-term fixtures. The Bay Area Toll Authority, which oversees the bridge, agreed in 2014 to allocate up to $250,000 per year from toll revenues for maintenance and electricity.

== Critical reception ==
Since its inauguration, The Bay Lights has received widespread public support and positive reaction, as well as political support from state and local politicians, including Governor Jerry Brown, Lieutenant Governor Gavin Newsom, San Francisco Mayor Ed Lee, the San Francisco Board of Supervisors and former San Francisco Mayor Willie Brown.

Hemispheres named The Bay Lights the top attraction in its 2013 "Out with the Old, In with the New" Top-25 feature.

On March 8, 2014, the documentary Impossible Light world premiered at the SXSW Film Festival. The film follows the people who wished to produce The Bay Lights as they search for funding and obtain permits. The Austin Chronicle felt that the documentary was a nearly seamless extraction of the evolutionary relationship between art and benefaction. The film also screened as part of the 57th San Francisco International Film Festival and the Newport Beach Film Festival in April 2014.

== See also ==
- Illuminated River, another Villareal bridge-based installation
