= Illuminated River =

Public artwork on London's bridges

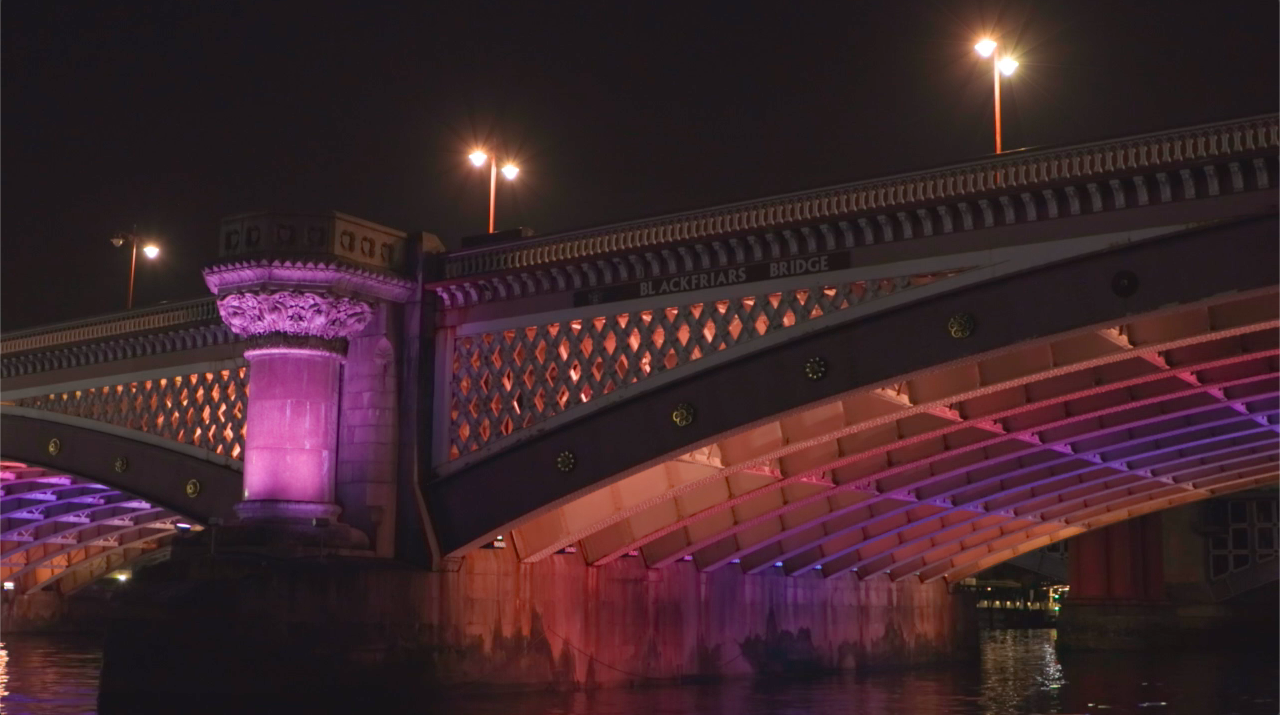
Blackfriars Bridge with Illuminated River

Illuminated River is a large-scale public art commission which lights up nine bridges in central London across the River Thames. Designed by American artist Leo Villareal in collaboration with British architects Lifschutz Davidson Sandilands, it uses LED light fittings to produce sequenced patterns of moving light across the bridge structures.

At 3.2 miles (5.1 km) in length, it is one of the world’s longest ever public art commissions. The first phase – Southwark Bridge, Millennium Bridge, London Bridge and Cannon Street Bridge – was launched on 17 July 2019. It was completed in April 2021 with the illumination of Blackfriars Bridge, Waterloo Bridge, Golden Jubilee Footbridges, Westminster Bridge and Lambeth Bridge. The installation has a minimum lifespan of 10 years.

== Origins ==
In 2016, an international competition was launched to design a public light artwork in Central London across bridges on the River Thames. A design by American artist Leo Villareal, in collaboration with British architects Lifschutz Davidson Sandilands was selected from 105 entries by a jury in November 2016. Sarah Gaventa was appointed as Director of the Illuminated River Foundation to lead on the delivery of the project.

== Installation ==
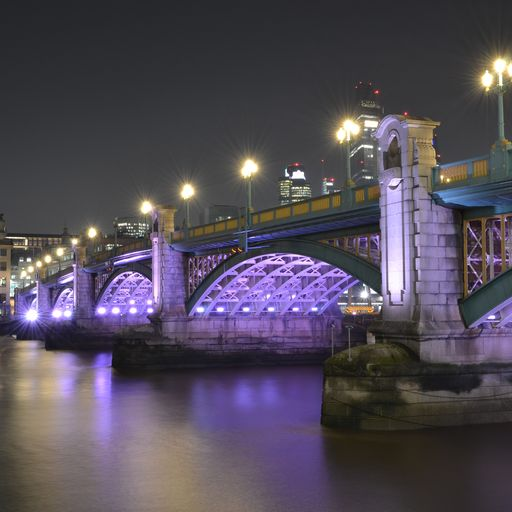
Southwark Bridge with Illuminated River

Led by the Illuminated River Foundation, the project involved the collaboration of statutory bodies, local authorities and communities. The Illuminated River project team submitted 30 planning applications and 18 applications for listed building consent. Illuminated River is the UK’s biggest single planning application made without an act of parliament. The project was developed in consultation and collaboration with the bridge owners: Bridge House Estates, Network Rail, Westminster City Council and Transport for London; and numerous stakeholder organizations, including the Port of London Authority, Historic England, London Wildlife Trust, Zoological Society of London and Cross River Partnership.

Before installation, a luminance survey of the Thames was carried out from Albert to Tower Bridge using a calibrated camera and specialist software to document the brightness distribution of the bridges and their surroundings. The survey allowed the project team to target a luminance level for the artwork on each bridge, minimise light spill and save energy. This was partly achieved by replacing outdated lighting and introducing new light fittings with two custom elements: ‘One is a blade that can be angled to shield light from falling onto the water, and the other improves pedestrian comfort along the banks by reducing glare’.

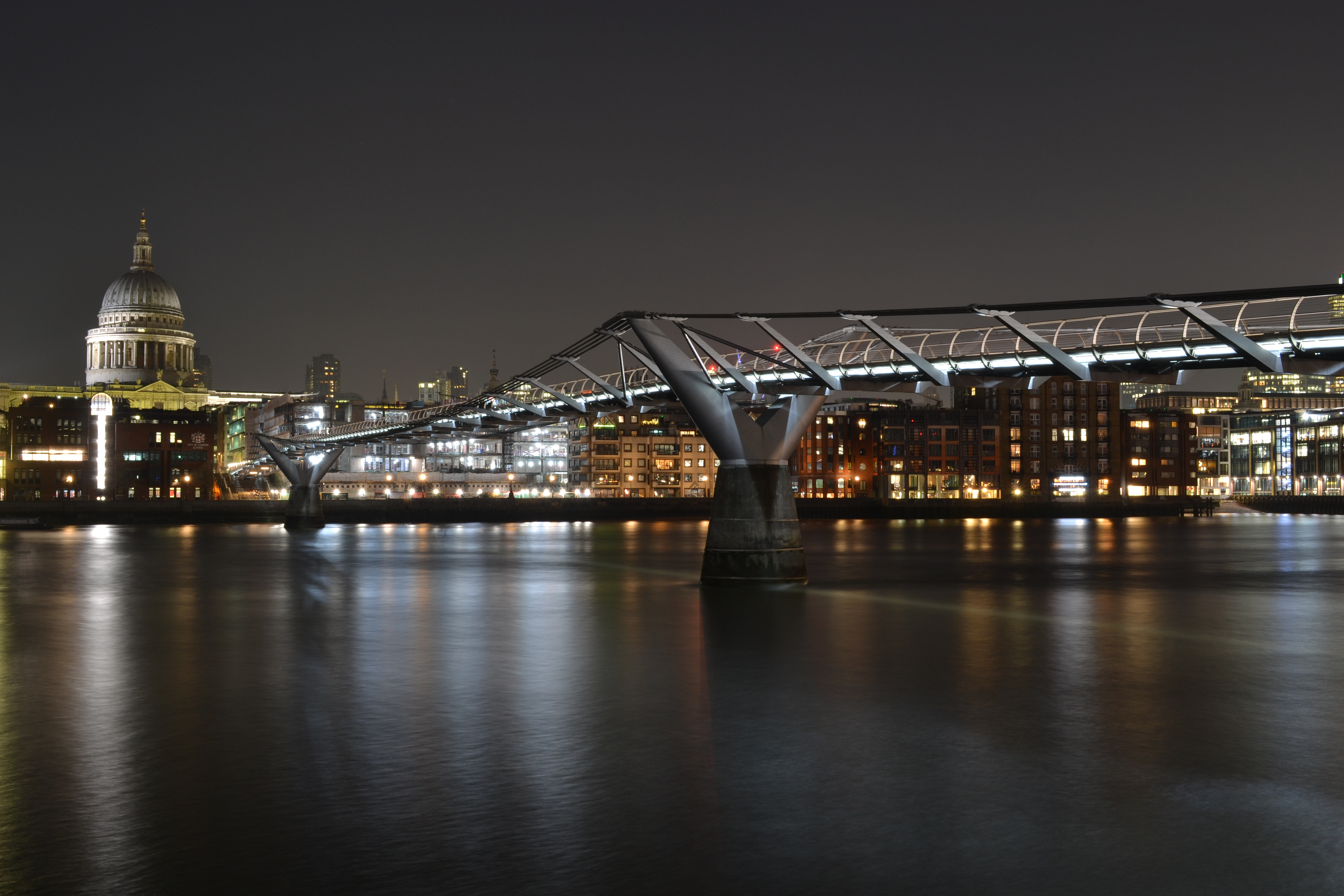
Millennium Bridge with Illuminated River

Environmental impact assessments – documenting the impact of light at night on Thames wildlife – were produced to support the project’s planning applications. A river bird breeding assessment was carried out by the London Wildlife Trust and a river bat activity survey was conducted by Thomson Environmental Consultants. The data collected was used to reduce the impact of the artwork on natural habitats and increase its sensitivity to the environment.

In the first phase of the project, the installation of bridge lighting over the river Thames required specialist construction workers, “abseilers with electrical engineering degrees”.

Following the completion of the first phase, the Mayor of London Sadiq Khan, commented:

"I am delighted that Illuminated River is bringing more free and accessible artwork to Londoners. The Thames has played a key role in the growth and development of our capital for centuries, and this unique artwork will help Londoners and visitors see it in a whole new way. The Illuminated River will celebrate the unique architecture and heritage of our bridges, showcase creativity, boost life at night and transform the way we think about the Thames."

The installation of the second phase started in July 2020. In an interview with Illuminated River contractor’s FM Conway, published in New Civil Engineer, it is stated that “...the second phase included the installation of around 4,000 light fittings, 15km of power and fibre optic cabling and cable trays, as well as approximately 250,000 fixings.” The proximity to existing railway infrastructure required negotiation with Network Rail.

The Chair of the Illuminated River Foundation, Neil Mendoza, said: “The project was completed on time despite the difficulties of COVID-19 and funded, almost in its entirety, by philanthropists.”

The project won a Royal Town Planning Institute Award for Planning Excellence in 2021.

== Design ==
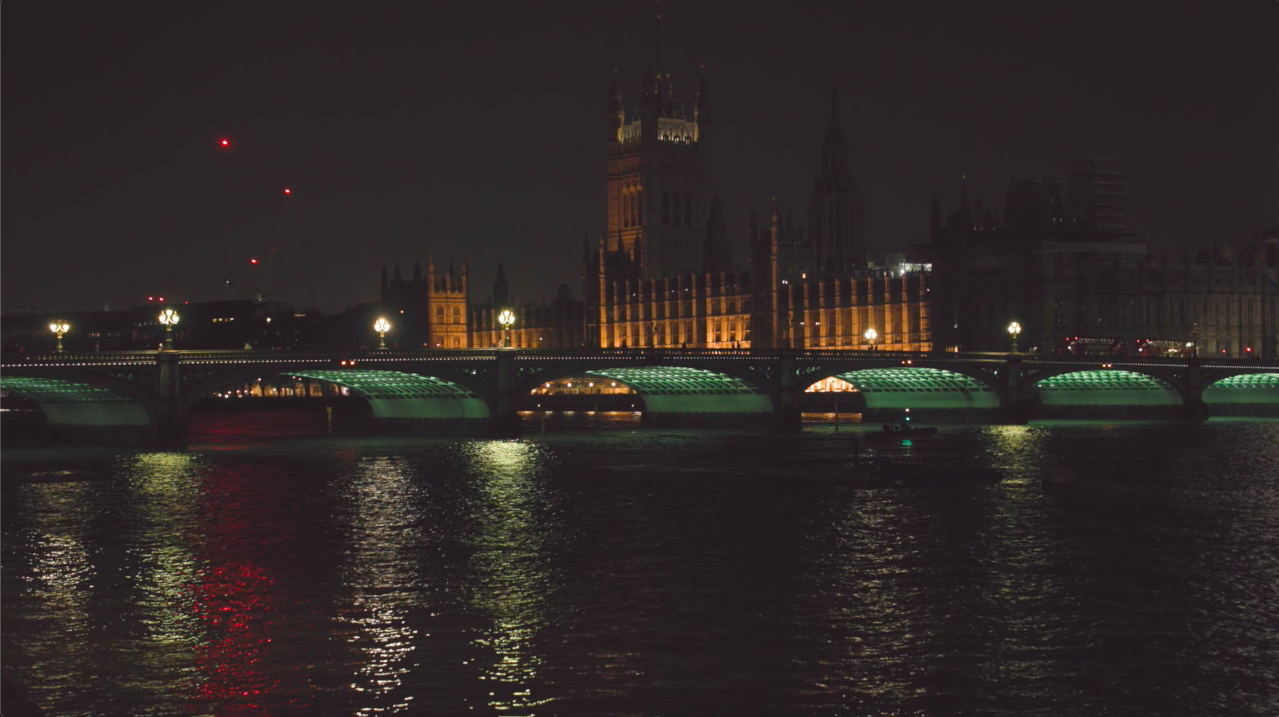
Westminster Bridge with Illuminated River

Hungerford Bridge and Golden Jubilee Bridges lighting

Designed by Leo Villareal with British architects Lifschutz Davidson Sandilands and lighting designers Atelier Ten, Illuminated River employs LEDs and custom fittings to produce sequenced patterns of light across the Thames bridge structures. The patterns of movement continually change and avoid repetition.

The installation’s colour scheme is influenced by impressionist paintings of the Thames: “The colours and tones used in the paintings of those inveterate Thames-watchers Monet, Whistler and Turner provide some of the inspiration, while at Westminster [Bridge] a shade of green was chosen to complement the colour of the leather upholstery in the House of Commons”.

Leo Villareal described how he intended the artwork to respond to the historical and current context of the site:

The palette I chose for Lambeth and Westminster bridges reflect the colours of the seats in their respective parliamentary chambers. For Waterloo, I have enhanced either side with the stretch of light and introduced pastel washes of colour to illuminate its central spine. Blackfriars Road Bridge is now awash with warm, rosy hues that cite the remaining columns of the now removed old railway bridge. The Golden Jubilee Footbridges have now featured a kinetic, monochromatic lighting scheme that mirrors the artwork on Millennium Bridge, the only other footbridge in the body of work.

Before his commission for Illuminated River in 2016, Villareal completed The Bay Lights in 2013, a site-specific monumental light installation on the western span of the San Francisco–Oakland Bay Bridge.

== Funding ==
The project was funded by the Rothschild Foundation, Blavatnik Family Foundation, Reuben Foundation and Arcadia Fund, and received seed funding from the Mayor of London, Sadiq Khan, for £250,000.

== Media appearances ==
On 31 December 2020, Illuminated River formed part of the Mayor of London’s New Year’s Eve lighting and fireworks display, which incorporated Thames landmarks such as The Shard, Tower Bridge and The O2. The bridges were illuminated with the Union Jack and NHS blue, to pay tribute to the frontline staff and key workers during the Covid-19 pandemic. The ten-minute-long show was broadcast live on BBC One.

A three-part Channel 4 documentary, London’s Great Bridges: Lighting the Thames which aired in July 2019, covered the project up to the launch of the first phase.

== Community projects ==
Centre for London’s ‘Lighting London’ research project “exploring how London could make better use of lighting to create a more attractive and sustainable cityscape after dark”, published in March 2021, highlighted the transformative effect of Illuminated River on some of the city’s greatest assets and how new lighting can be “sensitively integrated into an already heavily lit urban context”.

Audio-descriptions of the Illuminated River bridges for visually impaired people were developed in collaboration with sight-loss charity VocalEyes.

Marshalls Landscape Protection donated three benches to the Illuminated River project in 2019. These were installed on the South Bank to allow more people to sit and view the artwork.

A community fund was launched in 2019 to help local groups engage in the project with activities that: ‘encourage more people to enjoy the Thames, its bridges and riverside surroundings at night’.

Free Illuminated River walking tours were offered to staff from Guy's and St Thomas' NHS Foundation Trust during the Covid-19 pandemic.

Illuminated River boat tours run by Uber Boat by Thames Clippers and led by the City of London Guides provided cheap access to the Thames.

== Awards ==
The project has received awards from organizations including: Civic Trust Awards; British Construction Industry Awards; New London Architecture; The Maritime Foundation; The Waterfront Center; The Planning Awards; LONDON Design Awards and the Royal Town Planning Institute.
