= ZERO1: The Art and Technology Network =

American art nonprofit (founded 2000)

ZERO1
- ZERO1: The Art and Technology Network
- Founded: 2000
- Founders: Andrea Cunningham and Beau Takahara
- Location: Silicon Valley
- Executive Director: Shamsher Virk
- Program & Communications Manager: Maya Holm
- Board of directors: Andrea Cunningham (Founder and Board Chair), Gordon Knox (Treasurer), Anna Sidana (Secretary)
- Website: zero1.org

cZERO1: The Art and Technology Network is an American nonprofit organization founded in 2000.

== History ==
ZERO1 was launched by Andrea Cunningham as an initiative focused on projects at the intersection of art and technology.

Between 2006 and 2012, ZERO1 was the producer of ZERO1 Biennial, a multidisciplinary, multi-venue event of visual and performing arts, the moving image, public art, and interactive digital media.

== ZERO1 Biennial ==
Since its establishment in 2006, the ZERO1 Biennial has presented works of more than 650 artists from more than 60 countries through exhibitions, public art installations, performances, and speaker events.

The inaugural 2006 Biennial, held in conjunction with the International Society for Electronic Arts, brought over 20,000 people to San Jose for a week. It featured 250 art installations representing 40 countries. The 2006 Biennial yielded nearly 100 media stories, including a full-page spread in the Sunday New York Times. A media report described the event as "North America's newest and largest digital arts biennial".

From June 4 to 8, 2008, over 25,000 attendees visited 100 art installations, more than 25 performances, workshops, and public talks by over 100 artists from more than a dozen countries at exhibitions held throughout downtown San Jose. Students from seven continents participated in a global youth digital arts exhibition. The biennial commissioned 19 works, of which 3 were the result of a FUSE: CADRE/Montalvo Artist Research Residency Initiative, and supported an additional 29 projects.

In September 2010, there were over 47,000 visitors and over 100 artists, designers, engineers, filmmakers, musicians, architects, and avant-garde creators from 21 countries. Led by ZERO1 Artistic Director Steve Dietz, Assistant Curator Jaime Austin, and ZERO1's Executive Director Joel Slayton, the 2010 ZERO1 Biennial featured works by David Rockwell and The Lab, Brody Condon, Natalie Jeremijenko, Rigo23, Todd Chandler, Blast Theory, and others.

The 2012 Biennial invited more than 150 artists from 13 countries to present works, collaborating with local, regional, national, and international cultural institutions, along with Silicon Valley companies, to showcase 3 months of exhibitions, events, and performances. The core Biennial exhibition, also called Seeking Silicon Valley, was curated by 5 international curators and included 24 international artists from 11 countries, including 18 commissions. 51 biennial projects were installed in public space; 28 of those public art projects were for (e)MERGE, the ZERO1 Street Festival, which engaged 86 collaborating artists.

=== Bay Lights ===
The Bay Lights is a light sculpture celebrating the 75th anniversary of the San Francisco Bay Bridge by artist Leo Villareal. The sculpture measures approximately 1.8 miles in width and 500 feet in height and incorporates 25,000 individually programmed LED lights, controlled by algorithms and programmed patterns displayed across the bridge’s western span. ZERO1 was invited to be the fiscal sponsor and contracted with Illuminate the Arts to provide fiscal stewardship for the world's largest light sculpture and currently the nation's largest public art project.

== Programs ==
=== American Arts Incubator ===
ZERO1, in partnership with the U.S. State Department's Bureau of Educational and Cultural Affairs (ECA), launched a new media and mural arts program called the American Arts Incubator. Inspired by the "business incubator" model, made popular by Silicon Valley's technology and start-up companies, the American Arts Incubator is a hybrid training lab, production workshop, and tool for public engagement.

The selected U.S. artists team up with youth and underserved populations, through country-based partnerships, to inspire ideas for community engagement through art programs. American Arts Incubator awards micro-grants to community-driven digital media or mural arts projects proposed by artist teams who live in each overseas community.

=== ZERO1 Fellowship ===
The ZERO1 Fellowship program was developed as a platform for artistic experimentation. Working in collaboration with partner companies, cultural institutions, and academic research centers, ZERO1 Fellows were asked to develop lines of artistic research and cultural production in response to a challenge. ZERO1 Fellows participated in cross-sector collaboration and problem-solving while utilizing new technology, resources, and knowledge provided by sponsors.

=== ZERO1 Garage ===
In 2012, ZERO1 launched the Garage to complement the Biennial as the organization's next phase. The Garage's design by architect Chris Has received a 2013 Merit Award from the AIA San Francisco's Design Award Program. Part research lab, part exhibition center, the ZERO1 Garage was both a physical space and a conceptual platform where exhibitions, artist talks, panels, and symposia could take place for the next three years.

== See also ==
- C2SV
