= PSA Bronto =

CJSC PSA Bronto

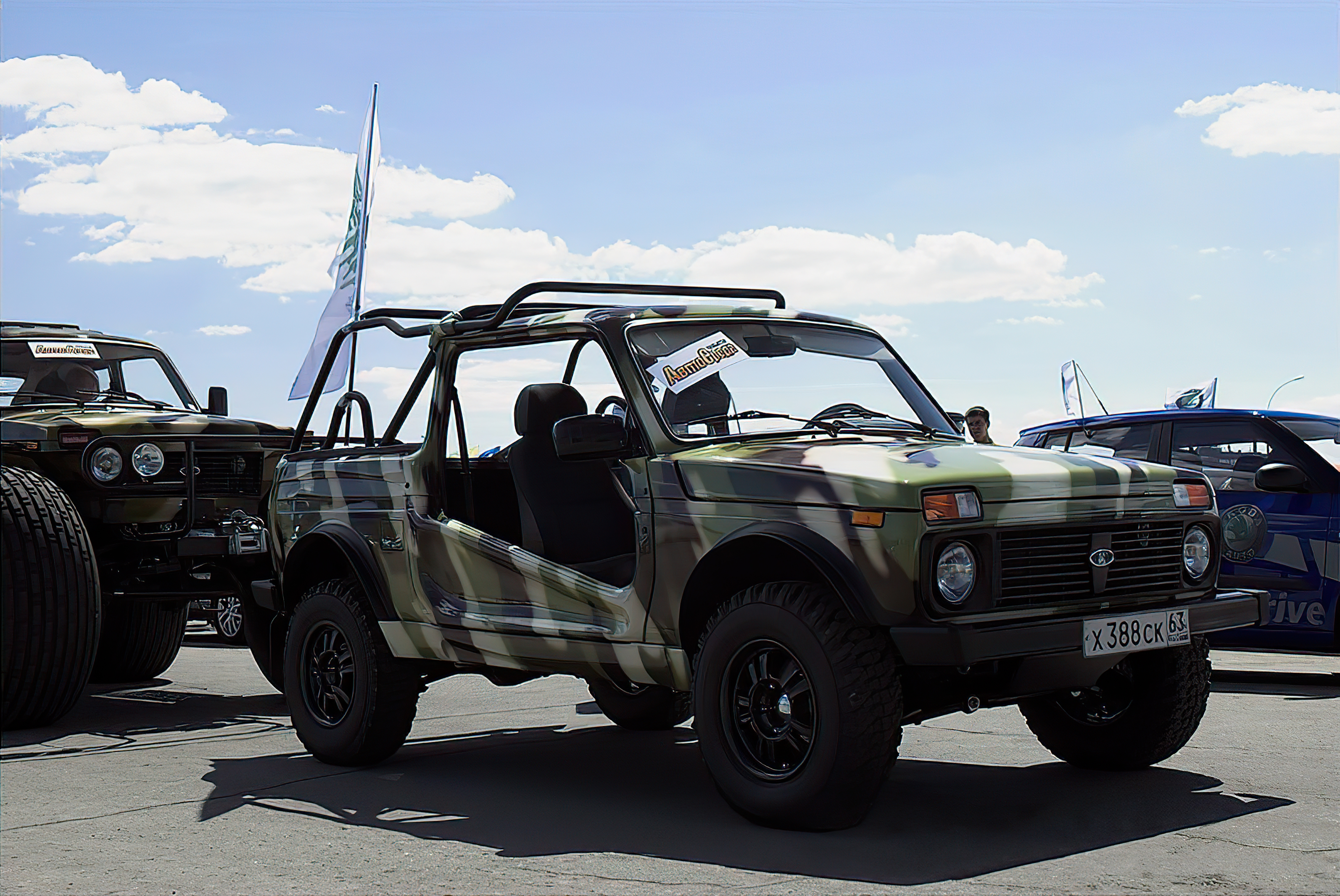
- Bronto Landole
- Native name: ОАО ПСА "БРОНТО"
- Industry: Automotive
- Founded: 1993
- Defunct: 1 January 2015
- Fate: Partially merged into VIS-AUTO, Bronto badging still used
- Headquarters: Tolyatti, Russia
- Products: Swamp buggy, Off-road vehicle, Armored car
- Website: www.bronto-psa.ru

PSA Bronto (Russian: ПСА Бронто) was a Russian company focused on the production of special vehicles and SUVs. It was established in 1993 and closed in 2015. While in operation, it was closely associated with AvtoVAZ. The Bronto badging is still used.

== History ==
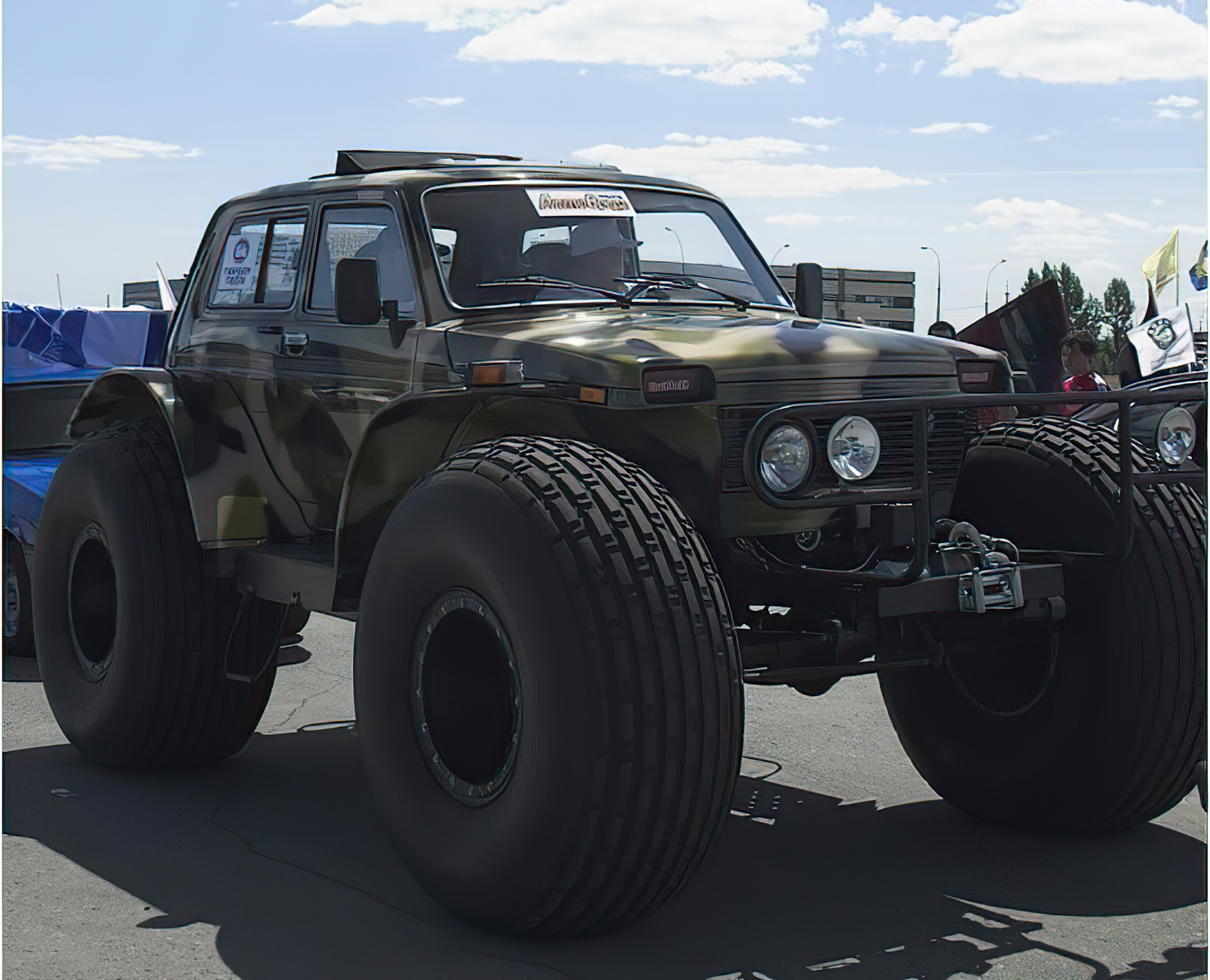
Lada Bronto Marsh-1

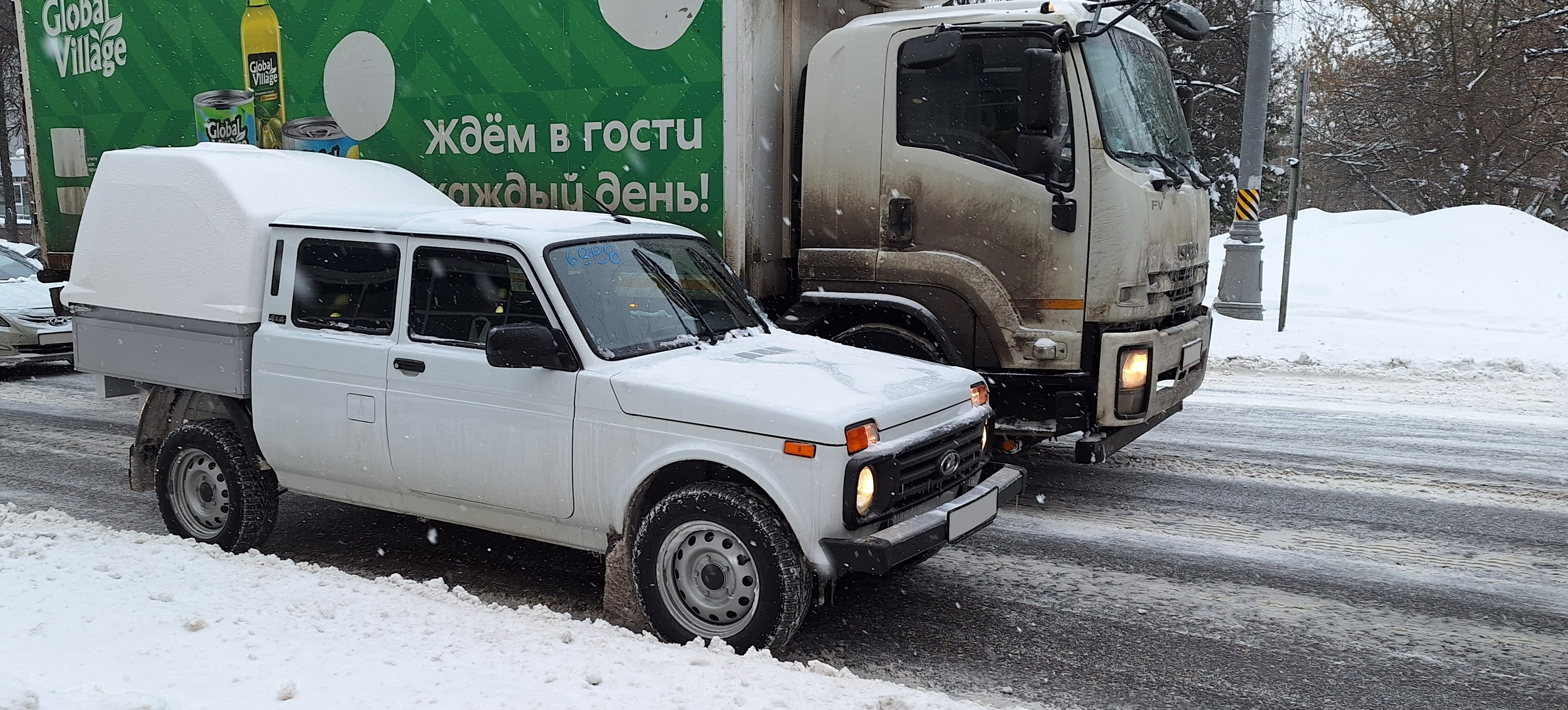
Bronto Ryus`

In 1993, the car company PSA Bronto was established as part of the AvtoVAZ research center for the production of special armored vehicles and SUVs on the platform of the Lada Niva. The following year, more than 200 copies of this model were sold, which allowed the company to begin work on new projects.

Lada Bronto Marsh-1 (1922-00) was one of the few mass-produced vehicles on massive balloon tires. Developing the model of AvtoVAZ's leading engineer, Pyotr Prusov, the company created the all-terrain vehicle Marsh-1, a swamp buggy vehicle, which became a real sensation at the auto show held in Moscow in 1995. This car is designed to work in specific conditions that are associated with overcoming marshy swamps, deep snows, sand dunes. Its first copies went to Surgut and Nadym. In 2002, more than 30 SUVs 192200 "March" were purchased by the government of Yakutia.

In 1996, the cooperation of PSA Bronto with Sberbank of Russia began, for which the company manufactured 500 cash armored vehicles. Having continued in new modifications in 2002 on the Nadezhda platform "Bronto-212090" and on the Lada Niva platform "Bronto-213102". In 2004, the Bronto-194900 model was released on the Chevrolet Niva platform for collection.

In 2002, on the platform of the Lada Nadezhda and Lada Niva, a modification of the Marsh-2 all-terrain vehicle was created. Its interior allowed eight passengers to comfortably accommodate: two people were placed in the front seats, and six - in the rear. At the same time, the rear seats were quickly transformed into sleeping ones, which made it possible to transport patients and victims. The car was equipped with two fuel tanks of 70 liters each, and its design made it possible to install VAZ gasoline and diesel power units on a car. The first customers of the new modification were JSC Centrenergo RAO UES of Russia.

In 2005, PSA Bronto launched the "Landole" open car based on the Niva, designed by Sergey Samoilov. The company also developed an electric car prototype, "Brontokar".

In 2009, PSA Bronto introduced a new SUV in camouflaged army paint, on the Niva Lynx platform, which was continued in the Niva-Lynx1, Niva-Lynx2 and Niva-Lynx3 series. The latest Lynx-3 series is also known as the Niva Bronto 213102-771-40 Force Comdiv.

In 2012, VIS-AUTO absorbed PSA Bronto. The PSA Bronto company was officially dissolved on 1 January 2015.

== Continuing usage of the Bronto badging ==
In 2021, AvtoVAZ announced a new Bronto-badged vehicle as a top trim for the Lada Niva Legend. VIS-AUTO and AvtoVAZ partnered on production, with the former taking charge of main assembly and the latter of welding and painting.
