= PRTM =

Management consulting business

- Type: Subsidiary of PwC
- Industry: Management consulting
- Founded: 1976
- Headquarters: Waltham, Massachusetts, U.S. 19 offices in 10 countries
- Key people: Scott Hefter, Global MD; Mary Lyons, Chief Talent Officer; Mark Strom, MD, Americas; Mohamed Kande, MD Europe, ME and South Asia; Susan Kantor, CFO; Tom Godward, Director, Transactions
- Services: Management consulting services: Operational strategy, product and service innovation, supply chain innovation, customer experience innovation, enterprise co-creation
- Website: www.prtm.com

PRTM is a management consulting business established in 1976, and now part of PwC. PRTM's capabilities centered on the areas of operational strategy, supply chain innovation, product innovation, and customer experience innovation.

PRTM was specialized in these industry sectors: automotive, aerospace and defense, chemicals and process industries, telecommunications, consumer goods and retail, electronics, energy, financial services, healthcare, private equity, public sector, semiconductor, and software.

== History ==
The firm was founded in 1976 in Palo Alto, California. When the firm added eastern United States operations in 1977, it was incorporated as Pittiglio, Rabin, Todd & McGrath after its founding partners Theodore Pittiglio, Robert Rabin, Robert Todd, and Michael McGrath. Today, the firm is known as PRTM. The firm began benchmarking business performance for its clients in 1982. PRTM's international expansion started in 1985.

In 1988, PRTM created the "Product and Cycle-time Excellence" (PACE) framework to provide companies with a multidisciplinary approach to innovation. PRTM co-developed the "Supply-Chain Operations Reference-model" (SCOR) with the Supply-Chain Council in 1996. In 1997, the firm launched a subsidiary, The Performance Measurement Group, LLC (PMG).

On June 24, 2011, PricewaterhouseCoopers (PwC) acquired PRTM and the deal closed on August 22, 2011.

== Bibliography ==
- Making Innovation Work: How to Manage It, Measure It, and Profit From It (by Tony Davila, Marc J. Epstein, and Robert Shelton, Wharton School Publishing, 2005, ISBN 0-13-149786-3),
- Strategic Supply Chain Management: The Five Disciplines for Top Performance (by Shoshanah Cohen and Joseph Roussel, McGraw-Hill, 2004, ISBN 0-07-143217-5),
- Strategic IT Portfolio Management (by Jeffrey Kaplan, PRTM, 2005, ISBN 0-9766093-0-4),
- Next Generation Product Development: How to Increase Productivity, Cut Costs, and Reduce Cycle Times (McGraw-Hill, 2004),
- Setting the PACE in Product Development: A Guide to Product And Cycle-time Excellence (by Michael E. McGrath, Butterworth-Heinemann, rev. ed. 1996, ISBN 978-0-7506-9789-7),
- Voices into Choices: Acting on the Voice of the Customer (by Gary Burchill and Christina Hepner Brodie, Joiner Associates, 1997, ISBN 1-884731-13-9),
- Product Strategy for High-Technology Companies: How to Achieve Growth, Competitive Advantage, and Increased Profits, (by Michael McGrath, McGraw-Hill, 2nd ed., 2000, ISBN 0-07-136246-0).
