= Bronto Software =

Defunct American e-commerce software company

Oracle Bronto
- Type: Subsidiary
- Founded: 2002; 24 years ago North Carolina, United States
- Founders: Joe Colopy; Chaz Felix
- Defunct: May 31, 2022; 4 years ago
- Headquarters: Durham, North Carolina, U.S.
- Services: Marketing automation Email marketing E-commerce
- Number of employees: 400 (2018)
- Parent: NetSuite
- Website: bronto.com

Bronto Software, later called Oracle Bronto, was an American software company founded in 2002 which was acquired by NetSuite in 2015. The company provided marketing automation software to mid-market and enterprise organizations. In March 2021, Oracle NetSuite announced that Bronto's suite of products were to be retired, with all services being discontinued on May 31, 2022.

== History ==
In 2002, Joe Colopy and Chaz Felix founded Bronto Software in Durham, North Carolina. Joe Colopy chose to name the company after the brontosaurus because of his childhood interest in dinosaurs.

In 2011, Bronto Software expanded its office space to accommodate business growth. In March 2012, Bronto opened an office in London to develop business growth in Europe.

In 2011, Bronto grew with a 54% increase in revenue and team growth of 40%, finishing the year with 118 employees. In September 2012, Bronto was named the leading self-service email provider and the second overall leading email service provider according to the Internet Retailer Top 1000. After 2012, Bronto had 152 employees and offices in Durham, NC, and London, UK. Bronto Software expanded operations in February 2014 by opening an office in Sydney, Australia.

In April 2015, NetSuite (now Oracle NetSuite, after Oracle acquired Netsuite in 2016) signed an agreement to acquire Bronto Software for $200 million.

In March 2021, Oracle NetSuite sent an email to some customers with the news that the company had assigned the core product suite, Bronto Email Marketing Platform, to “end of life” status and shut down all services on May 31, 2022.

== Products and services ==
The Bronto Marketing Platform included functionality allowing users to build flowcharts for advertisement campaigns, automate campaigns and report on the results. The platform allowed users to publish advertising via email, SMS, Twitter and Facebook campaigns. The platform included an API for custom integrations and included preset integrations with select services, including Magento, Omniture, Google, and Demandware.
