= Regis McKenna =

American marketer

- Born: Pittsburgh, Pennsylvania
- Education: Saint Vincent College; Duquesne University
- Occupation: Marketer
- Known for: Marketing the first Intel microprocessor and first personal computer Founder of Regis McKenna, Inc.

Regis McKenna (born 1939) is an American marketer in Silicon Valley. He and his namesake firm Regis McKenna, Inc. helped market the first microprocessor (Intel Corporation), Apple's first personal computer (Apple Computer), the first recombinant DNA genetically engineered product (Genentech, Inc.), and the first retail computer store (The Byte Shop).

Among the entrepreneurial start-ups with which he worked during their formative years are America Online, Apple, Compaq, Electronic Arts, Genentech, Intel, Linear Technology, Lotus, Microsoft, National Semiconductor, Silicon Graphics, and 3Com. He has been described as the man who put Silicon Valley on the map. He has been called "Silicon Valley's preeminent public relations man", a "guru", a "czar", a "philosopher king", a "legendary marketer", Apple's "marketing guru", "the fellow that put Intel and Apple on the map", and "a pioneer in the semiconductor business in terms of the marketing side of things". Newsweek called him "the Silicon Valley Svengali" and Business Week has called him "one of high-tech's ace trendspotters" and a "marketing wizard in Silicon Valley".

A 1985 Los Angeles Times remarked, "McKenna is best known for taking the story of Apple Computer's founding in a Los Altos garage by two young entrepreneurs and weaving it into part of our national folklore."

== Education and early career ==
Born and raised in Pittsburgh, Pennsylvania, McKenna attended Saint Vincent College and was a liberal arts graduate of Duquesne University. He later said that he "had a dispute with the university over credits" and that Duquesne "eventually sent me my degree." However "I went to four different universities to get that degree." He ended up receiving an honorary Ph.D. from Duquesne in 1990.

He first went to Silicon Valley in 1962, where he worked in the marketing department of General Microelectronics, a spinoff of Fairchild that started developing MOS technology. He then worked as marketing services manager for National Semiconductor in 1967, a firm that proliferated. He spent "half of my time on the road... in Europe and other places around the world... helping set up operations in Scotland." He said there that he learned a great deal about marketing simply by doing it.

McKenna wrote a 2001 article entitled "Silicon Valley Isn't a Place as Much as It Is an Attitude." Describing the Valley as "this near-mythical garden became the place where anyone could pursue and achieve his or her heart's delight," he said that its early "inventors and entrepreneurs...didn't set out to achieve wealth or even happiness" but "sought the freedom to exercise their talents free of economic, cultural, or tenure constraints." The result was the unplanned evolution of a "new, egalitarian culture."

== Regis McKenna, Inc. ==
In late 1969, McKenna left National and began to seek work as a marketing freelancer, helping Silicon Valley startups "with everything from research to training." He put together a "marketing plan," including a list of "the top ten companies" he wanted to work with, and ended up having them all as clients. The list included Intel, Spectra-Physics, Teledyne, and Systron Donner.

McKenna founded Regis McKenna, Inc. in 1970. He went on to work for Intel and then Apple. He later recalled that "Apple wasn't happy with the name Apple after they started growing. They looked at IBM and said, 'We don't look like IBM. We're not, you know, dignified.'" McKenna made a two-hour presentation to Apple's employees in which he said: “That's exactly what you do want. You want to be different from IBM. You don't want to be the same. You don't want to emulate them. You want to do all of the things that distinguish you from them.”

He began working with Apple in 1976. That year, Steve Jobs and Steve Wozniak "approached him and asked for help in launching what was to be the world's first personal computer." He agreed because he "liked Apple's vision." A 2012 article explains, "When a young Steve Jobs needed a marketing expert, he called Intel to ask who made their sharp-looking ads and was told 'Regis McKenna'".

In addition to marketing consultancy, McKenna also owned an advertising agency and a public relations company. "So not only did we write their first business plan, we also designed the Apple logo and put together their advertising campaigns."

McKenna has said that the biggest mistake of his career was turning down an offer of 20% of Apple stock in lieu of payment for his services. "I was looking at my cash flow. And that's one of the reasons why I turned down Apple's offer." His letter turning down the offer is on display at Apple's headquarters.

McKenna sold his advertising business to Jay Chiat in 1981 and his PR business in 1995.

McKenna came out of retirement to work on the iPhone 4 antenna crisis. "Steve called me from Hawaii and told me he had a big problem," McKenna later explained. "He asked if I would meet him at Apple the next day...I thought it was a media-cycle issue and that they should address it with the data they had and be confident about the outcome rather than be apologetic. That's what Steve did. The issue vanished within probably ten days."

McKenna felt that Walter Isaacson's book about Jobs was "very negative...I never once had any of those confrontations that people talk about, and I knew him since he was 22 years old."

Aside from Intel and Apple, among the startups that the firm assisted in their formative years included America Online, Electronic Arts, Genentech, National Semiconductor, Silicon Graphics, and 3Com Corporation. Over the years, the firm evolved from a high-tech outsourced marketing business focusing on startups to a broad-based marketing strategy firm servicing international clients in many industries. McKenna sold his interest in the firm in 2000.

Andrea Cunningham, the firm's group account manager for Apple, told the Los Angeles Times in 1985, "This agency knows more about Apple Computer than Barbara Krause (Apple's in-house public relations chief)."

McKenna wrote in 1990, "Technology is transforming choice, and choice is transforming the marketplace. As a result, we are witnessing the emergence of a new marketing paradigm.” In a 2002 article, he declared that “branding (as currently practiced) is dead.”

A 2012 article entitled “How Regis McKenna Defined Real-Time Marketing” explained that real-time marketing “is a way of thinking and philosophy that requires businesses to meet the demands of an always-on digital world” and that “includes the convergence of search, social, and real-time content production and distribution, with an expanded definition of publishing that makes social conversation and interaction as important as actual writing and digital media development.” McKenna, it was explained, “laid the groundwork for real-time marketing back in 1995” in a paper for the Harvard Business Review, and fleshed out the concept in the 1997 book Real Time.

== Kleiner Perkins Caufield and Byers ==
In 1986 McKenna became a partner of the venture capital firm Kleiner Perkins Caufield & Byers.

== Memberships ==
McKenna is an investor and board member of several Silicon Valley firms, including BroadWare Technologies, Golden Gate Software, and Nanosys. He is on the advisory board of Xloom. He is also on the International Advisory Board of Toyota Motor Company, and the Advisory Board of the Economic Strategies Institute. He is a founding member and chairman of the board of Advisors for the Santa Clara University Center for Science, Technology, and Society and a trustee of the University. He and his wife, Dianne, are founders and trustees of the Children's Fund of Silicon Valley. He is also on the advisory boards of the Technology, Innovation & New Economy Project of the Progressive Policy Institute and the Tech Museum.

== Retirement ==
Since his retirement from active consulting in 2000, McKenna has lectured about many topics, such as “the social and market effects of technological change.”

== Books ==
- Total Access, Giving Customers What They Want in an Anytime, Anywhere World, Harvard Business School Press, 2002. The book “addresses the future of marketing as computers and the network do most of the work, from data gathering to customer care and response.”
- Real Time, Preparing for the Age of the Never Satisfied Customer, Harvard Business School Press, 1997. This book “analyzes the effects of technology on the marketplace and describes how high-speed electronics enables ready access to information, products, and services and, in the process, generates increased expectations for immediate satisfaction.” The New Yorker wrote, “McKenna never ceases to challenge the conventional wisdom. The notion of eliminating hierarchy and long-term planning, and creating realtime management that focuses on delivery, results, and customer needs is a key revelation for companies; large and small.” The Wall Street Journal called the book a “magnificent tour through an exciting if uncertain future in which everybody's connected to everybody.”
- Relationship Marketing, Addison-Wesley, 1991. Publishers Weekly described it as a “spirited recap of the 1980s” that “traces the rise and occasional fall of many start-up companies in the turbulent, proliferating computer and software industry, including the competition between Apple Inc. and IBM.”
- Who's Afraid of Big Blue, Addison-Wesley, 1989. This book “chronicles the strategies for success against industry giants and offers advice to those who want to challenge IBM, and to those who face similar competition in other industries.” Library Journal called it “an interesting three-pronged look at the behemoth of the computer industry.”
- The Regis Touch, New Marketing Strategies for Uncertain Times, Addison-Wesley, 1985. In this book, McKenna “shares for the first time his proven strategies for creating new markets, positioning products, gaining recognition, serving customers, and keeping pace with fast-changing environments.”

== Articles ==
McKenna has written many articles for Forbes, Ink, Fortune, and the Harvard Business Review. He has also written poetry.

== Honors and awards ==
McKenna won the Joseph Wharton Award in 1986. He received honorary Ph.Ds from Duquesne University (1990), Saint Vincent College (1991), Santa Clara University (2002), and Stevens College of Engineering (2002).

In 1991, he won the International Computers & Communications World Leaders Award.

The San Jose Mercury News included McKenna on its Millennium 100 list, a roster of the 100 people who made Silicon Valley what it is today.
