= 9949 Brontosaurus =

Asteroid

- Orbit of Brontosaurus (blue), with the inner planets and Jupiter (outermost)

Discovery
- Discovered by: E. W. Elst
- Discovery site: La Silla Obs.
- Discovery date: 22 September 1990

Designations
- Pronunciation: /ˌbrɒntəˈsɔːrəs/
- Named after: Brontosaurus (sauropod dinosaur)
- Alternative designations: 1990 SK_{6} · 1978 GT_{1} 1985 DM_{1} · 1992 BS
- Minor planet category: main-belt · (inner)

Orbital characteristics
- Epoch 4 September 2017 (JD 2458000.5)
- Uncertainty parameter 0
- Observation arc: 38.98 yr (14,236 days)
- Aphelion: 2.4982 AU
- Perihelion: 2.2105 AU
- Semi-major axis: 2.3544 AU
- Eccentricity: 0.0611
- Orbital period (sidereal): 3.61 yr (1,319 days)
- Mean anomaly: 322.53°
- Mean motion: 0° 16^{m} 22.08^{s} / day
- Inclination: 7.7036°
- Longitude of ascending node: 29.841°
- Argument of perihelion: 174.63°

Physical characteristics
- Dimensions: 4.231±0.086 km 17 km
- Geometric albedo: 0.248±0.010
- Absolute magnitude (H): 13.8

9949 Brontosaurus, provisional designation 1990 SK_{6}, is a stony asteroid from the inner regions of the asteroid belt, roughly 10 kilometers in diameter. It was discovered on 22 September 1990, by Belgian astronomer Eric Elst at ESO's La Silla Observatory in northern Chile. It was named after Brontosaurus, a genus of dinosaur.

== Orbit and classification ==
Brontosaurus orbits the Sun in the inner main-belt at a distance of 2.2–2.5 AU once every 3 years and 7 months (1,319 days). Its orbit has an eccentricity of 0.06 and an inclination of 8° with respect to the ecliptic. It was first identified as 1978 GT_{1} at Crimea–Nauchnij in 1978, extending the body's observation arc by 12 years prior to its official discovery observation at La Silla.

== Physical characteristics ==
=== Diameter and albedo ===
According to the surveys carried out by the Infrared Astronomical Satellite IRAS and NASA's Wide-field Infrared Survey Explorer with its subsequent NEOWISE mission, Brontosaurus measures 17 and 4.231 kilometers in diameter, respectively. WISE/NEOWISE also gives an albedo of 0.248 for the body's surface. It has an absolute magnitude of 13.8.

=== Rotation period ===
As of 2017, the asteroid's rotation period and shape remain unknown.

== Naming ==
This minor planet was named after Brontosaurus, a gigantic quadruped sauropod dinosaurs, which walked on all four legs and lived in the Upper Jurassic. Adult individuals measured up to 20 meters and had a weight of up to 20 tons. Many Fossils have been found in the United States. Brontosaurus is one of the best-known dinosaurs. The official naming citation was published by the Minor Planet Center on 20 November 2002 (M.P.C. 47166).
