= Leo Villareal =

American artist (born 1967)

- Born: 1967; Albuquerque
- Education: Yale University; New York University Tisch School of the Arts
- Occupations: Installation artist, sculptor, digital artist
- Notable work: Hive (Bleecker Street)
- Spouse: Yvonne Force Villareal
- Website: villareal.net

Leo Villareal (born 1967) is an American artist. His work combines LED lights and encoded computer programming to create illuminated displays. He lives and works in New York City.

== Early life and education ==
Villareal was born in 1967 in Albuquerque, New Mexico, and raised in El Paso on both sides of the US/Mexico border. He graduated from Portsmouth Abbey School in 1986. He received a BA degree in Sculpture from Yale University in 1990 and a graduate degree from New York University Tisch School of the Arts, in the Interactive Telecommunications Program (ITP).

== Career ==
The decisive moment that started his career came in Nevada's Black Rock desert during the 1997 Burning Man festival, when Villareal rigged up a strobe-light array above his tent so that he could find it more easily.

On March 5, 2013, Villareal debuted his largest piece to that date, The Bay Lights, a public light installation consisting of 25,000 LEDs strung on the vertical cables of the San Francisco-Oakland Bay Bridge. The installation cost $8 million to install and was activated nightly through 2015. It was replaced in 2016 with a permanent version.

In July 17, 2019, the first stage of his Illuminated River project went live with lighting added to London Bridge, Southwark Bridge, Millennium Bridge, and Cannon Street bridges. Phase Two added Blackfriars Bridge, Waterloo Bridge, Westminster Bridge, Lambeth Bridge, and the Golden Jubilee Bridges, and was completed in April 2021.

His piece Optical Machine I was featured in The Miami Beach Edition hotel during the 2019 Art Basel art fair. His piece Liminal Gradient for (RED) was displayed at the 2018 (RED) auction.

Villareal has been represented by Pace Gallery since 2016.

== Installations ==
Villareal is in the collections of the Museum of Modern Art (MoMA) in New York, the Renwick Gallery and the National Gallery of Art in Washington, D.C., the Brooklyn Museum of Art, and the Albright-Knox Art Gallery in Buffalo, New York, as well as in the private collections of contemporary art collectors CJ Follini. His work has also been on display at the Hirshhorn Museum and Sculpture Garden in Washington, D.C., Madison Square Park in New York City, the Los Angeles Museum of Contemporary Art, the PS 1 Contemporary Art Center in Long Island City, New York, The Northpark Mall in Dallas, and Brooklyn Academy of Music.

Installations by Villareal
Year	Project name	Location	Material	Notes
2008	Multiverse	National Gallery of Art, East and West Buildings, Washington D.C.		
2010	Sky	Tampa Museum of Art, Tampa, Florida	LED-studded aluminium veil for the Museum	
2013–2023	The Bay Lights	San Francisco-Oakland Bay Bridge, California		western section of the 7.1 km Bay Bridge linking San Francisco to Oakland
2016	Light Matrix	Auckland Theatre Company, Auckland, New Zealand		illuminated three-storey facade of the Auckland Theatre Company
2019– 2021	Illuminated River	London, England		creative lighting on 15 of the bridges of the River Thames in central London
2023–	Infinite Composition	Lindemann Performing Arts Center, Providence, Rhode Island		illuminated panels of white LEDs that flow in a variety of patterns in lobby of the performing arts center of Brown University
2025–	Bay Lights 360	San Francisco-Oakland Bay Bridge, California		

== Gallery ==
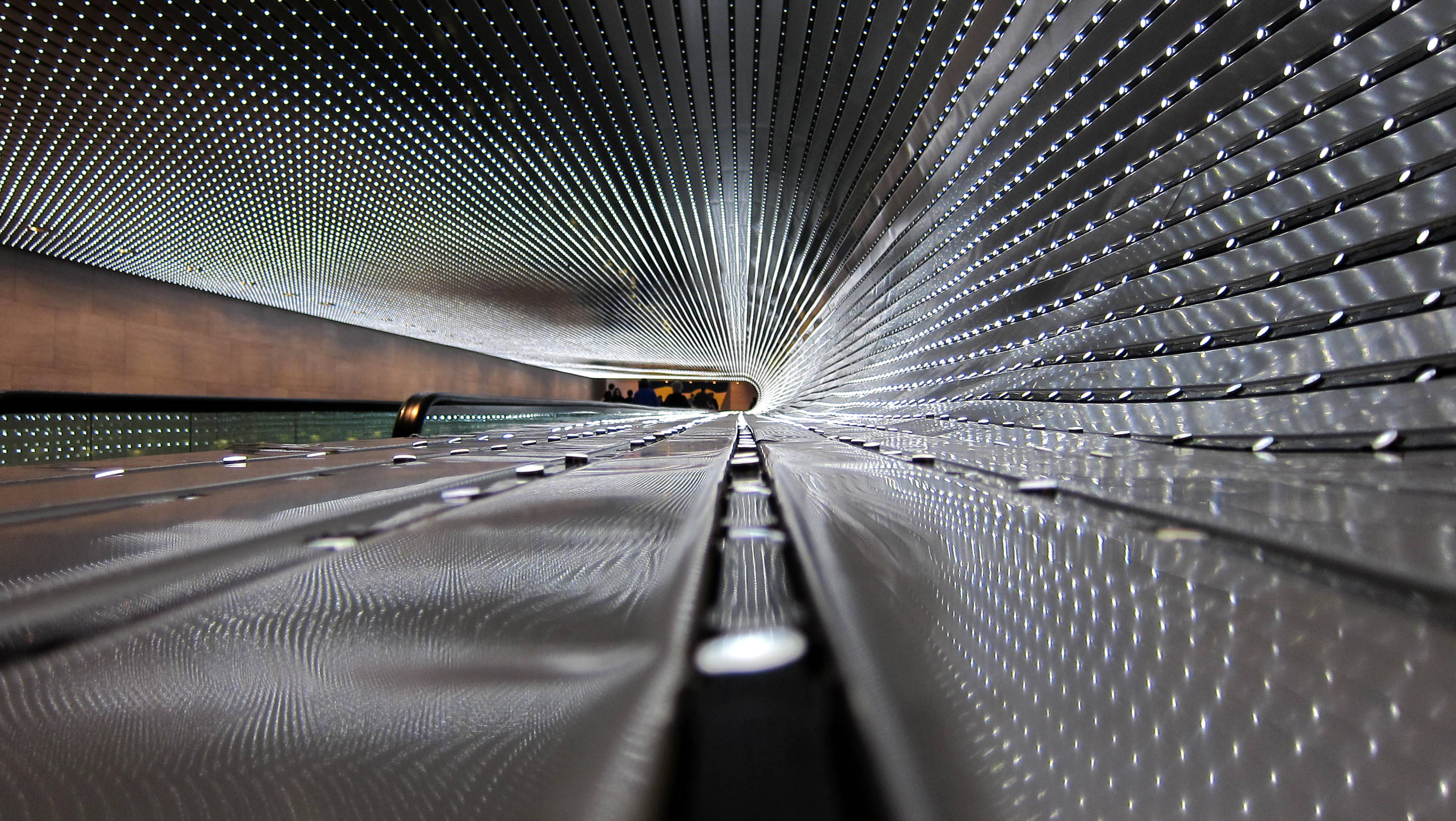
Multiverse, 2008, light sculpture, National Gallery of Art, Washington DC

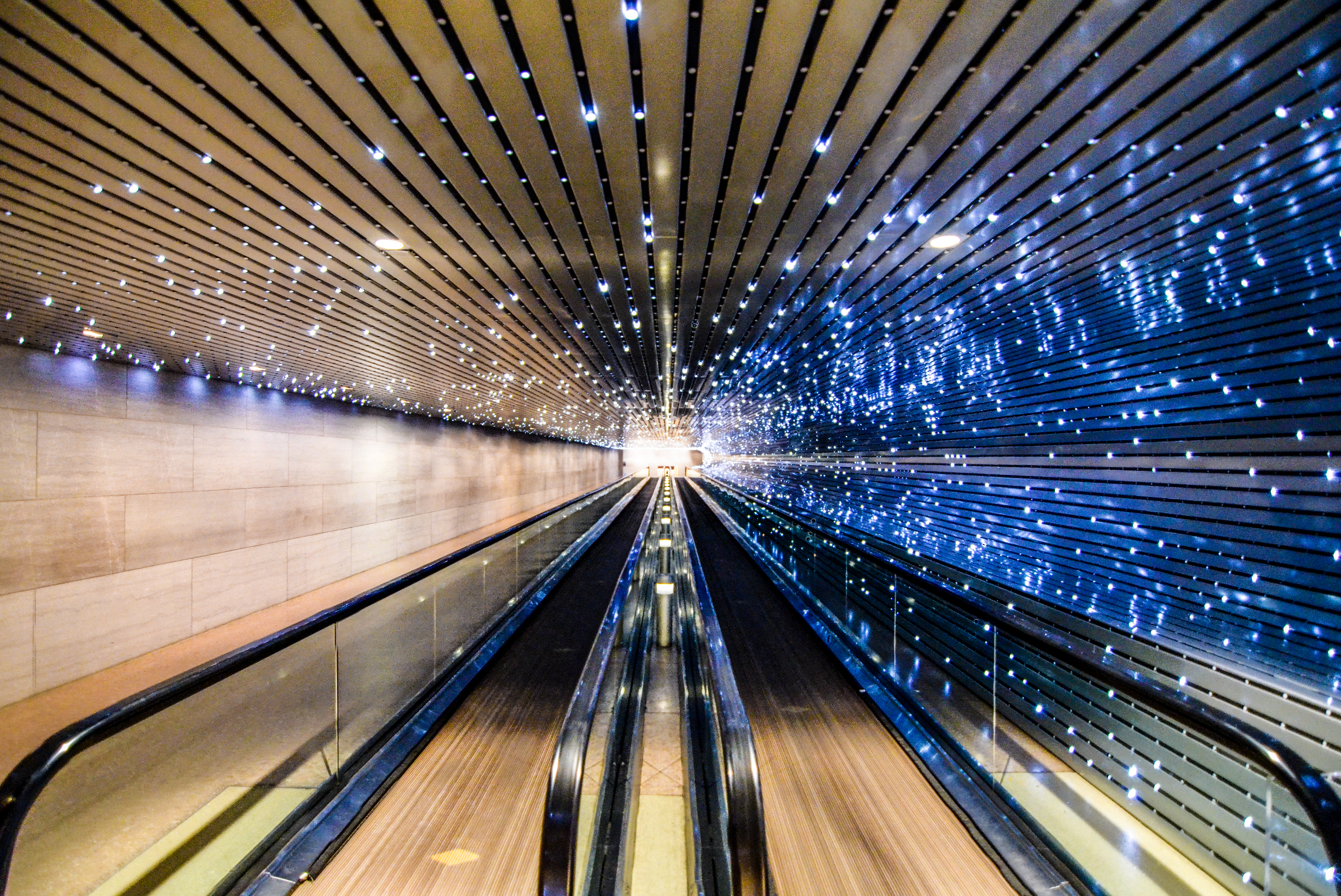
Multiverse, 2008, light sculpture, National Gallery of Art, Washington DC

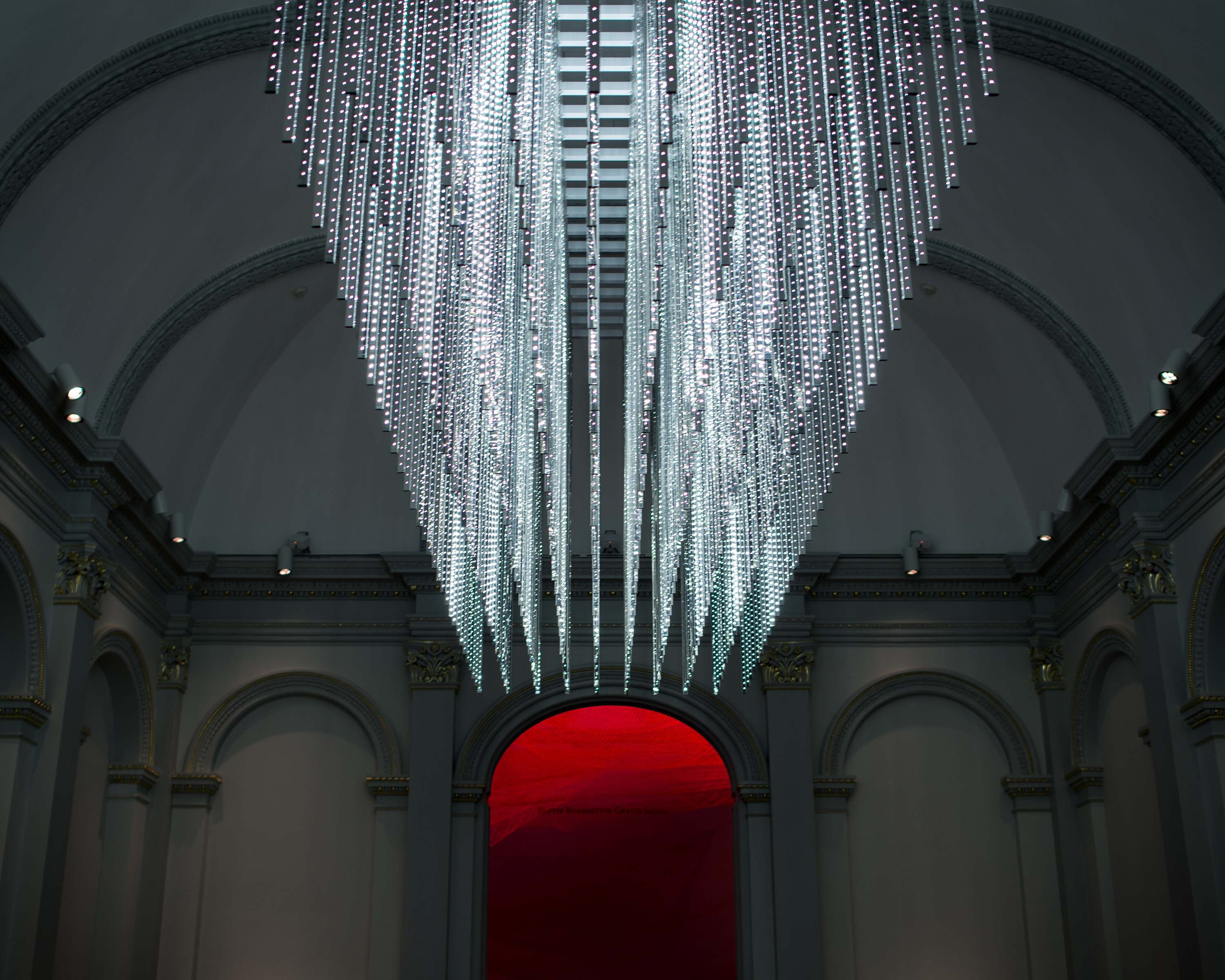
Volume, 2015, Renwick Gallery, Washington DC

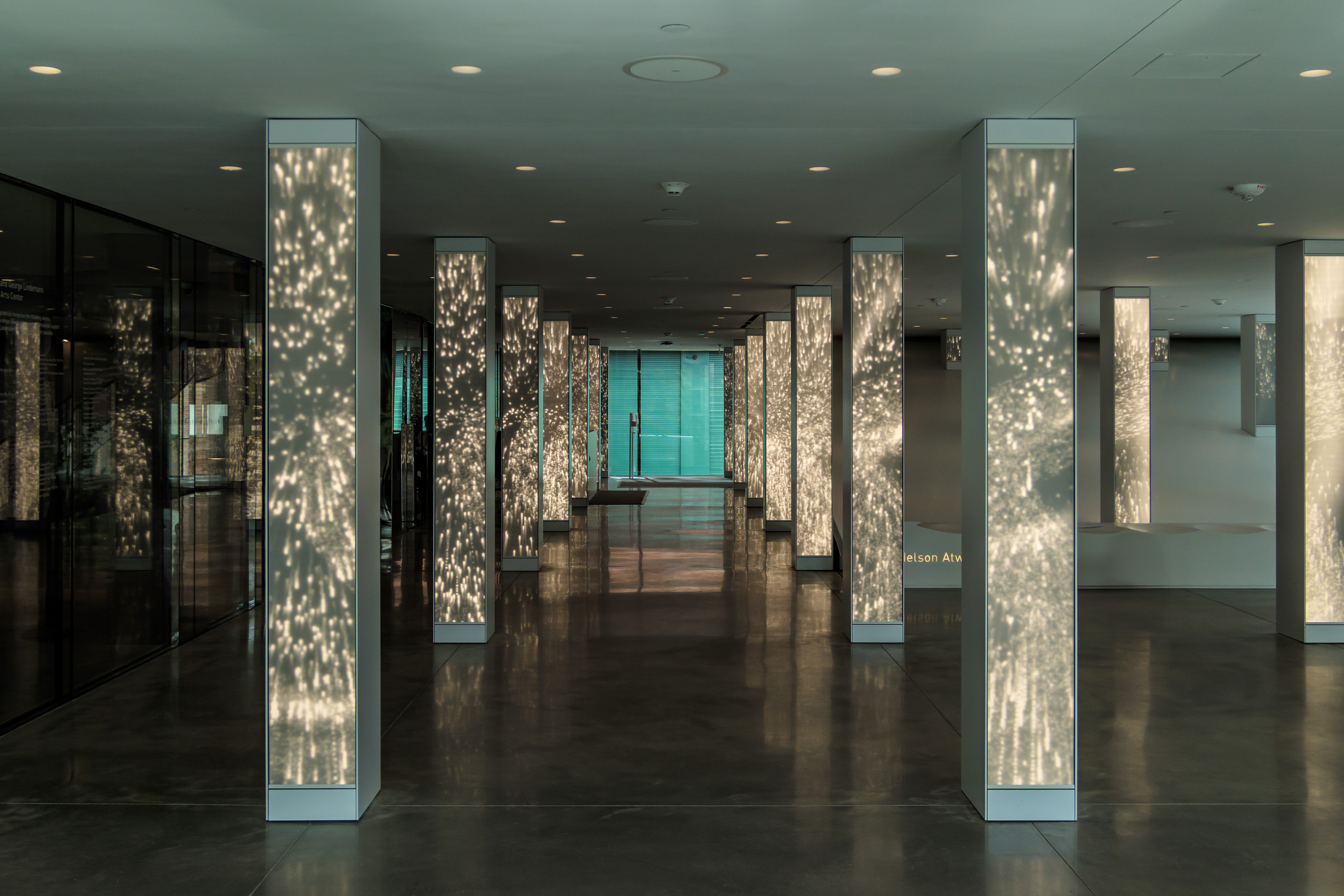
Infinite Composition, 2023, at the Lindemann Performing Arts Center
