= NetSuite =

American cloud based enterprise software company

NetSuite Inc.
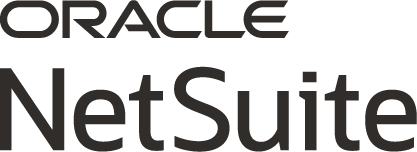
- Type: Subsidiary
- Traded as: NYSE: N
- Industry: Enterprise software Accounting software Cloud computing Enterprise resource planning (ERP)
- Founded: 1998; 28 years ago California, United States
- Founder: Evan Goldberg
- Headquarters: Austin, Texas, U.S.
- Key people: Evan Goldberg (EVP of Development); Larry Ellison (stakeholder)
- Products: ERP software Accounting software Inventory management software Financial software Order management system
- Services: Cloud-based business management platform Applications; Software as a Service
- Parent: Oracle Corporation
- Website: www.netsuite.com

NetSuite Inc. is an American cloud based enterprise software company. They provide products and services tailored towards small and medium-sized businesses (SMBs), including accounting, financial management, customer relationship management (CRM), inventory management, human capital management, payroll, procurement, project management, and e-commerce software. NetSuite was founded in 1998, and is currently headquartered in Austin, Texas. The company is seen as the first cloud computing software company, pre-dating Salesforce by roughly a month. Oracle acquired NetSuite for approximately $9.3 billion USD in November 2016. The Oracle NetSuite Global Business Unit is managed by Executive Vice President, Evan Goldberg.

== History ==
The company began in 1998, with a five minute phone call between Evan Goldberg and Larry Ellison where they discussed the idea of selling software over the internet, leading Evan Goldberg to found NetLedger. NetLedger offered web-hosted accounting software. The company was seeded with start-up money from Ellison who was Oracle's CEO, and it employed numerous staff previously employed at Oracle including the chairman, CTO, and other management who transitioned from Oracle to NetLedger. At one time, NetLedger was licensed to Oracle, branded as the Oracle Small Business Suite; however, that experience was short-lived, and the licensing deal was cancelled in 2004.

In July 2002, Zach Nelson was appointed CEO. In September 2003, the company officially changed its name from NetLedger to NetSuite, Inc. to reflect the company expanding its offerings to a suite of business applications beyond accounting.

On January 4, 2007, NetSuite named Oakland A's General Manager Billy Beane (of Moneyball fame) to its Board of Directors. NetSuite became a publicly traded company after its initial public offering (IPO) of 6.2 million shares on the New York Stock Exchange in December 2007. It traded under the single-letter ticker symbol "N". In 2010, NetSuite opened its first European software development centre in Brno, Czech Republic. By 2015, the centre employed more than 500 specialists.

On July 28, 2016, Oracle announced it had offered to purchase NetSuite for $9.3 billion. The deal closed in November. Up until the Oracle acquisition, Goldberg was the chief technology officer and chairman of the company.

NetSuite celebrated its 25th anniversary in 2023.

NetSuite headquarters are located in Austin, Texas. NetSuite has additional offices in Colorado, California, Illinois, New York, and abroad.

NetSuite Next is an update to Oracle NetSuite’s enterprise resource planning (ERP) platform that introduces embedded artificial intelligence and natural-language workflows to change how users interact with the system. The update also includes interface changes and AI-assisted features intended to enable task execution through conversational inputs and reduce reliance on traditional menu-based navigation.

In 2026, NetSuite expanded its partner program with the development of SuiteApp.AI Marketplace. The Marketplace is meant to assist partners with AI adoption by integrating with ERP workflows.

== Relationship with Oracle Corporation ==
In 1998, Evan Goldberg received approximately $125 million in initial financial backing from Larry Ellison, founder and CEO of Oracle through his venture capital entity Tako Ventures. Other initial investors were StarVest Partners, ADP, and UBS PaineWebber. The NetSuite software also relies on Oracle Database software.

Ellison and family members owned approximately 47.4% of NetSuite's common stock as of December 31, 2014. The firm's 10-Q filing on March 2, 2015, stated that "Mr. Ellison is able to exercise control over approval of significant corporate transactions, including a change of control or liquidation."

On July 28, 2016, Oracle announced it had offered to purchase NetSuite for $9.3 billion. The deal faced intense scrutiny because Oracle founder Larry Ellison owned nearly 40% of NetSuite. This conflict of interest led the board of both companies to establish independent committees to review the deal from the perspective of independent shareholders. Some major NetSuite shareholders, such as T. Rowe, notified Oracle they would not be tendering their shares under the current terms of the proposed deal. In early October 2016, Oracle extended the deadline for shareholders of NetSuite to tender their shares to November 4. The deal closed on November 7.

== Products, services and support ==
NetSuite offers a suite of cloud-based business management applications. The platform can support accounting capabilities like general ledger, accounts payable, accounts receivable, cash management, tax management, purchasing and inventory and order management, along with optional modules like customer relationship management, e-commerce, human resource and workforce management, payroll management, professional services automation, warehouse management and supply chain management. The cost of a NetSuite subscription is not fixed: it depends on the modules selected and the number of users. The platform is accessed via the cloud and all data is centralized and stored in the cloud, allowing users to access data from different devices and countries. Fixed asset management, revenue recognition, planning and budgeting, and subscription billing are also available. Multi-entity and global accounting and consolidation functionality is available at additional cost via NetSuite's OneWorld module, which supports 27 languages, and multiple currencies and tax codes. As with other cloud-based applications, periodic upgrades offer clients access to current features and functionality more readily than they would have been able to achieve using on-premises code.

NetSuite offers analytics and reporting, which use the centralized data to provide real-time visibility into client company operational and financial performance. Pre-configured role-based dashboards and key performance indicators allow users to monitor business performance. NetSuite Analytics Warehouse is a cloud-based analytics platform that consolidates NetSuite and external data for advanced reporting and analysis using Oracle Analytics Cloud and Oracle Autonomous Data Warehouse.

The SuiteCloud Platform is NetSuite's environment for extensibility and customization, enabling developers and partners to build and deploy applications and workflows throughout the system. It supports third-party integrations and partner-developed applications and was expanded to include tools for incorporating artificial intelligence and workflow automation.

In February 2026, NetSuite introduced the NetSuite Integration Platform, a low-code tool created to automate complex business processes.

The NetSuite AI Connector Service is an integration framework that allows external artificial intelligence systems, including large language models, to access and interact with NetSuite data and workflows. It uses the Model Context Protocol (MCP) to provide a standardized interface for data queries and actions within the system, subject to existing access controls.

== Acquisitions ==
- 2008: OpenAir – web-based timesheets and expense reports
- 2009: QuickArrow – web-based professional services automation application
- 2013: Retail Anywhere – retail e-commerce software
- 2013: TribeHR – human resource software for small to medium-sized businesses
- 2013: Order Motion – cloud-based direct-to-consumer order management system
- 2013: LightCMS – content management software
- 2014: Venda – retail e-commerce software
- 2014: eBizNET solutions – advanced warehouse management
- 2015: Bronto Software – email service provider
- 2015: Monexa – subscription billing and recurring payment
- 2021: FarApp – provides e-commerce, logistics, retail, and hospitality connectors for Oracle NetSuite
- 2022: Verenia CPQ – allows customers to generate sales proposals directly from NetSuite ERP
- 2022: ADI Insights – overtime management, time capture, demand forecasting, and shift scheduling
- 2023: Next Technik – Field Service Management

== See also ==
- Accounting software
- Applicant tracking system
- Comparison of accounting software
- Customer relationship management
- Comparison of CRM systems
- List of embedded CRM systems
- Comparison of PSA systems
- E-commerce
- Enterprise resource planning
- Human resource management system
- Professional services automation
