= Bronte, New Zealand =

Bronte
- Locality
- Interactive map of Bronte
- Coordinates: 41°16′05″S 173°04′55″E
- Country: New Zealand
- Territorial authority: Tasman
- Ward: Moutere-Waimea Ward
- Electorates: West Coast-Tasman; Te Tai Tonga (Māori)

Government
  - Territorial Authority: Tasman District Council
  - Mayor of Tasman: Tim King
  - West Coast-Tasman MP: Maureen Pugh
  - Te Tai Tonga MP: Tākuta Ferris

Area
  - Total: 1.21 km^{2} (0.47 sq mi)

Population (2023 census)
  - Total: 141
  - Density: 117/km^{2} (302/sq mi)

Bronte, a locality in the Tasman District of New Zealand, lies between Richmond and Māpua.

Admiral Horatio Nelson (1758-1805), the eponym of the Nelson Region, became Duke of Bronte (in Sicily) in 1799. (The Bronte area in New Zealand formed part of the former Nelson Province from 1853 to 1876, and subsequently part of the Nelson Provincial District prior to the formation of the Tasman District in 1992.)

== Demographics ==
Bronte locality covers 1.21 km^{2} (0.47 sq mi). It is part of the larger Waimea Inlet statistical area.

Historical population for Bronte locality
Year	Pop.	±% p.a.
2006	102	—
2013	75	−4.30%
2018	114	+8.73%
2023	141	+4.34%

Bronte had a population of 141 in the 2023 New Zealand census, an increase of 27 people (23.7%) since the 2018 census, and an increase of 66 people (88.0%) since the 2013 census. There were 66 males and 75 females in 57 dwellings. 2.1% of people identified as LGBTIQ+. The median age was 54.4 years (compared with 38.1 years nationally). There were 18 people (12.8%) aged under 15 years, 18 (12.8%) aged 15 to 29, 66 (46.8%) aged 30 to 64, and 39 (27.7%) aged 65 or older.

People could identify as more than one ethnicity. The results were 87.2% European (Pākehā), 8.5% Māori, 10.6% Asian, and 4.3% other, which includes people giving their ethnicity as "New Zealander". English was spoken by 95.7%, Māori by 2.1%, and other languages by 14.9%. No language could be spoken by 2.1% (e.g. too young to talk). The percentage of people born overseas was 38.3, compared with 28.8% nationally.

Religious affiliations were 29.8% Christian, 2.1% New Age, and 2.1% other religions. People who answered that they had no religion were 59.6%, and 8.5% of people did not answer the census question.

Of those at least 15 years old, 45 (36.6%) people had a bachelor's or higher degree, 57 (46.3%) had a post-high school certificate or diploma, and 24 (19.5%) people exclusively held high school qualifications. The median income was $47,000, compared with $41,500 nationally. 21 people (17.1%) earned over $100,000 compared to 12.1% nationally. The employment status of those at least 15 was 60 (48.8%) full-time, 18 (14.6%) part-time, and 3 (2.4%) unemployed.

=== Waimea Inlet statistical area ===
Waimea Inlet statistical area covers the southwestern coast of Waimea Inlet, and has an area of 6.53 km^{2} (2.52 sq mi). It had an estimated population of 1,000 as of June 2025, with a population density of 153 people per km^{2}.

Historical population for the statistical area
Year	Pop.	±% p.a.
2006	405	—
2013	564	+4.84%
2018	765	+6.29%
2023	999	+5.48%
The 2006 population is for an area of 6.54 km^{2} with different boundaries on the south and east. Source:

Waimea Inlet had a population of 999 in the 2023 New Zealand census, an increase of 234 people (30.6%) since the 2018 census, and an increase of 435 people (77.1%) since the 2013 census. There were 483 males, 513 females, and 3 people of other genders in 381 dwellings. 2.7% of people identified as LGBTIQ+. The median age was 53.6 years (compared with 38.1 years nationally). There were 135 people (13.5%) aged under 15 years, 108 (10.8%) aged 15 to 29, 492 (49.2%) aged 30 to 64, and 264 (26.4%) aged 65 or older.

People could identify as more than one ethnicity. The results were 94.6% European (Pākehā), 7.5% Māori, 0.3% Pasifika, 3.6% Asian, and 2.7% other, which includes people giving their ethnicity as "New Zealander". English was spoken by 98.5%, Māori by 1.2%, and other languages by 9.6%. No language could be spoken by 1.2% (e.g. too young to talk). New Zealand Sign Language was known by 0.3%. The percentage of people born overseas was 25.5, compared with 28.8% nationally.

Religious affiliations were 27.6% Christian, 0.6% Hindu, 0.9% Buddhist, 0.6% New Age, 0.3% Jewish, and 0.6% other religions. People who answered that they had no religion were 61.0%, and 8.7% of people did not answer the census question.

Of those at least 15 years old, 309 (35.8%) people had a bachelor's or higher degree, 429 (49.7%) had a post-high school certificate or diploma, and 129 (14.9%) people exclusively held high school qualifications. The median income was $45,500, compared with $41,500 nationally. 135 people (15.6%) earned over $100,000 compared to 12.1% nationally. The employment status of those at least 15 was 396 (45.8%) full-time, 147 (17.0%) part-time, and 21 (2.4%) unemployed.
