= Astrape and Bronte =

Greek personifications of lightning and thunder

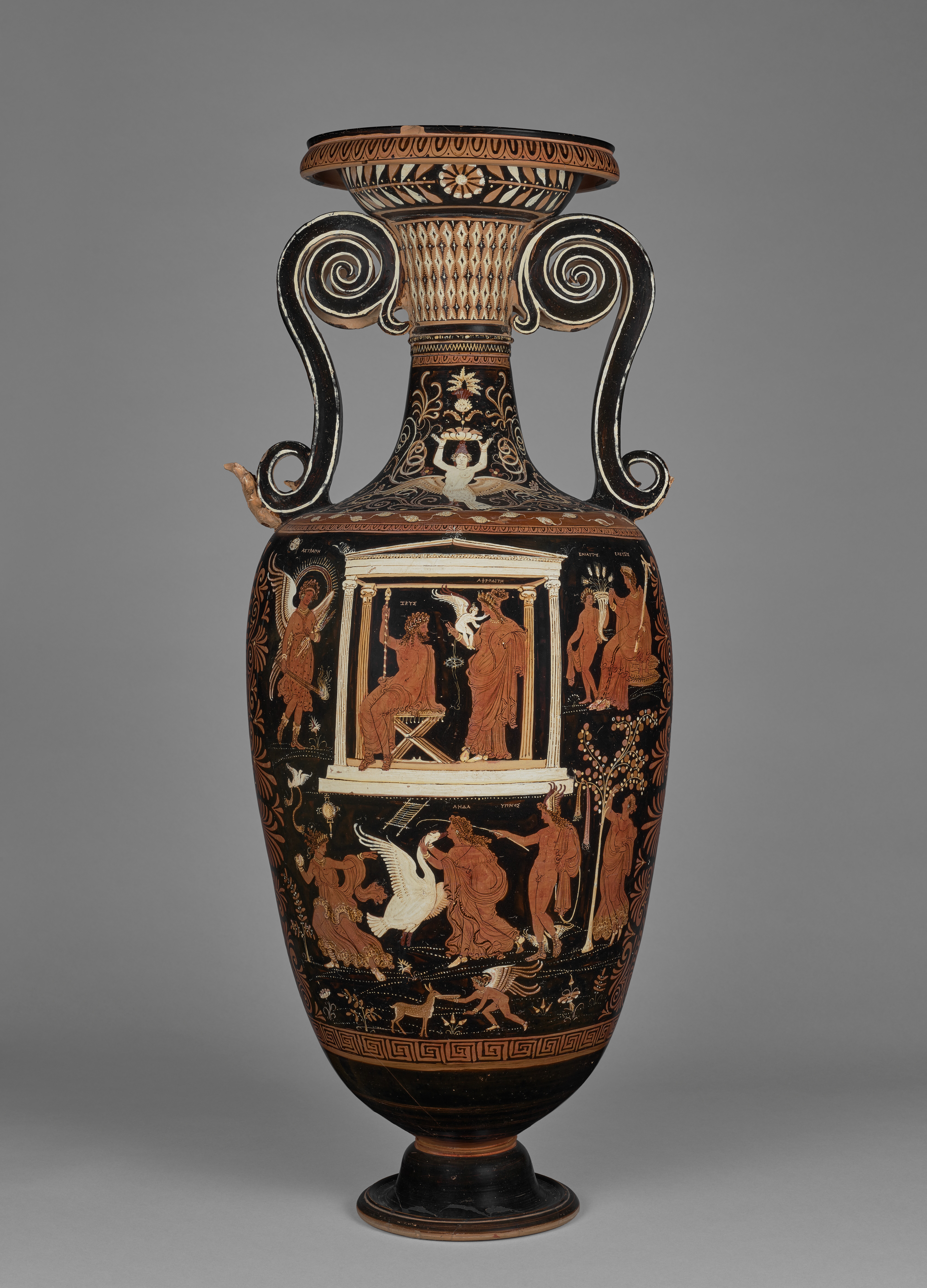
Astrape next to the left of Zeus on an Apulian red-figure loutrophoros, 330 BC.

In Greek mythology, Astrape (Ancient Greek: Ἀστραπή, lit. 'lightning, gleam, flash') and Bronte (Ancient Greek: Βροντή, lit. 'thunder') are personifications of lightning and thunder, respectively.

== Iconographic representations ==
On an Apulian loutrophoros dating to around 330 BC, Astrape stands beside the throne of Zeus bearing the armaments of the sky-god. She also wields a torch and is a crowned with a shining aureole. According to Pliny the Elder, Astrape and Bronte were among the figures depicted by the 4th-century BCE painter Apelles.

The 3rd-century BCE writer Philostratus the Elder, in his Imagines, mentions that the two figures are featured in a painting of the death of Semele:

Brontè stern of face, and Astrapè flashing light from her eyes, and raging fire from heaven that has laid hold of a king’s house, suggest the following tale, if it is one you know. A cloud of fire encompassing Thebes breaks into the dwelling of Cadmus as Zeus comes wooing Semele; and Semele apparently is destroyed, but Dionysus is born, by Zeus, so I believe, in the presence of the fire.

== Literary references ==
Bronte is mentioned (as Βρονταί, "Thunder") among the figures listed in the proem of the Orphic Hymns, a 2nd- or 3nd-century AD collection of hymns originating from Asia Minor; in spite of this, the collection contains hymns to "Zeus the Thunderbolt" (Zeus Keraunos) and "Zeus of the Lightning" (Zeus Astrapeus) but not "Zeus of the Thunder", with both Thunderbolt and Lightning going unmentioned in the proem. Astrape is also, in a scholium on Euripides, the name of one of the horses of Helios.
