= Brushford, Somerset =

Village and civil parish in England

Coordinates: 51.0188°N 3.5340°W

Brushford
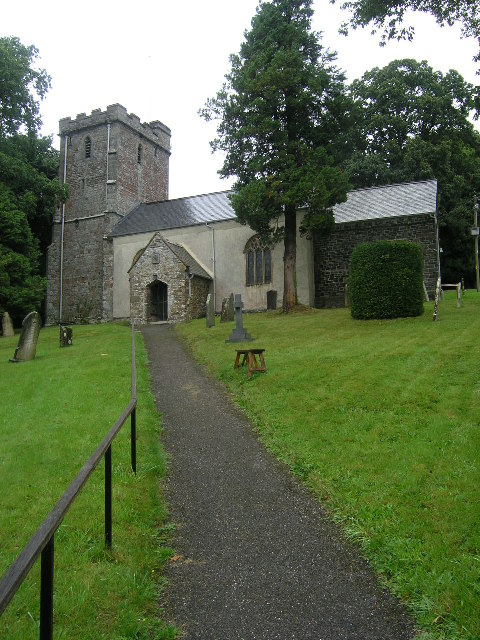
- Church of St Nicholas, Brushford

- Location within Somerset
- Population: 519 (2011)
- OS grid reference: SS925255
- Unitary authority: Somerset Council
- Ceremonial county: Somerset
- Region: South West
- Country: England
- Sovereign state: United Kingdom
- Post town: DULVERTON
- Postcode district: TA22
- Dialling code: 01398
- Police: Avon and Somerset
- Fire: Devon and Somerset
- Ambulance: South Western
- UK Parliament: Tiverton and Minehead

Brushford is a village and civil parish 2 miles (3.2 km) south of Dulverton and 12 miles (19 km) north of Tiverton in Devon, in Somerset, England. According to the 2001 census, it had a population of 535 in 243 households, reducing to 519 at the 2011 Census. It covers an area of 1,149 hectares (11 km^{2}) of which 3 hectares (0.030 km^{2}) is within the Exmoor National Park.

The River Exe which forms the boundary of the parish and the border between Somerset and Devon is crossed by the 18th-century Exe Bridge. The River Barle is crossed by the New Bridge dating from 1870, which led to Pixton Park, and the Weir Bridge which dates from the mid 19th century. West Somerset Polo Club used to play in fields below the village alongside the River Barle. The fields in the area are now mainly grazed by stock.

The village consists of a local garage, some housing areas, a playground with a basketball court, a village hall and a church. Its population increased at four times the rate of the UK percentage growth rate, over the years 1994 to 2004 and a need for more affordable housing was identified in 2006.

== History ==
The village was known as Brucheford or Brigeford in the Domesday Book of 1086 when it was held by Robert, Count of Mortain, and Briggeford in 1270.

In Saxon times, it was a tributary manor of Dulverton, held by Ordwulf on behalf of King Edward II and paid a tax of 24 sheep. The parish of Brushford was part of the Williton and Freemanners Hundred.

It was also home to the Dulverton railway station. The station was the largest intermediate station on the Devon and Somerset Railway, which ran from Taunton to Barnstaple. The station served the town of Dulverton and from 1884 acted also as the junction station for the Exe Valley Railway. Exe Valley services ceased with the closure of the line on 7 October 1963. Goods services were withdrawn at Dulverton the following year and complete closure of the Devon and Somerset line came on 3 October 1966. The station buildings survived as part of the Caernarvon Arms Hotel, which was visited by the poet Tennyson in 1891, and has since been re-developed into flats.

== Governance ==
The parish council has responsibility for local issues, including setting an annual precept (local rate) to cover the council's operating costs and producing annual accounts for public scrutiny. The parish council evaluates local planning applications and works with the local police, district council officers, and neighbourhood watch groups on matters of crime, security, and traffic. The parish council's role also includes initiating projects for the maintenance and repair of parish facilities, as well as consulting with the district council on the maintenance, repair, and improvement of highways, drainage, footpaths, public transport, and street cleaning. Conservation matters (including trees and listed buildings) and environmental issues are also the responsibility of the council.

For local government purposes, since 1 April 2023, the parish comes under the unitary authority of Somerset Council. Prior to this, it was part of the non-metropolitan district of Somerset West and Taunton (formed on 1 April 2019) and, before this, the district of West Somerset (established under the Local Government Act 1972). It was part of Dulverton Rural District before 1974.

It is also part of the Tiverton and Minehead county constituency represented in the House of Commons of the Parliament of the United Kingdom. It elects one Member of Parliament (MP) by the first past the post system of election. It was part of the South West England constituency of the European Parliament prior to Britain leaving the European Union in January 2020, which elected seven MEPs using the d'Hondt method of party-list proportional representation.

== Religious sites ==
The Anglican parish Church of St Nicholas was built in the 15th century, but has undergone a range of rebuilding and development since. It has been designated as a Grade I listed building. The Herbert memorial chapel, designed by Sir Edwin Lutyens, includes a chest tomb with effigy of Aubrey Herbert of Pixton Park, the Conservative Member of Parliament (MP) for the Southern division of Somerset from 1911 to 1918, and for Yeovil from 1918 until his death in 1923, by Cecil de Banquiere Howard of Paris under a wooden canopy also designed by Lutyens. The church has a medieval screen, 13th-century font and possibly the oldest parish chest in the country, hollowed from a tree trunk.
