= South Somerset District Council elections =

Local government elections in Somerset, England

South Somerset District Council in Somerset, England was elected every four years. Since 2019 the council is divided into 34 wards electing 60 councillors. The council was abolished on 1 April 2023, when it was replaced by Somerset Council, a unitary authority.

== Political control ==
Since the first election to the council in 1973 political control of the council has been held by the following parties:

Party in control	Years
No overall control	1973–1976
Conservative	1976–1979
No overall control	1979–1987
Liberal Democrats	1987–2023

=== Leadership ===
The leaders of the council from 2006 until its abolition in 2023 were:

Councillor	Party	From	To
Tim Carroll	Liberal Democrats	2006	May 2011
Ric Pallister	Liberal Democrats	19 May 2011	31 Aug 2018
Val Keitch	Liberal Democrats	1 Sep 2018	31 Mar 2023

== Council elections ==
- 1973 Yeovil District Council election
- 1976 Yeovil District Council election (New ward boundaries)
- 1979 Yeovil District Council election
- 1983 Yeovil District Council election
- 1987 South Somerset District Council election
- 1991 South Somerset District Council election (New ward boundaries & district boundary changes also took place)
- 1995 South Somerset District Council election
- 1999 South Somerset District Council election (New ward boundaries)
- 2003 South Somerset District Council election
- 2007 South Somerset District Council election
- 2011 South Somerset District Council election
- 2015 South Somerset District Council election
- 2019 South Somerset District Council election (New ward boundaries)

== District result maps ==
1999 results map

2003 results map

2007 results map

2011 results map

2015 results map

2019 results map

== By-election results ==
=== 1995-1999 ===
Crewkerne By-Election 27 November 1997
Party	Candidate	Votes	%	±%
Conservative		455	38.9	+11.7
Liberal Democrats		421	36.0	−7.1
Labour		294	25.1	−4.6
Majority		34	2.9	
Turnout		1,170	19.0	
Conservative gain from Liberal Democrats		Swing		

=== 1999-2003 ===
Chard Avishayes By-Election 14 September 2000
Party	Candidate	Votes	%	±%
Liberal Democrats		571	70.9	+27.6
Conservative		234	29.1	−11.7
Majority		337	41.8	
Turnout		805	44.6	
Liberal Democrats hold		Swing		

Camelot By-Election 21 March 2002
Party	Candidate	Votes	%	±%
Conservative		618	57.5	−14.1
Liberal Democrats		457	42.5	+14.1
Majority		161	15.0	
Turnout		1,075	52.3	
Conservative hold		Swing		

=== 2003-2007 ===
Crewkerne By-Election 2 June 2005
Party	Candidate	Votes	%	±%
Liberal Democrats		859	57.8	+10.7
Conservative		627	42.2	+6.6
Majority		232	15.6	
Turnout		1,486	25.3	
Liberal Democrats gain from Conservative		Swing		

Brympton By-Election 27 October 2005
Party	Candidate	Votes	%	±%
Liberal Democrats	Peter Seib	478	58.0	+1.8
Conservative	Philippa Hamilton	232	28.2	−8.4
Independent	Elizabeth Glaisher	113	13.7	+13.7
Majority		246	29.8	
Turnout		823	18.3	
Liberal Democrats hold		Swing		

Chard Holyrood By-Election 14 September 2006
Party	Candidate	Votes	%	±%
Liberal Democrats	Daniel Shortland	367	54.5	+37.0
Conservative	Stephen Wright	180	26.7	+26.7
Independent	Rita Wickenden	127	18.8	−63.7
Majority		187	27.8	
Turnout		674	30.2	
Liberal Democrats gain from Independent		Swing		

=== 2007-2011 ===
Chard Crimchard By-Election 29 May 2008
Party	Candidate	Votes	%	±%
Liberal Democrats	Jenny Kenton	423	47.2	−5.0
Conservative	David Mears	320	35.7	−0.7
BNP	Robert Baehr	154	17.2	+17.2
Majority		103	11.5	
Turnout		897	44.5	
Liberal Democrats hold		Swing		

Coker By-Election 4 June 2009
Party	Candidate	Votes	%	±%
Liberal Democrats	Cathy Bakewell	1,010	47.2	+0.1
Conservative	Gina Seaton	1,002	46.9	+5.5
Independent	Nick Hester	126	5.9	+5.9
Majority		8	0.3	
Turnout		2,138		
Liberal Democrats hold		Swing		

Ilminster By-Election 4 June 2009
Party	Candidate	Votes	%	±%
Liberal Democrats	Carol Goodall	1,192	58.0	+10.1
Conservative	Jane Morgan	862	42.0	+7.3
Majority		330	16.0	
Turnout		2,054		
Liberal Democrats hold		Swing		
