= Church of St Nicholas, Brushford =

Church in Somerset, England

Church of St Nicholas
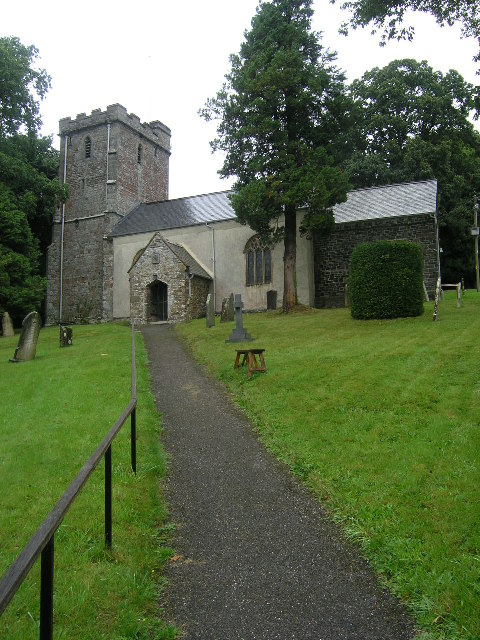

- Location within Somerset

General information
- Location: Brushford, England
- Coordinates: 51.0208°N 3.5419°W
- Completed: 15th century

The Anglican parish Church of St Nicholas in Brushford, Somerset, England was built in the 15th century, and has been designated as a Grade I listed building.

The church has a medieval screen, 13th-century font and possibly the oldest parish chest in the country, hollowed from a tree trunk.

The roof was at one time covered with pegged oak planks. Some of these were discovered during repairs in 2001 and 2002 and suggest that it once had roof shingles.

The Herbert memorial chapel includes a chest tomb with effigy of Aubrey Herbert of Pixton Park, the Conservative Member of Parliament (MP) for the Southern division of Somerset from 1911 to 1918, and for Yeovil from 1918 until his death in 1923, by Cecil de Banquiere Howard of Paris under a wooden canopy designed by Edwin Lutyens.

The parish is within the benefice of Dulverton with Brushford, Brompton Regis, Upton and Skilgate which is part of the Exmoor deanery.

== See also ==
- Grade I listed buildings in West Somerset
- List of Somerset towers
