= 2011 South Somerset District Council election =

2011 UK local government election

The 2011 South Somerset District Council election was held on Thursday 5 May 2011 to elect all 60 members of South Somerset District Council to a four-year term, the same day as other local elections in the United Kingdom. It was preceded by the 2007 election and followed by the 2015 election. The Liberal Democrats held control of the council. The turnout across the council was 49.7%.

== Results summary ==
2011 South Somerset District Council election
Party	Seats	Net gain/loss	Seats %	Votes %	Votes	+/−
Liberal Democrats	31	▼7	51.7			
Conservative	25	▲8	41.7			
Independent	4	▼1	6.7			
Green	0	Steady	0.0			
Labour	0	Steady	0.0			
UKIP	0	Steady	0.0			

== Ward results ==
=== Blackdown ===
Blackdown (1 seat)
Party	Candidate	Votes	%	±%
Conservative	Ros Rodergio*	717	70.0	▲2.1
Liberal Democrats	Emily Weeks	308	30.0	▼2.1
Majority		409	39.9	▲4.1
Total valid votes		1,025	51.7	
Turnout			53.6	
Registered electors		1,984		
Conservative hold		Swing	▲2.1	

=== Blackmoor Vale ===
Blackmoor Vale (2 seats)
Party	Candidate	Votes	%	±%
Conservative	William Wallace*	1,421		
Conservative	Tim Inglefield*	1,305		
Independent	David Nichols	605		
Liberal Democrats	Richard Crabb	531		
Labour	Jo Penberthy	271		
Turnout			53.4	
Registered electors		4,580		
Conservative hold				
Conservative hold				

=== Bruton ===
Bruton (1 seat)
Party	Candidate	Votes	%	±%
Conservative	Anna Groskop*	654	57.6	▼16.5
Independent	Justin Robinson	318	28.0	New
Labour	Matthew Hooberman	163	14.4	New
Majority		336	29.6	▼18.6
Total valid votes		1,135	58.7	
Registered electors		1,933		
Conservative hold		Swing	▼22.2	

=== Brympton ===
Brympton (2 seats)
Party	Candidate	Votes	%	±%
Liberal Democrats	Peter Seib*	1,123		
Liberal Democrats	John Richardson*	925		
Conservative	Graham Pritchard	792		
Conservative	Veronica Venables	702		
Turnout			37.6	
Registered electors		5,468		
Liberal Democrats hold				
Liberal Democrats hold				

=== Burrow Hill ===
Burrow Hill (1 seat)
Party	Candidate	Votes	%	±%
Conservative	Derek Yeomans*	686	66.7	▲1.2
Liberal Democrats	Ray Warner	342	33.3	▼1.2
Majority		344	33.5	▲2.3
Total valid votes		1,028	55.3	
Turnout			56.7	
Registered electors		1,860		
Conservative hold		Swing	▲1.2	

=== Camelot ===
Camelot (1 seat)
Party	Candidate	Votes	%	±%
Conservative	Mike Lewis*	953	71.3	▲1.4
Liberal Democrats	Samuel Crabb	383	28.7	▼1.4
Majority		570	42.7	▲2.9
Total valid votes		1,336	62.5	
Turnout			63.6	
Registered electors		2,139		
Conservative hold		Swing	▲1.4	

=== Cary ===
Cary (2 seats)
Party	Candidate	Votes	%	±%
Liberal Democrats	Henry Hobhouse*	1,448		
Conservative	Nick Weeks	1,179		
Conservative	Janette Cronie	1,068		
Liberal Democrats	Marilyn Upton	961		
Turnout			57.1	
Registered electors		4,535		
Liberal Democrats hold				
Conservative hold				

=== Chard Avishayes ===
Chard Avishayes (1 seat)
Party	Candidate	Votes	%	±%
Liberal Democrats	Nigel Mermagen*	376	46.1	▼13.2
Conservative	Peter Amey	242	29.7	▲7.5
UKIP	Audrey Spencer	198	24.3	▲5.7
Majority		134	16.4	▼20.8
Total valid votes		816	39.1	
Turnout			39.8	
Registered electors		2,088		
Liberal Democrats hold		Swing	▼10.4	

=== Chard Combe ===
Chard Combe (1 seat)
Party	Candidate	Votes	%	±%
Conservative	Martin Wale*	443	55.0	▲15.1
Liberal Democrats	Sara Dowell	363	45.0	▲10.7
Majority		80	9.9	▲4.4
Total valid votes		806	43.5	
Turnout			45.0	
Registered electors		1,855		
Conservative hold		Swing	▲2.2	

=== Chard Crimchard ===
Chard Crimchard (1 seat)
Party	Candidate	Votes	%	±%
Liberal Democrats	Jenny Kenton	367	41.1	▼11.1
Independent	Tony Prior	324	36.3	New
Conservative	Derek Bassett	160	17.9	▼18.4
UKIP	Clive Small	41	4.6	New
Majority		43	4.8	▼11.0
Total valid votes		892	44.6	
Rejected ballots				
Turnout			45.8	
Registered electors		1,998		
Liberal Democrats hold		Swing	▼23.7	

=== Chard Holyrood ===
Chard Holyrood (1 seat)
Party	Candidate	Votes	%	±%
Conservative	Brennie Halse	464	51.3	▲12.5
Liberal Democrats	Garry Shortland	440	48.7	▼12.5
Majority		24	2.7	N/A
Total valid votes		904	37.1	
Turnout			38.2	
Registered electors		2,438		
Conservative gain from Liberal Democrats		Swing	▲12.5	

=== Chard Jocelyn ===
Chard Jocelyn (1 seat)
Party	Candidate	Votes	%	±%
Independent	Dave Bulmer*	696	82.6	▲22.3
Liberal Democrats	Abdul Bostan	147	17.4	▼9.3
Majority		549	65.1	▲31.6
Total valid votes		843	41.2	
Turnout			41.8	
Registered electors		2,047		
Independent hold		Swing	▲15.8	

=== Coker ===
Coker (2 seats)
Party	Candidate	Votes	%	±%
Conservative	Gina Seaton	1,153		
Liberal Democrats	Cathy Bakewell	1,047		
Liberal Democrats	Lesley Boucher*	1,022		
Conservative	Fred Monson	988		
Green	Peter Bysouth	359		
Turnout			56.2	
Registered electors		4,465		
Conservative gain from Liberal Democrats				
Liberal Democrats hold				

=== Crewkerne ===
Crewkerne (3 seats)
Party	Candidate	Votes	%	±%
Liberal Democrats	Michael Best*	1,653		
Liberal Democrats	John Dyke	1,624		
Liberal Democrats	Angie Singleton*	1,446		
Conservative	Marcus Barrett	1,097		
Conservative	Teresa Bond	978		
Conservative	Peter Traves	833		
Green	Ben Hartshorn	543		
UKIP	Arthur Hamlin	529		
UKIP	Nigel Pearson	418		
Turnout			53.4	
Registered electors		6,325		
Liberal Democrats hold				
Liberal Democrats hold				
Liberal Democrats hold				

=== Curry Rivel ===
Curry Rivel (1 seat)
Party	Candidate	Votes	%	±%
Independent	Terry Mounter	629	53.7	New
Conservative	Maurice Powell	543	46.3	▼16.6
Majority		86	7.3	N/A
Total valid votes		1,172	54.9	
Turnout			55.6	
Registered electors		2,134		
Independent gain from Conservative		Swing	▲35.1	

=== Eggwood ===
Eggwood (1 seat)
Party	Candidate	Votes	%	±%
Liberal Democrats	Paul Maxwell	613	60.5	▲1.0
Conservative	Nick Clarke	401	39.5	▼1.0
Majority		212	20.9	▲1.9
Total valid votes		1,014	50.0	
Turnout			51.5	
Registered electors		2,027		
Liberal Democrats hold		Swing	▲1.0	

=== Hamdon ===
Hamdon (1 seat)
Party	Candidate	Votes	%	±%
Liberal Democrats	Sylvia Seal*	645	56.3	▼6.2
Conservative	Ashley Gray	341	29.8	▲3.3
Green	Alexander Lawrie	160	14.0	New
Majority		304	26.5	▼9.5
Total valid votes		1,146	53.2	
Turnout			53.8	
Registered electors		2,154		
Liberal Democrats hold		Swing	▼4.7	

=== Ilminster ===
Ilminster (2 seats)
Party	Candidate	Votes	%	±%
Liberal Democrats	Carol Goodall	1,055		
Liberal Democrats	Kim Turner*	992		
Conservative	Veronica Horman	635		
Conservative	Adam Kennedy	581		
Green	Neil Galbraith	332		
Labour	Paul Sellers	243		
UKIP	Gethyn Jenkins	241		
Turnout			47.5	
Registered electors		4,720		
Liberal Democrats hold				
Liberal Democrats hold				

=== Islemoor ===
Islemoor (1 seat)
Party	Candidate	Votes	%	±%
Conservative	Sue Steele*	833	69.0	▲5.9
Liberal Democrats	Peter Wescott	375	31.0	▼5.9
Majority		458	37.9	▲11.8
Total valid votes		1,208	53.4	
Turnout			55.2	
Registered electors		2,261		
Conservative hold		Swing	▲5.9	

=== Ivelchester ===
Ivelchester (1 seat)
Party	Candidate	Votes	%	±%
Independent	Tony Capozzoli*	780	75.0	▼25.0
Liberal Democrats	Leah Cross	260	25.0	New
Majority		520	50.0	N/A
Total valid votes		1,040	40.7	
Turnout			41.2	
Registered electors		2,557		
Independent hold		Swing	▼25.0	

=== Langport and Huish ===
Langport and Huish (1 seat)
Party	Candidate	Votes	%	±%
Liberal Democrats	Roy Mills*	444	41.3	▼17.5
Conservative	Tony Packham	343	31.9	▼9.3
Green	Cara Naden	289	26.9	New
Majority		101	9.4	▼8.2
Total valid votes		1,076	46.7	
Turnout			47.4	
Registered electors		2,304		
Liberal Democrats hold		Swing	▼4.1	

=== Martock ===
Martock (2 seats)
Party	Candidate	Votes	%	±%
Conservative	Graham Middleton	824		
Independent	Patrick Palmer*	805		
Conservative	David Stoodley	733		
Liberal Democrats	John Bailey	703		
Labour	Chris Bragg	381		
Independent	Jenny Hulme-Atthis	251		
Turnout			48.7	
Registered electors		4,637		
Conservative gain from Liberal Democrats				
Independent hold				

=== Milborne Port ===
Milborne Port (1 seat)
Party	Candidate	Votes	%	±%
Conservative	Lucinda Wallace*	532	47.9	▼2.8
Liberal Democrats	Susan Place	383	34.5	▼14.9
Labour	David Lowe	196	17.6	New
Majority		149	13.4	▲12.1
Total valid votes		1,111	49.4	
Turnout			49.7	
Registered electors		2,251		
Conservative hold		Swing	▲6.0	

=== Neroche ===
Neroche (1 seat)
Party	Candidate	Votes	%	±%
Conservative	Linda Vijeh*	594	49.9	▼2.7
Liberal Democrats	Ray Buckler	406	34.1	▼8.1
UKIP	Clive Rust	190	16.0	New
Majority		188	15.8	▲5.3
Total valid votes		1,190	58.5	
Turnout			59.2	
Registered electors		2,033		
Conservative hold		Swing	▲2.7	

=== Northstone ===
Northstone (1 seat)
Party	Candidate	Votes	%	±%
Conservative	Rex Calvert*	785	60.4	▲6.1
Liberal Democrats	David Nye	316	24.3	▼21.4
Green	David Taylor	199	15.3	New
Majority		469	36.1	▲27.5
Total valid votes		1,300	53.3	
Turnout			53.8	
Registered electors		2,439		
Conservative hold		Swing	▲13.7	

=== Parrett ===
Parrett (1 seat)
Party	Candidate	Votes	%	±%
Liberal Democrats	Richard Pallister*	623	53.8	▲1.8
Conservative	Dale Egerton	535	46.2	▼1.8
Majority		88	7.6	▲3.6
Total valid votes		1,158	58.4	
Turnout			59.9	
Registered electors		1,983		
Liberal Democrats hold		Swing	▲1.8	

=== St. Michael's ===
St. Michael's (1 seat)
Party	Candidate	Votes	%	±%
Liberal Democrats	Jo Roundell Greene*	534	57.9	▼3.1
Conservative	Christopher le Hardy	389	42.1	▲3.1
Majority		145	15.71	▼6.2
Total valid votes		923	50.3	
Turnout			51.8	
Registered electors		1,836		
Liberal Democrats hold		Swing	▼6.2	

=== South Petherton ===
South Petherton (2 seats)
Party	Candidate	Votes	%	±%
Conservative	Paul Thompson	985		
Conservative	Barry Walker	945		
Liberal Democrats	Jo Dawson	827		
Liberal Democrats	Simon Bending	783		
Green	Charlotte Revely	393		
Turnout			54.0	
Registered electors		4,028		
Conservative hold				
Conservative gain from Liberal Democrats				

=== Tatworth and Forton ===
Tatworth and Forton (1 seat)
Party	Candidate	Votes	%	±%
Liberal Democrats	Andrew Turpin*	508	47.1	▼6.9
Conservative	Russ Wardell	431	40.0	▲14.6
Green	Peter Rosser	139	12.9	New
Majority		77	7.1	▼21.5
Total valid votes		1,078	48.8	
Turnout			49.3	
Registered electors		2,210		
Liberal Democrats hold		Swing	▼10.8	

=== Tower ===
Tower (1 seat)
Party	Candidate	Votes	%	±%
Conservative	Mike Beech	755	65.1	▼9.9
Liberal Democrats	Gordon Czapiewski	274	23.6	▼1.4
Labour	Adrian Carter	130	11.2	New
Majority		481	41.5	▼8.5
Total valid votes		1,159	58.1	
Turnout			58.8	
Registered electors		1,994		
Conservative hold		Swing	▼4.2	

=== Turn Hill ===
Turn Hill (1 seat)
Party	Candidate	Votes	%	±%
Conservative	Shane Pledger	744	59.0	New
Liberal Democrats	Julia Gadd	516	41.0	New
Majority		228	18.1	N/A
Total valid votes		1,260	55.7	
Turnout			57.2	
Registered electors		2,262		
Conservative gain from Independent		Swing		

=== Wessex ===
Wessex (2 seats)
Party	Candidate	Votes	%	±%
Liberal Democrats	Pauline Clarke	1,163		
Conservative	David Norris	791		
Green	Margaret Chambers	717		
Liberal Democrats	David Harrison	627		
Turnout			51.0	
Registered electors		4,375		
Liberal Democrats gain from Independent				
Conservative hold				

=== Wincanton ===
Wincanton (2 seats)
Party	Candidate	Votes	%	±%
Conservative	Nick Colbert	981		
Conservative	Colin Winder*	963		
Liberal Democrats	Jane Lock	566		
Green	David Carnegie	283		
Labour	Tim Daniel	262		
Turnout			43.9	
Registered electors		4,132		
Conservative gain from Liberal Democrats				
Conservative hold				

=== Windwhistle ===
Windwhistle (1 seat)
Party	Candidate	Votes	%	±%
Conservative	Sue Osborne	599	53.9	▲5.4
Liberal Democrats	Robin Munday*	280	25.2	▼26.3
Green	Peter Lansdown	232	20.9	New
Majority		319	28.7	N/A
Total valid votes		1,111	57.1	
Turnout			57.8	
Registered electors		1,947		
Conservative gain from Liberal Democrats		Swing	▲15.9	

=== Yeovil Central ===
Yeovil Central (3 seats)
Party	Candidate	Votes	%	±%
Liberal Democrats	John Chainey*	854		
Liberal Democrats	Peter Gubbins*	778		
Liberal Democrats	Andy Kendall*	739		
Conservative	David Byrne	485		
Conservative	Kim Vickers	477		
Conservative	Bridget Spender	458		
Labour	Terry Lavin	363		
Labour	Fred Wood	312		
UKIP	Evelyn Boxall	227		
Independent	Tom Parsley (Note: Tom Parsley was elected in 2007 as a candidate for the Liberal Democrats in Yeovil South.)	193		
Independent	Kim Bicknell	127		
Independent	Nick Hester	96		
Turnout			35.8	
Registered electors		5,613		
Liberal Democrats hold				
Liberal Democrats hold				
Liberal Democrats hold				

=== Yeovil East ===
Yeovil East (3 seats)
Party	Candidate	Votes	%	±%
Liberal Democrats	Tony Lock*	801		
Liberal Democrats	Tony Fife*	690		
Liberal Democrats	David Recardo*	620		
Labour	Colin Rose	405		
Labour	Bill Byrd	387		
UKIP	Godfrey Davey	264		
Conservative	Paul Bradly	257		
Conservative	Christine Bryant	246		
UKIP	Jess Thompson-Hughes	208		
UKIP	Margaret Thompson-Hughes	190		
Independent	Kay Bryan	98		
Conservative	Tom Phillips	73		
Independent	Simon Hester	59		
Turnout			30.9	
Registered electors		5,483		
Liberal Democrats hold				
Liberal Democrats hold				
Liberal Democrats hold				

=== Yeovil South ===
Yeovil South (3 seats)
Party	Candidate	Votes	%	±%
Liberal Democrats	Dave Greene*	1,167		
Conservative	Marcus Fysh	1,064		
Conservative	Nigel Gage	1,036		
Liberal Democrats	Maggie Foot	1,030		
Conservative	Bill McNaught	1,000		
Liberal Democrats	Alan Smith*	835		
Labour	Joe Conway	550		
Green	Martin Bailey	370		
Labour	Murray Shepstone	363		
Independent	John Grana	121		
Turnout			43.3	
Registered electors		6,853		
Liberal Democrats hold				
Conservative gain from Liberal Democrats				
Conservative gain from Liberal Democrats				

=== Yeovil West ===
Yeovil West (3 seats)
Party	Candidate	Votes	%	±%
Liberal Democrats	Ian Martin*	969		
Liberal Democrats	Wes Read	959		
Liberal Democrats	Tim Carroll (Note: Tim Carroll was elected in 2007 as a candidate for the Liberal Democrats in Wincanton.)	811		
Conservative	Maria MacDonald	606		
Conservative	Sabrina Johnston	590		
Conservative	Joshua Williams	544		
Labour	Rich Rendell	447		
Labour	Lee Skevington	330		
Green	Katherine Limmer	315		
Independent	Phil Holloway	119		
Turnout			38.3	
Registered electors		5,623		
Liberal Democrats hold				
Liberal Democrats hold				
Liberal Democrats hold				

=== Yeovil Without ===
Yeovil Without (3 seats)
Party	Candidate	Votes	%	±%
Liberal Democrats	Jon Gleeson	1,214		
Liberal Democrats	Pauline Lock	1,135		
Liberal Democrats	Graham Oakes	1,132		
Conservative	John Hanson	852		
Conservative	Ashley Sterling	846		
Conservative	Nick Rousell	800		
UKIP	Tony Turner	495		
Turnout			44.7	
Registered electors		5,720		
Liberal Democrats hold				
Liberal Democrats hold				
Liberal Democrats hold				
