= 1923 Yeovil by-election =

UK parliamentary by-election

- 30 October 1923

Candidate	Davies	Kelly	Cohen
Party	Unionist	Labour	Liberal
Popular vote	13,205	8,140	7,024
Percentage	46.6%	28.7%	24.8%
MP before election
Herbert
Unionist
Subsequent MP
Davies
Unionist

The 1923 Yeovil by-election was a parliamentary by-election for the British House of Commons constituency of Yeovil on 30 October 1923.

== Vacancy ==
The by-election was caused by the death of the sitting Unionist MP, Lt-Col. Hon. Aubrey Herbert on 26 September 1923. He had been MP here since winning the 1911 South Somerset by-election.

== Election history ==
Before Herbert won South Somerset in 1911, the seat had been Liberal since it was created in 1885. At the 1918 general election, he easily won Yeovil in a three cornered contest, thanks to the Coalition coupon. At that election, the Labour candidate, William Kelly finished second, well ahead of the Liberal. The Liberals did not run a candidate at the following general election, at which Herbert easily defeated Kelly. The result at the last general election was

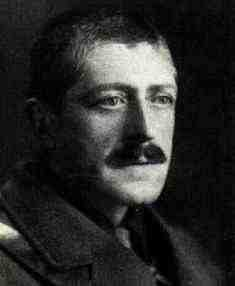
Aubrey Herbert

1922 general election: Yeovil
Party	Candidate	Votes	%	±%
Unionist	Aubrey Herbert	15,468	61.8	+11.3
Labour	William Kelly	9,581	38.3	+1.9
Majority		5,887	23.5	+9.4
Turnout		25,049	73.0	+11.2
Unionist hold		Swing	+4.7	

== Candidates ==
48-year-old Maj. George Davies was chosen by the Yeovil Unionists to defend the seat. He was born in Honolulu in Hawaii. He was educated at Uppingham School and then at King's College, Cambridge. During the First World War, he served in The Gloucestershire Regiment.

The Yeovil Constituency Labour Party once again selected 49-year-old William Kelly. He was contesting Yeovil for the third time. He was a Manchester educated Engineer and Trade Union Officer.

The Yeovil Liberal Association selected as candidate, 44-year-old Lt-Col. Charles Waley Cohen. He was a Barrister who served in the Army from 1915 to 1921. He was Mentioned in dispatches, awarded the CMG and the Légion d’honneur.

== Campaign ==
Polling Day was set for 30 October 1923, thirty four days after the death of Herbert.

== Result ==
On a turnout well up on the last general election, Davies comfortably held the seat for the Unionists. The strong Liberal poll was the feature of the result. The Liberal intervention had marginally damaged the Unionists more than Labour.

Yeovil by-election, 1923
Party	Candidate	Votes	%	±%
Unionist	George Davies	13,205	46.6	−15.2
Labour	William Kelly	8,140	28.7	−9.6
Liberal	Charles Waley Cohen	7,024	24.8	New
Majority		5,065	17.9	−5.7
Turnout		28,369	80.8	+7.8
Unionist hold		Swing	-2.8	

== Aftermath ==
Davies held the seat at the following general election, and went on to hold the seat until retirement in 1945. Kelly had one last attempt at Yeovil but finished a poor third. He then sought election elsewhere and was returned at Rochdale in 1924. The Liberal improvement at the by-election continued as they established themselves as the main challenger to the Unionists locally. Cohen fought the seat a further two occasions without success, before contesting Portsmouth Central in 1929. The result at the following general election;

1923 general election: Yeovil
Party	Candidate	Votes	%	±%
Unionist	George Davies	12,690	44.5	−2.1
Liberal	Charles Waley Cohen	10,715	37.6	+12.8
Labour	William Kelly	5,080	17.8	−10.9
Majority		1,975	6.9	−11.0
Turnout		28,485		
Unionist hold		Swing	-7.5	

== See also ==
- List of United Kingdom by-elections
- United Kingdom by-election records
