= Somerset South =

Somerset South may refer to:

- South Somerset, a local government district in Somerset, England
- South Somerset (UK Parliament constituency) (1885–1918)
