= Charles Waley Cohen =

British Army soldier and barrister

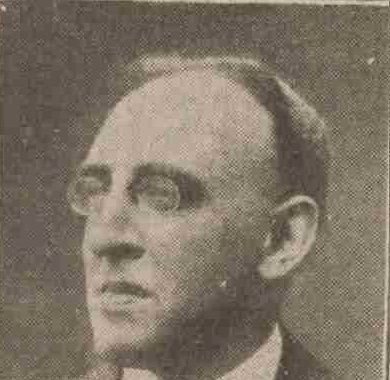

Lt-Col Charles Waley Cohen CMG CBE (1879 – 16 January 1963), was a British soldier, barrister and Liberal Party politician.

== Background ==
Cohen was born the third son of Nathaniel Louis Cohen, a stock broker, and Julia Matilda Waley. Robert Waley Cohen (1877–1952) was his brother and Dorothea Waley Singer (1882–1964) was his sister. He was educated at Clifton College and Balliol College, Oxford. He married in 1909. He was made a Commander of the Order of the British Empire in the 1919 Birthday Honours.

== Professional career ==
Cohen was a Barrister who was Called to Bar in 1903. He served in the Army from 1915 to 1921. He was Mentioned in dispatches, awarded the CMG and the Légion d’honneur.

== Political career ==
Cohen was Liberal candidate for the Yeovil division of Somerset at the 1923 Yeovil by-election and at the 1923 General Election shortly after. He was Liberal candidate for the Portsmouth Central division of Hampshire at the 1929 General Election. He did not stand for parliament again.

=== Electoral record ===
1923 Yeovil by-election
Party	Candidate	Votes	%	±%
Unionist	George Davies	13,205	46.6	−15.2
Labour	William Kelly	8,140	28.7	−9.6
Liberal	Charles Cohen	7,024	24.8	n/a
Majority			17.9	−5.7
Turnout			80.8	+7.8
Unionist hold		Swing	-2.8	

1923 General Election: Yeovil
Party	Candidate	Votes	%	±%
Unionist	George Davies	12,690	44.5	−2.1
Liberal	Charles Cohen	10,715	37.6	+12.8
Labour	William Kelly	5,080	17.8	−10.9
Majority		1,975	6.9	−14.9
Turnout				
Unionist hold		Swing	-7.5	

General Election 1929: Portsmouth Central
Party	Candidate	Votes	%	±%
Labour	Glenvil Hall	15,153	42.4	+7.9
Unionist	Thomas Comyn-Platt	13,628	38.1	−8.0
Liberal	Charles Cohen	6,993	19.5	+0.1
Majority		1,525	4.3	15.9
Turnout			74.3	−6.0
Labour gain from Unionist		Swing	+7.9	
