= John Peyton, Baron Peyton of Yeovil =

The Right Honourable The Lord Peyton of Yeovil PC FZS

Shadow Minister of Agriculture, Fisheries and Food
- In office 19 November 1976 – 4 May 1979
- Leader: Margaret Thatcher
- Preceded by: Michael Jopling
- Succeeded by: Roy Mason

Shadow Leader of the House of Commons
- In office 29 October 1974 – 19 November 1976
- Leader: Edward Heath
- Preceded by: Jim Prior
- Succeeded by: Francis Pym

Minister of Transport
- In office 23 June 1970 – 15 October 1970
- Prime Minister: Edward Heath
- Preceded by: Fred Mulley
- Succeeded by: Peter Walker

Member of Parliament for Yeovil
- In office 25 October 1951 – 13 May 1983
- Preceded by: William Kingsmill
- Succeeded by: Paddy Ashdown

Member of the House of Lords
- Lord Temporal
- Life peerage 5 October 1983 – 22 November 2006

Personal details
- Born: John Wynne William Peyton; 13 February 1919 London, England
- Died: 22 November 2006 (aged 87) London, England
- Party: Conservative
- Spouses: Diana Clinch (m. 1947; div. 1966) Mary Cobbold (m. 1966)
- Children: 3 (by Clinch)
- Education: Eton College
- Alma mater: Trinity College, Oxford

Military service
- Allegiance: United Kingdom
- Branch/service: British Army
- Rank: Captain
- Unit: 15th/19th The King's Royal Hussars

John Wynne William Peyton, Baron Peyton of Yeovil, PC, FZS (13 February 1919 – 22 November 2006) was a British Conservative politician. He was Member of Parliament for Yeovil for over 31 years, from 1951 to 1983, and an early and leading member of the Conservative Monday Club. He served as Minister of Transport (later renamed Minister of Transport Industries in the Department of the Environment) from 1970 to 1974. He was a candidate for leader of the Conservative Party in 1975, losing to Margaret Thatcher.

== Early years ==
Peyton was born in Mayfair in 1919, and was educated at Eton College. As a member of the Eton OTC, he was a member of the honour guard within the grounds of Windsor Castle at the state funeral of King George V in 1936. He read law at Trinity College, Oxford, from 1937, but took a commission in the 15/19 Hussars in 1939 on the outbreak of World War II. He was sent to France as part of the British Expeditionary Force, but was captured in Belgium in May 1940, and spent five years in German prisoner of war camps, first in Laufen in Bavaria, then Warburg in Westphalia, then Eichstätt in Bavaria in mid 1942, and finally Moosburg in Bavaria from early 1945. He was liberated by American troops later in 1945. A brother was killed at St Nazaire in 1942.

Peyton studied law while confined, and became a barrister, being called to the bar in 1945. He accompanied Sir Walter Monckton, advisor to the Nizam of Hyderabad, to India in 1946 and 1947, in the run up to Indian independence. He became a broker at Lloyd's of London in 1947, and then pursued a political career.

Peyton was promoted to captain on 31 May 1949.

== Marriages ==
He was married twice. He married Diana, daughter of Douglas Clinch, in 1947, but was divorced in early 1966. They had two sons, one of whom died young, and a daughter. He remarried on 27 July 1966, to Mary Cobbold, daughter of Colonel Humphrey Wyndham (also her second marriage).

== Politics ==
Peyton unsuccessfully contested the safe Labour seat of Bristol Central for the Conservative Party in the 1950 general election. He was subsequently elected a Member of Parliament for Yeovil in the 1951 general election. He became Parliamentary Private Secretary to Nigel Birch, a junior defence minister, from 1952 to 1958. He supported the Suez War. He then served as Parliamentary Secretary to Richard Wood and Frederick Erroll, the Ministers of Power from 1962 to 1964. He remained opposition spokesman on power in opposition, until 1966.

He became Minister of Transport in the government of Edward Heath after the 1970 general election, one of six Monday Club MP members to achieve high office. His ministerial office was renamed Minister of Transport Industries when it was combined into the new Department of the Environment in October 1970. He remained in this position until the February 1974 general election. He was in office when the Mersey Docks and Harbour Board collapsed; he privatised British Rail's travel agency, Thomas Cook & Son, in 1972; and made helmets compulsory for motorcyclists. He also delivered a Green paper that proposed the Channel Tunnel.

He became Shadow Leader of the House of Commons in opposition. In 1975, he sought to become leader of the Conservative Party, standing in the second ballot after Margaret Thatcher defeated Edward Heath in the first ballot. He gained only eleven votes in the election, coming bottom of the poll, and Thatcher was elected by a convincing majority. He was shadow Minister for Agriculture in Thatcher's shadow cabinet. He was offered the position of Minister of Transport after the Conservative victory in the 1979 general election, but refused to return to his old office, and became the only member of the shadow cabinet not to secure a ministerial position in the new government. Disappointed at not being offered any other post, this reportedly strained his relationship with Thatcher.

Peyton stood down from the House of Commons at the 1983 general election, and Yeovil was won by Paddy Ashdown for the Liberal Party. Peyton was created a life peer as Baron Peyton of Yeovil, of Yeovil in the County of Somerset on 5 October 1983.

He held right-wing views, but consistently opposed capital punishment, and he led a rebellion against the privatisation of the British rail industry under John Major in 1990. He also supported reform of the House of Lords to create a wholly directly elected second chamber, and a smaller House of Commons in which terms ran seven years instead of five.

== Outside politics ==
Peyton was chairman of the British subsidiary of the Texas Instruments from 1974 to 1990. He also held positions with the London and Manchester Assurance Company, Trusthouse Forte, and British Aluminium, of which he was chairman from 1987 to 1991. He was treasurer of the Zoological Society of London from 1984 to 1991.

He published an autobiography, Without Benefit of Laundry in 1997, and a biography of Solly Zuckerman in 2001.

Peyton died from multiple organ failure at St George's Hospital in London on 22 November 2006. He was survived by his second wife, Mary, and his daughter and surviving son from his first marriage.

== Arms ==
Coat of arms of John Peyton, Baron Peyton of Yeovil
Crest A griffin sejant Or. Escutcheon Sable a cross engrailed in the first quarter a mullet Or. Supporters Dexter on a mount Vert with four oak sprigs growing therefrom fructed Or a bull rampant reguardant in trian aspect Sable armed membered the tail tuft and muzzle Or unguled Gules holding in the mouth an oak sprig fructed Or and a shamrock slipped Vert; sinister on a mount Vert growing therefrom four shamrocks slipped Proper a griffin sergeant reguardant Or grasping in the beak a shamrock slipped Proper and an oak sprig fructed Gold. Motto Patior Potior

Parliament of the United Kingdom
Preceded by William Kingsmill	Member of Parliament for Yeovil; 1951–1983	Succeeded by Paddy Ashdown
