= William Kingsmill (politician) =

British soldier, politician and businessman (1905–1971)

Lieutenant-Colonel William Henry Kingsmill DSO MC (1 December 1905 – 3 June 1971) was a British politician and businessman. He served as a Conservative Member of Parliament for Yeovil from 1945 to 1951.

== Early career ==
William Henry Kingsmill was born on 1 December 1905, the son of Andrew de Portal Kingsmill, an Army officer, and his wife Gladys Johnston. His parents divorced in 1920.

After early education at Ludgrove School, Kingsmill attended Eton and the Royal Military College, Sandhurst, he joined the Grenadier Guards, his father's regiment, in 1920. He served for nine years before transferring to the reserves in 1929 and returning to civilian life. The same year, he married Aileen Smith; the marriage did not last, and the couple divorced. He remarried in 1939, to Diana Smith, the widow of an Army officer. There were no children from either marriage.

He worked as a businessman and company director until August 1939, when he rejoined the Grenadiers. He served in the Battle of France, where he was awarded the Military Cross, and then with the Eighth Army in North Africa and the Italian Campaign, where he was awarded the Distinguished Service Order. During 1943-44 he commanded the 6th Battalion Grenadier Guards in Italy.

== Parliament ==
Kingsmill was elected the Member of Parliament for Yeovil in the 1945 general election, with a very narrow majority of 174 votes, and held the seat in the 1950 general election. He retired the following year, and did not contest the seat in 1951.

From 1946 onwards, he worked as a company director and chairman. He was the chairman and managing director of Taylor Walker & Co, a brewery, and a director of Slough Estates (now Segro).

== Notes ==
Parliament of the United Kingdom
| Preceded by George Davies | Member of Parliament for Yeovil; 1945–1951 | Succeeded by John Peyton |
