= Wessex (ward) =

Former electoral ward in Somerset, England

Coordinates: 51.07°N 2.73°W

Wessex was an electoral ward of South Somerset District Council in Somerset, England. It was one of the wards that made up the parliamentary constituency of Somerton and Frome.

Wessex covered an area of 3,800 hectares (9,400 acres) and in 2011 a population of 5,402 was recorded.

The small town of Somerton was the main settlement in the ward, which also included Compton Dundon.

The ward was represented by two councillors; in the 2015 South Somerset District Council election one Conservative Party candidate and one Liberal Democrat candidate were elected.
