= 2019 South Somerset District Council election =

2019 UK local government election

Map of the results of the 2019 South Somerset District Council election. Conservatives in blue, Liberal Democrats in yellow and independents in grey.

The 2019 South Somerset District Council election took place on 2 May 2019 to elect members of South Somerset District Council in Somerset, England. The whole council was up for election on new boundaries. The Liberal Democrats held the council with an increased majority, up from 1 to 22.

== Result Summary ==
2019 South Somerset District Council election
Party	Seats	Gains	Losses	Net gain/loss	Seats %	Votes %	Votes	+/−
Liberal Democrats	41			▲12	68.3	48.3	40,680	
Conservative	15			▼13	25.0	35.9	30,233	
Independent	4			▲1	6.7	5.3	4,484	
Green	0			Steady	0.0	4.6	3,840	
Labour	0			Steady	0.0	3.9	3,315	
UKIP	0			Steady	0.0	1.9	1,603	

== Results by Ward ==
=== Blackdown & Tatworth ===
Blackdown & Tatworth
Party	Candidate	Votes	%	±%
Liberal Democrats	Jenny Kenton*	805	46.1	
Conservative	Martin John Wale*	759	43.5	
Independent	Malcolm Andrew Turpin*	711	40.7	
Conservative	Gemma Trudy Vernon	535	30.6	
UKIP	Neil James Arnold	309	17.7	
Majority				
Turnout		1,746	42.6	
Liberal Democrats win (new seat)				
Conservative win (new seat)				

=== Blackmoor Vale ===
Blackmoor Vale
Party	Candidate	Votes	%	±%
Conservative	Hayward Burt	1,099	60.1	
Conservative	William Wallace*	1,032	56.4	
Liberal Democrats	Lynsey Wilson	523	28.6	
Liberal Democrats	Jane Pamela Clark	511	27.9	
Labour	Michael Andrew Yianni	204	11.1	
Majority				
Turnout		1,830	39.1	
Conservative win (new seat)				
Conservative win (new seat)				

=== Bruton ===
Bruton
Party	Candidate	Votes	%	±%
Conservative	Lucy Clare Trimnell	310	33.3	−23
Liberal Democrats	Abi Baker	302	32.5	+12
Green	Ewan William George Jones	239	25.7	+10
Labour	Daniel Britton	79	8.5	−
Majority				
Turnout		930	46.9	
Conservative win (new seat)				

=== Brympton ===
Brympton
Party	Candidate	Votes	%	±%
Liberal Democrats	Peter Jeremy Seib*	1,095	58.4	
Liberal Democrats	Jeny Snell	1,022	54.5	
Liberal Democrats	Alan Barry Smith*	875	46.7	
Conservative	Josh Williams	740	39.5	
Conservative	Sarah Helena Lindsay*	623	33.2	
Conservative	Graham Pritchard	504	26.9	
Labour	Olivia Morwenna Darling-Finan	189	10.1	
Majority				
Turnout		1,875	31.4	
Liberal Democrats win (new seat)				
Liberal Democrats win (new seat)				
Liberal Democrats win (new seat)				

=== Burrow Hill ===
Burrow Hill
Party	Candidate	Votes	%	±%
Liberal Democrats	Mike Stanton	554	50.2	
Conservative	Derek Norman Lander Yeomans*	550	49.8	
Majority				
Turnout		1,104	46.6	
Liberal Democrats win (new seat)				

=== Camelot ===
Camelot
Party	Candidate	Votes	%	±%
Conservative	Mike Lewis*	639	67.4	−1
Liberal Democrats	Gordon John Hunting	309	32.6	+18
Majority				
Turnout		948	43.7	
Conservative win (new seat)				

=== Cary ===
Cary
Party	Candidate	Votes	%	±%
Liberal Democrats	Henry Hobhouse*	1,214	57.0	
Liberal Democrats	Kevin Messenger	1,160	54.4	
Conservative	Nick Weeks*	852	40.0	
Conservative	Sarah Helena Lindsay	812	38.1	
Labour	John Michael Thompson	102	4.8	
Majority				
Turnout		2,131	50.7	
Liberal Democrats win (new seat)				
Liberal Democrats win (new seat)				

=== Chard Avishayes ===
Chard Avishayes
Party	Candidate	Votes	%	±%
Liberal Democrats	Garry Frederick Shortland*	254	46.4	+10
Independent	Cath Morrison	163	29.8	+12
Conservative	Ryan John William Jones	130	23.8	−9
Majority				
Turnout		547	27.6	
Liberal Democrats win (new seat)				

=== Chard Combe ===
Chard Combe
Party	Candidate	Votes	%	±%
Liberal Democrats	Patricia Maureen O'Brien	374	61.7	
Conservative	Victoria Elizabeth May Whiteman	232	38.3	
Majority				
Turnout		606	30.8	
Liberal Democrats win (new seat)				

=== Chard Crimchard ===
Chard Crimchard
Party	Candidate	Votes	%	±%
Liberal Democrats	Martin John Carnell	367	52.3	−14
Green	Timothy Michael Eggins	174	24.8	N/A
Conservative	Margaret Norah Twidale	161	22.9	−11
Majority				
Turnout		702	35.0	
Liberal Democrats win (new seat)				

=== Chard Holyrood ===
Chard Holyrood
Party	Candidate	Votes	%	±%
Liberal Democrats	Jason Paul Baker*	449	54.1	
Independent	Melissa Louise Whittaker-Mather	221	26.6	
Conservative	Nick White	160	19.3	
Majority				
Turnout		830	36.1	
Liberal Democrats win (new seat)				

=== Chard Jocelyn ===
Chard Jocelyn
Party	Candidate	Votes	%	±%
Independent	Dave Bulmer	412	65.3	+15
Liberal Democrats	Zak Henry Williams	152	24.1	+4
Conservative	Russ Wardell	67	10.6	−19
Majority				
Turnout		631	33.6	
Independent win (new seat)				

=== Coker ===
Coker
Party	Candidate	Votes	%	±%
Conservative	Gina Seaton*	919	50.0	
Liberal Democrats	Nicola Clark	878	47.8	
Conservative	Rod Jones	799	43.5	
Liberal Democrats	Tanya Serena Lynam	730	39.7	
Labour	Jane Elizabeth Carter-Uren	168	9.1	
Majority				
Turnout		1,838	42.9	
Conservative win (new seat)				
Liberal Democrats win (new seat)				

=== Crewkerne ===
Crewkerne
Party	Candidate	Votes	%	±%
Liberal Democrats	Mike Best*	1,239	51.6	
Liberal Democrats	Ben Hodgson	990	41.2	
Liberal Democrats	Robin Christopher Pailthorpe	939	39.1	
Conservative	Marcus Morton Barrett*	726	30.2	
Conservative	Paul Bradly	699	29.1	
Conservative	Robert Drew Belobaba	579	24.1	
Green	Ben Hartshorn	547	22.8	
UKIP	Arthur Sidney Hamlin	371	15.5	
Labour	Gary David Swain	287	12.0	
Majority				
Turnout		2,401	37.2	
Liberal Democrats win (new seat)				
Liberal Democrats win (new seat)				
Liberal Democrats win (new seat)				

=== Curry Rivel, Huish & Langport Ward ===
Curry Rivel, Huish & Langport Ward
Party	Candidate	Votes	%	±%
Conservative	Tiffany Osborne*	709	45.4	
Conservative	Clare Paul*	631	40.4	
Green	Matthew Francis Geen	413	26.4	
Liberal Democrats	David John Harrison	324	20.7	
Liberal Democrats	Kate Alexandra Pettemerides	302	19.3	
Green	Catherine Emma Mowat	293	18.7	
Labour	Sean Adam Dromgoole	243	15.5	
Majority				
Turnout		1,563	34.2	
Conservative win (new seat)				
Conservative win (new seat)				

=== Eggwood ===
Eggwood
Party	Candidate	Votes	%	±%
Liberal Democrats	Paul Michael Maxwell*	449	54.2	
Independent	Steve Ashton	241	29.1	
Conservative	Mark Alexander Keating	139	16.8	
Majority				
Turnout		829	41.8	
Liberal Democrats win (new seat)				

=== Hamdon ===
Hamdon
Party	Candidate	Votes	%	±%
Liberal Democrats	Mike Hewitson	769	77.1	+20
Conservative	Graham Harold Middleton*	229	22.9	−20
Majority				
Turnout		998	45.5	
Liberal Democrats win (new seat)				

=== Ilminster ===
Ilminster
Party	Candidate	Votes	%	±%
Liberal Democrats	Val Keitch*	945	56.2	
Liberal Democrats	Brian James Hamilton	710	42.2	
Conservative	Veronica Horman	443	26.4	
Green	Henry Peter Lansdown	361	21.5	
Conservative	Wendy Elizabeth Outram	319	19.0	
Labour	Ian Rupert MacKillop	123	7.3	
Majority				
Turnout		1,681	37.2	
Liberal Democrats win (new seat)				
Liberal Democrats win (new seat)				

=== Islemoor ===
Islemoor
Party	Candidate	Votes	%	±%
Conservative	Malcolm John Cavill	446	53.7	
Liberal Democrats	Mark David Harry Blackburn	265	31.9	
UKIP	Serena Lonton	120	14.4	
Majority				
Turnout		831	43.9	
Conservative win (new seat)				

=== Martock ===
Martock
Party	Candidate	Votes	%	±%
Liberal Democrats	Neil Bloomfield*	1,035	63.6	
Liberal Democrats	Louise Clarke	843	51.8	
Conservative	Lindsay Colebrooke	491	30.3	
Conservative	Paul Arthur Dean	468	28.7	
Labour	Peter Charles Ludbrook	229	14.1	
Majority				
Turnout		1,628	35.5	
Liberal Democrats win (new seat)				
Liberal Democrats win (new seat)				

=== Milborne Port ===
Milborne Port
Party	Candidate	Votes	%	±%
Liberal Democrats	Sarah Joanne Dyke*	656	72.1	+27
Conservative	Louise Wallace	254	27.9	−17
Majority				
Turnout		910	38.0	
Liberal Democrats win (new seat)				

=== Neroche ===
Neroche
Party	Candidate	Votes	%	±%
Conservative	Linda Patricia Vijeh	577	61.4	+4
Liberal Democrats	Andy Kenton	244	26.0	+2
UKIP	Clive Mark Rust	118	12.6	−7
Majority				
Turnout		939	45.9	
Conservative win (new seat)				

=== Northstone, Ivelchester & St Michael's Ward ===
Northstone, Ivelchester & St Michael's
Party	Candidate	Votes	%	±%
Independent	Tony Capozzoli*	1,493	60.2	
Liberal Democrats	Paul Thomas Rowsell	1,022	41.2	
Conservative	Charlie Hull	980	39.5	
Conservative	Alexander Christie Priest	908	36.6	
Conservative	Christopher Antony Le Hardy	678	27.3	
Majority				
Turnout		2,479	36.9	
Independent win (new seat)				
Liberal Democrats win (new seat)				
Conservative win (new seat)				

=== Parrett ===
Parrett
Party	Candidate	Votes	%	±%
Liberal Democrats	Anthony Stephen Vaughan	575	64.5	+13
Conservative	Jason Anthony Bradley	316	35.5	−13
Majority		891	45.5	
Turnout				
Liberal Democrats win (new seat)				

=== South Petherton ===
South Petherton
Party	Candidate	Votes	%	±%
Liberal Democrats	Adam James Dance*	1,803	78.7	
Liberal Democrats	Crispin Kenneth Raikes*	1,327	57.9	
Conservative	Kate Wylie-Carrick	414	18.1	
Conservative	Teresa Sienkiewicz	406	17.7	
Green	Colin John Comben	343	15.0	
Majority				
Turnout		2,291	51.5	
Liberal Democrats win (new seat)				
Liberal Democrats win (new seat)				

=== Tower ===
Tower
Party	Candidate	Votes	%	±%
Conservative	Robin Frederick Bastable	407	43.2	−19
Liberal Democrats	Gordon Dugald Thomson Czapiewski	283	30.0	+14
Green	Oliver Hugh Arnold Dowding	253	26.8	+9
Majority				
Turnout		943	48.5	
Conservative win (new seat)				

=== Turn Hill ===
Turn Hill
Party	Candidate	Votes	%	±%
Independent	Gerard Thiery Tucker	622	59.6	
Conservative	David Wall	215	20.6	
Liberal Democrats	Julia Mary Frances Gadd	142	13.6	
Labour	Guy Christopher Smith	64	6.1	
Majority				
Turnout		1,043	49.6	
Independent win (new seat)				

=== Wessex ===
Wessex
Party	Candidate	Votes	%	±%
Independent	Dean Douglas Ruddle*	1,005	54.4	
Liberal Democrats	Tim Kerley	636	34.4	
Conservative	Manda Caroline Adams	560	30.3	
Liberal Democrats	Stephen Richard John Page*	547	29.6	
Conservative	Shane Andrew Pledger*	352	19.0	
Labour	Gemma Marie Reynalds	112	6.1	
Majority				
Turnout		1,849	41.9	
Independent win (new seat)				
Liberal Democrats win (new seat)				

=== Wincanton ===
Wincanton
Party	Candidate	Votes	%	±%
Conservative	Colin Winder*	715	54.7	
Conservative	Nick Colbert*	692	52.9	
Liberal Democrats	Ian Stewart	472	36.1	
Labour	Lizzy Ralph	372	28.5	
Majority				
Turnout		1,307	28.8	
Conservative win (new seat)				
Conservative win (new seat)				

=== Windwhistle ===
Windwhistle
Party	Candidate	Votes	%	±%
Conservative	Sue Osborne*	557	56.9	
Liberal Democrats	Ray Buckler	422	43.1	
Majority				
Turnout		979	49.0	
Conservative win (new seat)				

=== Yeovil College ===
Yeovil College
Party	Candidate	Votes	%	±%
Liberal Democrats	Andy Kendall*	932	55.6	
Liberal Democrats	Peter Arnold Gubbins*	895	53.4	
Liberal Democrats	Kaysar Hussain*	864	51.6	
Conservative	Ash Strelling	375	22.4	
UKIP	Godfrey Davey	345	20.6	
Conservative	Anthony Power	340	20.3	
Labour	Martin Ronald Bailey	268	16.0	
Conservative	Vural Taspinar	237	14.1	
Majority				
Turnout		1,676	26.0	
Liberal Democrats win (new seat)				
Liberal Democrats win (new seat)				
Liberal Democrats win (new seat)				

=== Yeovil Lyde ===
Yeovil Lyde
Party	Candidate	Votes	%	±%
Liberal Democrats	Tony Lock*	648	56.0	
Liberal Democrats	David Charles Recardo*	528	45.6	
Conservative	Cameron David George Britten	237	20.5	
Green	Karen Ann Stutz	233	20.1	
Conservative	Jon Britten	223	19.3	
Labour	Terry Ledlie	197	17.0	
Majority				
Turnout		1,158	24.5	
Liberal Democrats win (new seat)				
Liberal Democrats win (new seat)				

=== Yeovil Summerlands ===
Yeovil Summerlands
Party	Candidate	Votes	%	±%
Liberal Democrats	John Ernle Clark*	1,050	53.2	
Liberal Democrats	Wes Read*	1,046	53.0	
Liberal Democrats	Pauline Annette Lock	1,012	51.2	
Conservative	Mick Beales	453	22.9	
Conservative	Tony Ash	421	21.3	
Conservative	Bridget Mary Philomena Spender	330	16.7	
Green	Diane Catherine Wood	245	12.4	
Green	Alan John Flint	206	10.4	
Green	Robert Charles Wood	179	9.1	
Labour	Jay Parsons	130	6.6	
Labour	Christos Zaranis	120	6.1	
Labour	Nicolas Riva	119	6.0	
Majority				
Turnout		1,975	29.1	
Liberal Democrats win (new seat)				
Liberal Democrats win (new seat)				
Liberal Democrats win (new seat)				

=== Yeovil Westland ===
Yeovil Westland
Party	Candidate	Votes	%	±%
Liberal Democrats	Karl William Gill	905	45.1	
Liberal Democrats	Andy Soughton	805	40.1	
Liberal Democrats	David Alexander Gubbins	792	39.5	
Conservative	George Alan Dagnall	638	31.8	
Conservative	Nigel James Gage*	610	30.4	
Conservative	Paul James McHugh	549	27.4	
Green	Michael James Vickery	354	17.7	
Labour	Joe Conway	309	15.4	
Majority				
Turnout		2,005	32.9	
Liberal Democrats win (new seat)				
Liberal Democrats win (new seat)				
Liberal Democrats win (new seat)				

=== Yeovil Without ===
Yeovil Without
Party	Candidate	Votes	%	±%
Liberal Democrats	Graham John Oakes*	941	55.5	
Liberal Democrats	Mike Lock*	910	53.7	
Liberal Democrats	Rob Stickland*	839	49.5	
Conservative	Imogen Fenner	495	29.2	
Conservative	Julie Anne Tomsett	478	28.2	
Conservative	Keith William Weston	455	26.8	
UKIP	Dave Parsons	340	20.0	
Majority				
Turnout		1,696	31.1	
Liberal Democrats win (new seat)				
Liberal Democrats win (new seat)				
Liberal Democrats win (new seat)				

== By-elections ==
Neroche, 3 March 2022
Party	Candidate	Votes	%	±%
Liberal Democrats	Ray Buckler	390	52.8	▲26.8
Conservative	Kate Wylie-Carrick	315	42.6	▼18.8
Green	Lynsey Arscott	19	2.6	New
Labour	Paul John Sellers	15	2.0	New
Majority		75	10.2	N/A
Turnout		739		
Liberal Democrats gain from Conservative		Swing	▲22.8	
