= Adam Dance =

British politician

Councillor Adam Dance MP
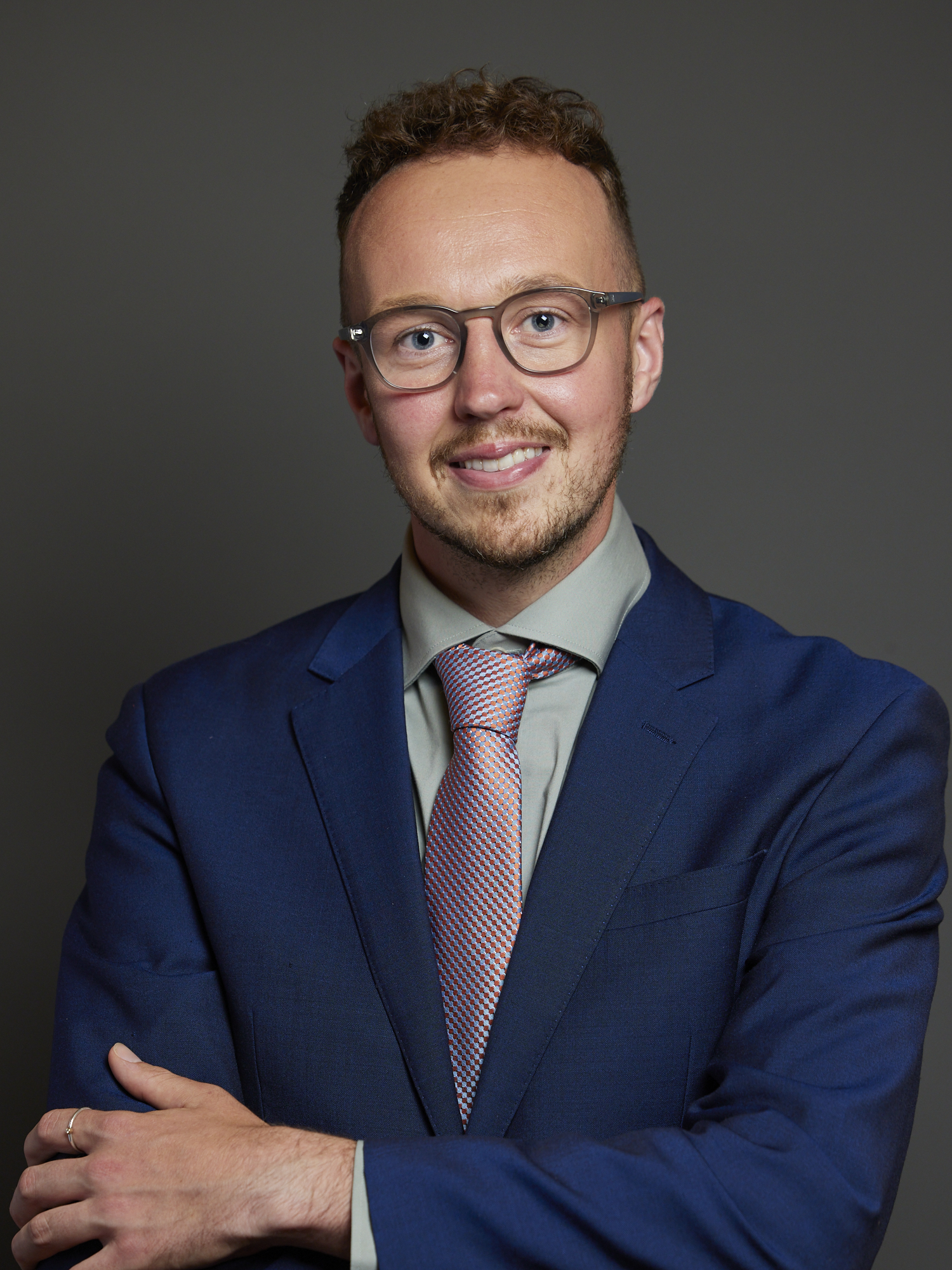
- Official portrait, 2024

Member of Parliament for Yeovil
- Incumbent
- Assumed office 4 July 2024
- Preceded by: Marcus Fysh
- Majority: 12,268 (25.2%)

Member of Somerset Council (Note: Somerset County Council until 1 April 2023) for South Petherton and Islemoor
- Incumbent
- Assumed office 8 May 2017

Member of South Somerset District Council for South Petherton
- In office 11 May 2015 – 1 April 2023

Personal details
- Born: Adam James Dance; 13 June 1992 (age 34) Yeovil, England
- Party: Liberal Democrats
- Education: University of Warwick

Adam James Dance (born 13 June 1992) is a British politician who has been Member of Parliament (MP) for Yeovil since 2024. A member of the Liberal Democrats, he gained the seat from Marcus Fysh of the Conservative Party. Dance has been a member of Somerset Council since 2017 and South Somerset District Council from 2015 to 2023.

== Early life and education ==
Dance was born and raised in Yeovil. He attended Stanchester Academy, and studied construction and landscape gardening at Taunton College and Yeovil College before starting his own landscape-gardening business. He graduated from Warwick Business School in 2023.

== Political career ==
Dance first became involved with the Liberal Democrats while campaigning for David Laws in the 2010 general election. In 2011, Dance became a member of the parish council of South Petherton; he was the chairman of the parish council until 2023.

In the 2015 election, Dance became a member of South Somerset District Council for the ward of South Petherton. Following his re-election in 2019, he joined the cabinet of the council as the portfolio holder for licensing and environmental health. He sat on the district council until its abolition in 2023.

Dance was elected to Somerset County Council in the 2017 election for the division of South Petherton and Islemoor, becoming the council's youngest member. He was re-elected in 2022 to the council, which was renamed Somerset Council on becoming a unitary authority in 2023. Dance became the council's lead member for public health, equalities and diversity. He stepped down from the role upon his election to Parliament in 2024.

Dance was selected as the Liberal Democrats' prospective parliamentary candidate for Yeovil in April 2023. In the 2024 general election, he defeated the Conservative incumbent, Marcus Fysh, with 48.5 per cent of the vote and a majority of 12,268.

On 29 November 2024 during the Assisted Dying Bill, Dance voted in favour.

== Personal life ==
Dance was diagnosed with severe dyslexia as a child. He stated in a 2023 interview that he has attention deficit hyperactivity disorder (ADHD). He also identifies as a member of the LGBTQ community. Dance cites Paddy Ashdown, a former leader of the Liberal Democrats and MP for Yeovil, as his political inspiration.

== Notes ==
Parliament of the United Kingdom
Preceded by Marcus Fysh	Member of Parliament for Yeovil; 2024–present	Incumbent
