= 1911 South Somerset by-election =

UK parliamentary by-election

The 1911 South Somerset by-election was a Parliamentary by-election held on 21 November 1911. The constituency returned one Member of Parliament (MP) to the House of Commons of the United Kingdom, elected by the first past the post voting system.

== Vacancy ==
Sir Edward Strachey the Liberal MP since 1892, was raised to the peerage as Baron Strachie, of Sutton Court in the County of Somerset and accepted ennoblement at start of November 1911 to join the House of Lords. This is in connection with the Parliament Act 1911, where many Liberal peers were created to overcome their relative deficit, a party having had renewed landslide political support of the people in the elected chamber.

== Electoral history ==
General election December 1910: South Somerset
Party	Candidate	Votes	%	±%
Liberal	Edward Strachey	4,784	52.6	−0.1
Conservative	Aubrey Herbert	4,317	47.4	+0.1
Majority		467	5.2	−0.2
Turnout		9,101	89.5	−3.0
Liberal hold		Swing	-0.1	

== Candidates ==
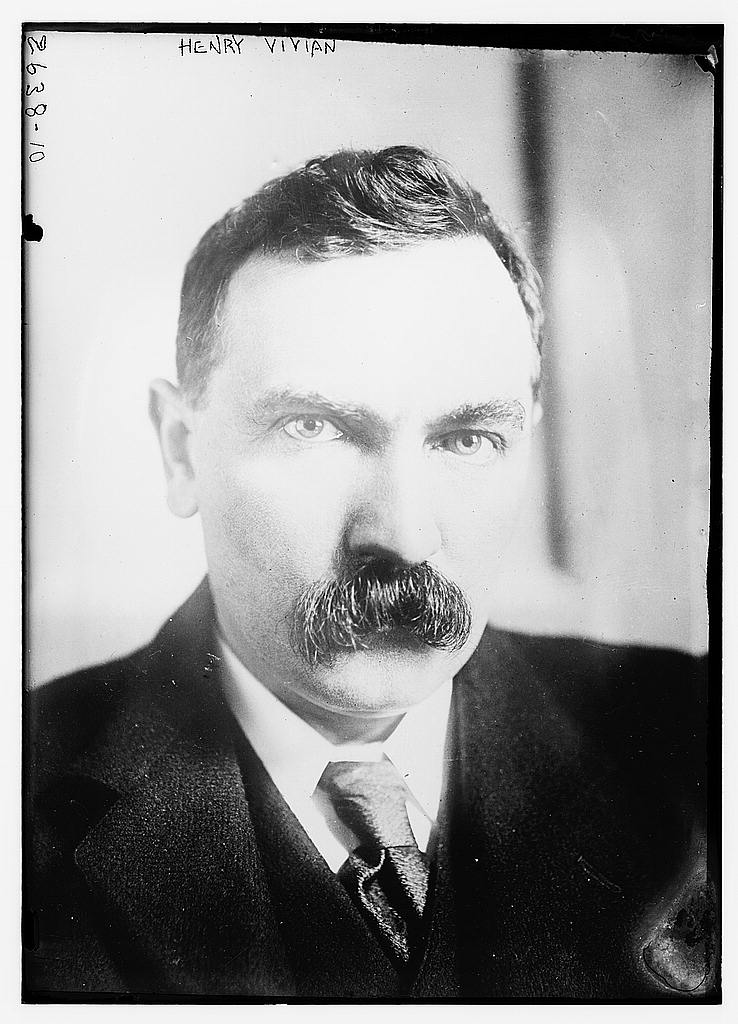
Henry Vivian

Henry Harvey Vivian, born in West Devon, was given the task of defending a seat that had been Liberal since it was created in 1885. He had been Liberal MP for Birkenhead until his defeat at the December 1910 general election.

The Conservative candidate was Hon. Aubrey Herbert who had stood here unsuccessfully in both 1910 general elections. He was second son of the 4th Earl of Carnarvon, whose family owned a small part of the district, including Pixton Park, West Somerset, one of his permanent main homes. A soldier, diplomat, traveller, and intelligence officer, he was later associated with the Albanian independence movement. He was twice offered that nation's throne. He died in 1923, aged 43.

== Campaign ==
The campaign seems to have fought mostly on the issue of the National Insurance Act. On 13 November, in a portent of things to come, the Unionists won a Liberal seat in a by-election at Oldham. Herbert entered polling day in a mood of great optimism

== Result ==
Aubrey Herbert gained the seat for the Conservative Party from the Liberal Party.

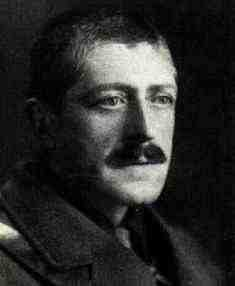
Aubrey Herbert

By-Election 21 November 1911: South Somerset
Party	Candidate	Votes	%	±%
Conservative	Aubrey Herbert	4,878	50.8	+3.4
Liberal	Henry Harvey Vivian	4,730	49.2	−3.4
Majority		148	1.6	N/A
Turnout		9,608	91.1	+1.6
Conservative gain from Liberal		Swing	+3.4	

== Aftermath ==
A General Election was due to take place by the end of 1915. By the autumn of 1914, the following candidates had been adopted to contest that election. Due to the outbreak of war, the election never took place.

- Unionist: Aubrey Herbert
- Liberal: Henry Harvey Vivian

For the 1918 elections, the seat grew eastwards, reflecting urban population rise elsewhere since 1885, to become "Yeovil"

General election 14 December 1918: Yeovil
Party	Candidate	Votes	%	±%
Unionist	*Aubrey Herbert	10,522	50.5	
Labour	W. T. Kelly	7,589	36.3	New
Liberal	J. R. Brough	2,743	13.2	
Majority		2,933	14.2	
Turnout		20,884		
Unionist win (new seat)				

- endorsed by the Coalition Government.
