= Aubrey Herbert =

British soldier, diplomat, traveller and intelligence officer (1880–1923)

Colonel The Honourable Aubrey Herbert DL
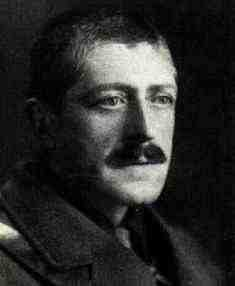

Member of Parliament for South Somerset
- In office 1911–1918
- Preceded by: Sir Edward Strachey
- Succeeded by: Constituency abolished

Member of Parliament for Yeovil
- In office 1918–1923
- Preceded by: Constituency established
- Succeeded by: George Davies

Personal details
- Born: Aubrey Nigel Henry Molyneux Herbert; 3 April 1880 Highclere Castle, Newbury, Berkshire
- Died: 23 September 1923 (aged 43) London, England
- Cause of death: Sepsis
- Party: Conservative
- Spouse: Mary Gertrude Vesey
- Children: 4
- Parent(s): Henry Herbert, 4th Earl of Carnarvon; Elizabeth Catherine Howard
- Education: Eton College
- Alma mater: Balliol College, Oxford

Military service
- Allegiance: United Kingdom
- Branch/service: British Army
- Rank: Colonel
- Unit: Irish Guards
- Battles/wars: World War I
- Awards: Order of the White Eagle

Detail of effigy of Hon. Aubrey Herbert in the Herbert Chapel, Church of St Nicholas, Brushford, Somerset

Effigy of Herbert in the Herbert Chapel, Brushford Church

Arms of Herbert: Per pale azure and gules, three lions rampant argent as visible in the Herbert Chapel

Arms of Hon. Aubrey Herbert, of six quarters with inescutcheon of pretence of Vesey, for his wife, an heraldic heiress. Herbert Chapel, Brushford Church

Colonel The Honourable Aubrey Nigel Henry Molyneux Herbert DL (3 April 1880 – 26 September 1923), of Pixton Park in Somerset and of Teversal, in Nottinghamshire, was a British soldier, diplomat, traveller, and intelligence officer associated with Albanian independence. He was twice offered the throne of Albania. From 1911 until his death he was a Conservative Member of Parliament. His eldest half-brother was George Herbert, 5th Earl of Carnarvon (1866–1923), who discovered the tomb of Tutankhamun.

== Origins ==
Aubrey Herbert was born at Highclere Castle in Hampshire, the second son of Henry Herbert, 4th Earl of Carnarvon, a wealthy landowner, British cabinet minister, and Lord Lieutenant of Ireland. His mother (his father's second wife and cousin) was Elizabeth Catherine Howard (1856–1929) ("Elsie"), a daughter of Henry Howard of Greystoke Castle, near Penrith, Cumberland, a son of Lord Henry Howard-Molyneux-Howard, younger brother of Bernard Howard, 12th Duke of Norfolk. Elizabeth Howard's brother was Esmé Howard, 1st Baron Howard of Penrith.

Aubrey Herbert was a younger half-brother of George Herbert, 5th Earl of Carnarvon, the noted Egyptologist who in 1922, together with Howard Carter, discovered Tutankhamun's tomb; he predeceased him by five months. From early childhood Aubrey developed eye problems which left him nearly blind, and resulted in a total loss of sight before the age of 40.

== Early life ==
Herbert was educated at Eton College. He obtained a first class degree in modern history from Balliol College, Oxford. He was famous for climbing the roofs of the university buildings, despite his near blindness. He numbered among his friends Adrian Carton de Wiart, Raymond Asquith, John Buchan, and Hilaire Belloc. Reginald Farrer remained close throughout his life. He was commissioned a second lieutenant in the Nottinghamshire (Sherwood Rangers) Yeomanry Cavalry on 12 January 1900, and promoted to lieutenant on 11 June 1902. His poor eyesight, however, prevented him from taking part in the South African War. Herbert received as a gift from his father the estate of Pixton Park in Somerset, with 5,000 acres (2,000 ha) of land, inherited by the Herbert family from Kitty Herbert, Countess of Carnarvon (née Acland), wife of Henry Herbert, 2nd Earl of Carnarvon.

His friendship with Middle Eastern traveller and advisor Sir Mark Sykes dates from his entry into parliament in 1911 when, with George Lloyd, they were the three youngest Conservative MPs. They shared an interest in foreign policy and worked closely in the Arab Bureau (1916). He was also a close friend of T. E. Lawrence; their letters do not feature in the standard Lawrence collections, but are quoted by Margaret Fitzherbert in her biography of her grandfather, The Man Who Was Greenmantle. (Greenmantle was one of John Buchan's novels about the adventurer Richard Hannay.)

== Languages and travels ==
Herbert was in his own right a considerable Orientalist, and a linguist who spoke French, Italian, German, Turkish, Arabic, Greek, and Albanian as well as English. A renowned traveller, especially in the Middle East, his trips include journeys through Japan, Yemen, Turkey, and Albania. Herbert often dressed as a tramp on his travels. During the period 1902–04, he was an honorary attaché in Tokyo, then in Constantinople (1904–05).

== Albania ==
Herbert became a passionate advocate of Albanian independence, having visited the country in 1907, 1911, and 1913. During a stay in Tirana (1913), he befriended Essad Pasha. When the Albanian delegates to the 1912–13 London Balkan Peace Conference arrived, they secured Herbert's assistance as an advisor. He was very active fighting for their cause and is regarded as having considerable influence on Albania's success at obtaining eventual independence in the resulting Treaty of London (1913). One of his constant correspondents on Albania was Edith Durham. He was twice offered the throne of Albania. On the first occasion in 1914, just before the outbreak of World War I, he was interested, but Prime Minister H. H. Asquith, a family friend, dissuaded him. The offer remained unofficial and was rejected by the Foreign Office. The Albanian crown went to William of Wied.

The second occasion the crown was offered was after the defeat of the Italian Army by the Albanians in September 1920. Again the offer was unofficial, although it was made on behalf of the Albanian Government. Herbert discussed the offer with Philip Kerr and Maurice Hankey, pursuing the idea of perhaps acting under the banner of the League of Nations; Eric Drummond, Herbert's friend, had become its first secretary general, and by lobbying led to Albania's acceptance as a member in the League of Nations in December 1920. With a change of foreign ministers in the Albanian Government, Herbert's chance of gaining a crown greatly diminished. In April 1921, the crown was, even more unofficially, offered to the Duke of Atholl by Jim Barnes of the British Friends of Albania residing in Italy.

== Parliament ==
Herbert was an independent-minded Conservative Member of Parliament (MP) for the Southern division of Somerset from 1911 to 1918, and for Yeovil from 1918 to his death. During his career, Herbert voiced his opposition to the policies of the British government in Ireland.

== First World War ==
=== 1914–1915 ===
Despite very poor eyesight, Herbert was able, at the outbreak of World War I in 1914, to join the Irish Guards, in which he served in a supernumerary position. He did this by purchasing a uniform and boarding a troopship bound for France. During the Battle of Mons, he was wounded and briefly taken prisoner. After a convalescence in England, and unable to rejoin due to his ocular disability, Aubrey was proposed for service in military intelligence in Egypt by Kitchener's military secretary, Oswald FitzGerald, via Mark Sykes (see Baghdad Railway). In January 1915, Herbert was attached to the Intelligence Department in Cairo under Colonel Gilbert Clayton. In mid-February, he was sent on an intelligence mission into the eastern Mediterranean aboard the cruiser HMS Bacchante.

When the Gallipoli campaign started, General Alexander Godley, formerly of the Irish Guards and second in command to General Birdwood of the Australian and New Zealand Army Corps (ANZAC), now commanding the New Zealanders, offered him an appointment as liaison officer and interpreter on the general's staff.

His pre-war contacts (including Rıza Tevfik Bölükbaşı) and ability to speak Turkish were to prove useful. He became famous for arranging a truce of eight hours, on Whit Monday, 24 May, with the Turkish commander Mustafa Kemal, for the purpose of burying the dead. This episode appears, with him as "the Honourable Herbert", in Louis de Bernières's novel. In Eastern Mediterranean Intelligence, he worked with Compton Mackenzie.

In October 1915, on sick leave in England, Herbert carried with him a memorandum, stating in part: "They [Foreign Office] trust Egypt with the running of the Arabian Question...", from the Cairo Intelligence Department from Colonel Clayton to the Foreign Office explaining the situation in the Middle East. In November, the memorandum, at first favourably received, became obsolete after the visit of François Georges-Picot and his subsequent negotiations with Mark Sykes. It would appear that the Arab Bureau continued working along the lines of the memorandum, which led to contrary promises ensuing accusations of bad faith.

In November 1915, Herbert was in Paris and Rome on a secret mission related to Albania. Following the plan to evacuate Anzac Cove beginning the following month, he volunteered to return to ANZAC to stay with the rear guard, convinced that his knowledge of language and his network of acquaintances would greatly benefit that body if captured. The 20 December successful evacuation of ANZAC and Suvla Bay and the good prospects for Cape Helles countered his proposal.

=== 1916 ===
Impatient with the Foreign Office indecision over Albania, at the start of 1916, Herbert went prospecting for new opportunities. Admiral Sir Rosslyn Wemyss proposed a job for him as a captain in intelligence. When in February the War Office cleared him from involvement in Albania, he took up the offer and found himself in charge of Naval intelligence in Mesopotamia (now Iraq) and the Gulf. Following the critical situation of British troops at Kut-al-Amara, the War Office was instructed to offer Herbert's services to General Townshend to negotiate terms with the Turks.

T. E. Lawrence was sent on behalf of the Arab Bureau while Colonel Beach acted for Indian Expeditionary Force Intelligence. Together they were to oversee the exchange of prisoners and wounded, and eventually to offer the commander Khalil Pasha up to £2 million for the relief of Kut. Enver Pasha rejected the offer, and the evacuation of the wounded was severely hampered through lack of transport. The situation at Kut led Aubrey to send a telegram to Austen Chamberlain, Secretary of State for India, with the support of General Lake but still in breach of army regulations, condemning incompetence in the handling of the Mesopotamian campaign. The Government of India ordered a court martial, but the War Office refused. Admiral Wemyss, who travelled to Simla for the purpose, supported him throughout.

Back in England in July 1916, Herbert started asking in the House of Commons for a Royal Commission to inquire into the conduct of the Mesopotamian campaign. He opposed the routine evasiveness of Prime Minister Asquith, (a close friend), by speaking in the House four times on Mesopotamia. His critics saw in his obstinacy a personal vendetta against Sir Beauchamp Duff, the commander-in-chief in India, and Sir William Meyer, the financial secretary, but his persistence paid off, and a Special Commission Mesopotamia was subsequently appointed.

In October 1916, Herbert started his post as a liaison officer with the Italian army, whose front line lay in Albania. He apparently was unaware of the clause partitioning Albania signed with Italy in the secret Treaty of London on 26 April 1915. When the Bolsheviks published its secret provisions in 1917, he rejected the idea of Albania as merely a small Muslim state, the fiefdom he believed of Essad Pasha. In December, he was back in England.

=== 1917–1918 ===
The year 1917 saw him working, under Military Intelligence Director George Macdonogh, on plans for a separate peace with Turkey. On 16 July, he conducted a series of meetings with the Turks in Geneva, Interlaken, and Bern, among them a (secret) representative of an influential anti-Enver group. Mustafa Kemal, whom Aubrey knew from Gallipoli, had fallen out with Enver Pasha over the way that – by the Sultan's personal order – his command over the Seventh Army opposite Allenby in Syria had been bestowed on him on 5 July (he had been a staff captain with the Fifth Army in Damascus in 1905).

Aubrey took his notes to the Inter-Allied Conference in Paris. In a memorandum to the Foreign Office, he said "If we get the luggage it does not matter very much if the Turks get the labels. When Lord Kitchener was all-powerful in Egypt his secretary was wearing a fez. Mesopotamia and Palestine are worth a fez."

In November 1917, Herbert was again sent to Italy under orders from General Macdonogh. Now he was in charge of the British Adriatic Mission, with Samuel Hoare coordinating the Mission's special intelligence in Rome. An earlier Pan-Albanian Federation of America (Vatra) proposal of raising an Albanian regiment under Aubrey's command had been renewed. The matter was a contentious one for the Italians, as Vatra became increasingly anti-Italian. On 17 July 1918, the proposal was formally approved in Boston, and the Italian Consulate accepted, provided it became a unit in the Italian Army. The end of the war prevented the issue from growing more complex. Herbert ended the war as head of the British mission to the Italian army in Albania with the rank of lieutenant colonel.

== Aftermath ==
Unclear policy led to nationalist criticism from imperial bases such as Egypt (see Saad Zaghloul, 1919) at the Paris Peace Conference, 1919, nor was the resulting political handling cause for much optimism to privileged witnesses such as Aubrey, T. E. Lawrence or Gertrude Bell. At the conference, there was a glimpse of further prospect for Aubrey Herbert when the Italian delegates proposed to assume shared responsibility over the Caucasus, an area of vital strategic importance – the Baku oilfields, access from the north to Mosul and Kirkuk. By May 1919, the proposal appeared to be quite empty.

By May 1919, the Intelligence Directorate had changed hands, on the authority of Lord Curzon (acting foreign secretary while Arthur Balfour was negotiating in Paris) from Aubrey's chief General George Macdonogh to Sir Basil Thomson of Scotland Yard Special Branch i.e. from military to civilian in view of the Bolshevik threat on the home front. Thus it was possible for Aubrey in February 1921 to amaze a friend he could confide to, Lord Robert Cecil, that he was going abroad as a Scotland Yard inspector: he went to Berlin to interview Talaat Pasha for intelligence.

== Villa in Portofino ==
Villa Altachiara or Villa Carnarvon, Portofino

Aubrey frequently visted his mother's Italian home Villa Altachiara in Portofino; built by his father in 1874, Alta Chiara was an Italian rendering of 'Highclere', the English seat of the Earls of Carnarvon. It had been a favoured retreat of Aubrey's elder brother the 5th Earl, but following their father's death it became the property of his step-mother Elsie Howard, who died there in 1929, having frequently entertained "eminent folks from the world of politics, religion (mainly Catholic, of course) and science". Aubrey declared: "if a man can have a second country, Italy is my second country". Whilst some sources suggest that Aubrey bequeathed the Villa to his wife Mary Vesey, Aubrey did not own the Villa as he predeceased his mother; she ultimately bequeathed Altachiara to Aubrey's eldest son Auberon Herbert. The house later became "a veritable literary colony for poets, painters and writers", including Aubrey's son-in-law Evelyn Waugh, Alfred Duggan, Peter Acton and Brooke Astor.

== Marriage and progeny ==
Arms of Viscount de Vesci of Abbeyleix, being a differenced version of his ancestral arms of Vesey: Or, on a cross sable a patriarchal cross of the field. Visible as an inescutcheon on the westernmost shield above Herbert's chest tomb in Brushford Church

Aubrey Herbert married his distant cousin, the Hon. Mary Gertrude Vesey (1889–1970), "striking looking with a ferocious temper", only child and sole heiress of John Vesey, 4th Viscount de Vesci (1844–1903), eldest son and heir of Thomas Vesey, 3rd Viscount de Vesci (d. 1875) by his wife Lady Emma Herbert (1819–1884) youngest daughter of George Herbert, 11th Earl of Pembroke. The 4th Viscount was a member of the Protestant Ascendancy in Ireland, but together with his wife had converted to Roman Catholicism and the couple raised their children in that faith. Herbert's mother-in-law (Lady Evelyn Charteris, eldest daughter of Francis Charteris, 10th Earl of Wemyss) gave the family a fine house in London. By his wife he had four children, one son and three daughters:

- Auberon Mark Henry Yvo Molyneux Herbert (25 April 1922 – 21 July 1974), only son and heir, who inherited his father's Pixton Park and Portofino properties. Died unmarried.
- Gabriel Mary Hermione Herbert (29 September 1911 – 15 November 1987), eldest daughter, who was one of two volunteer nurses serving with the Spanish Nationalists during the Spanish Civil War. She married Major Alexander Dru. Their grandson Alexander Dru married Lady Tatiana Mountbatten.
- (Anne) Bridget Domenica Herbert (22 February 1914 – 8 July 2005), who married (as his second wife) Major Allister Edward Grant (1892–1947), MC, "Eddie", of Nutcombe Manor, Clayhanger, Tiverton, Devon, a steeplechase rider who had twice broken his neck riding in the Grand National, later a publisher, son of Sir Charles Grant and grandson of Sir Robert Grant, MP. She was "the most down-to-earth by far of all the Herberts" and after her husband's early death devoted herself to farming.
- Laura Laetitia Gwendolen Evelyn Herbert (21 June 1916 – June 1973), who in 1937 married (as his second wife) the novelist Evelyn Waugh, whom she had met at Portofino, as a guest of her sister Gabriel. Waugh's first wife was Evelyn Gardner, a half first-cousin of Laura and Auberon, and a niece of the 5th Earl of Carnarvon. His marriage to Evelyn Gardner was annulled in 1936. The marriage to Laura was opposed by her brother Auberon. She was the mother of the journalist Auberon Waugh (1939–2001) (born at Pixton and named after his maternal grandmother's cousin) and the grandmother of Daisy Waugh and Alexander Waugh.

== Death and burial ==
Chest tomb and recumbent effigy of Hon. Aubrey Herbert in the Herbert Chapel, Brushford Church

During most of his life, he had poor eyesight and was almost blind by his early 40s. Toward the end of Herbert's life, he became totally blind. He received bad medical advice which persuaded him to have all his teeth extracted to help restore his sight. The dental operation resulted in blood poisoning from which he died in London on 26 September 1923. This was five months after the death of his elder half-brother, George Herbert, 5th Earl of Carnarvon, the Egyptologist who had discovered the Tomb of Tutankhamun. In 1924 Herbert's estate was valued for probate at £49,970 (equivalent to £2.63 million in 2025 pounds). His full-length recumbent effigy on a chest tomb with ceremonial sword above, survives in the Herbert Chapel in the Church of St Nicholas, Brushford, Somerset, near his seat at Pixton Park. Above it on decoratively sculpted wooden panelling are displayed six heraldic shields describing his ancestry and marriage.

== Model for literature ==
Herbert was, in part, the model for John Buchan's Sandy Arbuthnot.

The cameo character of the "'Honourable Herbert" in Louis de Bernières's novel Birds Without Wings is based on Herbert. He appears as a British liaison officer with the ANZAC troops serving in the Gallipoli campaign. A polyglot officer able to communicate with both sides, he arranges the burial of the dead of both sides, achieving great popularity with both sides – a description that mirrors his role in the 1915 truce.

== Books by Aubrey Herbert ==
- Eastern Songs. Edinburgh: William Blackwood & Sons. 1911.
- Mons, Anzac and Kut. London: Edward Arnold. 1919.
- MacCarthy, Desmond, ed. (1924). Ben Kendim: A Record of Eastern Travel. London: Hutchinson & Co.
- Destani, Bejtullah; Tomes, Jason, eds. (2011). Albania's Greatest Friend: Aubrey Herbert and the Making of Modern Albania: Diaries and Papers 1904–1923. London: I.B. Tauris.

== Bibliography ==
- Adam Smith, Janet (1985). John Buchan, A Biography. Oxford: Oxford University Press.
- Asquith, Herbert (1937). Moments of Memory - Recollections and Impressions. London: Hutchinson & Co.
- Bogosian, Eric (2015). Operation Nemesis. New York: Little, Brown. ISBN 9780316292108.
- Cannadine, David (1999). The Decline and Fall of the British Aristocracy. New York: Vintage. ISBN 978-0375703683.
- Clifford, Colin (2003). The Asquiths. London: John Murray. ISBN 9780719565250.
- FitzHerbert, Margaret (1983). The Man who was Greenmantle. A Biography of Aubrey Herbert. London: John Murray.
- Hansard 1803–2005: contributions in Parliament by Aubrey Herbert
- Herbert, Aubrey (2011). Destani, Bejtullah; Tomes, Jason (eds.). Albania's Greatest Friend: Aubrey Herbert and the Making of Modern Albania: Diaries and Papers 1904–1923. London: I.B. Tauris. ISBN 9781848854444.
- Herbert, Aubrey (1919). Mons, Anzac and Kut. London: Edward Arnold.
- Lownie, Andrew (2004). John Buchan, The Presbyterian Cavalier. Toronto: McArthur and Company. ISBN 9781552784099.
- Stannard, Martin (1993). Evelyn Waugh. Vol. 1, The Early Years 1903–1939. London: Flamingo.
- Sykes, Christopher (1977). Evelyn Waugh, A Biography. Harmondsworth: Penguin.
- Wallach, Janet (2005). Desert Queen: the extraordinary life of Gertrude Bell. New York: Anchor Books. ISBN 9781400096190.
- Wilson, A. N. (1984). Hilaire Belloc. London: Hamilton. ISBN 9780241111765.

Parliament of the United Kingdom
Preceded by Sir Edward Strachey	Member of Parliament for South Somerset; 1911–1918	Succeeded by Constituency abolished
New constituency	Member of Parliament for Yeovil; 1918–1923 by-election	Succeeded by George Davies
