= Marcus Fysh =

British politician

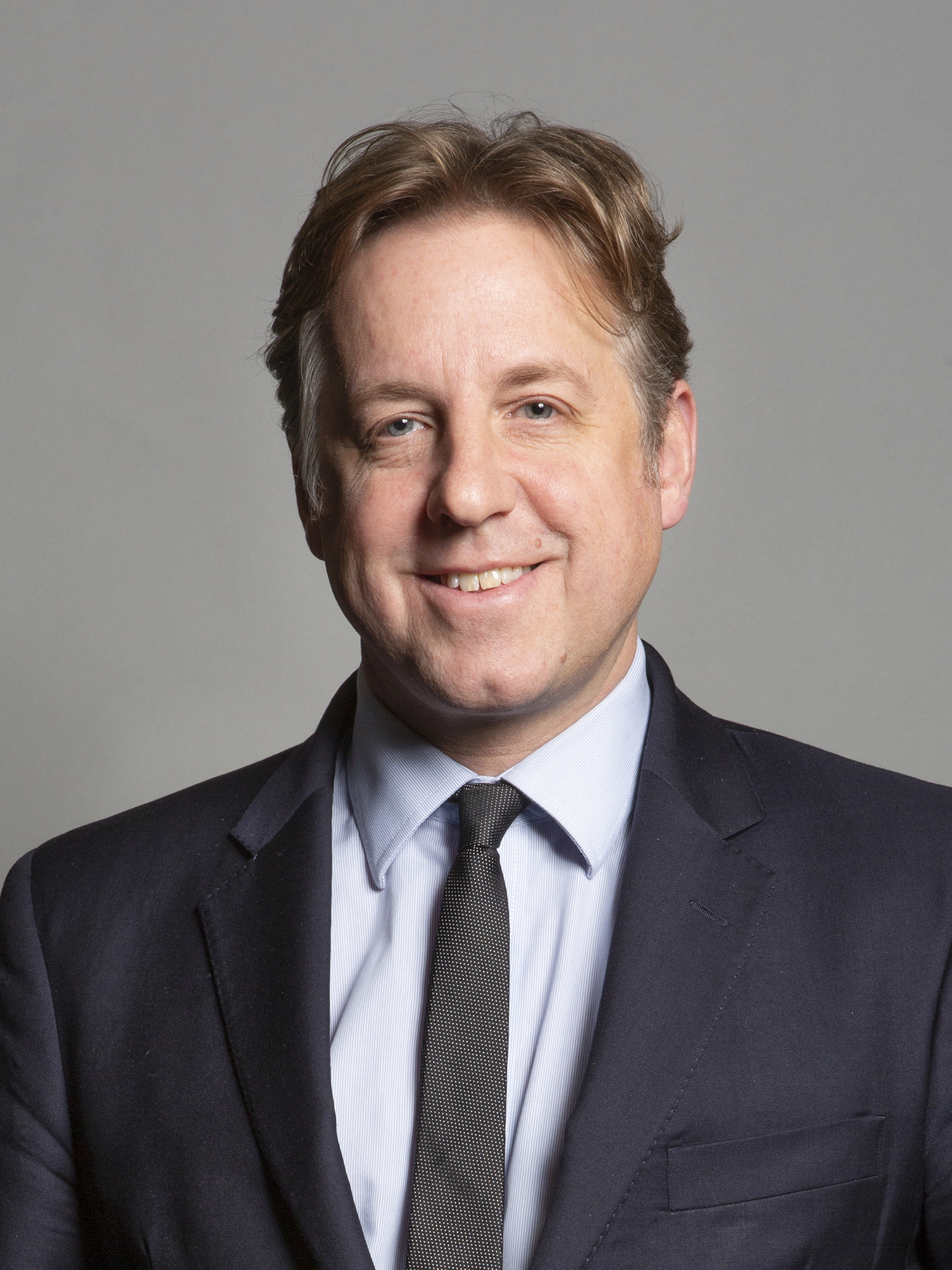
- Official portrait, 2019

Parliamentary Under-Secretary of State for Exports
- In office 20 September 2022 – 27 October 2022
- Prime Minister: Liz Truss
- Preceded by: Andrew Griffith
- Succeeded by: Andrew Bowie

Member of Parliament for Yeovil
- In office 7 May 2015 – 30 May 2024
- Preceded by: David Laws
- Succeeded by: Adam Dance

Personal details
- Born: Marcus John Hudson Fysh; 8 November 1970 (age 55) Australia
- Party: Independent
- Other political affiliations: Conservative (before 2024)
- Spouse: Jenny
- Children: 2
- Education: Winchester College, Hampshire (Independent boarding school)
- Alma mater: Corpus Christi College, Oxford

Marcus John Hudson Fysh (born 8 November 1970) is a British politician and former investment manager who was the Member of Parliament (MP) for Yeovil from 2015 until he lost the seat in 2024. He served as Parliamentary Under-Secretary of State for Exports from September 2022 until 27 October 2022.

Fysh was a supporter of Leave Means Leave, a pro-Brexit lobby group; he campaigned to leave the European Union (EU) in the 2016 referendum.

== Early life and career ==
Marcus Fysh was born on 8 November 1970 in Australia. His family moved to the UK when he was three, and he was educated at Winchester College, a boarding independent school for boys in Winchester, Hampshire. He went on to study English literature at Corpus Christi College, Oxford.

After graduation, he ran companies in the agriculture and healthcare sectors, as well as working for Mercury Asset Management specialising in investment in businesses in the Asia Pacific region.

Fysh was elected for the Conservative Party as a district councillor for South Somerset in 2011, representing Yeovil South ward, which he served on for one four-year term. In 2013, he was elected to represent the Coker ward of Somerset County Council; following his election as an MP he did not stand at the following local election in 2017.

== Parliamentary career ==
At the 2015 general election, Fysh was elected to Parliament as MP for Yeovil with 42.5% of the vote and a majority of 5,293.

Fysh has chaired the All Party Parliamentary Group on Education. He has been a member of All-party parliamentary groups for the Armed Forces, for Housing, for Education, for Social Care, for County Councils, and for Women Against State Pension Inequality.

Fysh was re-elected as MP for Yeovil at the snap 2017 general election with an increased vote share of 54.5% and an increased majority of 14,723.

In March 2019, Fysh was one of 21 MPs who voted against LGBT inclusive sex and relationship education in English schools, citing concerns about the teaching of gender fluidity confusing very young children.

At the 2019 general election, Fysh was again re-elected with an increased vote share of 58.4% and an increased majority of 16,181.

In June 2020, the Parliamentary Commissioner for Standards found that Fysh should have registered his unremunerated company directorships as interests. The Committee noted: "We do not believe that Mr Fysh has acted in bad faith. He exercised his right as a Member of the House to express disagreement with the Commissioner's interpretation of the rules and bring the matter before the Committee." It added that he should "make an apology on the floor of the House for both the non-registrations and non-declarations by means of a personal statement." Fysh was also told to apologise to the commissioner and registrar in writing. Fysh then issued the two apologies.

In October 2021 Fysh officially opened the construction site for upgrades to the A303, having campaigned on the issue for years.

Fysh was re-selected in April 2023 as the Conservative candidate for Yeovil at the 2024 general election.

In September 2023, Fysh was ordered to apologise to Parliament after being found to have broken the MPs' code of conduct; this related to statements he gave concerning an investigation by the Parliamentary Commissioner for Standards into the All Party Parliamentary Group for Education (which Fysh chaired) whilst the investigation was ongoing.

Fysh lost his seat to the Liberal Democrats in the 2024 general election, losing over 30% of the vote. On 6 July 2024, two days after the election, he announced that he had resigned from the Conservative Party - branding the party as "dead" and criticising the party's current Parliamentary makeup as "non-Conservative".

== Post-parliamentary career ==
Following his defeat at the 2024 election, Fysh was appointed as Director of Sarisa Ltd, a private investment platform supporting the development of energy storage and related technologies.

== Personal life ==
Fysh lives in London and at Naish Priory in the village of East Coker. In 2011, Fysh opposed plans by the local council to build additional houses in the area.

He is a regular contributor to The Telegraph as well as writing a weekly column in the Western Gazette.

Parliament of the United Kingdom
Preceded by David Laws	Member of Parliament for Yeovil; 2015–2024	Succeeded by Adam Dance
