= George Davies (politician) =

British politician (1875–1950)

George Frederick Davies

Major Sir George Frederick Davies, CVO (19 April 1875 – 21 June 1950) was a British Conservative Party politician. He served as the Member of Parliament (MP) for Yeovil from 1923 to 1945.

He was born in Honolulu in the Kingdom of Hawai'i, the son of Theophilus Harris Davies. He was educated at Uppingham School and then at King's College, Cambridge. During the First World War, he served in The Gloucestershire Regiment. He married in 1900, and had two sons and three daughters.

He was briefly British vice-consul in Honolulu. Whilst in parliament, he became an assistant government whip in 1931, served as a Lord Commissioner of the Treasury from 1932 to 1935, Vice-Chamberlain of the Household 1935–37 and Comptroller of the Household 1937–38. He was one of the earliest members of the 1922 Committee.

He was knighted in the 1936 King's Birthday Honours List. and appointed Commander of the Royal Victorian Order the next year.

Parliament of the United Kingdom
Preceded by Aubrey Herbert	Member of Parliament for Yeovil; 1923 by-election–1945	Succeeded by William Kingsmill
Political offices
Preceded by Sir Lambert Ward, Bt	Vice-Chamberlain of the Household; 1935–1937	Succeeded by Hon. Arthur Hope
Preceded by Sir Lambert Ward, Bt	Comptroller of the Household; 1937–1938	Succeeded by Charles Waterhouse
