= Yeovil (constituency) =

Parliamentary constituency in the United Kingdom, 1918 onwards

Coordinates: 50.9°N 2.81°W

- County constituency for the House of Commons
- Interactive map of boundaries since 2024
- Boundary of Yeovil in South West England
- Electorate: 76,056 (2023)
- Major settlements: Yeovil, Chard, Crewkerne, Ilminster

Current constituency
- Created: 1918
- Member of Parliament: Adam Dance (Liberal Democrats)
- Seats: One
- Created from: South Somerset and East Somerset (parts of)

Yeovil is a constituency (Note: A county constituency (for the purposes of election expenses and type of returning officer).) in Somerset created in 1918 and represented in the House of Commons of the Parliament of the United Kingdom. Since the 2024 General Election, the constituency has been represented by Liberal Democrat MP Adam Dance.

== Boundaries ==
=== Historic ===
1918–1974: The Municipal Boroughs of Yeovil and Chard, the Urban Districts of Crewkerne and Ilminster, the Rural Districts of Chard, Langport, Yeovil.

1974–1983: As 1918 but with redrawn boundaries.

1983–1997: The District of Yeovil wards of Blackdown, Chard North East, Chard North West, Chard Parish, Chard South East, Chard South West, Chinnock, Coker, Crewkerne Town, Dowlish, Egwood, Hazelbury, Houndstone, Ilminster Town, Lynches, Mudford, Neroche, St Michael's, South Petherton, Stoke, Windwhistle, Yeovil Central, Yeovil East, Yeovil North, Yeovil Preston, Yeovil South, Yeovil West.

The communities of Martock, Somerton and Ilchester were now included in the new seat of Somerton and Frome.

1997–2010: The District of South Somerset wards of Blackdown, Chard Avishayes, Chard Combe, Chard Crimchard, Chard Holyrood, Chard Jocelyn, Coker, Crewkerne, Egwood, Hamdon, Houndstone, Ilminster, Mudford, Neroche, Parrett, St Michael's, South Petherton, Tatworth and Forton, Windwhistle, Yeovil Central, Yeovil East, Yeovil Preston, Yeovil South, Yeovil West, Yeovil Without.

Map of boundaries from 2010 to 2024

2010–2024: The District of South Somerset wards of Blackdown, Brympton, Chard Avishayes, Chard Combe, Chard Crimchard, Chard Holyrood, Chard Jocelyn, Coker, Crewkerne, Egwood, Hamdon, Ilminster, Ivelchester, Neroche, Parrett, St Michael's, South Petherton, Tatworth and Forton, Windwhistle, Yeovil Central, Yeovil East, Yeovil South, Yeovil West, Yeovil Without.

=== Current ===
Further to the 2023 review of Westminster constituencies which came into effect for the 2024 general election, the constituency was defined as being composed of the following as they existed on 1 December 2020:

- The District of South Somerset wards of: Blackdown & Tatworth; Brympton; Chard Avishayes; Chard Combe; Chard Crimchard; Chard Holyrood; Chard Jocelyn; Coker; Crewkerne; Eggwood; Ilminster; Neroche; Parrett; South Petherton; Windwhistle; Yeovil College; Yeovil Lyde; Yeovil Summerlands; Yeovil Westland; Yeovil Without.

With effect from 1 April 2023, the District of South Somerset was abolished and absorbed into the new unitary authority of Somerset. Consequently, the constituency now comprises the following electoral divisions of Somerset from the 2024 general election:

- Brympton (most); Chard North; Chard South; Coker (most); Crewkerne; Ilminster; South Petherton and Islemoor (most); Yeovil Central; Yeovil East; Yeovil South; Yeovil West.

In order to bring the electorate within the permitted range, rural areas to the north of the town of Yeovil were transferred to the new constituency of Glastonbury and Somerton.

The seat covers the towns of Yeovil, Chard, Crewkerne and Ilminster in the county of Somerset.

== History ==
Results of all deposit-keeping candidates since 1983 in their bid be the MP for Yeovil (UK House of Commons).

From 1918 until 1983, Yeovil always returned a Conservative MP (though by only narrow margins over Labour in the 1940s and 1950s). There then followed a period of over 30 years during which the seat was represented by a member of the Liberal Party or their successors, the Liberal Democrats; firstly former leader Paddy Ashdown (1983–2001) and then former Chief Secretary to the Treasury David Laws (2001 to 2015). At the 2015 election, the seat returned to its former Conservative allegiance as Marcus Fysh defeated Laws by over 5,000 votes.

The South Somerset district voted 57% to leave the European Union, and academic analysis estimates that Yeovil itself voted 59% to leave. There was a swing of 7.7% away from the pro-Remain Liberal Democrats towards the pro-Leave Conservatives, which made the seat much safer in 2017, Marcus Fysh's majority increasing to just under 15,000. In 2019 the voters slightly increased this majority (to over 16,000).

In the 2024 General Election, the seat returned to the Liberal Democrats, with Adam Dance defeating the existing Conservative MP, Marcus Fysh, by over 12,000 votes.

== Members of Parliament ==
Election	Member	Party
1918	Aubrey Herbert	Conservative
1923 by-election	George Davies	Conservative
1945	William Kingsmill	Conservative
1951	John Peyton	Conservative
1983	Paddy Ashdown	Liberal
1988	Paddy Ashdown	Liberal Democrats
2001	David Laws	Liberal Democrats
2015	Marcus Fysh	Conservative
2024	Adam Dance	Liberal Democrats

== Elections ==
=== Elections in the 2020s ===
General election 2024: Yeovil
Party	Candidate	Votes	%	±%
Liberal Democrats	Adam Dance	23,765	48.5	▲17.4
Conservative	Marcus Fysh	11,497	23.5	▼34.7
Reform	Laura Bailhache	7,677	15.7	new
Labour	Rebecca Montacute	3,002	6.1	▼0.2
Green	Serena Wootton	2,403	4.9	▲2.1
Independent	Steve Ashton	608	1.2	new
Majority		12,286	25.2	
Turnout		48,952	61.4	▼9.8
Registered electors		79,918		
Liberal Democrats gain from Conservative		Swing	▲26.0	

=== Elections in the 2010s ===
2019 notional result
Party	Vote	%
Conservative	31,477	58.2
Liberal Democrats	16,839	31.1
Labour	3,419	6.3
Green	1,518	2.8
Others	875	1.6
Turnout	54,128	71.2
Electorate	76,056	

General election 2019: Yeovil
Party	Candidate	Votes	%	±%
Conservative	Marcus Fysh	34,588	58.4	+3.9
Liberal Democrats	Mick Clark	18,407	31.1	+1.4
Labour	Terence Ledlie	3,761	6.3	−6.2
Green	Diane Wood	1,629	2.7	+0.9
Independent	Tony Capozzoli	689	1.2	New
Constitution and Reform	Tom Fox	186	0.3	New
Majority		16,181	27.3	+2.5
Turnout		59,260	71.9	+0.3
Conservative hold		Swing	+1.3	

General election 2017: Yeovil
Party	Candidate	Votes	%	±%
Conservative	Marcus Fysh	32,369	54.5	+12.0
Liberal Democrats	Jo Roundell Greene	17,646	29.7	−3.4
Labour	Ian Martin	7,418	12.5	+5.4
Green	Robert Wood	1,052	1.8	−2.0
Independent	Katy Pritchard	919	1.5	New
Majority		14,723	24.8	+15.4
Turnout		59,404	71.6	+2.5
Conservative hold		Swing	+7.7	

General election 2015: Yeovil
Party	Candidate	Votes	%	±%
Conservative	Marcus Fysh	24,158	42.5	+9.6
Liberal Democrats	David Laws	18,885	33.2	−22.5
UKIP	Simon Smedley	7,646	13.4	+9.3
Labour	Sheena King	4,053	7.1	+1.9
Green	Emily McIvor	2,191	3.8	New
Majority		5,293	9.4	N/A
Turnout		56,933	69.1	−0.3
Conservative gain from Liberal Democrats		Swing	+16.1	

General election 2010: Yeovil
Party	Candidate	Votes	%	±%
Liberal Democrats	David Laws	31,843	55.7	+4.2
Conservative	Kevin Davis	18,807	32.9	−1.2
Labour	Lee Skevington	2,991	5.2	−5.3
UKIP	Nigel Pearson	2,357	4.1	+0.3
BNP	Robert Baehr	1,162	2.0	New
Majority		13,036	22.8	+5.6
Turnout		57,160	69.4	+5.6
Liberal Democrats hold		Swing	+2.7	

=== Elections in the 2000s ===
General election 2005: Yeovil
Party	Candidate	Votes	%	±%
Liberal Democrats	David Laws	25,658	51.4	+7.1
Conservative	Ian Jenkins	17,096	34.3	−1.8
Labour	Colin Rolfe	5,256	10.5	−4.2
UKIP	Graham Livings	1,903	3.8	+1.5
Majority		8,562	17.1	+8.9
Turnout		49,913	64.3	+0.1
Liberal Democrats hold		Swing	+4.5	

General election 2001: Yeovil
Party	Candidate	Votes	%	±%
Liberal Democrats	David Laws	21,266	44.3	−4.4
Conservative	Marco Forgione	17,338	36.1	+8.4
Labour	Joe Conway	7,077	14.7	−0.2
UKIP	Neil Boxall	1,131	2.3	New
Green	Alex Begg	786	1.6	+0.3
Liberal	Anthony Prior	534	1.1	New
Majority		3,928	8.2	−12.8
Turnout		48,132	64.2	−8.1
Liberal Democrats hold		Swing	−6.5	

=== Elections in the 1990s ===
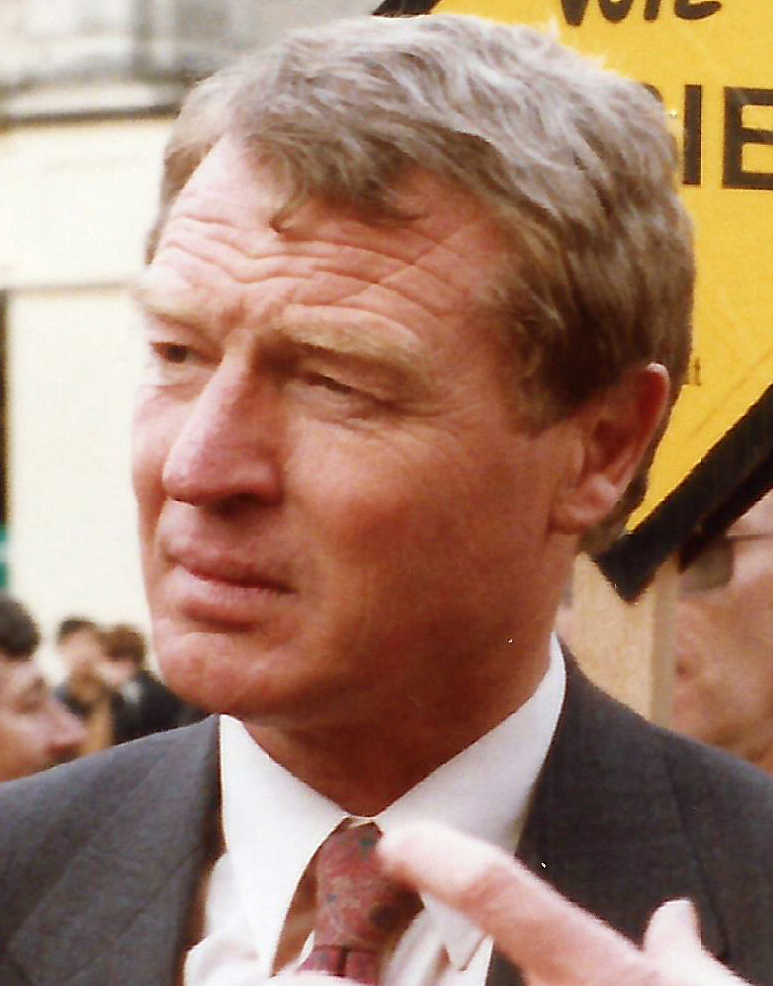
Paddy Ashdown

General election 1997: Yeovil
Party	Candidate	Votes	%	±%
Liberal Democrats	Paddy Ashdown	26,349	48.7	−2.9
Conservative	Nicholas Cambrook	14,946	27.7	−9.3
Labour	Patrick Conway	8,053	14.9	+5.3
Referendum	John Beveridge	3,574	6.6	New
Green	David Taylor	728	1.3	+0.2
Independent	John Archer	306	0.6	New
Rainbow Dream Ticket	Christopher Hudson	97	0.2	New
Majority		11,403	21.0	+6.3
Turnout		54,053	72.3	−9.7
Liberal Democrats hold		Swing	+3.2	

General election 1992: Yeovil
Party	Candidate	Votes	%	±%
Liberal Democrats	Paddy Ashdown	30,958	51.7	+0.3
Conservative	Julian Davidson	22,125	36.9	−4.4
Labour	Vivien Elson	5,765	9.6	+2.3
Green	Jay Risbridger	639	1.1	New
Monster Raving Loony	Screaming Lord Sutch	338	0.6	New
Anti-Paddy Ashdown Keep Britain Independent	Reginald Simmerson	70	0.1	New
Majority		8,833	14.8	+4.7
Turnout		59,895	82.0	+2.3
Liberal Democrats hold		Swing	+2.4	

=== Elections in the 1980s ===
General election 1987: Yeovil
Party	Candidate	Votes	%	±%
Liberal	Paddy Ashdown	28,841	51.4	+0.9
Conservative	George Sandeman	23,141	41.3	−2.7
Labour	John Fitzmaurice	4,099	7.3	+1.7
Majority		5,700	10.1	+3.6
Turnout		56,081	79.7	−0.1
Liberal hold		Swing	+2.4	

General election 1983: Yeovil
Party	Candidate	Votes	%	±%
Liberal	Paddy Ashdown	26,608	50.5	+20.0
Conservative	David Martin	23,202	44.0	−3.9
Labour	Peter Brushett	2,928	5.6	−16.0
Majority		3,406	6.5	N/A
Turnout		52,738	79.8	−2.3
Liberal gain from Conservative		Swing	+12.0	

=== Elections in the 1970s ===
General election 1979: Yeovil
Party	Candidate	Votes	%	±%
Conservative	John Peyton	31,321	47.9	+4.9
Liberal	Paddy Ashdown	19,939	30.5	+1.5
Labour	Ian Luder	14,098	21.6	−7.4
Majority		11,382	17.4	+3.4
Turnout		65,358	82.1	+2.8
Conservative hold		Swing	+3.2	

General election October 1974: Yeovil
Party	Candidate	Votes	%	±%
Conservative	John Peyton	25,658	43.0	+1.47
Labour	M. T. McVicar	17,330	29.0	+1.22
Liberal	Geoffrey F. Taylor	17,298	29.0	−0.04
Independent	J. E. Tippett	332	0.5	New
Majority		7,379	14.0	+2.02
Turnout		60,618	79.3	−4.56
Conservative hold		Swing	+0.12	

General election February 1974: Yeovil
Party	Candidate	Votes	%	±%
Conservative	John Peyton	25,955	41.53	−8.16
Liberal	Geoffrey F. Taylor	18,465	29.54	+16.23
Labour	M.T. McVicar	17,362	27.78	−9.22
Democratic Conservative	J.E. Tippett	720	1.15	New
Majority		7,490	11.99	−0.70
Turnout		62,542	83.86	+4.52
Conservative hold		Swing	-12.2	

General election 1970: Yeovil
Party	Candidate	Votes	%	±%
Conservative	John Peyton	27,689	49.69	+6.52
Labour	John A Elswood	20,621	37.00	−2.21
Liberal	David E Evans	7,418	13.31	−4.31
Majority		7,068	12.69	+8.73
Turnout		55,728	79.34	−4.24
Conservative hold		Swing	+4.36	

=== Elections in the 1960s ===
General election 1966: Yeovil
Party	Candidate	Votes	%	±%
Conservative	John Peyton	22,664	43.17	+0.62
Labour	John A Elswood	20,584	39.21	+5.88
Liberal	David E Evans	9,248	17.62	−6.50
Majority		2,080	3.96	−5.26
Turnout		52,496	83.63	+0.32
Conservative hold		Swing	+3.25	

General election 1964: Yeovil
Party	Candidate	Votes	%	±%
Conservative	John Peyton	21,919	42.55	−4.16
Labour	Albert C Reed	17,171	33.33	−1.33
Liberal	Geoffrey F. Taylor	12,426	24.12	+6.48
Majority		4,748	9.22	−2.83
Turnout		51,516	83.31	−1.88
Conservative hold		Swing	-2.75	

=== Elections in the 1950s ===
General election 1959: Yeovil
Party	Candidate	Votes	%	±%
Conservative	John Peyton	23,771	46.71	−1.5
Labour	W. Alex Baker	17,638	34.66	−5.0
Liberal	Geoffrey Fawsitt Taylor	9,484	18.64	+6.4
Majority		6,133	12.05	+3.5
Turnout		50,893	85.19	+0.1
Conservative hold		Swing	+3.3	

General election 1955: Yeovil
Party	Candidate	Votes	%	±%
Conservative	John Peyton	24,059	48.17	+1.33
Labour	Moss Murray	19,793	39.63	−0.43
Liberal	Geoffrey Fawsitt Taylor	6,089	12.19	+0.10
Majority		4,266	8.54	+2.77
Turnout		49,941	85.06	−2.9
Conservative hold		Swing	+0.88	

General election 1951: Yeovil
Party	Candidate	Votes	%	±%
Conservative	John Peyton	23,701	46.84	+4.27
Labour	Moss Murray	20,780	41.07	+1.74
Liberal	Marguerite L Winsor	6,118	12.09	−6.01
Majority		2,921	5.77	+2.53
Turnout		50,599	87.96	+0.5
Conservative hold		Swing	+3.0	

General election 1950: Yeovil
Party	Candidate	Votes	%	±%
Conservative	William Kingsmill	21,145	42.57	+4.81
Labour	Maurice Shinwell	19,532	39.33	+1.95
Liberal	Leon MacLaren	8,990	18.10	−6.74
Majority		1,613	3.24	+2.84
Turnout		49,867	87.46	+12.20
Conservative hold		Swing	+3.38	

=== Election in the 1940s ===
General election 1945: Yeovil
Party	Candidate	Votes	%	±%
Conservative	William Kingsmill	16,815	37.78	−9.02
Labour	Malcolm MacPherson	16,641	37.38	+17.28
Liberal	James Douglas Bateman	11,057	24.84	−8.26
Majority		174	0.40	−13.30
Turnout		44,513	75.26	−3.04
Conservative hold		Swing	-13.15	

Another general election was required to take place before the end of 1940. The political parties had been making preparations for an election to take place and by the Autumn of 1939, the following candidates had been selected;

- Conservative: John Fox-Strangways
- Liberal: James Bateman
- Labour: Malcolm MacPherson

=== Elections in the 1930s ===
General election 1935: Yeovil
Party	Candidate	Votes	%	±%
Conservative	George Davies	17,640	46.8	−4.1
Liberal	James Douglas Bateman	12,482	33.1	−2.4
Labour	Albert Edward Millett	7,567	20.1	+6.5
Majority		5,158	13.7	−1.7
Turnout		37,689	78.3	−5.8
Conservative hold		Swing	-0.9	

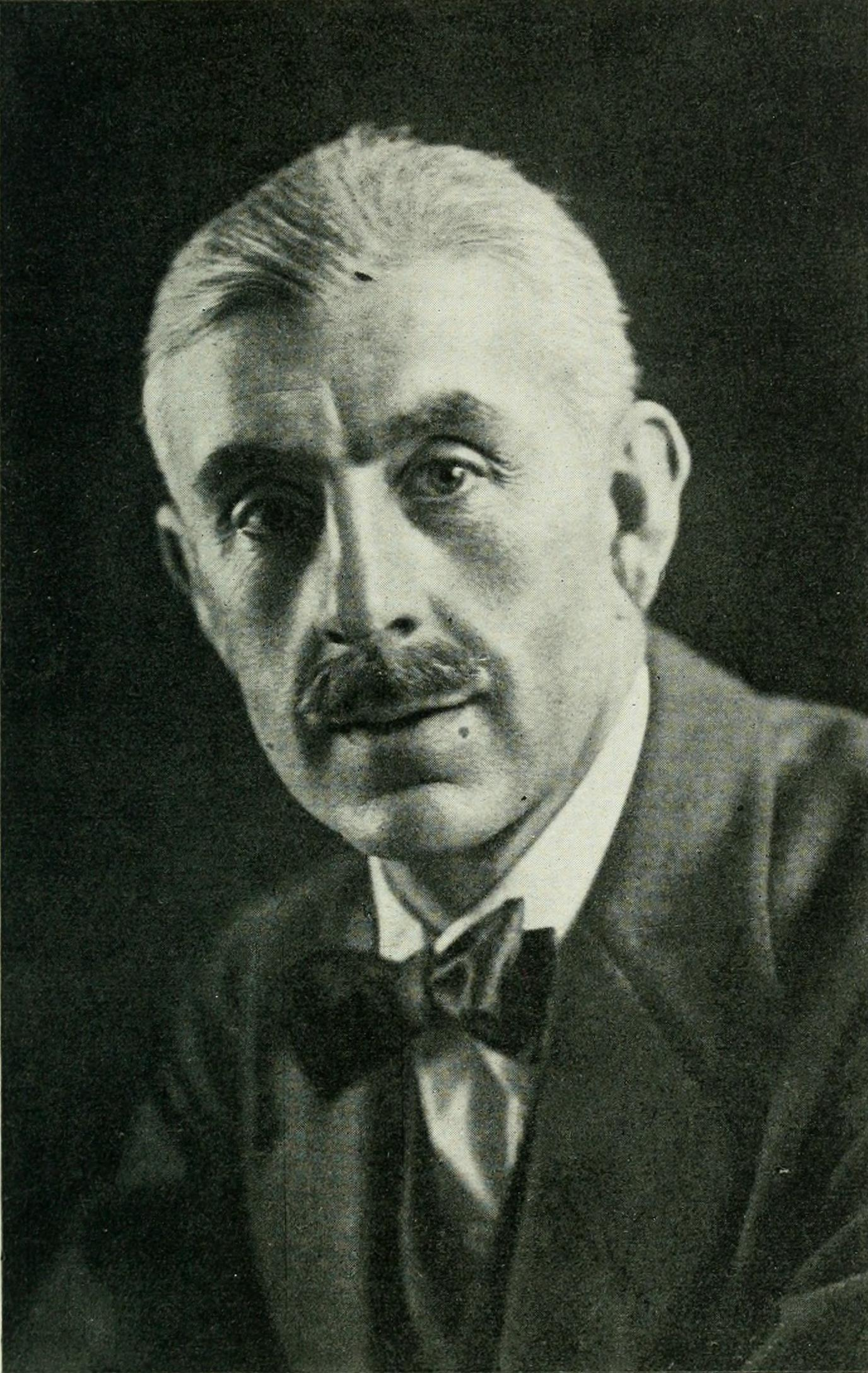
Hamilton Fyfe

General election 1931: Yeovil
Party	Candidate	Votes	%	±%
Conservative	George Davies	20,165	50.9	+9.8
Liberal	Percy Holt Heffer	14,046	35.5	−3.3
Labour	Hamilton Fyfe	5,377	13.6	−6.5
Majority		6,119	15.4	+13.1
Turnout		39,588	84.1	+0.7
Conservative hold		Swing	+6.6	

=== Elections in the 1920s ===
General election 1929: Yeovil
Party	Candidate	Votes	%	±%
Unionist	George Davies	15,526	41.1	−7.2
Liberal	Percy Holt Heffer	14,679	38.8	+7.7
Labour	Francis Douglas	7,609	20.1	−0.5
Majority		847	2.3	−14.9
Turnout		37,814	83.4	−0.2
Unionist hold		Swing	-7.5	

General election 1924: Yeovil
Party	Candidate	Votes	%	±%
Unionist	George Davies	14,477	48.3	+3.8
Liberal	Charles Waley Cohen	9,320	31.1	−6.5
Labour	James Lievsley George	6,179	20.6	+2.8
Majority		5,157	17.2	+10.2
Turnout		29,976	83.6	
Unionist hold		Swing	+5.1	

1923 general election: Yeovil
Party	Candidate	Votes	%	±%
Unionist	George Davies	12,690	44.5	−17.3
Liberal	Charles Waley Cohen	10,715	37.6	N/A
Labour	William Kelly	5,080	17.8	−20.5
Majority		1,975	6.9	−16.6
Turnout		28,485		
Unionist hold		Swing	-7.5	

1923 Yeovil by-election
Party	Candidate	Votes	%	±%
Unionist	George Davies	13,205	46.6	−15.2
Labour	William Kelly	8,140	28.7	−9.6
Liberal	Charles Waley Cohen	7,024	24.8	New
Majority		5,065	17.9	−5.6
Turnout		28,369	80.8	+7.8
Unionist hold		Swing	-2.8	

1922 general election: Yeovil
Party	Candidate	Votes	%	±%
Unionist	Aubrey Herbert	15,468	61.8	+11.3
Labour	William Kelly	9,581	38.3	+1.9
Majority		5,887	23.5	+9.4
Turnout		25,049	73.0	+11.2
Unionist hold		Swing	+4.7	

=== Elections in the 1910s ===
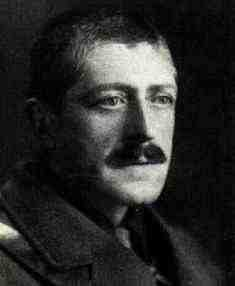
Aubrey Herbert

General election 14 December 1918: Yeovil
Party		Candidate	Votes	%	±%
C	Unionist	Aubrey Herbert	10,522	50.5	
	Labour	William Kelly	7,589	36.4	
	Liberal	J. R. Brough	2,743	13.2	
Majority			2,933	14.1	
Turnout			20,854	61.8	
	Unionist win (new seat)				
C indicates candidate endorsed by the coalition government.

== See also ==
- Parliamentary constituencies in Somerset
