= 2015 South Somerset District Council election =

2015 UK local government election

Map of the results of the 2015 South Somerset District Council election. Conservatives in blue, Liberal Democrats in yellow and independents in grey.

The 2015 South Somerset District Council election took place on 7 May 2015 to elect members of South Somerset District Council in Somerset, England. This was on the same day as the general election, and other local elections. This election saw 29 Liberal Democrats, 28 Conservatives, and 3 Independents elected to the Council.

The Liberal Democrats had control of the council since 1987 and won the previous election in 2011 with a 2-seat majority.

== Ward results ==
South Somerset District Council continued to be made up of 60 councillors elected across 39 wards. The Conservative Party and the Liberal Democrats both fielded 58 candidates, Labour fielded 31 candidates, the Green Party 11, the UK Independence Party 8 and there were 5 independents.

Incumbent candidates are denoted *.

=== Blackdown Ward ===
Seats contested: 1

Blackdown Ward
Party	Candidate	Votes	%	±%
Conservative	Martin John Wale	923	59	
Liberal Democrats	Nigel John Petrie Mermagen	388	25	
UKIP	Neil Arnold	246	16	
Turnout		1,557		
Conservative hold		Swing		

=== Blackmoor Vale Ward ===
Seats contested: 2

Blackmoor Vale Ward
Party	Candidate	Votes	%	±%
Conservative	William Wallace*	1,738	32	
Conservative	Tim Inglefield*	1,477	27	
Liberal Democrats	Sue Place	1,245	23	
Liberal Democrats	Jack Dyke-Bracher	756	14	
Labour	Joanna Susan Penberthy	275	5	
Turnout		5,491		
Conservative hold		Swing		
Conservative hold		Swing		

=== Bruton Ward ===
Seats contested: 1

Bruton Ward
Party	Candidate	Votes	%	±%
Conservative	Anna Mary Groskop*	843	56	
Liberal Democrats	Abi Baker	310	20	
Green	Ewan Jones	246	16	
Labour	Matthew Hooberman	114	8	
Turnout		1,513		
Conservative hold		Swing		

=== Brympton Ward ===
Seats contested: 2

Brympton Ward
Party	Candidate	Votes	%	±%
Conservative	Sarah Helena Lindsay	1,426	25	
Liberal Democrats	Peter Jeremy Seib*	1,421	25	
Liberal Democrats	Emma Louise Dunn	1,257	22	
Conservative	Josh Williams	1,202	21	
Labour	Glen James Graham	459	8	
Turnout		5,765		
Liberal Democrats hold		Swing		
Conservative gain from Liberal Democrats		Swing		

=== Burrow Hill Ward ===
Seats contested: 1

Burrow Hill Ward
Party	Candidate	Votes	%	±%
Conservative	Derek Yeomans*	878	62	
Liberal Democrats	Pippa Mestraud	399	28	
Labour	Sam Foulder-Hughes	148	10	
Turnout		1,425		
Conservative hold		Swing		

=== Camelot Ward ===
Seats contested: 1

Camelot Ward
Party	Candidate	Votes	%	±%
Conservative	Mike Lewis*	1,121	68	
Liberal Democrats	Penny Ashton	251	15	
UKIP	Christopher Hill	181	11	
Labour	Ann Margaret Reeder	106	6	
Turnout		1,121		
Conservative hold		Swing		

=== Cary Ward ===
Seats contested: 2

Cary Ward
Party	Candidate	Votes	%	±%
Conservative	Nick Weeks*	1,627	27	
Liberal Democrats	Henry Hobhouse*	1,432	24	
Conservative	Barry Moorhouse	1,298	22	
Liberal Democrats	Richard John Arnold	971	16	
Green	Richard Tabor	482	8	
Labour	Megan Sarah Rose Summerville	207	3	
Turnout		6,017		
Conservative hold		Swing		
Liberal Democrats hold		Swing		

=== Chard Avishayes Ward ===
Seats contested: 1

Chard Avishayes Ward
Party	Candidate	Votes	%	±%
Liberal Democrats	Garry Frederick Shortland	440	36	
Conservative	Peter Amey	402	33	
Independent	Cath Morrison	223	18	
Labour	Graham Forsyth	148	12	
Turnout		1,213		
Liberal Democrats hold		Swing		

=== Chard Combe Ward ===
Seats contested: 1

Chard Combe Ward
Party	Candidate	Votes	%	±%
Conservative	Amanda Jane Broom	514	46	
Liberal Democrats	Steve Warwick	450	40	
Green	Jon Lewes	148	13	
Turnout		1,112		
Conservative hold		Swing		

=== Chard Crimchard Ward ===
Seats contested: 1

Chard Crimchard Ward
Party	Candidate	Votes	%	±%
Liberal Democrats	Jenny Kenton*	863	66	
Conservative	Paul Bradly	445	34	
Turnout		1,308		
Liberal Democrats hold		Swing		

=== Chard Holyrood Ward ===
Seats contested: 1

}

Chard Holyrood Ward
Party	Candidate	Votes	%	±%
Liberal Democrats	Jason Paul Baker	699	51	
Conservative	Brennie Halse*	670	49	
Turnout		1,369		
Liberal Democrats gain from Conservative		Swing		

=== Chard Jocelyn Ward ===
Seats contested: 1

Chard Jocelyn Ward
Party	Candidate	Votes	%	±%
Independent	Dave Bulmer*	596	50	
Conservative	Irene Glynn	360	30	
Liberal Democrats	Melanie Ann Cherry Hudson	237	20	
Turnout		1,193		
Independent hold		Swing		

=== Coker Ward ===
Seats contested: 2

Coker Ward
Party	Candidate	Votes	%	±%
Conservative	Gina Seaton*	1,755	29	
Liberal Democrats	Cathy Bakewell*	1,529	26	
Conservative	Rod Jones	1,464	25	
Liberal Democrats	Mick Clark	1,216	20	
Turnout		5,964		
Conservative hold		Swing		
Liberal Democrats hold		Swing		

=== Crewkerne Ward ===
Seats contested: 3

Crewkerne Ward
Party	Candidate	Votes	%	±%
Liberal Democrats	Mike Best*	2,050	17	
Conservative	Marcus Morton Barrett	1,827	15	
Liberal Democrats	Angie Singleton*	1,555	13	
Liberal Democrats	Robin Christopher Pailthorpe	1,498	12	
Conservative	Adam Keen	1,369	11	
Conservative	Andrew John Newman Simkins	1,286	10	
Labour	Martin John Bailey	797	6	
Green	Katy Limmer	696	6	
Green	Ben Keiron Hartshorn	672	5	
Green	Nathan Harmer-Taylor	626	5	
Turnout		12,376		
Liberal Democrats hold		Swing		
Liberal Democrats hold		Swing		
Conservative gain from Liberal Democrats		Swing		

=== Curry Rivel Ward ===
Seats contested: 1

Curry Rivel Ward
Party	Candidate	Votes	%	±%
Conservative	Tiffany Ann Martha Osborne	826	52	
Independent	Terry Mounter*	601	38	
Labour	Alan John Martin	148	9	
Turnout		1,575		
Conservative gain from Independent		Swing		

=== Eggwood Ward ===
Seats contested: 1

Eggwood Ward
Party	Candidate	Votes	%	±%
Liberal Democrats	Paul Michael Maxwell*	787	53	
Conservative	Jonathan Edward Edgington	687	47	
Turnout		1,474		
Liberal Democrats hold		Swing		

=== Hamdon Ward ===
Seats contested: 1

Hamdon Ward
Party	Candidate	Votes	%	±%
Liberal Democrats	Sylvia Seal*	905	57	
Conservative	Christopher Edward Price	681	43	
Turnout		1,586		
Liberal Democrats hold		Swing		

=== Ilminster Ward ===
Seats contested: 2

Ilminster Ward
Party	Candidate	Votes	%	±%
Liberal Democrats	Carol Ann Goodall*	1,253	21	
Liberal Democrats	Val Keitch	1,108	19	
Conservative	Sean Clarke	1,037	18	
Conservative	Stuart Richard Shepherd	1,011	17	
UKIP	Don Kinder	689	12	
Green	Henry Peter Lansdown	460	8	
Labour	Paul John Sellers	306	5	
Turnout		5,864		
Liberal Democrats hold		Swing		
Liberal Democrats hold		Swing		

=== Islemoor Ward ===
Seats contested: 1

Islemoor Ward
Party	Candidate	Votes	%	±%
Conservative	Sue Steele*	1,129	66	
Liberal Democrats	Oliver Pearce	417	25	
Labour	Geoff Mchugh	155	9	
Turnout		1,701		
Conservative hold		Swing		

=== Ivelchester Ward ===
Seats contested: 1

Ivelchester Ward
Party	Candidate	Votes	%	±%
Independent	Tony Capozzoli*	922	53	
Conservative	Richard Foley Dale	600	35	
Liberal Democrats	Theo Whitaker	206	12	
Turnout		1,728		
Independent hold		Swing		

=== Langport and Huish Ward ===
Seats contested: 1

Langport and Huish Ward
Party	Candidate	Votes	%	±%
Conservative	Clare Aparicio Paul	1,652	41	
Liberal Democrats	Julia Mary Frances Gadd	473	29	
Green	Cara Ann Naden	295	18	
Labour	Sean Adam Dromgoole	199	12	
Turnout		1,652		
Conservative gain from Liberal Democrats		Swing		

=== Martock Ward ===
Seats contested: 2

Martock Ward
Party	Candidate	Votes	%	±%
Conservative	Neil Brian Bloomfield	1,610	29	
Conservative	Graham Harold Middleton*	1,513	27	
Liberal Democrats	Patrick John Palmer*	1,126	20	
Liberal Democrats	Ben Ingram	809	15	
Labour	Chris Bragg	469	8	
Turnout		5,527		
Conservative hold		Swing		
Conservative gain from Liberal Democrats		Swing		

=== Milborne Port Ward ===
Seats contested: 1

Milborne Port Ward
Party	Candidate	Votes	%	±%
Liberal Democrats	Sarah Joanne Dyke-Bracher	766	45	
Conservative	Lucy Wallace*	765	45	
Labour	David Harry Lowe	184	11	
Turnout		1,715		
Liberal Democrats gain from Conservative		Swing		

=== Neroche Ward ===
Seats contested: 1

Neroche Ward
Party	Candidate	Votes	%	±%
Conservative	Linda Patricia Vijeh*	893	57	
Liberal Democrats	Jo Dawson	371	24	
UKIP	Clive Mark Rust	313	20	
Turnout		1,577		
Conservative hold		Swing		

=== Northstone Ward ===
Seats contested: 1

Northstone Ward
Party	Candidate	Votes	%	±%
Conservative	David John Norris	1,200	62	
Liberal Democrats	Grahame Sydney Baker	527	27	
Labour	Keith Laurence O'Boyle	200	10	
Turnout		1,927		
Conservative hold		Swing		

=== Parrett Ward ===
Seats contested: 1

Parrett Ward
Party	Candidate	Votes	%	±%
Liberal Democrats	Ric Pallister*	785	52	
Conservative	Mark Alexander Keating	728	48	
Turnout		1,513		
Liberal Democrats hold		Swing		

=== South Petherton Ward ===
Seats contested: 2

South Petherton Ward
Party	Candidate	Votes	%	±%
Liberal Democrats	Adam James Dance	1,688	37	
Liberal Democrats	Crispin Kenneth Raikes	1,564	34	
Conservative	Barry Walker*	1,347	29	
Turnout		4,599		
Liberal Democrats gain from Conservative		Swing		
Liberal Democrats gain from Conservative		Swing		

=== St. Michael's Ward ===
Seats contested: 1

St. Michael's Ward
Party	Candidate	Votes	%	±%
Liberal Democrats	Jo Roundell-Greene*	699	52	
Conservative	Alexander Priest	653	48	
Turnout		1,352		
Liberal Democrats hold		Swing		

=== Tatworth and Forton Ward ===
Seats contested: 1

Tatworth and Forton Ward
Party	Candidate	Votes	%	±%
Independent	Andrew Turpin*	608	38	
Conservative	Russ Wardell	552	35	
Liberal Democrats	Robin Munday	435	27	
Turnout		1,595		
Independent hold		Swing		

=== Tower Ward ===
Seats contested: 1

Tower Ward
Party	Candidate	Votes	%	±%
Conservative	Mike Beech*	947	62	
Green	Oliver Hugh Arnold Dowding	274	18	
Liberal Democrats	Dave Nye	241	16	
Labour	Adrian Carter	73	5	
Turnout		1,535		
Conservative hold		Swing		

=== Turn Hill Ward ===
Seats contested: 1

Turn Hill Ward
Party	Candidate	Votes	%	±%
Conservative	Shane Pledger*	1,071	58	
Liberal Democrats	Pamela Diane Jukes	635	34	
Labour	Alan Peter Rose	142	8	
Turnout		1,848		
Conservative hold		Swing		

=== Wessex Ward ===
Seats contested: 2

Wessex Ward
Party	Candidate	Votes	%	±%
Conservative	Dean Ruddle	2,114	52	
Liberal Democrats	Stephen Richard John Page	1,326	33	
Labour	Frankie Ashton	589	15	
Turnout		4,029		
Conservative hold		Swing		
Liberal Democrats hold		Swing		

=== Wincanton Ward ===
Seats contested: 2

Wincanton Ward
Party	Candidate	Votes	%	±%
Conservative	Colin Winder*	1,235	25	
Conservative	Nick Colbert*	1,231	25	
Liberal Democrats	Tim Carroll	821	17	
UKIP	Mark Anthony Vallance	531	11	
Liberal Democrats	Sarah Elizabeth Denton	512	11	
Green	John Frederick Holman	307	6	
Labour	Tim Daniel	223	5	
Turnout		4,860		
Conservative hold		Swing		
Conservative hold		Swing		

=== Windwhistle Ward ===
Seats contested: 1

Windwhistle Ward
Party	Candidate	Votes	%	±%
Conservative	Sue Osborne*	818	55	
Liberal Democrats	John Dyke	469	32	
UKIP	George Bernard Munro Elliott	196	13	
Turnout		1,483		
Conservative hold		Swing		

=== Yeovil Central Ward ===
Seats contested: 3

Yeovil Central Ward
Party	Candidate	Votes	%	±%
Liberal Democrats	Peter Arnold Gubbins*	1,329	17	
Liberal Democrats	Andy Kendall*	1,308	17	
Liberal Democrats	Kaysar Mahmud Hussain	1,132	15	
Conservative	David John Byrne	1,013	13	
Conservative	Linda Jane Gage	872	11	
Conservative	Bridget Mary Philomena Spender	777	10	
Labour	Mark Gordon Lambden	626	8	
Labour	Terry Lavin	581	8	
Turnout		7,638		
Liberal Democrats hold		Swing		
Liberal Democrats hold		Swing		
Liberal Democrats hold		Swing		

=== Yeovil East Ward ===
Seats contested: 3

Yeovil East Ward
Party	Candidate	Votes	%	±%
Liberal Democrats	Tony Lock*	1,349	19	
Liberal Democrats	David Charles Recardo*	1,097	16	
Liberal Democrats	Rob Stickland	981	14	
UKIP	Godfrey Davey	706	10	
Conservative	Nick Rousell	571	8	
Conservative	Ann Needle	538	8	
Labour	Bill Byrd	534	8	
Conservative	Morley Keith Waddleton	528	7	
Labour	Sharon Anne Stafford	442	6	
Labour	Murray William Shepstone	330	5	
Turnout		7,076		
Liberal Democrats hold		Swing		
Liberal Democrats hold		Swing		
Liberal Democrats hold		Swing		

=== Yeovil South Ward ===
Seats contested: 3

Yeovil South Ward
Party	Candidate	Votes	%	±%
Conservative	John Charles Marshall Field	2,036	17	
Conservative	Nigel James Gage*	2,008	16	
Conservative	Sam McAllister	1,776	15	
Liberal Democrats	Kris Castle	1,691	14	
Liberal Democrats	Nagaraja Akkisetty	1,376	11	
Liberal Democrats	Gordon Dugald Thomson Czapiewski	1,227	10	
Labour	Joe Conway	866	7	
Labour	Terry Ledlie	622	5	
Labour	Martin Ronald Bailey	615	5	
Turnout		12,217		
Conservative hold		Swing		
Conservative hold		Swing		
Conservative gain from Liberal Democrats		Swing		

=== Yeovil West Ward ===
Seats contested: 3

Yeovil West Ward
Party	Candidate	Votes	%	±%
Liberal Democrats	John Ernle Clark	1,364	16	
Liberal Democrats	Wes Read*	1,347	16	
Liberal Democrats	Alan Barry Smith	1,072	13	
Conservative	Mick Beales	1,049	13	
Conservative	Ash Strelling	954	11	
Conservative	David Keith Tolley	851	10	
UKIP	Tony Turner	844	10	
Labour	Dan Marks	462	6	
Labour	Colin John Rose	431	5	
Turnout		8,374		
Liberal Democrats hold		Swing		
Liberal Democrats hold		Swing		
Liberal Democrats hold		Swing		

=== Yeovil Without Ward ===
Seats contested: 3

Yeovil Without Ward
Party	Candidate	Votes	%	±%
Liberal Democrats	Mike Lock	1,655	16	
Conservative	Gye Charles Bower Dibben	1,610	15	
Liberal Democrats	Graham John Oakes*	1,603	15	
Conservative	Teresa Anne Bond	1,588	15	
Liberal Democrats	Pauline Annette Lock	1,476	14	
Conservative	Teresa Sienkiewicz	1,187	11	
Green	Gary Young	747	7	
Labour	Sue Pitman	661	6	
Turnout		10,527		
Liberal Democrats hold		Swing		
Liberal Democrats hold		Swing		
Conservative gain from Liberal Democrats		Swing		
