= South Somerset (constituency) =

Former parliamentary constituency in the United Kingdom

- Former county constituency for the House of Commons

1885–1918
- Seats: one
- Created from: East Somerset and West Somerset
- Replaced by: Yeovil

South Somerset was a single-member (MP) county constituency in Somerset for the House of Commons of the Parliament of the United Kingdom. As all single-member seats, its elections were by first past the post voting.

It was created under the Redistribution of Seats Act 1885 for the general election that year. The Act changed the county's representation to seven county and four borough seats, and abolished for the 1918 general election.

It's elections returned one Liberal, then another, covering its first 26 years; then returned a Conservative for its final seven years.

== Boundaries ==
First form. Extract from 1906 result: this seat is the central zone (with the Tory blue West Dorset seat, south)

The Municipal Borough of Yeovil, the Sessional Divisions of Crewkerne and Yeovil, and part of the Sessional Division of Ilminster.

== Members of Parliament ==
Election	Member	Party
1885	Frederick Lambart, later 9th Earl of Cavan	Liberal
1892	Edward Strachey, later ennobled	Liberal
1911 by-election	Aubrey Herbert	Conservative
1918	constituency abolished	

== Elections ==
=== Elections in the 1880s ===
General election 1885: South Somerset
Party	Candidate	Votes	%	±%
Liberal	Frederick Lambart	4,534	58.1	
Conservative	John Wingfield-Digby	3,268	41.9	
Majority		1,266	16.2	
Turnout		7,802	83.5	
Registered electors		9,349		
Liberal win (new seat)				

Lambart was appointed Vice-Chamberlain of the Household, requiring a by-election.

By-election, 24 Feb 1886: South Somerset
Party	Candidate	Votes	%	±%
Liberal	Frederick Lambart	Unopposed		
Liberal hold				

General election 1886: South Somerset
Party	Candidate	Votes	%	±%
Liberal	Frederick Lambart	3,739	51.6	−6.5
Conservative	Sir Henry Machu Imbert-Terry, 1st Baronet	3,512	48.4	+6.5
Majority		227	3.2	−13.0
Turnout		7,251	77.6	−5.9
Registered electors		9,349		
Liberal hold		Swing	−6.5	

=== Elections in the 1890s ===
Edward Strachey

General election 1892: South Somerset
Party	Candidate	Votes	%	±%
Liberal	Edward Strachey	4,330	52.5	+0.9
Conservative	Sir Henry Machu Imbert-Terry, 1st Baronet	3,925	47.5	−0.9
Majority		405	5.0	+1.8
Turnout		8,255	85.2	+7.6
Registered electors		9,693		
Liberal hold		Swing	+0.9	

General election 1895: South Somerset
Party	Candidate	Votes	%	±%
Liberal	Edward Strachey	4,167	52.1	−0.4
Conservative	Henry Gribble Turner	3,827	47.9	+0.4
Majority		340	4.2	−0.8
Turnout		7,994	82.5	−2.7
Registered electors		9,692		
Liberal hold		Swing	−0.4	

=== Elections in the 1900s ===
General election 1900: South Somerset
Party	Candidate	Votes	%	±%
Liberal	Edward Strachey	4,349	54.2	+2.1
Conservative	William Mason	3,671	45.8	−2.1
Majority		678	8.4	+4.2
Turnout		8,020	84.8	+2.3
Registered electors		9,462		
Liberal hold		Swing	+2.1	

General election 1906: South Somerset
Party	Candidate	Votes	%	±%
Liberal	Edward Strachey	5,164	61.4	+7.2
Liberal Unionist	B Portman	3,247	38.6	−7.2
Majority		1,917	22.8	+14.4
Turnout		8,411	86.0	+1.2
Registered electors		9,778		
Liberal hold		Swing	+7.2	

=== Elections in the 1910s ===
General election January 1910: South Somerset
Party	Candidate	Votes	%	±%
Liberal	Edward Strachey	4,955	52.7	−8.7
Conservative	Aubrey Herbert	4,444	47.3	+8.7
Majority		511	5.4	−17.4
Turnout		9,399	92.5	+6.5
Registered electors		10,164		
Liberal hold		Swing	-8.7	

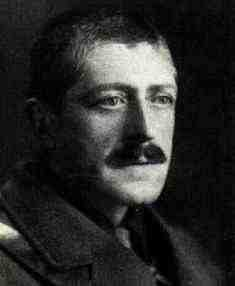
Aubrey Herbert

General election December 1910: South Somerset
Party	Candidate	Votes	%	±%
Liberal	Edward Strachey	4,784	52.6	−0.1
Conservative	Aubrey Herbert	4,317	47.4	+0.1
Majority		467	5.2	−0.2
Turnout		9,101	89.5	−3.0
Registered electors		10,164		
Liberal hold		Swing	−0.1	

Henry Vivian

1911 South Somerset by-election
Party	Candidate	Votes	%	±%
Conservative	Aubrey Herbert	4,878	50.8	+3.4
Lib-Lab	Henry Harvey Vivian	4,730	49.2	−3.4
Majority		148	1.6	N/A
Turnout		9,608	91.1	+1.6
Registered electors		10,546		
Conservative hold		Swing	+3.4	

General Election 1914–15:

Another General Election was required to take place before the end of 1915. The political parties had been making preparations for an election to take place and by July 1914, the following candidates had been selected;

- Unionist: Aubrey Herbert
- Liberal: Henry Harvey Vivian
