= Parliamentary constituencies in Somerset =

The county of Somerset is currently divided into 7 parliamentary constituencies, which are all county constituencies. Three seats cross the county boundary - two are shared with Avon and one with Devon.

== Constituencies ==
† Conservative ‡ Labour ¤ Liberal Democrat

Constituency (Note: BC denotes borough constituency, CC denotes county constituency.)	Electorate	Majority (Note: The majority is the number of votes the winning candidate receives more than their nearest rival.)	Member of Parliament	Nearest opposition	Electoral wards	Map
Bridgwater CC	71,418	1,349	Ashley Fox†	Leigh Redman‡	Sedgemoor District Council: Berrow, Bridgwater Dunwear, Bridgwater Eastover, Bridgwater Fairfax, Bridgwater Hamp, Bridgwater Victoria, Bridgwater Westover, Bridgwater Wyndham, Burnham Central, Burnham North, Cannington and Wembdon, Highbridge and Burnham Marine, Huntspill and Pawlett, King's Isle, North Petherton, Puriton and Woolavington, Quantocks.	Map showing the location of the Bridgwater constituency in Somerset under the boundaries created by the 2023 boundary review and first used at the 2024 general election.
Frome and East Somerset CC (part)	70,177	5,415	Anna Sabine¤	Lucy Trimnell†	Bath and North East Somerset Council: Bathavon South, Midsomer Norton North, Midsomer Norton Redfield, Peasedown, Radstock, Westfield. Mendip District Council: Ammerdown, Ashwick, Chilcompton and Stratton, Beckington and Selwood, Coleford and Holcombe, Cranmore, Doulting and Nunney, Creech, Frome Berkley Down, Frome College, Frome Keyford, Frome Market, Frome Oakfield, Frome Park, Postlebury, Rode and Norton St. Philip, The Pennards and Ditcheat.	Map showing the location of the Frome and East Somerset constituency in Somerset under the boundaries created by the 2023 boundary review and first used at the 2024 general election.
Glastonbury and Somerton CC	70,015	6,611	Sarah Dyke¤	Faye Purbrick†	Mendip District Council: Butleigh and Baltonsborough, Glastonbury St. Benedict's, Glastonbury St. Edmund's, Glastonbury St. John's, Glastonbury St. Mary's, Street North, Street South, Street West. South Somerset District Council: Blackmoor Vale, Bruton, Burrow Hill, Camelot, Cary, Curry Rivel, Huish & Langport, Hamdon, Islemoor, Martock, Milborne Port, Northstone, Ivelchester & St. Michael's, Tower, Turn Hill, Wessex, Wincanton.	Map showing the location of the Glastonbury and Somerton constituency in Somerset under the boundaries created by the 2023 boundary review and first used at the 2024 general election.
Taunton and Wellington CC	76,059	11,939	Gideon Amos¤	Rebecca Pow†	Somerset West and Taunton Council: Blackbrook & Holway, Comeytrowe & Bishop's Hull, Creech St. Michael, Halcon & Lane, Hatch & Blackdown, Manor & Tangier, Monument, North Curry & Ruishton, North Town, Norton Fitzwarren & Staplegrove, Priorswood, Rockwell Green, Trull, Pitminster & Corfe, Victoria, Vivary, Wellington East, Wellington North, Wellington South, Wellsprings & Rowbarton, West Monkton & Cheddon Fitzpaine, Wilton & Sherford.	Map showing the location of the Taunton and Wellington constituency in Somerset under the boundaries created by the 2023 boundary review and first used at the 2024 general election.
Tiverton and Minehead CC (part)	70,829	3,507	Rachel Gilmour¤	Ian Liddell-Grainger†	Mid Devon District Council: Canonsleigh, Castle, Clare and Shuttern, Cranmore, Halberton, Lower Culm, Lowman, Upper Culm, Westexe. Somerset West and Taunton Council: Alcombe, Cotford St. Luke & Oake, Dulverton & District, Exmoor, Milverton & District, Minehead Central, Minehead North, Old Cleeve & District, Periton & Woodcombe, Porlock & District, Quantock Vale, South Quantock, Watchet & Williton, Wiveliscombe & District.	Map showing the location of the Tiverton and Minehead constituency in Somerset under the boundaries created by the 2023 boundary review and first used at the 2024 general election.
Wells and Mendip Hills CC (part)	69,843	11,121	Tessa Munt¤	Meg Powell-Chandler†	Mendip District Council: Chewton Mendip and Ston Easton, Croscombe and Pilton, Moor, Rodney and Westbury, Shepton East, Shepton West, St. Cuthbert Out North, Wells Central, Wells St. Cuthbert's, Wells St. Thomas', Wookey and St. Cuthbert Out West. North Somerset Council: Banwell & Winscombe, Blagdon & Churchill, Congresbury & Puxton, Yatton. Sedgemoor District Council: Axevale, Cheddar and Shipham, East Polden, Knoll, Wedmore and Mark, West Polden.	Map showing the location of the Wells and Mendip Hills constituency in Somerset under the boundaries created by the 2023 boundary review and first used at the 2024 general election.
Yeovil CC	76,056	12,286	Adam Dance¤	Marcus Fysh†	South Somerset District Council: Blackdown & Tatworth, Brympton, Chard Avishayes, Chard Combe, Chard Crimchard, Chard Holyrood, Chard Jocelyn, Coker, Crewkerne, Eggwood, Ilminster, Neroche, Parrett, South Petherton, Windwhistle, Yeovil College, Yeovil Lyde, Yeovil Summerlands, Yeovil Westland, Yeovil without.	Map showing the location of the Yeovil constituency in Somerset under the boundaries created by the 2023 boundary review and first used at the 2024 general election.

== 2024 boundary changes ==
See 2023 Periodic Review of Westminster constituencies for further details.

Former name	Boundaries 2010–2024	Current name	Boundaries 2024–present
1. Bridgwater and West Somerset CC; 2. Somerton and Frome CC; 3. Taunton Deane CC; 4. Wells CC; 5. Yeovil CC	Proposed Revision	1. Bridgwater CC; 2. Frome and East Somerset CC; 3. Glastonbury and Somerton CC; 4. Taunton and Wellington CC; 5. Tiverton and Minehead CC; 6. Wells and Mendip Hills CC; 7. Yeovil CC	Numbered map of the parliamentary constituencies of Somerset created by the 2023 boundary review and first used at the 2024 UK general election.

For the 2023 Periodic Review of Westminster constituencies, which redrew the constituency map ahead of the 2024 United Kingdom general election, the Boundary Commission for England opted to combine Somerset with Avon and Devon as a sub-region of the South West Region, resulting in significant change to the existing pattern of constituencies. In Somerset, only the constituency of Yeovil retained its name with relatively minor changes. The boundary changes created the cross-county boundary constituencies of Frome and East Somerset, Wells and Mendip Hills, and Tiverton and Minehead. Bridgwater was re-established as a constituency, replacing Bridgwater and West Somerset, while the new constituency of Glastonbury and Somerton largely replaced Somerton and Frome. Taunton Deane was renamed Taunton and Wellington.

The boundary commission recommended the following seats within Somerset:

Containing electoral wards from Mendip

- Frome and East Somerset (part)^{1}
- Glastonbury and Somerton (part)
- Wells and Mendip Hills (part)^{2}

Containing electoral wards from Sedgemoor

- Bridgwater
- Wells and Mendip Hills (part)^{2}

Containing electoral wards from Somerset West and Taunton

- Taunton and Wellington
- Tiverton and Minehead (part)^{3}

Containing electoral wards from South Somerset

- Glastonbury and Somerton (part)
- Yeovil

^{1}Also contains electoral wards in the District of Bath and North East Somerset

^{2}Also contains electoral wards in the District of North Somerset

^{3}Also contains electoral wards in the Devon District of Mid Devon

== Results history ==
Primary data source: House of Commons research briefing - General election results from 1918 to 2019

=== 2024 ===
The number of votes cast for each political party who fielded candidates in constituencies comprising Somerset in the 2024 general election were as follows: (Note: Includes the cross-county constituency of Tiverton and Minehead which has an electorate predominantly based in Somerset.)

Party	Votes	%	Change from 2019	Seats	Change from 2019
Liberal Democrats	114,443	36.5%	▲7.5%	6	▲6
Conservative	88,408	28.2%	▼28.5%	1	▼4
Reform	53,160	17.0%	New	0	0
Labour	34,865	11.1%	▲0.7%	0	0
Green	18,076	5.8%	▲3.6%	0	0
Others	4,314	1.4%	▼0.1%	0	0
Total	313,266	100.0		7	

=== Percentage votes ===
Note that before 1983 Somerset was analysed under its Ceremonial definition (including the southern part of what became analysed at boundary reviews as Avon, see Avon's list of seats).

Election year	1918	1922	1923	1924	1929	1931	1935	1945	1950	1951	1955	1959	1964	1966	1970	1974(F)	1974(O)	1979	1983	1987	1992	1997	2001	2005	2010	2015	2017	2019	2024
Liberal Democrat^{1}	13.5	29.6	42.0	30.5	32.3	13.7	19.2	8.8	12.7	1.8	4.6	14.2	20.2	16.1	11.6	28.1	26.9	22.7	37.0	37.6	40.2	40.6	39.6	40.1	45.1	23.9	25.4	29.0	36.5
Conservative	61.5	51.1	47.4	52.9	45.4	66.6	55.4	45.5	47.0	55.0	54.8	51.4	45.9	45.8	53.2	44.7	43.8	52.3	51.2	50.6	45.3	36.5	40.9	41.4	41.5	47.2	53.9	56.7	28.2
Reform	-	-	-	-	-	-	-	-	-	-	-	-	-	-	-	-	-	-	-	-	-	-	-	-	-	-	-	-	17.0
Labour	24.3	19.3	10.6	16.6	22.3	19.7	25.4	39.8	38.3	43.2	40.6	34.4	33.3	38.1	35.0	27.0	28.6	24.0	11.7	11.7	12.9	17.4	16.5	14.9	7.7	9.5	17.0	10.6	11.1
Green Party	-	-	-	-	-	-	-	-	-	-	-	-	-	-	-	-	-		-	*	*	*	*	*	0.5	5.3	1.8	2.2	5.8
UKIP	-	-	-	-	-	-	-	-	-	-	-	-	-	-	-	-	-	-	-	-	-	*	*	*	3.7	12.9	1.2	*	-
Other	0.8	-	-	-	-	-	-	5.9	2.0	-	-	-	0.7	-	0.2	0.2	0.6	1.0	0.1	-	1.5	5.4	2.9	3.6	1.4	1.2	0.7	1.5	1.4

^{1}pre-1979: Liberal Party; 1983 & 1987: SDP–Liberal Alliance

* Included in Other

=== Seats ===
Election year	1950	1951	1955	1959	1964	1966	1970	1974(F)	1974(O)	1979	1983	1987	1992	1997	2001	2005	2010	2015	2017	2019	2024
Liberal Democrat^{1}	0	0	0	0	0	0	0	0	0	0	1	1	1	3	2	3	4	0	0	0	6
Conservative	7	7	7	7	7	7	7	7	7	7	4	4	4	2	3	2	1	5	5	5	1
Total	7	7	7	7	7	7	7	7	7	7	5	5	5	5	5	5	5	5	5	5	7

^{1}1983 & 1987 - SDP–Liberal Alliance

=== Maps ===
==== 1885-1910 ====
1885

1886

1892

1895

1900

1906

Jan 1910

Dec 1910

==== 1918-1945 ====
1918

1922

1923

1924

1929

1931

1935

1945

==== 1950-1979 ====
1950

1951

1955

1959

1964

1966

1970

Feb 1974

Oct 1974

1979

==== 1983-2019 ====
1983

1987

1992

1997

2001

2005

2010

2015

2017

2019

==== 2024-present (including constituencies that cover parts of Devon and Avon) ====
2024

== Historical representation by party ==
A cell marked → (with a different colour background to the preceding cell) indicates that the previous MP continued to sit under a new party name.

=== 1885 to 1918 (10 MPs) ===
Conservative Liberal Liberal Unionist

Constituency	1885	1886	87	1892	1895	96	99	1900	1906	09	Jan 1910	Dec 1910	11	12	18
Bath	Blaine	Laurie		Murray					Maclean		A. Thynne				Foxcroft
Bath	Wodehouse	→							Gooch		Hunter				
Bridgwater	Stanley								Montgomery		Sanders				
Frome	Baker	T. Thynne		Barlow	T. Thynne	Barlow									
Somerset Eastern	Hobhouse	→							Thompson		Jardine			→	
Somerset Northern	Llewellyn			Warner	Llewellyn				Hope		King				
Somerset Southern	Lambart			Strachey									Herbert		
Taunton	S. Allsopp		A. Allsopp		Welby				Boyle	Peel				Wills	
Wellington	Dyke Acland	Elton		Fuller-Acland-Hood									Boles		
Wells	Paget				Jolliffe		Dickinson		Silcock		Sandys				

=== 1918 to 1950 (7 MPs) ===
Common Wealth Conservative Independent Progressive Labour Liberal

Constituency	1918	21	1922	23	1923	1924	29	1929	1931	34	1935	38	39	42	1945
Bath	Foxcroft				Raffety	Foxcroft	Baillie-Hamilton		Guinness						Pitman
Bridgwater	Sanders				Morse	Wood		Croom-Johnson				Bartlett		→	→
Frome	Hurd				Gould	Peto		Gould	Thynne		Tate				Farthing
Taunton	Boles	Griffith-Boscawen	Simpson			Gault					Wickham				Collins
Wells	Greer		Bruford		Hobhouse	Sanders		Muirhead					Boles		
Weston-super-Mare	Wills		Erskine		Murrell	Erskine				Orr-Ewing					
Yeovil	Herbert			Davies											Kingsmill

=== 1950 to 1983 (7 MPs) ===
Conservative

Constituency	1950	1951	1955	56	58	1959	1964	1966	69	70	1970	Feb 74	Oct 74	1979
Bath	Pitman						Brown							Patten
Bridgwater	Wills									King				
Somerset North	Leather						Dean							
Taunton	Hopkinson			du Cann										
Wells	Boles	Maydon									Boscawen			
Weston-super-Mare	Orr-Ewing				Webster				Wiggin					
Yeovil	Kingsmill	Peyton												

=== 1983 to 2024 (5 MPs) ===
Conservative Independent Liberal Liberal Democrats

Constituency	1983	1987	88	1992	1997	2001	2005	2010	2015	2017	2019	22	23
Bridgwater / Bridgwater and West Somerset (2010-)	King					Liddell-Grainger							
Somerton and Frome	Boscawen			Robinson	Heath				Warburton			→	Dyke
Taunton / Taunton Deane (2010-)	du Cann	Nicholson			Ballard	Flook	Browne		Pow				
Wells	Heathcoat-Amory							Munt	Heappey				
Yeovil	Ashdown		→			Laws			Fysh				

=== 2024 onwards (7 MPs, including constituencies that cover parts of Devon and Avon) ===
Conservative Liberal Democrats

Constituency	2024
Bridgwater	Fox
Frome and East Somerset^{1}	Sabine
Glastonbury and Somerton	Dyke
Taunton and Wellington	Amos
Tiverton and Minehead^{2}	Gilmour
Wells and Mendip Hills^{1}	Munt
Yeovil	Dance

^{1}partly in Avon ^{2}partly in Devon

== See also ==
- List of constituencies in South West England
- List of parliamentary constituencies in Avon for those covering the Bath and North East Somerset and North Somerset unitary authorities.
