= Bridgwater by-election =

Bridgwater by-election may refer to:

- 1918 Bridgwater by-election
- 1938 Bridgwater by-election
- 1970 Bridgwater by-election
