= Edward Popham (disambiguation) =

Edward Popham (1610–1651) was an English naval commander and MP for Minehead.

Edward Popham may also refer to:

- Edward Popham (died 1586) (by 1530 –1586), MP for Guildford in 1558, Hythe in 1563, and Bridgwater in 1571, 1572
- Edward Popham (MP for Bridgwater) (1581–1641), MP for Bridgwater, 1621 to 1626
- Edward Popham (died 1772) (1711–1772), MP for Great Bedwyn, and for Wiltshire
