= 1970 Bridgwater by-election =

UK parliamentary by-election

- 12 March 1970

Bridgwater constituency
- Turnout: 70.3% (▼9.9 pp)
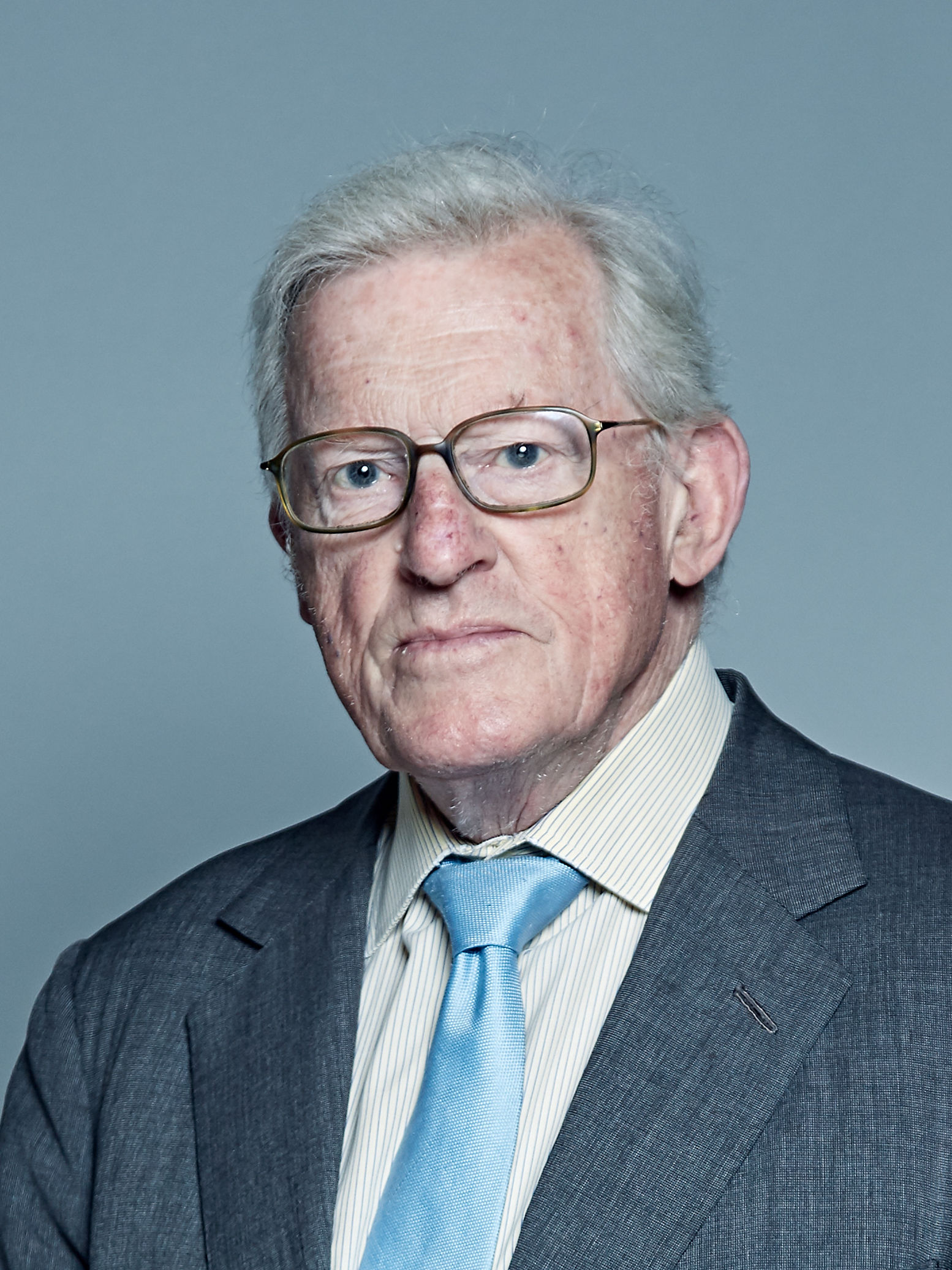
	First party	Second party	Third party
Candidate	Tom King	Richard Mayer	Patrick O'Loughlin
Party	Conservative	Labour	Liberal
Popular vote	25,687	14,772	5,832
Percentage	55.5%	31.9%	12.6%
Swing	▲11.1 pp	▼6.2 pp	▼4.9 pp
MP before election
Gerald Wills
Conservative
Elected MP
Tom King
Conservative

The 1970 Bridgwater by-election of 12 March 1970 was the first election in the United Kingdom to be held after the voting age had been reduced from 21 to 18 via the Representation of the People Act 1969. The seat was held by the Conservatives on a turnout of 70.3%.

== Result ==
Bridgwater by-election, 1970
Party	Candidate	Votes	%	±%
Conservative	Tom King	25,687	55.5	+11.1
Labour	Richard Mayer	14,772	31.9	–6.2
Liberal	Patrick O'Loughlin	5,832	12.6	–4.9
Majority		10,915	23.6	+17.3
Turnout		46,291	70.3	–9.9
Conservative hold		Swing	+8.6	

== See also ==
- 1918 Bridgwater by-election
- 1938 Bridgwater by-election
