= Arthur Sanders (cricketer) =

English cricketer

Arthur Thomas Sanders (21 December 1900 – 22 November 1920) played first-class cricket for Somerset in one match in the 1919 season. He was born and died at Westminster, London.

Sanders was the only son of Robert Sanders, 1st Baron Bayford, the Conservative Member of Parliament for Bridgwater and Wells between 1910 and 1929. He was educated at Harrow School and topped the batting averages in his last cricket season in the school team, 1918, when he made 216 runs as a middle-order batsman with a highest score of 57 not out. Wartime meant that the set-piece Eton v Harrow cricket match normally held at Lord's was not played, and Sanders did not do well in the two one-day school matches arranged in the 1918 season between Harrow and Eton College: the Harrow team in his time was "decidedly mediocre", according to a 2017 book. He played in just one first-class match, batting at No 9 for Somerset in the match against Essex at Leyton and failing to score in his only innings in the match. His death barely a year later and before the age of 20 went unrecorded in Wisden Cricketers' Almanack.

The circumstances of Sanders's death did not, however, go unrecorded elsewhere: The Times of London reported it as "Suicide in the Tower". Having initially been rejected by the Royal Military College, Sandhurst, Sanders was accepted in January 1919 and graduated in the summer of 1920 to be commissioned into the Third Battalion of the Grenadier Guards as a second lieutenant. In November 1920, the inquest on him was told that he was stationed at the Tower of London, but had dined on the evening of Sunday 21 November with his father, who lived in Eaton Square, Belgravia; he had told his father he had run up a £200 gambling debt, which his annual allowance of £500 was unable to cover. He returned to his regiment at the Tower, and was called the following morning by his orderly; but when he had not appeared an hour later, the orderly returned and found that Sanders had shot himself in the temple. The inquest was told that the gambling debt was £700 rather than the £200 Sanders had admitted to his father, and there was a further £900 debt that was being investigated; the coroner recorded a verdict of "suicide while in a state of unsound mind".
