= Popular Front (UK) =

Attempted political alliance of leftist politicians in 1930s Britain

- Founders: Richard Acland; Robert Boothby; G. D. H. Cole; John Strachey
- Founded: December 1936
- Dissolved: May 1940
- Merged into: Churchill war ministry
- Ideology: Anti-fascism; Factions: Communism; Conservatism; Liberalism; Socialism
- Political position: Big tent

The Popular Front in the United Kingdom was an attempted alliance between political parties and individuals of the left and centre-left in the late 1930s to come together to challenge the appeasement policies of the National Government led by Neville Chamberlain.

The Popular Front (PF), despite not having the formal endorsement of either the Labour Party or the Liberal Party, fielded candidates at parliamentary by-elections with success. There was no general election to test the support of the PF, and therefore the opportunity for it to form a government.

== Origins of the Popular Front ==
The Popular Front was launched in December 1936 by the Liberal Richard Acland, the Communist John Strachey, Labour's economist G. D. H. Cole, and the Conservative Robert Boothby. Acland and Boothby were both serving in the House of Commons at the time.

The Communist Party of Great Britain took its lead from Stalin's Communist Party of the Soviet Union (CPSU), which in the mid-to-late 1930s directed Communist parties across Europe to form Popular fronts with all other anti-Fascist parties to counter the surging power of Fascism.

=== Richard Acland ===
Richard Acland was a new Liberal member of parliament who had gained Barnstaple from the Conservatives at the 1935 election. He quickly became an influential figure on the left of the Liberal Party, advocating closer ties with the Labour Party and electoral co-operation with them at constituency level. He also became an outspoken supporter of a Popular Front, and then one of its founders.

=== John Strachey ===
Strachey was elected as a Labour Member of Parliament for Birmingham Aston in 1929, serving until 1931. He was Parliamentary Private Secretary to Oswald Mosley and resigned from the Parliamentary Labour Party in 1931 to join Mosley's New Party. Following the New Party's drift towards fascism, he resigned to become a supporter of the Communist Party, contesting the Aston constituency as an independent.

As the author of The Coming Struggle for Power (1932), and a series of other works, Strachey was one of the most prolific and widely read British Marxist-Leninist theorists of the 1930s. In 1936 with the publisher Victor Gollancz he founded the Left Book Club.

=== G. D. H. Cole ===
Cole was an Oxford academic, writer and political theorist who favoured libertarian socialism. He was a notable figure in the Labour Party. In 1936 Cole began calling for a Popular Front movement in Britain, where the Labour Party would ally with other parties against the threat of fascism.

=== Robert Boothby ===
Boothby had been the Scottish Unionist Party Member for Aberdeen and Kincardine East since 1924. He was Parliamentary Private Secretary to Chancellor of the Exchequer Winston Churchill from 1926 to 1929.

== United Front ==
The PF campaign was preceded by the United Front campaign. The campaign for a United Front, sought to get co-operation between the Labour Party, the Independent Labour Party and the Communist Party of Great Britain. A major part of that unity campaign was to have electoral co-operation against the National Government at a future general election. In 1931 the ILP had disaffiliated from the Labour Party and at the 1935 General Election the ILP and the Labour Party had fielded candidates against each other that had resulted in cases of the National Government candidate winning due to a split left vote. Within the Labour Party, one of the leading figures in support of the United Front was Sir Stafford Cripps. By 1937 the Labour Party showed little indication for resolving this issue and those within it ranks such as Cripps faced expulsion as a result.

=== Sir Stafford Cripps ===
He was Labour MP for Bristol East and Solicitor General in the last Labour government of 1931. He had not given up on trying to unite the left and saw that supporting the Popular Front would achieve the same aims. In putting the case for a Popular Front, he argued that the Labour Party acting alone would not be able to defeat the National Government.

== Party responses to the Popular Front ==
=== Communist Party ===
The Communist Party of Great Britain took its lead from the Communist Party of the Soviet Union (CPSU). The view of the CPSU in the mid-to-late 1930s was that Communist parties across Europe should form Popular fronts to work with all other anti-Fascist parties to oppose Fascism. The CPGB was happy to fall in line with this position.

=== Independent Labour Party ===
The ILP, who had chosen not to affiliate with the Labour Party during the 1930s, had been supporters of the United Front with Socialists and Communists. However, they did not support the Popular Front as it was to include the Liberal Party. At the 1937 ILP Conference they voted to oppose a Popular Front but to continue to support a United Front. At their 1938 Conference, leader James Maxton re-affirmed his party's opposition to the Popular Front. The ILP remained an opponent of any co-operation with capitalist parties, even after war broke out in 1939. When all the political parties agreed to a wartime electoral truce, the ILP refused to agree.

=== Labour Party ===
The Labour Party National Executive published a letter on 13 April 1938, opposing the Popular Front.

==== Co-operative Party ====
The Co-operative Party, which was affiliated to the Labour Party, held its 1938 Conference during April. Party Chairman Alfred Barnes personally endorsed the Popular Front and 2 days later, the conference voted in favour of the Popular Front. However, when the Co-operative Party met in 1939 for its Conference, this position was narrowly overturned.

=== Liberal Party ===
The attitude of the Liberal Party gradually changed during this period. At the 1935 General Election, former party leader David Lloyd George, through his Council of Action had demonstrated a willingness to support both Liberal and Labour candidates. After the 1935 elections Lloyd George and his parliamentary group returned to the mainstream Liberal Party and continued with the Council of Action. The first time the Liberal Party formally considered the Popular Front was at a meeting of their executive committee on 20 October 1936. They had received the proposal to support the Popular Front from writer and philosopher Aldous Huxley. Their response was to recommend to the Liberal Party Council that the front not be supported. They stated that the executive did not think that an electoral pact with Labour was possible and arguably desirable. At the meeting of the Party Council on 18 January 1937, this position was agreed. In April 1937 the issue was debated at the Union of University Liberal Societies Conference. Once again the front was rejected.

== Popular Front by-elections ==
At the 1937 Combined English Universities by-election former Liberal MP Thomas Edmund Harvey gained the seat from the Conservatives standing as an Independent Progressive, seeking to rally anti-government supporters on the left. The success of this campaign caused many left leaning academics to consider if candidates standing under a similar platform could be as successful in non-University seats. Throughout the parliament, the National Government would frequently find themselves only opposed by one opposition candidate, either Labour or Liberal. Some of these candidates sought to campaign on the Popular Front platform, with varying degrees of support from other parties. There were few specific cases of an anti-government candidate standing on a Popular Front platform as opposed to a party platform. In such cases these candidates ran as Independent Progressive.

=== Oxford ===
The 1938 Oxford by-election was held on 27 October 1938. The Liberal Party had selected Ivor Davies, a 23-year-old graduate of Edinburgh University, despite the fact that he was the candidate for Central Aberdeenshire at the same time. The Labour Party selected Patrick Gordon Walker, who had contested the seat at the 1935 general election. On 13 September, Davies offered to stand down from the by-election if Labour did the same and backed a Popular Front candidate against the Conservatives. Eventually, Gordon Walker reluctantly stood down and both parties supported Sandy Lindsay, who was the Master of Balliol, as an Independent Progressive. The Conservatives held the seat with a reduced majority of 3,434 or 12.2%.

Oxford by-election, 1938
Party	Candidate	Votes	%	±%
Conservative	Quintin Hogg	15,797	56.1	−6.7
Independent Progressive	Sandy Lindsay	12,363	43.9	N/A
Majority		3,434	12.2	−13.4
Turnout		28,160	76.3	+9.0
Conservative hold		Swing	-6.7	

=== Bridgwater ===
The 1938 Bridgwater by-election was held on 17 November 1938. Vernon Bartlett was a journalist and broadcaster with extensive experience of foreign affairs. He was approached by Richard Acland, Liberal MP for Barnstaple, a seat bordering Bridgwater, about standing as an anti-appeasement candidate in the by-election. Bartlett agreed to do so providing he had the support of the Liberal and Labour parties. The Bridgwater Liberal Party unanimously backed Bartlett's candidature. Before the by-election vacancy was known, the local Labour Party had already re-adopted Arthur Loveys their previous candidate, to contest a General Election expected to occur in 1939. Loveys withdrew and Labour generally supported Bartlett, although many in the Labour Party were unenthusiastic about co-operation with the Liberals. Some Labour voters were reluctant to support Bartlett, believing he was really a Liberal candidate. However, he did receive a letter of support from 39 Labour MPs just before polling day. Bartlett won the seat with a majority of 2,332 or 6.3%. He hailed the result as a defeat for Chamberlain, saying that it showed people understood the dangers of the Government's foreign policy.

Bridgwater by-election, 17th November 1938
Party	Candidate	Votes	%	±%
Independent Progressive	Vernon Bartlett	19,540	53.2	n/a
Conservative	Patrick Heathcoat-Amory	17,208	46.8	−10.1
Majority		2,332	6.3	39.8
Turnout		36,748	82.3	+9.6
Independent Progressive gain from Conservative		Swing	n/a	

=== Westminster Abbey ===
The 1939 Westminster Abbey by-election was held on 17 May 1939. The Labour candidate in 1935, William Kennedy, had been re-selected to contest the next General Election, however, the Labour party decided not to contest the by-election. The Communist party, who had not contested the seat before, chose Dr. Billy Carritt, to stand. In an attempt to revive the Popular Front strategy, Carritt stood as an Independent Progressive. Carritt attracted the highest ever percentage poll of any anti-Conservative candidate in this seat. The performance revived interest nationally in electoral co-operation to defeat National Government candidates at a General Election.

Westminster Abbey by-election, 1939
Party	Candidate	Votes	%	±%
Conservative	William Harold Webbe	9,678	67.4	−10.1
Independent Progressive	Dr G. Billy Carritt	4,674	32.6	N/A
Majority		5,004	34.8	−20.2
Turnout		47,396	30.3	−18.9
Conservative hold		Swing	N/A	

== Popular Front in the constituencies ==
Despite the defeat of the Popular Fronters at the Labour Conference, co-operation between constituency Labour and Liberal organisation continued to grow through the year. It was widely anticipated that Prime Minister Neville Chamberlain would call a general election in 1939 and all political parties were going through the process of selecting local candidates.

=== Tiverton ===
Tiverton had been a Conservative seat since they took it from the Liberals in 1923. No Liberal or Labour candidate had stood since 1929. The Liberals had selected a candidate, A. Turner, back in 1938. There was no Labour candidate in place. The former Liberal MP for Tiverton was the North Cornwall Liberal MP, Sir Francis Acland. He was the father of PF founder, Richard Acland. The Aclands had a strong influence over the Tiverton Liberal Association. The Tiverton Liberals were open to the idea of supporting an Independent Progressive, if such a candidate were supported by the local Labour party. It was thought that another Liberal, Michael Pinney, would appeal more to the local Labour Party. By March 1939 Pinney had agreed to stand as a Popular Front candidate and Turner had agreed to withdraw in his favour. In April 1939 the local Liberals and the local Labour Party both formally endorsed Pinney. In May 1939 the national Labour Party decided to bar the Tiverton division from the party.

== Aftermath ==
Calls for a Popular Front ceased when Britain declared war on Nazi Germany. However, it was becoming increasingly recognised that during wartime, it was better to have a broad based government that could command all-party support. By May 1940 Winston Churchill had become Prime Minister and had included in his new government other Conservative anti-appeasers and the leaders of the Labour and Liberal parties. The Communist Party's support for co-operation fluctuated depending on the foreign policy of the Soviet Union. John Strachey left the party and re-joined the Labour Party. The ILP was to take a semi-anti-war position. In 1940 Cripps was appointed by Winston Churchill as Ambassador to the Soviet Union. In 1942 Acland broke from the Liberals to found the socialist Common Wealth Party with J. B. Priestley, opposing the war-time electoral truce between the major parties. At the 1945 General election, there were a handful of instances of Labour not running candidates in Con/Lib constituencies, but essentially there was no electoral co-operation between Labour, Liberal and Communist or even in Bridgwater where Labour decided to oppose Vernon Bartlett standing for re-election as a Progressive.
