= John Sydenham (14th-century MP) =

English politician

John Sydenham, of Somerset, was MP for the Bridgwater constituency of the parliament of England six times between 1377 and 1397. He was recorded as a tax collector in Somerset in 1382, 1392 and 1401. During the Peasants' Revolt of 1381 his manor house at Sydenham, near Bridgwater was ransacked and goods to the value of £100 stolen. His daughter Ida married Robert Boson, who was MP for Bridgwater in the 1393 parliament.
