= Bridgwater and West Somerset =

UK Parliament constituency (2010–2024)

Coordinates: 51.1300°N 3.3100°W

- Former county constituency for the House of Commons
- Boundary of Bridgwater and West Somerset in Somerset

- Location of Somerset within England
- County: Somerset
- Population: 106,450 (2011 census)
- Electorate: 82,936 (December 2010)
- Major settlements: Bridgwater

2010–2024
- Seats: One
- Created from: Bridgwater, Taunton
- Replaced by: Wells and Mendip Hills, Bridgwater

Bridgwater and West Somerset was a constituency (Note: A county constituency (for the purposes of election expenses and type of returning officer)) represented in the House of Commons of the UK Parliament from 2010 until the seat's dissolution in 2024 by Ian Liddell-Grainger, a Conservative. (Note: As with all constituencies, the constituency elects one Member of Parliament (MP) by the first past the post system of election at least every five years.)

Further to the completion of the 2023 Periodic Review of Westminster constituencies, the seat will be subject to boundary changes, with the loss of the area comprising the former District of West Somerset to the newly created constituency of Tiverton and Minehead. This will be partly offset by the addition of the communities of Burnham-on-Sea and Highbridge. As a consequence of these changes, the constituency reverted to its former name of Bridgwater, first contested at the 2024 general election.

== History ==
Bridgwater was one of the original parliamentary borough constituencies in England (Note: Original is usually classified as sending representatives to the Model Parliament of 1295.) (with fifteen years of non-existence in the late 19th century after the seat was abolished for corruption in 1870 and being subsumed into a slightly larger seat on a review of Somerset's representation by the Boundary Commission in 1885).

In 2010 seven candidates stood. The second placed candidate was a Liberal Democrat, Theo Butt Philip, 11.2% ahead of the candidate from the Labour Party. Its only MP, Ian Liddell-Grainger, is a former Major in the Territorial Army, farmer and defence advisor.

In the snap election of 2017 Liddell-Grainger increased his majority to 15,000, the largest in the constituency's history, and Labour finished second in the seat for the first time.

== Boundaries ==
Map of boundaries 2010–2024

2010–2024: The District of Sedgemoor wards of Bridgwater Bower, Bridgwater Eastover, Bridgwater Hamp, Bridgwater Quantock, Bridgwater Sydenham, Bridgwater Victoria, Cannington and Quantocks, East Poldens, Huntspill and Pawlett, King's Isle, North Petherton, Puriton, Sandford, West Poldens, and Woolavington, and the District of West Somerset.

== Members of Parliament ==
See also: Bridgwater constituency

Election	Member	Party
2010	Ian Liddell-Grainger	Conservative
2024	constituency abolished	

== Elections ==
=== Elections in the 2010s ===
General election 2019: Bridgwater and West Somerset
Party	Candidate	Votes	%	±%
Conservative	Ian Liddell-Grainger	35,827	62.1	+7.0
Labour	Oliver Thornton	11,388	19.8	−8.8
Liberal Democrats	Bill Revans	7,805	13.5	+2.6
Green	Mickie Ritchie	1,877	3.3	+1.5
Liberal	Fares Moussa	755	1.3	New
Majority		24,439	42.3	+15.8
Turnout		57,652	67.9	+2.6
Conservative hold		Swing	+7.9	

General election 2017: Bridgwater and West Somerset
Party	Candidate	Votes	%	±%
Conservative	Ian Liddell-Grainger	32,111	55.1	+9.1
Labour	Wes Hinckes	16,663	28.6	+11.0
Liberal Democrats	Marcus Kravis	6,332	10.9	−1.5
UKIP	Simon Smedley	2,102	3.6	−15.6
Green	Kay Powell	1,059	1.8	−3.0
Majority		15,448	26.5	−0.3
Turnout		58,267	65.3	−2.3
Conservative hold		Swing	−0.9	

General election 2015: Bridgwater and West Somerset
Party	Candidate	Votes	%	±%
Conservative	Ian Liddell-Grainger	25,020	46.0	+0.7
UKIP	Stephen Fitzgerald	10,437	19.2	+14.4
Labour	Michael Lerry	9,589	17.6	+0.5
Liberal Democrats	Theo Butt Philip	6,765	12.4	−15.9
Green	Julie Harvey-Smith	2,636	4.8	+3.2
Majority		14,583	26.8	+9.8
Turnout		54,447	67.6	−3.6
Conservative hold		Swing	−6.9	

The Liberal Democrats initially selected Justine Baker as their candidate. After being accepted for Bridgwater and West Somerset, Baker resigned in order to apply to stand as the candidate for Taunton Deane, a more 'winnable' seat; she was not successful, and ultimately was not a candidate anywhere at the 2015 general election. She was replaced by Theo Butt Philip, who had been the Liberal Democrat candidate at the 2010 general election.

General election 2010: Bridgwater and West Somerset
Party	Candidate	Votes	%	±%
Conservative	Ian Liddell-Grainger*	24,675	45.3	
Liberal Democrats	Theo Butt Philip	15,426	28.3	
Labour	Kathy Pearce	9,332	17.1	
UKIP	Peter Hollings	2,604	4.8	
BNP	Donna Treanor	1,282	2.4	
Green	Charles Graham	859	1.6	
Independent	Bob Cudlipp	315	0.6	
Majority		9,249	17.0	
Turnout		54,493	71.2	
Conservative win (new seat)				

* Served as the MP for Bridgwater 2001–2010

== See also ==
- List of parliamentary constituencies in Somerset
