= John Pitt (Bridgwater MP) =

Member of Parliament for Bridgwater
- In office 1421–1435

Personal details
- Died: After October 1441

John Pitt was an English politician who was a member of parliament (MP) for Bridgwater in Somerset from 1421 to 1435.
