= John Kedwelly =

English politician

John Kedwelly (fl. 1383–1420) was an English politician. He sat as MP for Bridgwater in 1395, January 1397, 1399, 1402, 1410, November 1414 and 1417.

He also served as town clerk of Bridgwater by October 1383 till after April 1418 and as commissioner of inquiry in Bridgwater in April 1401 concerning goods of William le Scrope, Earl of Wiltshire.
