= John Palmer (fl. 1377–1394) =

English politician

John Palmer (fl. 1377–1394) of Butleigh, Somerset, was an English politician.

He was a Member (MP) of the Parliament of England for Bath in November 1384. He was MP for Bridgwater in January 1377, 1378, February 1383, October 1383, April 1384, 1385, September 1388, January 1390 and 1394, and for Wells in 1385.
