= George Patton, Lord Glenalmond =

Scottish politician and judge

George Patton, Lord Glenalmond, PC (1803 – 20 September 1869) was a Scottish politician and judge.

== Life ==
He studied at University of Glasgow and Trinity College, Cambridge. He was Conservative Member of Parliament for Bridgwater, Somerset from 1865 to 1866. He was appointed Solicitor General for Scotland in 1859 and Lord Advocate in 1866, and nominated himself for appointment to the bench as Lord Justice Clerk in 1867 with the judicial title Lord Glenalmond, partly to avoid inquiry into charges of bribery in connection with his election to Parliament. He was sworn as a Privy Counsellor in November 1867. He committed suicide in September 1869.

In 1866 he was living at 30 Heriot Row, Edinburgh.

== Glenalmond College ==
The school now known as Glenalmond College was built on land given by George Patton who for the rest of his life, in company with his wife, took a keen interest in its development and success.

== Family ==
On 25 March 1857 in Edinburgh, he married Margaret Bethune (1823–1899). She was the younger daughter of Lieutenant-General Alexander Bethune of Blebo (1771–1847), son of Major-General Sir William Sharp, 6th Baronet and Margaret Bethune, and his wife Maria Low (1794–1886), daughter of Robert James Low of Clatto and his wife Susanna Elizabeth Malcolm.

There were no children. His widow continued to run the Glenalmond estate for the rest of her life and on 2 January 1871 in Edinburgh married Robert Malcolm.

Parliament of the United Kingdom
Preceded by Henry Westropp; Alexander William Kinglake	Member of Parliament for Bridgwater; 1866; With: Alexander William Kinglake	Succeeded by Alexander William Kinglake; Philip Vanderbyl
Legal offices
Preceded by James Moncreiff	Lord Advocate; 1866–1867	Succeeded by Edward Gordon
Preceded by Lord Glencorse	Lord Justice Clerk; 1867–1869	Succeeded by Lord Moncreiff
