= Alexander William Kinglake =

English travel writer and historian (1809–1891)

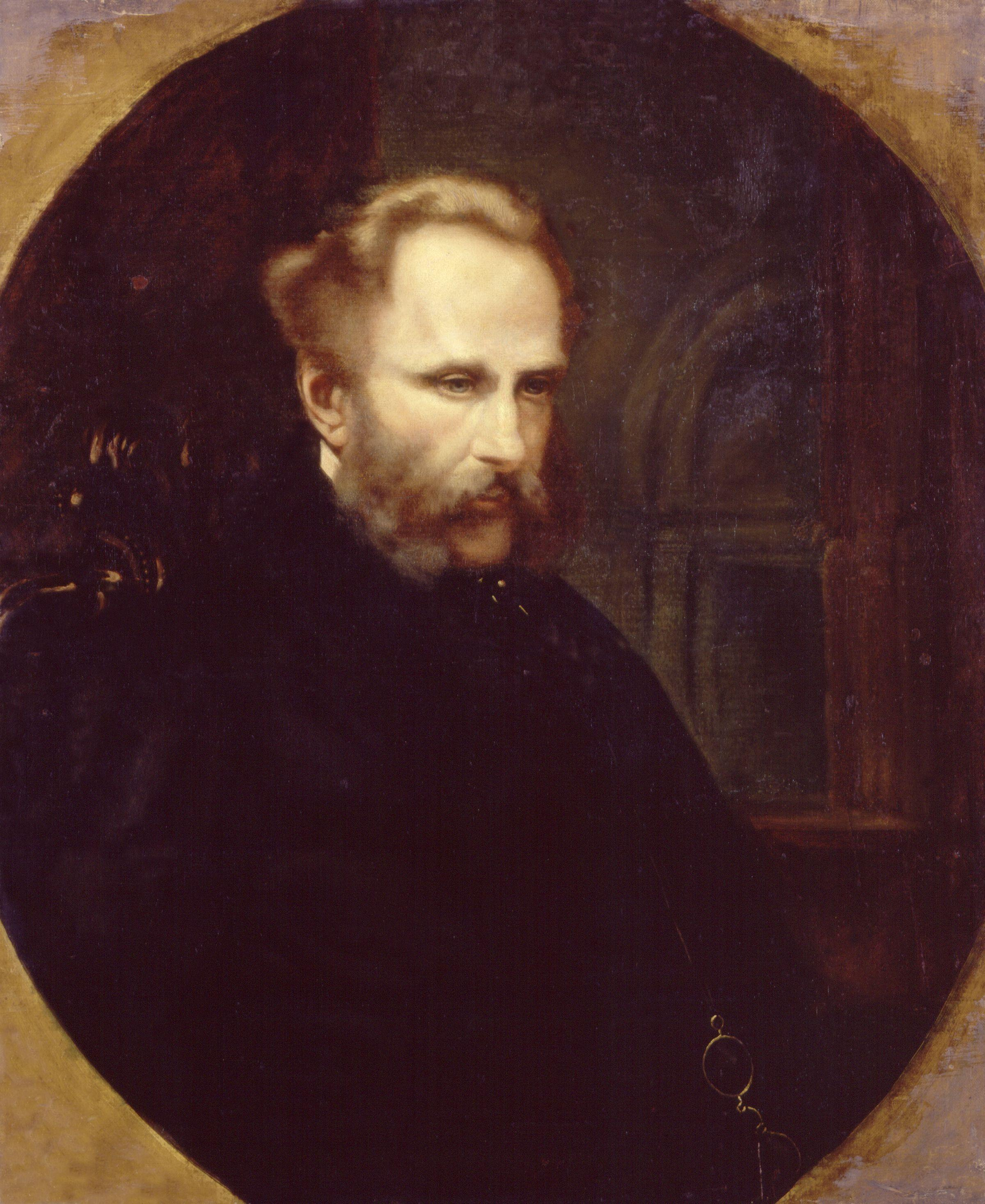
- 1863 portrait by Harriet M. Haviland
- Born: 5 August 1809; Near Taunton, Somerset
- Died: 2 January 1891 (aged 81)
- Education: Eton College; Trinity College, Cambridge; Lincoln's Inn
- Occupations: Travel writer, historian

Alexander William Kinglake (5 August 1809 – 2 January 1891) was an English orientalist travel writer and historian. He was the author of a multi-volume history entitled The Invasion of Crimea: Its Origin, and an Account of its Progress down to the Death of Lord Raglan, published from 1863 to 1887.

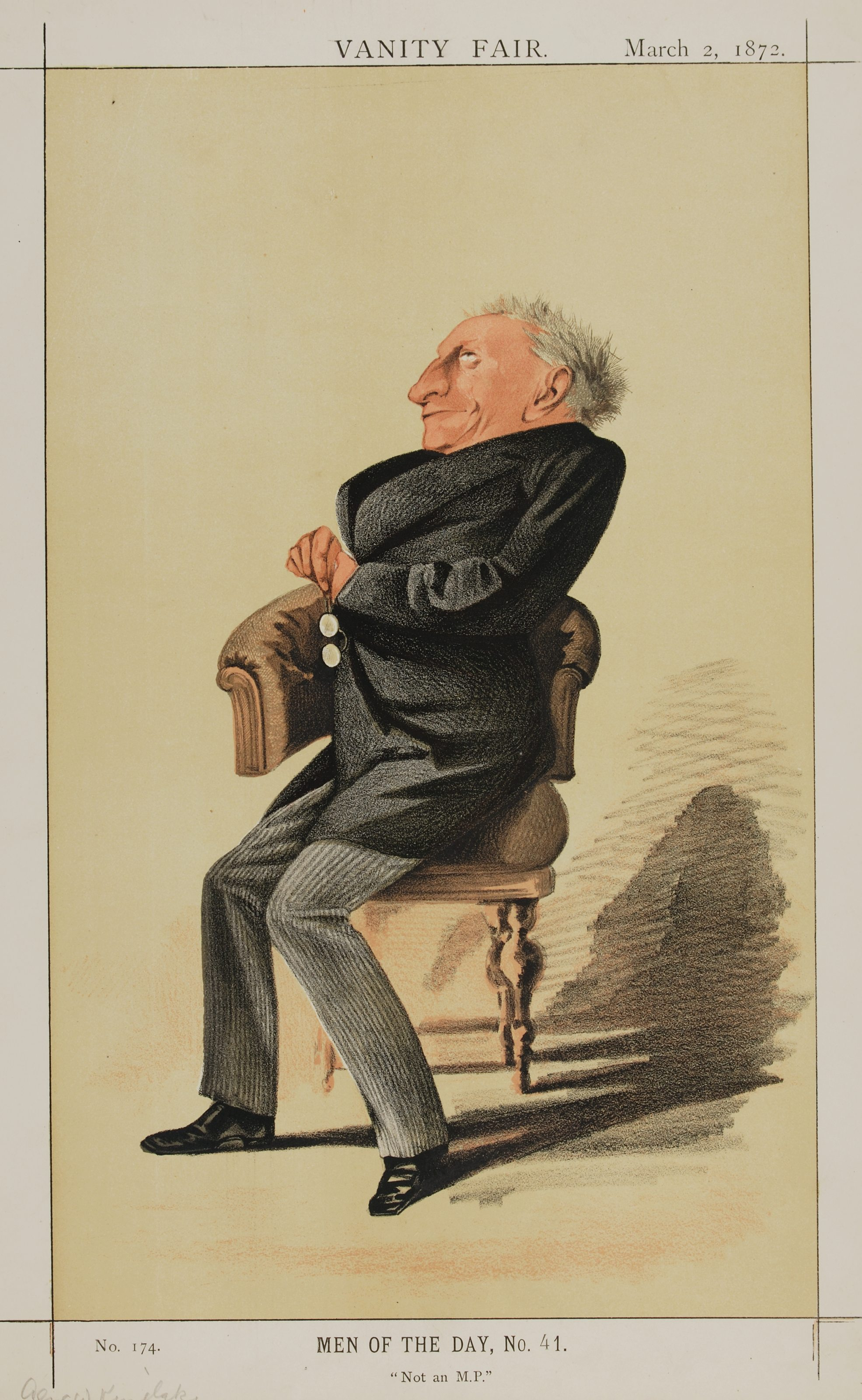
"Not an M.P." Caricature by Cecioni published in Vanity Fair, 1872

== Biography ==
Kinglake was born near Taunton, Somerset, England, and was educated at Eton College and Trinity College, Cambridge (earning a B.A. degree in 1832, and an M.A. in 1836). In 1837, he was called to the bar at Lincoln's Inn, and went on to build up a thriving legal practice, which, in 1856, he abandoned to devote himself to literature and public life.

His first literary venture was Eothen; or Traces of travel brought home from the East (London: J. Ollivier, 1844), a very popular work of Eastern travel, apparently first published anonymously, in which he described a journey he made about ten years earlier in Syria, Palestine and Egypt, together with his Eton contemporary Lord Pollington. Elliot Warburton said it evoked "the East itself in vital actual reality" and it was instantly successful.

However, Kinglake's magnum opus was The Invasion of Crimea: Its Origin, and an Account of its Progress down to the Death of Lord Raglan, in eight volumes, published from 1863 to 1887 by Blackwood in Edinburgh, one of the most effective works of its class. The history, which Geoffrey Bocca describes as a book "by which no intelligent man can fail immediately to be fascinated, no matter to what page he might open it" has been accused of being too favourable to Lord Raglan and unduly hostile to Napoleon III, for whom the author had an extreme aversion.

A Whig, Kinglake was elected at the 1857 general election as one of the two Members of Parliament (MP) for Bridgwater, having unsuccessfully contested the seat in 1852. He was returned at the next two general elections, but the result of the 1868 general election in Bridgwater was voided on petition on 26 February 1869. No by-election was held, and after a Royal Commission found that there had been extensive corruption, the town was disenfranchised in 1870.

In the late 1880s, he developed cancer of the throat, and he died on 2 January 1891.

The town of Kinglake in Victoria, Australia, and the adjacent national park, are named after him.

== Notes ==
Parliament of the United Kingdom
Preceded by Brent Follett; Charles Kemeys-Tynte	Member of Parliament for Bridgwater; 1857 – 1869; With: Charles Kemeys-Tynte to 1865; Henry Westropp 1865–1866; George Patton 1866; Philip Vanderbyl from 1866	Constituency disenfranchised
