= 1938 Oxford by-election =

1938 UK parliamentary by-election

- 27 October 1938

Oxford constituency
- Turnout: 76.3% (▲9.0 pp)
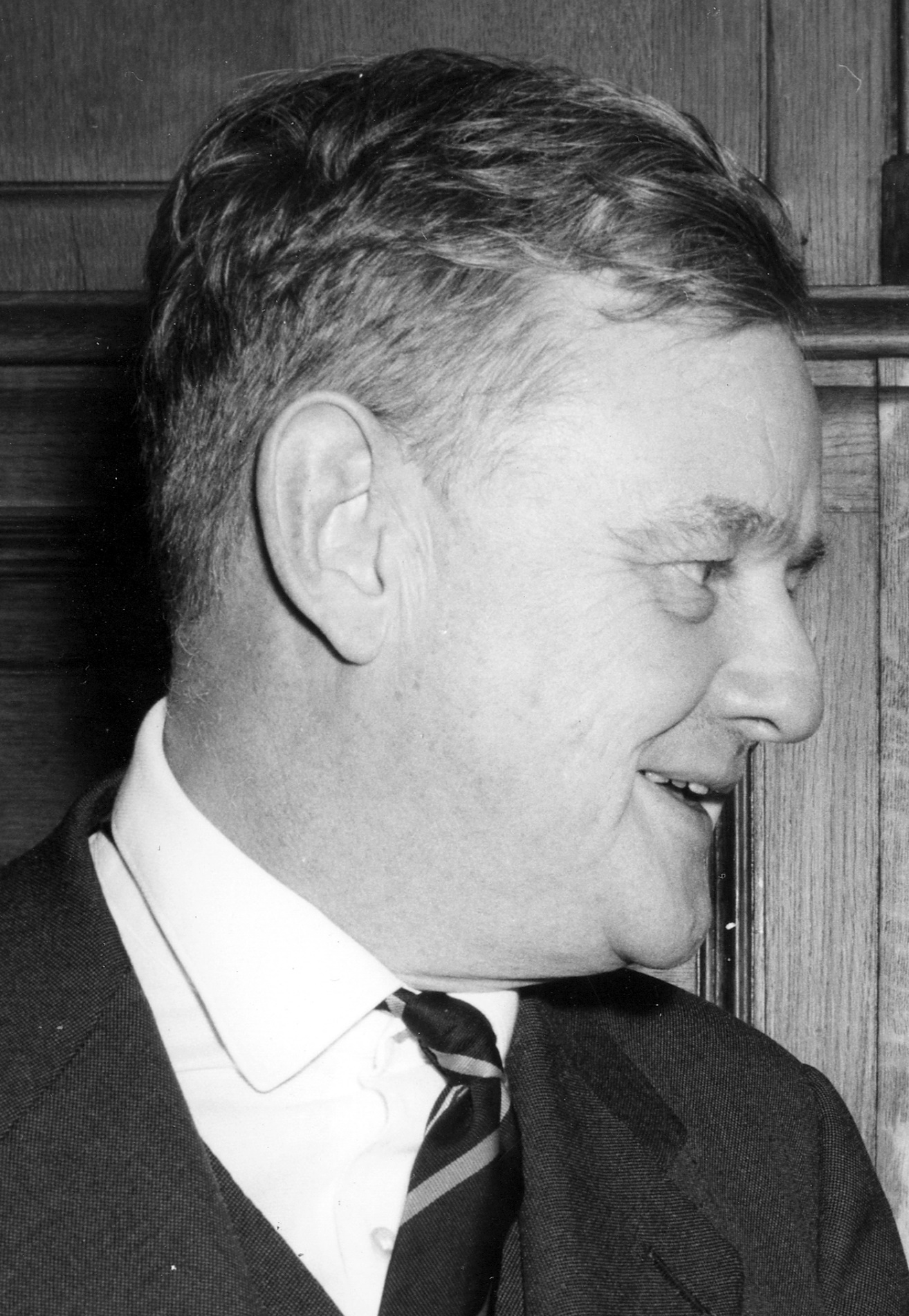
	First party	Second party
		Ind
Candidate	Quintin Hogg	Sandy Lindsay
Party	Conservative	Independent Progressive
Popular vote	15,797	12,363
Percentage	56.1%	43.9%
Swing	▼6.7 pp	New
MP before election
Robert Bourne
Conservative
Elected MP
Quintin Hogg
Conservative

The 1938 Oxford by-election was a parliamentary by-election for the British House of Commons constituency of Oxford, held on 27 October 1938. The by-election was triggered when Robert Croft Bourne, the sitting Conservative Member of Parliament died on 7 August 1938. He had served as MP for the constituency since a 1924 by-election.

== Background ==
On 29 September 1938, British Prime Minister Neville Chamberlain had signed the Munich Agreement, handing over the Sudetenland to German control. This issue polarised British politics at the time, with many Labour supporters, Liberals, and some Conservatives strongly opposed to this policy of appeasement. Many by-elections in the autumn of 1938 were fought around this issue, including this one and also the Bridgwater by-election, three weeks later, where Liberals and Labour again united in support of an Independent anti-appeasement candidate.

== Candidates ==
The Liberal Party had selected Ivor Davies, a 23-year-old graduate of Edinburgh University, despite the fact that he was the candidate for Central Aberdeenshire at the same time. The Labour Party selected Patrick Gordon Walker, who had contested the seat at the 1935 general election.

On 13 September, Davies offered to stand down from the by-election if Labour did the same and backed a Popular Front candidate against the Conservatives. Eventually, Gordon Walker reluctantly stood down and both parties supported Sandy Lindsay, who was the Master of Balliol, as an Independent Progressive.

On 14 September, the Conservatives selected Quintin Hogg, who was a fellow of All Souls and a former President of the Oxford Union Society.

== Campaign ==
The campaign was intense and focused almost entirely on foreign affairs. Hogg supported Chamberlain's appeasement policy. Lindsay opposed appeasement; his campaigners used the slogan "A vote for Hogg is a vote for Hitler."

Lindsay was supported by many dissident Conservatives such as Harold Macmillan who were opposed to the Munich Agreement. A number of future politicians such as Edward Heath and Roy Jenkins, at the University of Oxford at the time, cut their teeth in the Michaelmas campaign.

== In popular culture ==
A 1988 TV drama-documentary A Vote for Hitler dramatized the events surrounding the by-election, and included interviews with Denis Healey and Frank Pakenham, 7th Earl of Longford, who had campaigned for Labour during the election, and Quintin Hogg, by then Lord Hailsham of St Marylebone. Actors played their younger versions and included John Woodvine as Lindsay, and James Coombes as Richard Crossman.

The by-election forms the basis of part 'XIV' of poet Louis MacNeice's masterwork, Autumn Journal, which he wrote in the autumn of 1938 strongly influenced by the shadow of impending war. The persona in part 'XIV' apparently campaigns for Lindsay: "use your legs and leave a blank for Hogg / And put a cross for Lindsay".

== Result ==
The intensive campaign caused turnout to increase from 67.3% at the last election to 76.3%. Hogg won the seat with a reduced majority of 3,434 or 12.2 points.

Oxford by-election, 1938
Party	Candidate	Votes	%	±%
Conservative	Quintin Hogg	15,797	56.1	−6.7
Independent Progressive	Sandy Lindsay	12,363	43.9	New
Majority		3,434	12.2	−13.4
Turnout		28,160	76.3	+9.0
Conservative hold		Swing	-25.3	

== Previous election ==
1935 general election: Oxford
Party	Candidate	Votes	%	±%
Conservative	Robert Bourne	16,306	62.8	N/A
Labour	Patrick Gordon-Walker	9,661	37.2	New
Majority		6,645	25.6	N/A
Turnout		25,967	67.3	N/A
Conservative hold		Swing		

Notwithstanding his pro-appeasement campaign, Hogg would subsequently vote against Neville Chamberlain in the Norway Debate of May 1940.
