= Henry Westropp =

Henry Westropp MP

Member of Parliament for Bridgwater
- In office 12 July 1865 – 25 April 1866 Serving with Alexander William Kinglake
- Preceded by: Alexander William Kinglake; Charles Kemeys-Tynte
- Succeeded by: Alexander William Kinglake; George Patton

Personal details
- Born: 1811
- Died: 1886 (aged 75)
- Party: Conservative

Henry Westropp (1811–1886) was a British Conservative politician.

Westropp first stood for election at Bridgwater in 1859 but was unsuccessful. He was, however, elected at the next election in 1865, but after scrutiny his election was declared void in 1866 and he was unseated. Although he stood again in 1868, he was unsuccessful.

Parliament of the United Kingdom
Preceded by Alexander William Kinglake; Charles Kemeys-Tynte	Member of Parliament for Bridgwater; 1865 – 1866; With: Alexander William Kinglake	Succeeded by Alexander William Kinglake; George Patton
