= Ashley Fox =

British politician (born 1969)

Sir Ashley Fox MP
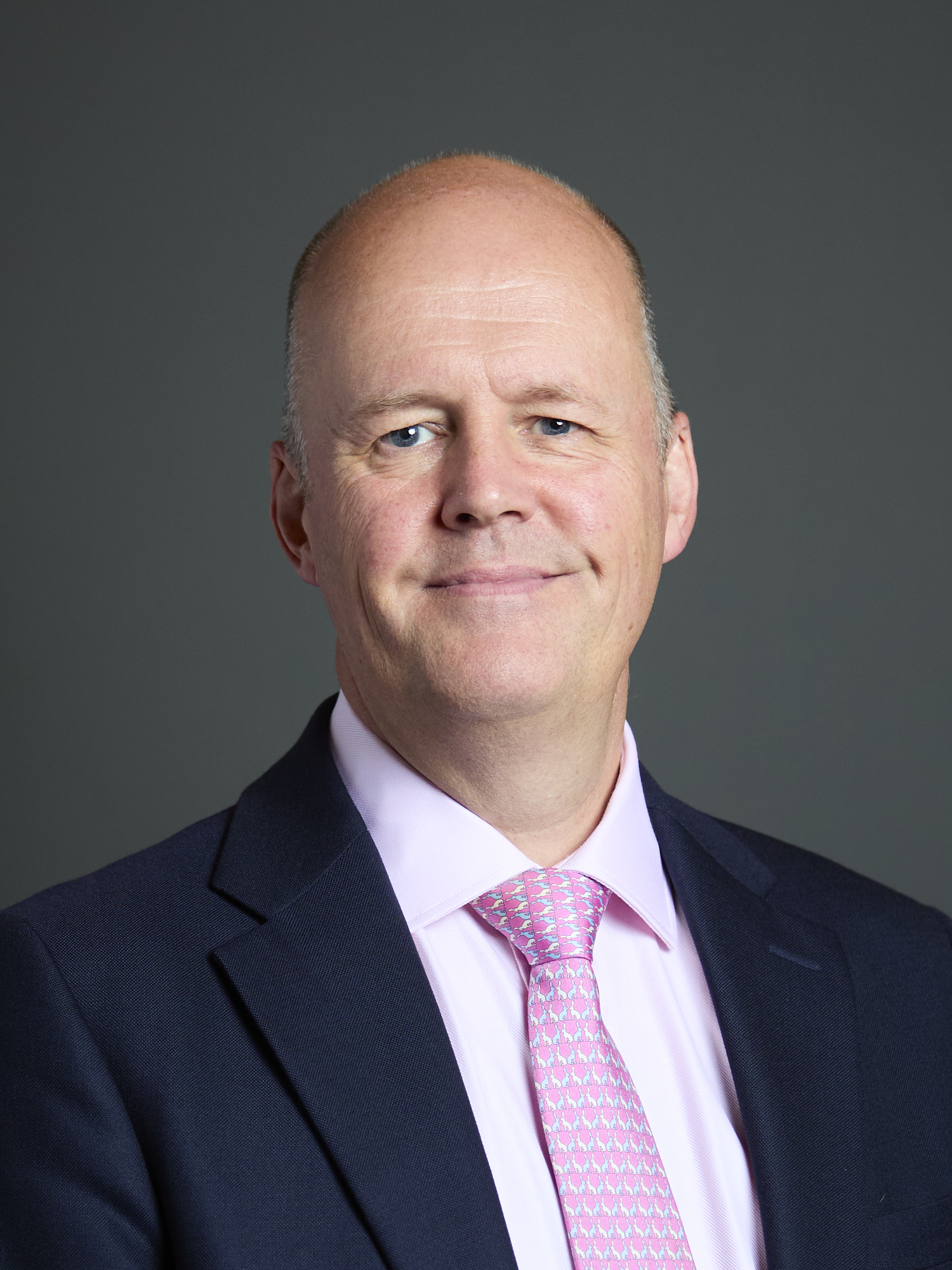
- Official portrait, 2024

Shadow Parliamentary Under-Secretary for Energy Security and Net Zero
- Incumbent
- Assumed office 31 August 2026
- Leader: Kemi Badenoch
- Preceded by: Greg Smith

Member of Parliament for Bridgwater
- Incumbent
- Assumed office 4 July 2024
- Preceded by: Constituency re-established
- Majority: 1,349 (3.4%)

Member of the European Parliament for South West England
- In office 14 July 2009 – 1 July 2019
- Preceded by: Caroline Jackson
- Succeeded by: Caroline Voaden

Leader of the Conservatives in the European Parliament
- In office 25 November 2014 – 11 June 2019
- Preceded by: Syed Kamall
- Succeeded by: Geoffrey Van Orden

Bristol City Council Councillor for Westbury on Trym
- In office 2 May 2002 – 6 May 2010
- Preceded by: David Poole

Personal details
- Born: 15 November 1969 (age 56) Sutton Coldfield, Warwickshire, England
- Party: Conservative
- Spouse(s): Julia, Lady Fox
- Children: 2
- Education: Bristol Polytechnic
- Occupation: Politician, formerly Solicitor
- Website: Official website

Sir Ashley Peter Fox (born 15 November 1969) is a British Conservative Party politician who has been the Member of Parliament for Bridgwater since July 2024. He was previously a Member of the European Parliament (MEP) for South West England and Gibraltar, and was leader of the Conservatives in the European Parliament from 2014 to 2019.

== Life and history ==
Educated at The King's School, Worcester, Fox studied law at Bristol Polytechnic before working for a year as an English assistant in France. He took his solicitors finals at Chester College of Law. After completing his articles, he qualified as a solicitor in 1994.

Before being elected as an MEP, Fox worked for 15 years as a solicitor in Bristol, specialising in insurance litigation. He was a partner at Badhams Thompson and an associate at Morgan Cole.

From 1998 to 2000, Fox was chairman of Bristol West Conservative Association. He stood as the Conservative candidate for Bath at the General Election in 2001, finishing second with 29.1% of the vote. In 2002, he was elected as councillor for Westbury-on-Trym on Bristol City Council, a position he held for 8 years.

He was appointed a Knight Bachelor in Theresa May's resignation honours on 10 September 2019.

Fox lives in Bristol with his wife and two children.

== In the European Parliament ==
Fox was first elected to the European Parliament in 2009 and was re-elected in 2014 before losing his seat in 2019. Fox served as Chief Whip of the European Conservative & Reformists Group (ECR) 2010–2014 before being elected Leader of the British Conservative Delegation in November 2014 – a position he held until the end of his term.

In his first mandate (2009–14), Fox served on the Economic & Monetary Affairs, Internal Market and Constitutional Affairs Committees. In his second mandate (2014–19) he served on the Industry, Research & Energy, Economic & Monetary Affairs, and the Constitutional Affairs Committees.

He was the leading British campaigner in the "One Seat Campaign". This was a crossparty effort to scrap the expensive practice of the European Parliament moving from Brussels to Strasbourg every month.

As part of this campaign, he co-authored the Fox-Hafner report which received widespread support and changed the official position of the Parliament in favour of having a single seat in Brussels. This will require a change to the European Treaties the next time they are up for review. In 2011–12, Fox was rapporteur on Corporate Governance in Financial Institutions.

In 2016, he was the shadow rapporteur for Energy Efficiency Labeling.

In 2018, Fox was the rapporteur on the Crowdfunding Report.

His final report in January 2019 was on the need for a Comprehensive European Industrial Policy on Artificial Intelligence and Robotics.

During his time in Parliament Fox campaigned on numerous issues and helped steer legislation through the Parliament.

- He supported efforts to encourage the development of new financial technologies such as block chain and fintech.
- He was a vocal supporter on free trade, voting in favour of Trade Deals between the European Union and other bodies such as Canada, South Korea and Japan.
- He opposed efforts to increase the European Union Budget believing that the EU needed to show fiscal responsibility rather than continually demand more money from Member States.
- He argued against the gradual creep of European Union sovereignty, in particular he opposed efforts by the European Union to be granted ‘Tax Setting Powers.
- He has campaigned on numerous animal welfare causes such as against puppy smuggling and has supported the Dogs Trust UK as well as BirdLife Malta in its campaign against the hunting of migrating birds.

He was Chairman of the European Parliament Innovation Group 2017–19.

== In the South West and Gibraltar ==
Fox was active across the South West on a wide range of issues – from farming and environmental to industrial and business.

He supported the region's cider makers against attempts by the European Union to levy additional taxes on small scale cider producers.

Similarly he supported residents in North Somerset against plans by the Environment Agency to move the sea defences a mile inland to create salt marshes and mudflats between Clevedon and Kewstoke. This would have led to the deliberate flooding of prime agricultural land.

He opposed plans to build an offshore wind farm off the Jurassic Coast in Dorset on the grounds that it would have damaged the local tourist industry. The proposal was finally rejected by the UK Government. Fox was one of the most vocal opponents.

He pushed for reform of the Common Fisheries Policy and supported efforts to help the region's fishing industry.

Fox regularly visited Gibraltar to meet with representatives of the Government, business community and the public.

== Since 2019 ==
Fox resigned as chair of the Independent Monitoring Authority for the Citizens' Rights Agreements on the 11 September 2023. The same month he was selected as the Conservative prospective parliamentary candidate for Bridgwater at the 2024 general election. He had been endorsed by former Bridgwater MP and cabinet minister Lord King. He was elected in the election with a reduced majority of 1,349 votes.

Parliament of the United Kingdom
Preceded by Ian Liddell-Grainger	Member of Parliament for Bridgwater; 2024–present	Incumbent
