= Robert Molyns =

English politician

Member of Parliament for Bridgwater
- In office 1554–1559

Personal details
- Born: c. 1515
- Died: 1574
- Spouse: Ellen Halworthie
- Relations: Michael Molyns (half-brother)
- Parent(s): William Molyns and Evelyn Walrond
- Occupation: Politician

Robert Molyns (c. 1515 – 1574), of Bridgwater, Somerset, was an English politician.

== Family ==
He was the son of William Molyns of Sandall or Sandhills, Hants by his wife Evelyn, daughter of William Walrond of Bovey House, near Seaton, Devon. He married Ellen Halworthie, daughter of Thomas Halworthie. He was the half-brother of Michael Molyns.

== Career ==
He was the Bailiff for Bridgewater from 1544 to 1945 and from 1550 to 1551. He was mayor of Bridgewater from 1555 to 1557. He was a Member (MP) of the Parliament of England for Bridgwater in 1554, 1558 and 1559. He received wages for 64 days during the 1559 Parliament and for expenses incurred passing an act regarding Bridgewater cloth.

His will was proved Oct 8 1574. He left £60 to the poor, made bequests to his servants and bequeathed the residue to his wife, the sole executrix.
