= Vernon Bartlett =

British journalist and politician

Vernon Bartlett in 1932

Charles Vernon Oldfeld Bartlett, CBE (30 April 1894 – 18 January 1983) was an English journalist, politician and author. He served as a Member of Parliament (MP) from 1938 to 1950: first as an Independent Progressive advocating a Popular Front, then for the Common Wealth Party, and then again as an Independent Progressive.

== Life ==
Born at Westbury, Wiltshire, the son of T. O. Bartlett, the young Bartlett was educated at Blundell's School, then joined the British Army during the First World War, from which he was invalided out. He became a journalist, working for the Daily Mail, and later was a foreign correspondent for The Times. In 1922, he was appointed director of the London office of the League of Nations, after which he worked as a news reporter for BBC radio. He did not have his BBC contract renewed after his coverage of Hitler's decision to leave the League of Nations in 1933 was deemed too sympathetic ("not beastly enough"). In 1933, he joined the News Chronicle and was its diplomatic correspondent for twenty years, including a period in Spain during the Spanish Civil War.

Bartlett was elected to the House of Commons for the Somerset seat of Bridgwater as a Popular Front candidate opposed to appeasement in a by-election held on 18 November 1938. He held the seat for twelve years.

In 1942, Bartlett, Richard Acland, J. B. Priestley, and others established the socialist Common Wealth Party. At the 1945 election, Bartlett held his Bridgwater seat, standing as an Independent. In 1950, he joined the Labour Party and retired from parliament.

In 1954, Bartlett also retired from his work with the News Chronicle and moved to Singapore, where he was both political commentator for The Straits Times and also South East Asia correspondent for The Manchester Guardian.

== Personal life ==
Bartlett married firstly Marguerite van den Bemden, and they had two sons. After her death in 1966, he married secondly in 1969 Eleanor Needham Ritchie.

== Publications ==
- Calf Love, 1929
- Journey's End: a novel (with R. C. Sherriff), 1930
- Nazi Germany Explained, 1933
- If I Were Dictator, 1935 (contributor to Methuen & Co. LTD series)
- This is My Life, 1937
- Tomorrow Always Comes, 1943
- East of the Iron Curtain, 1950
- Struggle for Africa, 1953
- You and your surfboard, 1953
- And Now, Tomorrow, 1960
- Tuscan Retreat, 1964
- A Book about Elba, 1965
- Introduction to Italy, 1967
- The Past of Pastimes, 1969
- The Colour of their Skin, 1969
- Tuscan Harvest, 1971
- Central Italy, 1972
- Northern Italy, 1973
- I Know What I Liked, 1974

Parliament of the United Kingdom
Preceded by Reginald Croom-Johnson	Member of Parliament for Bridgwater; 1938–1950	Succeeded by Sir Gerald Wills
