= William Morse (British politician) =

British politician

William Ewart Morse

William Ewart Morse (23 November 1878 – 18 December 1952) was an English businessman and Liberal Party politician, briefly Member of Parliament for Bridgwater and later a member of Wiltshire County Council.

== Family and education ==
Morse was the son of Levi Lapper Morse, a prominent Swindon shopkeeper and the Liberal Member of Parliament for the Wilton or South Division of Wiltshire from 1906 to 1910. He was educated at the High School, Swindon. In 1910 he married Alma the daughter of Hawthorn Thornton of South Africa, a civil engineer. They appear to have two sons and a daughter. Their second son, Stanley, was killed on active service with the Royal Air Force Volunteer Reserve in 1941.

== Career ==
Morse was a director of a limited company and a leading businessman in Swindon. His wife owned Croft Down Kennels, which bred at least one champion dog. He served as President of Swindon Chamber of Commerce and was a Freemason for 40 years, Past Master of the Royal Sussex Lodge of Emulation, 355 and held the office of Provincial Grand Standard Bearer.

== Religion ==
Morse, like his father, was a lifelong member of the Primitive Methodist Church. In 1923 he was one of three Primitive Methodists chosen to represent his denomination on the British Council of the World Alliance for Promoting International Friendship through the Churches. He was elected vice-president of the Primitive Methodist Church for 1925–26.

== Politics ==
=== Local politics ===
Morse followed his father's path in politics as in religion, perhaps prompted by his given forenames. In local politics, Morse was a member of Swindon Town Council for 20 years. He was chairman of the finance committee, an alderman and served as mayor of Swindon for two years. Morse was also elected to Wiltshire County Council and sat for 30 years on that authority. He also served as a justice of the jeace and was chairman of one of Swindon's three rotas of justices.

=== Parliament ===
Morse first stood for Parliament at the 1922 general election in the Bridgwater Division of Somerset. He narrowly failed to defeat the sitting Conservative MP, Sir Robert Sanders, losing by 119 votes in a three-cornered contest. The Labour candidate, T. S. B. Williams, came in third place losing his deposit. Morse was Liberal candidate again in Bridgewater at the 1923 general election. This time he gained the seat from Sanders in a straight fight by a majority of 1,431 votes. He fought the seat again in 1924, this time in another three-cornered contest. Sanders had announced he would not fight the Bridgwater Division again after his defeat and stood down as Tory candidate. He had been replaced for the Tories by Brooks Crompton Wood. The Labour Party was represented by a local trade union official, and a former Liberal Party worker, Mr J M Boltz. Boltlz's intervention threatened to split the anti-Tory vote depriving Morse, who was said to be a strong candidate, of a seat he was otherwise predicted to hold. Boltz gained 1,966 votes and Labour again forfeited their deposit. Wood took the seat from Morse by a majority of 3,441.

In the 1929 general election Morse switched Somerset constituencies, this time standing for the seaside seat of Weston-Super-Mare. In a three-cornered contest in which the Labour candidate Constance Borrett lost her deposit, Morse came second to the sitting Conservative MP Lord Erskine losing by 5,679 votes. He did not stand for Parliament again.

== Death ==
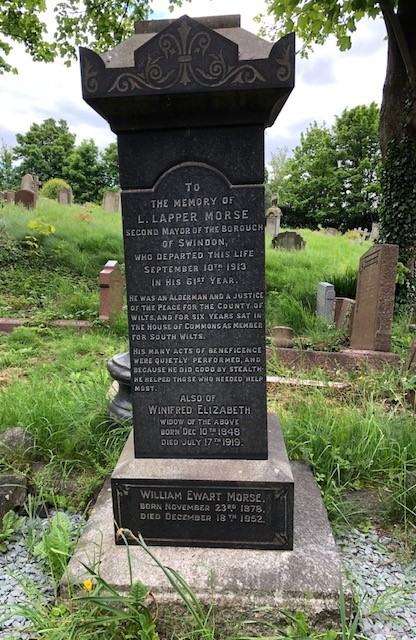
Memorial in Radnor Streer Cemetery with inscription to William Ewart Morse at the bottom.

Morse died on 18 December 1952 at the age of 74 years.

There is an inscription to him on his father's memorial in Radnor Street Cemetery in Swindon.

Parliament of the United Kingdom
Preceded by Sir Robert Sanders, Bt	Member of Parliament for Bridgwater; 1923 – 1924	Succeeded by Brooks Wood
