= Edward Stanley (Bridgwater MP) =

British politician

Stanley in 1895

Edward James Stanley DL JP (16 December 1826 – 29 September 1907), was a British Conservative politician who sat in the House of Commons from 1882 to 1906.

Stanley was the son of Edward Stanley, of Cross Hall, Lancashire, a deputy lieutenant and justice of the peace for that county, and his wife Lady Mary Maitland, daughter of James Maitland, 8th Earl of Lauderdale. He was educated at Eton College and Christ Church, Oxford. He was a deputy lieutenant and justice of the peace for both Somerset and Lancashire and was High Sheriff of Somerset in 1880.

Stanley was elected member of parliament for Somerset West at a by-election in 1882 and held the seat until it was reorganised under the Redistribution of Seats Act 1885. At the 1885 general election he was elected MP for Bridgwater and held the seat until he retired from the House of Commons in 1906 at the age of 79.

Stanley died in September 1907, aged 80.

In 1872 Stanley married the Hon. Mary Dorothy Labouchere, daughter of Henry Labouchere, 1st Baron Taunton and heir to the Quantock Lodge estate. His wife survived him by thirteen years and died in March 1920.

Stanley's branch of the Stanley family descended from Peter Stanley (d. c. 1686), younger son of Sir Thomas Stanley, 2nd Baronet, whose elder son Sir Edward Stanley, 3rd Baronet, was the ancestor of the branch of the family that have held the earldom of Derby since 1736.

== Notes ==
Parliament of the United Kingdom
Preceded by Vaughan Vaughan-Lee; Mordaunt Bisset	Member of Parliament for Somerset West; 1882–1885; With: Mordaunt Bisset 1882–1884; Charles Elton 1884–1885	Constituency abolished
New constituency Borough of the same name disenfranchised 1870	Member of Parliament for Bridgwater; 1885–1906	Succeeded by Henry Montgomery
