= Brooks Wood =

British politician (1870–1946)

Brooks Crompton Wood (27 March 1870 – 29 July 1946) was a British Conservative Party politician who sat in the House of Commons from 1924 to 1929 as the Member of Parliament (MP) for Bridgwater.

Parliament of the United Kingdom
Preceded by William Morse	Member of Parliament for Bridgwater; 1924 – 1929	Succeeded by Reginald Croom-Johnson
