= Reginald Croom-Johnson =

British barrister, judge and Conservative Member of Parliament

Croom-Johnson in 1928

Sir Reginald Powell Croom-Johnson (27 July 1879 – 29 December 1957) was a British barrister, judge, and Conservative Member of Parliament for Bridgwater. He was a noted philatelist with a specialist collection of the stamps of the British Solomon Islands.

== Biography ==
Reginald Croom-Johnson was born at Clifton, Bristol, on 27 July 1879 to Oliver Croom-Johnson (1854–1925), of 36, St John's Road, Clifton, a director of a grain warehousing company, and his wife Agnes Emma Jane (née White). He was educated at Bristol Cathedral School and London University (LLB).

Croom-Johnson began his career as a solicitor in 1901. He was called to the bar, Inner Temple, in 1907 and appointed Kings Counsel in 1927. He was recorder of Bath 1928–38. From October 1938 to January 1954, he was a judge in the King's Bench Division of the High Court of Justice. Later, he was a justice of the peace for Somerset and deputy chairman of the Quarter Sessions.

During the First World War he assisted in raising the Old Boys' Corps. He was a lieutenant in the King's Own Yorkshire Light Infantry and subsequently attached to the Judge Advocate-General's Department for special services in connection with the Mesopotamia Commission.

In 1929, he was elected the Conservative Member of Parliament (MP) for Bridgwater. In 1938, he resigned his seat after being appointed a justice of the High Court. His resignation precipitated the 1938 Bridgwater by-election.

Croom-Johnson died at age 78 at his home, Hillbrook House, at Trull, near Taunton, Somerset, on 29 December 1957.

== Family ==
He married Ruby Ernestine, daughter of Edwin Ernest Hobbs, in 1909; they had three sons, the second of whom, Oliver Powell Croom-Johnson, was killed on active service in 1940, the youngest son being Sir David Powell Croom-Johnson (1914-2000), who served as a Lord Justice of Appeal from 1984 to 1989.

== Other activities ==
Croom-Johnson was a noted philatelist with a specialised collection of the stamps of the British Solomon Islands and wrote a book on that subject that was published in 1927. He also wrote a hobby guide to stamp collecting. While still a junior barrister, he represented Jonas Lek in 1926 in his claim against his insurers for items lost from a valuable stamp collection.

Croom-Johnson was the chairman of the original committee for the foundation of Stowe School and wrote a book about its origins that was published in 1953. He was a member of the Carlton and Garrick clubs. He was a member of the council of the Men of the Trees.

== Selected publications ==
- Postage-Stamp Collecting ... Illustrated. Bazaar, Exchange & Mart, London, 1923.
- Stamps of the British Solomon Islands (les timbres-poste des Iles Salomon). Editrice Filatelica (Collana di Pubblicazioni Filateliche 16), Turin, 1928.
- The origin of Stowe School. W.S. Cowell, Ipswich & London, 1953.

Parliament of the United Kingdom
Preceded by Brooks Wood	Member of Parliament for Bridgwater; 1929–1938	Succeeded by Vernon Bartlett
