= Bridgwater (constituency) =

UK Parliament constituency (1885–2010, 2024 onwards)

- County constituency for the House of Commons
- Boundary of Bridgwater in South West England
- County: Somerset
- Electorate: 71,418 (2023)
- Major settlements: Bridgwater, Burnham-on-Sea, Highbridge, North Petherton

Current constituency
- Created: 2024
- Member of Parliament: Ashley Fox (Conservative)
- Created from: Bridgwater & West Somerset

1885–2010
- Seats: One
- Type of constituency: County constituency
- Created from: West Somerset
- Replaced by: Bridgwater & West Somerset

1295–1870
- Seats: Two
- Type of constituency: Borough constituency
- Replaced by: West Somerset

Bridgwater is a parliamentary constituency represented in the House of Commons of the Parliament of the United Kingdom since 2024 by Ashley Fox of the Conservative Party. It elects one Member of Parliament (MP) by the first past the post system of election.

From 2010 to 2024 it was replaced by the Bridgwater and West Somerset constituency. Further to the completion of the 2023 review of Westminster constituencies, the seat has been re-established for the 2024 general election, primarily formed from the now abolished of Bridgwater and West Somerset seat but excluding the area comprising the former District of West Somerset.

== Constituency profile ==
The Bridgwater constituency is located in Somerset and is largely within the Somerset Levels, a coastal plain and wetland area. It is centred on the town of Bridgwater, which has a population of around 41,000. It covers the rural areas around the town and stretches north to include part of the Bristol Channel coast. Other settlements in the constituency include the towns of Burnham-on-Sea and Highbridge and many other smaller villages. Bridgwater is a historic market town and was traditionally an important inland port. The coastal area of the constituency is popular with tourists and Burnham-on-Sea is a seaside resort.

Compared to national averages, residents of the constituency are older and have low levels of income, education and professional employment. Bridgwater and Highbridge have areas with high levels of deprivation, but the rural areas of the constituency are generally wealthier. White people make up 96% of the population. Bridgwater is one of the few areas in Somerset to be represented by Labour Party councillors at the county council, whilst the rural parts of the constituency have mostly elected Conservatives. Voters strongly supported leaving the European Union at the 2016 Brexit referendum; an estimated 64% voted in favour of Brexit compared to 52% nationally.

== History ==
Bridgwater was one of the original Parliamentary Constituencies in the House of Commons, having elected Members of Parliament since 1295, the Model Parliament.

The original borough constituency was disenfranchised for corruption by the Bridgwater and Beverley Disfranchisement Act 1870 (33 & 34 Vict. c. 21). From 4 July 1870 the town was incorporated within the county constituency of West Somerset.

From Parliament's enactment of the major Redistribution of Seats Act 1885 which took effect at the 1885 general election, a new county division of Bridgwater was created, which lasted with modifications until 2010. The constituency expanded considerably beyond Bridgwater town itself from 1885.

Bridgwater frequently compared to other seats had a radical or game-changing representative, though since 1950 this became less noticeable in its candidates elected.

The seat received particular fame in late 1938 when a by-election took place in the aftermath of the signing of the Munich Agreement. Opponents of the agreement persuaded the local Labour and Liberal parties to not field candidates of their own against the Conservative candidate, but to instead jointly back an independent standing on a platform of opposition to the Government's foreign policy, in the hope that this would be the precursor to the formation of a more general Popular Front of opposition to the government of Neville Chamberlain in anticipation of the General Election due in either 1939 or 1940. The noted journalist Vernon Bartlett stood as the independent Popular Front candidate and achieved a sensational victory in what was hitherto a Conservative seat. He represented the constituency for the next twelve years.

In 1970 another by-election in the constituency achieved fame as it was the first occasion when 18-, 19- and 20-year-olds were able to vote in a UK Parliamentary election. The first teenager to cast a vote was Trudy Sellick, 18 on the day of the poll. The by-election was won by the future Conservative Cabinet Minister Tom King who held the seat for the next thirty-one years, followed by another Conservative, Ian Liddell-Grainger, until its abolition in 2010.

Liddell-Grainger served as the MP for Bridgwater and West Somerset from 2010 to 2024, but opted to stand at the 2024 general election for the new seat of Tiverton and Minehead, which he failed to win. Ashley Fox was selected as the Conservative candidate for the re-established constituency, which he narrowly won.

== Boundaries ==
=== Historic ===
Bridgwater within Somerset in 2005

1885–1918: The Municipal Borough of Bridgwater, the Sessional Division of Bridgwater, and parts of the Sessional Divisions of Taunton and Ilminster.

1918–1950: The Municipal Borough of Bridgwater, the Urban Districts of Burnham-on-Sea, Highbridge, Minehead, and Watchet, and the Rural Districts of Bridgwater and Williton.

1950–1983: The Municipal Borough of Bridgwater, the Urban Districts of Burnham-on-Sea, Minehead, and Watchet, and the Rural Districts of Bridgwater and Williton. Highbridge Urban District had been absorbed by Burnham-on-Sea UD in 1933, but the constituency boundaries remained unchanged.

1983–2010: The District of Sedgemoor wards of Cannington and Combwich, Central, Dowsborough, Eastern Quantocks, Eastover, East Poldens, Hamp, Huntspill, Newton Green, North Petherton, Parchey, Pawlett and Puriton, Quantock, Sandford, Sowey, Sydenham, Victoria, Westonzoyland, West Poldens, and Woolavington, and the District of West Somerset wards of Alcombe, Aville Vale, Carhampton and Withycombe, Crowcombe and Stogumber, Dunster, East Brendon, Holnicote, Minehead North, Minehead South, Old Cleeve, Porlock and Oare, Quantock Vale, Watchet, West Quantock, and Williton.

=== Current ===
Map of boundaries from 2024

Under the 2023 review of Westminster constituencies, the re-established constituency was defined as being composed of the following as they existed on 1 December 2020:

- The District of Sedgemoor wards of: Berrow; Bridgwater Dunwear; Bridgwater Eastover; Bridgwater Fairfax; Bridgwater Hamp; Bridgwater Victoria; Bridgwater Westover; Bridgwater Wyndham; Burnham Central; Burnham North; Cannington and Wembdon; Highbridge and Burnham Marine; Huntspill and Pawlett; King's Isle; North Petherton; Puriton and Woolavington; Quantocks.

With effect from 1 April 2023, the District of Sedgemoor was abolished and absorbed into the new unitary authority of Somerset. Consequently, the constituency now comprises the following electoral divisions of Somerset from the 2024 general election:

- Brent (part); Bridgwater East and Bawdrip; Bridgwater North and Central; Bridgwater South; Bridgwater West; Burnham on Sea North; Cannington; Highbridge and Burnham South; Huntspill (majority); King Alfred (small part); North Petherton.

It comprises:

- The bulk of the parts of the former District of Sedgemoor in the abolished Bridgwater and West Somerset constituency (74% of the electorate), mainly consisting of the town of Bridgwater itself.
- Burnham-on-Sea and Highbridge, previously in the now abolished constituency of Wells.

== Members of Parliament ==
- Constituency created (1295)

=== Bridgwater borough, 1295–1870 ===
==== MPs 1295–1640 ====
Parliament	First member	Second member
1377	William Tomer	John Sydenham
1380 (Jan)	William Tomer	
1383 (Oct)	William Tomer	
1385	William Tomer	
1386	John Sydenham	Richard Mayne
1388 (Feb)	John Sydenham	Richard Mayne
1388 (Sep)	John Palmer	John Wynd
1390 (Jan)	William Tomer	John Palmer
1390 (Nov)		
1391	William Tomer	John Sydenham
1393	William Tomer	Robert Boson
1394	John Cole	John Palmer
1395	William Tomer	John Kedwelly
1397 (Jan)	William Tomer	John Kedwelly
1397 (Sep)	William Tomer	John Sydenham
1399	William Tomer	John Kedwelly
1401		
1402	William Tomer	John Kedwelly
1404 (Jan)		
1404 (Oct)		
1406	William Tomer	William Gascoigne
1407	William Gascoigne	Richard Ward
1410	William Gascoigne	John Kedwelly
1411		
1413 (Feb)		
1413 (May)	William Gascoigne	William Gosse
1414 (Apr)	William Gascoigne	Thomas Cave
1414 (Nov)	William Gascoigne	John Kedwelly
1415		
1416 (Mar)		
1416 (Oct)		
1417	William Gascoigne	John Kedwelly
1419	William Gascoigne	Richard Mayne
1420	William Gascoigne	Martin Jacob
1421 (May)	James FitzJames	William Gascoigne
1421 (Dec)	William Gascoigne	John Pitt
1442	William Dodesham	William Gascoigne
1449	Thomas Driffield	John Maunsel
1453	John Maunsel	
1467	James FitzJames	
1467	John Kendall (4 terms)	
1472	Sir Thomas Tremayle	
1483	John Hymerford	William Hody
1510–1523	No names known	
1529	Henry Thornton	Hugh Trotter
1536	?	
1539	?	
1542	?	
1545	Thomas Dyer	Alexander Popham
1547	Sir Thomas Dyer	Alexander Popham
1553 (Mar)	Sir Thomas Dyer	Richard Gubby
1553 (Oct)	Sir Thomas Dyer	Nicholas Halswell
1554 (Apr)	John Newport	Robert Molyns (or Mullens)
1554 (Nov)	John Newport	John Chapell
1555	Thomas Dyer	Edmund Lyte
1558	John Newport	Robert Molyns (or Mullens)
1559	Sir Thomas Dyer	Robert Molyns (or Mullens)
1563–1567	John Edwards	Nicholas Halswell
1571	John Edwards	Edward Popham
1572–1581	John Edwards	Edward Popham
1584–1585	Robert Blake	Edward Popham
Parliament of 1586–1587	Robert Blake	John Court
Parliament of 1588–1589	Robert Blake	Alexander Popham
1593	Robert Bocking	William Thomas
1597–1598	Alexander Jones	Alexander Popham
1601	Sir Francis Hastings	Alexander Popham
1604–1611	Sir Nicholas Halswell	John Povey
Addled Parliament (1614)	Robert Halswell	Thomas Warre
1621–1622	Roger Warre	Edward Popham
Happy Parliament (1624–1625)	Roger Warre	Edward Popham
Useless Parliament (1625)	Sir Arthur Lake	Edward Popham
1625–1626	Sir Arthur Lake	Edward Popham
1628	Thomas Smith	Sir Thomas Wroth
1629–1640	No Parliament summoned	

==== 1640–1868 ====
Year	First member	First party	Second member	Second party
April 1640	Robert Blake		Edmund Wyndham	Royalist
November 1640	Sir Peter Wroth	Parliamentarian	Edmund Wyndham	Royalist
February 1641	Sir Peter Wroth	Parliamentarian	Thomas Smith	Royalist
August 1642	Sir Peter Wroth	Parliamentarian	Smith disabled from sitting — seat vacant	
May 1644	Wroth died — seat vacant		Smith disabled from sitting — seat vacant	
1645	Admiral Robert Blake		Sir Thomas Wroth	
1653	Bridgwater was unrepresented in the Barebones Parliament			
1654	Admiral Robert Blake		Bridgwater had only one seat in the First and Second Parliaments of the Protectorate	
1656	Sir Thomas Wroth		Bridgwater had only one seat in the First and Second Parliaments of the Protectorate	
January 1659	Sir Thomas Wroth		John Wroth	
May 1659	Sir Thomas Wroth		One seat vacant	
April 1660	Sir Thomas Wroth		Francis Rolle	
1661	Edmund Wyndham		John Tynte	
November 1669	Edmund Wyndham		Sir Francis Rolle	
December 1669	Edmund Wyndham		Peregrine Palmer	
February 1679	Sir Halswell Tynte		Sir Francis Rolle	
September 1679	Sir Halswell Tynte		Ralph Stawell	
1681	Sir Halswell Tynte		Sir John Malet	
1685	Sir Halswell Tynte		Sir Francis Warre	Tory
1689	Henry Bull	Tory	Sir Francis Warre	Tory
1692	Robert Balch		Sir Francis Warre	Tory
1695	Nathaniel Palmer		Roger Hoar	
1698	George Crane		Roger Hoar	
1699	George Crane		Sir Francis Warre	Tory
January 1701	John Gilbert		George Balch	Tory
November 1701	Sir Thomas Wroth		George Balch	Tory
1708	George Dodington	Whig	George Balch	Tory
1710	George Dodington	Whig	Nathaniel Palmer	Tory
1713	John Rolle		Nathaniel Palmer	Tory
1715	George Dodington	Whig	Thomas Palmer	Tory
1720	William Pitt		Thomas Palmer	Tory
1722	George Dodington		Thomas Palmer	Tory
1727	George Dodington		Sir Halswell Tynte	Tory
1731	George Dodington		Thomas Palmer	Tory
1735	George Dodington		Charles Wyndham	Tory
1741	George Dodington		Vere Poulett	Tory
1747	George Dodington		Peregrine Poulett	Tory
1753	George Dodington		Robert Balch	Tory
1754	The Earl of Egmont		Robert Balch	Tory
1761	The Earl of Egmont		Edward Southwell	
1762	Viscount Perceval		Edward Southwell	
1763	Viscount Perceval		The Lord Coleraine	
1768	Viscount Perceval		Benjamin Allen	Whig
1769	Anne Poulett	Tory	Benjamin Allen	Whig
1781	Anne Poulett	Tory	John Acland	Tory
1784	Anne Poulett	Tory	Rear-Admiral Alexander Hood	Tory
1785	Robert Thornton		Rear-Admiral Alexander Hood	Tory
1790	Major Vere Poulett	Tory	John Langston	Tory
1796	George Pocock	Tory	Jeffreys Allen	Tory
1804	George Pocock	Tory	John Hudleston	Tory
1806	Major-General Vere Poulett	Whig	John Langston	Whig
1807	William Astell	Tory	George Pocock	Tory
1820	William Astell	Tory	Charles Kemeys-Tynte (1)	Whig
1832	William Tayleur	Whig	Charles Kemeys-Tynte (1)	Whig
1835	John Temple Leader	Radical	Charles Kemeys-Tynte (1)	Whig
May 1837	Henry Broadwood	Conservative	Charles Kemeys-Tynte (1)	Whig
August 1837	Henry Broadwood	Conservative	Philip Courtenay	Conservative
1841	Henry Broadwood	Conservative	Thomas Seaton Forman	Conservative
1847	Henry Broadwood	Conservative	Charles Kemeys-Tynte (2)	Whig
1852	Brent Follett	Conservative	Charles Kemeys-Tynte (2)	Whig
1857	Alexander William Kinglake	Whig	Charles Kemeys-Tynte (2)	Whig
1859	Alexander William Kinglake	Liberal	Charles Kemeys-Tynte (2)	Liberal
1865	Alexander William Kinglake	Liberal	Henry Westropp	Conservative
1866	Alexander William Kinglake	Liberal	George Patton	Conservative
1866	Alexander William Kinglake	Liberal	Philip Vanderbyl	Liberal
1869	Writ suspended — both seats vacant			
1870	Constituency abolished for corruption and incorporated into the West Somerset county division from 4 July 1870			

=== Bridgwater county constituency, 1885–2010; 2024–present ===
- County division created (1885)

Year	Member	Party
1885	Edward Stanley	Conservative
1906	Henry Montgomery	Liberal
1910	Sir Robert Sanders	Unionist
1923	William Morse	Liberal
1924	Brooks Wood	Unionist
1929	Reginald Croom-Johnson	Conservative
1938 by-election	Vernon Bartlett	Independent Progressive
1942	Vernon Bartlett	Common Wealth
1945	Vernon Bartlett	Independent Progressive
1950	Sir Gerald Wills	Conservative
1970 by-election	Tom King	Conservative
2001	Ian Liddell-Grainger	Conservative
2010	constituency abolished, replaced by Bridgwater and West Somerset	

- County division re-created (2024)

Election	Member	Party
2024	Ashley Fox	Conservative

== Elections ==
=== Elections in the 2020s ===
General election 2024: Bridgwater
Party	Candidate	Votes	%	±%
Conservative	Ashley Fox	12,281	30.6	−27.3
Labour	Leigh Redman	10,932	27.2	+6.5
Reform	William Fagg	8,913	22.2	New
Liberal Democrats	Claire Sully	5,781	14.4	−3.2
Green	Charlie Graham	1,720	4.3	+2.2
Independent	Pelé Barnes	334	0.8	New
Workers Party	Gregory Tanner	168	0.4	New
Majority		1,349	3.4	−33.8
Turnout		40,129	56.1	−6.9
Registered electors		71,571		
Conservative hold		Swing	−16.9	

=== Elections in the 2010s ===
2019 notional result
Party	Vote	%
Conservative	26,058	57.9
Labour	9,334	20.7
Liberal Democrats	7,932	17.6
Green	925	2.1
Others	755	1.7
Turnout	45,004	63.0
Electorate	71,418	

=== Elections in the 2000s ===
General election 2005: Bridgwater
Party	Candidate	Votes	%	±%
Conservative	Ian Liddell-Grainger	21,240	44.10	+3.70
Labour	Matthew Burchell	12,771	26.50	−0.30
Liberal Democrats	James Main	10,940	22.70	−3.50
UKIP	Raymond Weinstein	1,767	3.70	+0.90
Green	Charlie Graham	1,391	2.90	New
Majority		8,469	17.60	+7.20
Turnout		48,109	63.50	−0.90
Conservative hold		Swing	+3.60	

General election 2001: Bridgwater
Party	Candidate	Votes	%	±%
Conservative	Ian Liddell-Grainger	19,354	40.40	+3.47
Liberal Democrats	Ian Thorn	14,367	30.00	−3.65
Labour	Bill Monteith	12,803	26.80	+2.05
UKIP	Vicky Gardner	1,323	2.80	New
Majority		4,987	10.40	+7.12
Turnout		47,847	64.40	−10.01
Conservative hold		Swing	+3.56	

=== Elections in the 1990s ===
General election 1997: Bridgwater
Party	Candidate	Votes	%	±%
Conservative	Tom King	20,174	36.93	−9.83
Liberal Democrats	Michael Hoban	18,378	33.65	+3.96
Labour	Roger Lavers	13,519	24.75	+3.02
Referendum	Fran Evens	2,551	4.67	New
Majority		1,796	3.28	−13.79
Turnout		54,622	74.41	−5.11
Conservative hold		Swing	–6.89	

General election 1992: Bridgwater
Party	Candidate	Votes	%	±%
Conservative	Tom King	26,610	46.76	−4.76
Liberal Democrats	WJ Revans	16,894	29.69	−0.61
Labour	PE James	12,365	21.73	+3.54
Green	G Dummett	746	1.31	New
Independent	A Body	183	0.32	New
Natural Law	G Sanson	112	0.20	New
Majority		9,716	17.07	−4.15
Turnout		56,910	79.52	+1.34
Conservative hold		Swing	–2.07	

=== Elections in the 1980s ===
General election 1987: Bridgwater
Party	Candidate	Votes	%	±%
Conservative	Tom King	27,177	51.52	−0.74
SDP	Christopher Clarke	15,982	30.30	+0.30
Labour	John Turner	9,594	18.19	+0.45
Majority		11,195	21.22	−1.05
Turnout		52,753	78.18	+3.38
Conservative hold		Swing	–0.53	

General election 1983: Bridgwater
Party	Candidate	Votes	%	±%
Conservative	Tom King	25,107	52.26	–1.76
SDP	Rosemary Farley	14,410	30.00	+13.07
Labour	Andrew May	8,524	17.74	–11.31
Majority		10,697	22.26	–2.51
Turnout		48,041	74.80	
Conservative hold		Swing	–1.75	

=== Elections in the 1970s ===
General election 1979: Bridgwater
Party	Candidate	Votes	%	±%
Conservative	Tom King	31,259	54.0	+9.7
Labour	J Beasant	16,809	29.05	−3.8
Liberal	Christina Baron	9,793	16.9	−5.5
Majority		14,450	25.0	+13.5
Turnout		57,861	79.2	+2.0
Conservative hold		Swing	+6.4	

General election October 1974: Bridgwater
Party	Candidate	Votes	%	±%
Conservative	Tom King	23,850	44.3	+0.7
Labour	A Mitchell	17,663	32.78	+4.3
Liberal	JHG Wyatt	12,077	22.4	−4.4
United Democratic	SR Harrad	288	0.5	New
Majority		6,187	11.5	−2.6
Turnout		53,878	77.2	−5.0
Conservative hold		Swing	–1.3	

General election February 1974: Bridgwater
Party	Candidate	Votes	%	±%
Conservative	Tom King	24,830	43.65	−8.7
Labour	R Undy	16,786	29.5	−6.3
Liberal	JHG Wyatt	15,269	26.8	+14.9
Majority		8,044	14.1	−2.4
Turnout		56,885	82.25	+5.2
Conservative hold		Swing	–1.2	

General election 1970: Bridgwater
Party	Candidate	Votes	%	±%
Conservative	Tom King	26,685	52.3	+7.9
Labour	Raymond J Billington	18,224	35.8	−2.3
Liberal	Patrick M O'Loughlin	6,066	11.9	−5.6
Majority		8,461	16.5	+10.2
Turnout		50,975	77.0	−3.2
Conservative hold		Swing	+5.3	

1970 Bridgwater by-election
Party	Candidate	Votes	%	±%
Conservative	Tom King	25,687	55.5	+11.1
Labour	Richard Mayer	14,772	31.9	−6.2
Liberal	Patrick M O'Loughlin	5,832	12.6	−4.9
Majority		10,915	23.6	+17.3
Turnout		46,291	70.3	−9.9
Conservative hold		Swing	+8.6	

=== Elections in the 1960s ===
General election 1966: Bridgwater
Party	Candidate	Votes	%	±%
Conservative	Gerald Wills	20,850	44.4	−0.4
Labour	Richard Mayer	17,864	38.1	+6.6
Liberal	Philip Watkins	8,205	17.5	−1.9
Majority		2,986	6.3	−7.0
Turnout		46,919	80.2	−0.1
Conservative hold		Swing	+3.5	

General election 1964: Bridgwater
Party	Candidate	Votes	%	±%
Conservative	Gerald Wills	20,822	44.8	−5.6
Labour	Norman J Hart	14,645	31.5	−0.7
Liberal	Philip Watkins	9,009	19.4	+2.1
Independent	Michael L de V Hart	2,038	4.4	New
Majority		6,177	13.3	−4.9
Turnout		46,514	80.3	−1.5
Conservative hold		Swing		

=== Elections in the 1950s ===
General election 1959: Bridgwater
Party	Candidate	Votes	%	±%
Conservative	Gerald Wills	23,002	50.44	
Labour	James Finnigan	14,706	32.25	
Liberal	Philip Watkins	7,893	17.31	New
Majority		8,296	18.19	
Turnout		45,601	81.77	
Conservative hold		Swing		

General election 1955: Bridgwater
Party	Candidate	Votes	%	±%
Conservative	Gerald Wills	24,887	59.17	
Labour	Albert E Sumbler	17,170	40.83	
Majority		7,717	18.34	
Turnout		42,057	78.00	
Conservative hold		Swing		

General election 1951: Bridgwater
Party	Candidate	Votes	%	±%
Conservative	Gerald Wills	25,365	56.34	
Labour Co-op	Norman E Carr	19,656	43.66	
Majority		5,709	12.68	
Turnout		45,021	84.63	
Conservative hold		Swing		

General election 1950: Bridgwater
Party	Candidate	Votes	%	±%
Conservative	Gerald Wills	21,732	48.84	
Labour Co-op	Norman E Carr	16,053	36.08	
Independent	Stephen King-Hall	6,708	15.08	New
Majority		5,679	12.76	N/A
Turnout		44,493	85.75	
Conservative gain from Independent Progressive		Swing		

=== Elections in the 1940s ===
General election 1945: Bridgwater
Party	Candidate	Votes	%	±%
Independent Progressive	Vernon Bartlett	17,937	45.79	N/A
Conservative	Gerald Wills	15,625	39.89	
Labour	Norman Corkhill	5,613	14.33	
Majority		2,312	5.90	
Turnout		39,175	72.69	
Independent Progressive hold		Swing		

General Election 1939–40:

Another General Election was required to take place before the end of 1940. The political parties had been making preparations for an election to take place and by the Autumn of 1939, the following candidates had been selected;

- Independent Progressive: Vernon Bartlett
- Conservative: Patrick Heathcoat Amery

=== Elections in the 1930s ===
1938 Bridgwater by-election
Party	Candidate	Votes	%	±%
Independent Progressive	Vernon Bartlett	19,540	53.2	New
Conservative	Patrick Gerald Heathcoat-Amory	17,208	46.8	−10.1
Majority		2,332	6.4	N/A
Turnout		36,748	82.3	+9.6
Independent Progressive gain from Conservative		Swing		

General election 1935: Bridgwater
Party	Candidate	Votes	%	±%
Conservative	Reginald Croom-Johnson	17,939	56.9	−20.6
Liberal	Norman David Blake	7,370	23.4	New
Labour	Arthur W Loveys	6,240	19.8	−2.7
Majority		10,569	33.5	−21.5
Turnout		31,549	72.7	−1.1
Conservative hold		Swing		

General election 1931: Bridgwater
Party	Candidate	Votes	%	±%
Conservative	Reginald Croom-Johnson	24,041	77.5	+30.7
Labour	James Musgrave Boltz	6,974	22.5	+3.1
Majority		17,067	55.03	+42.0
Turnout		31,015	73.8	−6.6
Conservative hold		Swing		

=== Elections in the 1920s ===
General election 1929: Bridgwater
Party	Candidate	Votes	%	±%
Unionist	Reginald Croom-Johnson	15,440	46.8	−5.9
Liberal	Joseph William Molden	11,161	33.8	−6.2
Labour	James Musgrave Boltz	6,423	19.4	+12.1
Majority		4,279	13.0	+0.3
Turnout		33,024	80.4	−4.0
Registered electors		41,068		
Unionist hold		Swing	+0.1	

General election 1924: Bridgwater
Party	Candidate	Votes	%	±%
Unionist	Brooks Wood	14,283	52.7	+5.4
Liberal	William Morse	10,842	40.0	−12.7
Labour	James Musgrave Boltz	1,966	7.3	New
Majority		3,441	12.7	N/A
Turnout		27,091	84.4	+1.0
Registered electors		32,111		
Unionist gain from Liberal		Swing	+9.1	

General election 1923: Bridgwater
Party	Candidate	Votes	%	±%
Liberal	William Morse	13,778	52.7	+6.3
Unionist	Robert Sanders	12,347	47.3	+0.4
Majority		1,431	5.4	N/A
Turnout		26,125	83.4	+5.2
Registered electors		31,317		
Liberal gain from Unionist		Swing	+3.0	

General election 1922: Bridgwater
Party	Candidate	Votes	%	±%
Unionist	Robert Sanders	11,240	46.9	−21.7
Liberal	William Morse	11,121	46.4	New
Labour	Thomas Williams	1,598	6.7	−24.7
Majority		119	0.5	−36.7
Turnout		23,959	78.2	+15.8
Registered electors		30,657		
Unionist hold		Swing	−34.1	

=== Elections in the 1910s ===
General election 1918: Bridgwater
Party		Candidate	Votes	%	±%
C	Unionist	Robert Sanders	12,587	68.6	+10.9
	Labour	Sid Plummer	5,771	31.4	New
Majority			6,816	37.2	+21.8
Turnout			18,358	62.4	
Registered electors			29,411		
	Unionist hold		Swing	N/A	
C indicates candidate endorsed by the coalition government.

By-election, 1918: Bridgwater
Party	Candidate	Votes	%	±%
Conservative	Robert Sanders	Unopposed		
Conservative hold				

General Election 1914–15:

Another General Election was required to take place before the end of 1915. The political parties had been making preparations for an election to take place from 1914 and by the end of this year, the following candidates had been selected;

- Unionist: Robert Sanders
- Liberal: Philip Foale Rowsell

Sanders is appointed Treasurer of the Household, requiring him to seek re-election.

General election December 1910: Bridgwater
Party	Candidate	Votes	%	±%
Conservative	Robert Sanders	5,160	57.7	−1.2
Liberal	Harold C. Hicks	3,779	42.3	+1.2
Majority		1,381	15.4	−2.4
Turnout		8,939		
Conservative hold		Swing	−1.2	

General election January 1910: Bridgwater
Party	Candidate	Votes	%	±%
Conservative	Robert Sanders	5,575	58.9	+9.0
Liberal	Harold C. Hicks	3,896	41.1	−9.0
Majority		1,679	17.8	18.0
Turnout		9,471		
Conservative gain from Liberal		Swing	+9.0	

=== Elections in the 1900s ===
Montgomery

General election 1906: Bridgwater
Party	Candidate	Votes	%	±%
Liberal	Henry Montgomery	4,422	50.1	New
Conservative	Robert Sanders	4,405	49.9	N/A
Majority		17	0.2	N/A
Turnout		8,827	86.7	N/A
Registered electors		10,180		
Liberal gain from Conservative		Swing	N/A	

Edward Stanley

General election 1900: Bridgwater
Party	Candidate	Votes	%	±%
Conservative	Edward Stanley	Unopposed		
Conservative hold				

=== Elections in the 1890s ===
General election 1895: Bridgwater
Party	Candidate	Votes	%	±%
Conservative	Edward Stanley	Unopposed		
Conservative hold				

General election 1892: Bridgwater
Party	Candidate	Votes	%	±%
Conservative	Edward Stanley	4,555	57.5	N/A
Liberal	James Douglas Walker	3,362	42.5	New
Majority		1,193	15.0	N/A
Turnout		7,917	77.5	N/A
Registered electors		10,220		
Conservative hold		Swing	N/A	

=== Elections in the 1880s ===
General election 1886: Bridgwater
Party	Candidate	Votes	%	±%
Conservative	Edward Stanley	Unopposed		
Conservative hold				

General election 1885: Bridgwater
Party	Candidate	Votes	%	±%
Conservative	Edward Stanley	3,935	50.6	
Liberal	Edwin Brook Cely Trevilian	3,835	49.4	
Majority		100	1.2	
Turnout		7,770	78.8	
Registered electors		9,861		
Conservative win (new seat)				

=== Elections in the 1860s ===
General election 1868: Bridgwater (2 seats)
Party	Candidate	Votes	%	±%
Liberal	Alexander William Kinglake	731	26.2	−5.1
Liberal	Philip Vanderbyl	725	26.0	−2.8
Conservative	Henry Westropp	681	24.4	+4.4
Conservative	Charles William Gray	650	23.3	+3.3
Majority		44	1.6	N/A
Turnout		1,394 (est)	93.0 (est)	+3.7
Registered electors		1,499		
Liberal hold		Swing	−4.2	
Liberal gain from Conservative		Swing	−3.6	

A Royal Commission found extensive bribery in the seat and, from 4 July 1870, the writ was suspended, both MPs were unseated, and the electorate was absorbed into West Somerset.

By-election, 12 Jul 1866: Bridgwater (1 seat)
Party	Candidate	Votes	%	±%
Liberal	Philip Vanderbyl	312	53.2	−6.9
Conservative	George Patton	275	46.8	+6.9
Majority		37	6.4	N/A
Turnout		587	91.1	+1.8
Registered electors		644		
Liberal gain from Conservative		Swing	−6.9	

By-election, 7 Jun 1866: Bridgwater (1 seat)
Party	Candidate	Votes	%	±%
Conservative	George Patton	301	50.7	+10.8
Liberal	Walter Bagehot	293	49.3	−10.8
Majority		8	1.4	−9.7
Turnout		594	92.2	+2.9
Registered electors		644		
Conservative hold		Swing	+10.8	

Patton was appointed Lord Advocate, requiring a by-election.

General election 1865: Bridgwater (2 seats)
Party	Candidate	Votes	%	±%
Conservative	Henry Westropp	328	39.9	−3.6
Liberal	Alexander William Kinglake	257	31.3	+3.6
Liberal	John Shelley	237	28.8	0.0
Majority		91	11.1	N/A
Turnout		575 (est)	89.3 (est)	+7.3
Registered electors		644		
Conservative gain from Liberal		Swing	−3.6	
Liberal hold		Swing	+2.7	

Westropp's election was declared void on petition on 25 April 1866, causing a by-election.

=== Elections in the 1850s ===
General election 1859: Bridgwater (2 seats)
Party	Candidate	Votes	%	±%
Liberal	Charles Kemeys-Tynte	290	28.8	−10.8
Liberal	Alexander William Kinglake	279	27.7	−8.4
Conservative	Henry Padwick	230	22.8	+10.6
Conservative	Henry Westropp	208	20.7	+8.5
Majority		49	4.9	−6.9
Turnout		504 (est)	82.0 (est)	−6.0
Registered electors		614		
Liberal hold		Swing	−10.2	
Liberal hold		Swing	−9.0	

General election 1857: Bridgwater (2 seats)
Party	Candidate	Votes	%	±%
Whig	Charles Kemeys-Tynte	330	39.6	+10.8
Whig	Alexander William Kinglake	301	36.1	+25.4
Conservative	Brent Follett	203	24.3	−20.4
Majority		98	11.8	+8.9
Turnout		519 (est)	88.0 (est)	+11.5
Registered electors		589		
Whig hold		Swing	+10.5	
Whig gain from Conservative		Swing	+17.8	

General election 1852: Bridgwater (2 seats)
Party	Candidate	Votes	%	±%
Whig	Charles Kemeys-Tynte	271	28.8	−17.3
Conservative	Brent Follett	244	25.9	+10.4
Conservative	John Clavell Mansel	177	18.8	+3.3
Whig	Anthony Henley	149	15.8	N/A
Whig	Alexander William Kinglake	101	10.7	N/A
Turnout		471 (est)	68.5 (est)	−12.4
Registered electors		688		
Majority		27	2.9	−12.2
Whig hold		Swing	−15.5	
Majority		95	10.0	+1.9
Conservative hold		Swing	+9.5	

=== Elections in the 1840s ===
General election 1847: Bridgwater (2 seats)
Party	Candidate	Votes	%	±%
Whig	Charles Kemeys-Tynte	395	46.1	−0.7
Conservative	Henry Broadwood	265	31.0	−22.2
Radical	Stephen Gaselee	196	22.9	N/A
Turnout		428 (est)	80.9 (est)	−7.3
Registered electors		529		
Majority		130	15.1	N/A
Whig gain from Conservative		Swing	+5.2	
Majority		69	8.1	+5.3
Conservative hold		Swing	−10.9	

General election 1841: Bridgwater (2 seats)
Party	Candidate	Votes	%	±%
Conservative	Henry Broadwood	280	26.8	−22.8
Conservative	Thomas Seaton Forman	276	26.4	−22.8
Whig	Edward Simcoe Drewe	247	23.6	+22.7
Whig	Augustin Robinson	242	23.2	+22.8
Majority		29	2.8	−45.5
Turnout		525	88.2	+37.3
Registered electors		595		
Conservative hold		Swing	−22.8	
Conservative hold		Swing	−22.8	

=== Elections in the 1830s ===
General election 1837: Bridgwater (2 seats)
Party	Candidate	Votes	%	±%
Conservative	Henry Broadwood	279	49.6	+25.7
Conservative	Philip Courtenay	277	49.2	+28.8
Whig	Thomas Lethbridge	5	0.9	−13.9
Whig	Richard Brinsley Sheridan	2	0.4	−14.4
Majority		272	48.3	N/A
Turnout		284	50.9	−21.0
Registered electors		558		
Conservative gain from Whig		Swing	+19.9	
Conservative gain from Radical		Swing	+21.5	

By-election, 16 May 1837: Bridgwater
Party	Candidate	Votes	%	±%
Conservative	Henry Broadwood	279	55.8	+11.5
Whig	Richard Brinsley Sheridan	221	44.2	+14.7
Majority		58	11.6	N/A
Turnout		500	89.6	+17.7
Registered electors		558		
Conservative gain from Radical		Swing	−1.6	

General election 1835: Bridgwater (2 seats)
Party	Candidate	Votes	%	±%
Whig	Charles Kemeys-Tynte	234	29.5	N/A
Radical	John Temple Leader	208	26.2	N/A
Conservative	Henry Broadwood	190	23.9	New
Conservative	Francis Mountjoy Martyn	162	20.4	New
Turnout		309	71.9	N/A
Registered electors		430		
Majority		26	3.3	N/A
Whig hold		Swing	N/A	
Majority		18	2.3	N/A
Radical gain from Whig		Swing	N/A	

Leader resigned, by accepting the office of Steward of the Chiltern Hundreds, in order to contest a by-election at Westminster, causing a by-election.

General election 1832: Bridgwater (2 seats)
Party	Candidate	Votes	%	±%
Whig	Charles Kemeys-Tynte	Unopposed		
Whig	William Tayleur	Unopposed		
Registered electors		484		
Whig hold				
Whig gain from Tory				

General election 1831: Bridgwater (2 seats)
Party	Candidate	Votes	%	±%
Whig	Charles Kemeys-Tynte	337	44.8	N/A
Tory	William Astell	213	28.3	N/A
Radical	Henry Shirley	202	26.9	N/A
Turnout		430		N/A
Majority		124	16.5	N/A
Whig hold		Swing	N/A	
Majority		11	1.4	N/A
Whig hold		Swing	N/A	

General election 1830: Bridgwater (2 seats)
Party	Candidate	Votes	%	±%
Tory	William Astell	Unopposed		
Whig	Charles Kemeys-Tynte	Unopposed		
Tory hold				
Whig hold				

== See also ==
- List of parliamentary constituencies in Somerset

== Sources ==
- Boundaries of Parliamentary Constituencies 1885–1972, compiled and edited by F.W.S. Craig (Parliamentary Reference Publications 1972)
- British Parliamentary Election Results 1832–1885, compiled and edited by F.W.S. Craig (Macmillan Press 1977)
- British Parliamentary Election Results 1885–1918, compiled and edited by F.W.S. Craig (Macmillan Press 1974)
- British Parliamentary Election Results 1918–1949, compiled and edited by F.W.S. Craig (Macmillan Press, revised edition 1977)
- British Parliamentary Election Results 1950–1973, compiled and edited by F.W.S. Craig (Parliamentary Research Services 1983)
- Who's Who of British Members of Parliament: Volume I 1832–1885, edited by M. Stenton (The Harvester Press 1976)
- Who's Who of British Members of Parliament, Volume II 1886–1918, edited by M. Stenton and S. Lees (Harvester Press 1978)
- Who's Who of British Members of Parliament, Volume III 1919–1945, edited by M. Stenton and S. Lees (Harvester Press 1979)
- Who's Who of British Members of Parliament, Volume IV 1945–1979, edited by M. Stenton and S. Lees (Harvester Press 1981)
- Robert Beatson, A Chronological Register of Both Houses of Parliament (London: Longman, Hurst, Res & Orme, 1807)
- D Brunton & D H Pennington, Members of the Long Parliament (London: George Allen & Unwin, 1954)
- Cobbett's Parliamentary history of England, from the Norman Conquest in 1066 to the year 1803 (London: Thomas Hansard, 1808)
- Esther S Cope and Willson H Coates (eds), Camden Fourth Series, Volume 19: Proceedings of the Short Parliament of 1640 (London: Royal Historical Society, 1977)
- Maija Jansson (ed.), Proceedings in Parliament, 1614 (House of Commons) (Philadelphia: American Philosophical Society, 1988)
- J E Neale, The Elizabethan House of Commons (London: Jonathan Cape, 1949)
- 'Bridgwater: Parliamentary representation' in Victoria County History of Somerset: Volume 6 (1992)
