= Edward Popham (died 1586) =

English politician

Edward Popham (by 1530 – 24 January 1586), of Huntworth, Somerset, was an English politician.

== Family ==
He was the son of Alexander Popham, MP for Bridgwater, and his wife Joan née Stradling. On 1 July 1551, Edward married Jane Norton of Abbots Leigh, Bristol, and they had nine daughters and seven sons, including MP for Bridgwater, Alexander.

== Career ==
He was a Member (MP) of the Parliament of England for Guildford in 1558, Hythe in 1563, and Bridgwater in 1571, 1572 and 1584.
