= 1918 Bridgwater by-election =

UK Parliamentary by-election

The 1918 Bridgwater by-election was held on 18 June 1918. The by-election was held due to the incumbent Conservative MP, Robert Sanders, becoming Treasurer of the Household. It was retained by Sanders who was unopposed due to a War-time electoral pact.
