= Henry Montgomery (Liberal politician) =

Greville Montgomery

Henry Greville Montgomery (1863 – 2 December 1951) was a British Liberal Party politician, newspaper proprietor, and leading figure in the brickwork business. He was the member of parliament (MP) for Bridgwater from 1906 to 1910.

== Background ==
He was the son of Hugh and Eliza Montgomery. He was educated privately. He first married Florence Shepherd. He then married Emily Lewis. He was a descendant of the poet James Montgomery.

== Professional career ==
In 1892 he founded The British Clayworker, the organ of the Brick and Tile Trades. In 1895 as an outcome of this, the Institute of Clayworkers was inaugurated. In 1895 he revived the Building Trades Exhibition at Royal Agricultural Hall, London, subsequently held at Olympia. In 1903 he inaugurated the first Colliery Exhibition held in Britain. In 1908 he was also involved in the world's Mining Exhibition held at the Olympia in London. He was a Master of the Tylers' and Bricklayers' Company. He was a Member of Council of the Royal Drawing Society. He was an Honorary member of Royal Institute of British Architects. He was Patron of the living of Norton Malreward, Somerset. He served as a justice of the peace in Norfolk.

== Political career ==
He was Private Secretary to William Sproston Caine MP, Lord Yarborough and the Dowager Duchess of Montrose. He was Liberal candidate for the Bridgwater Division of Somerset at the 1906 General Election. It was the first time he had stood for parliament. He was not expected to win as the seat had been Unionist since it was created in 1885. In fact, the Liberal party had not even bothered to field a candidate at the two previous elections. However, in 1906 the country swung behind the Liberals and he gained Bridgwater by the margin of just 17 votes.

The Liberal party Chief Whip at the time, Jack Pease described Montgomery as "a decent man" who warranted "no great attention", adding "nor did he possess much weight". After serving one parliamentary term he did not defend his seat at the January 1910 general election.

=== Election results ===
General election 1906: Bridgwater Electorate 10,180
Party	Candidate	Votes	%	±%
Liberal	Henry Montgomery	4,422	50.1	n/a
Unionist	Robert Sanders	4,405	49.9	n/a
Majority		17	0.2	n/a
Turnout		8,827	86.7	n/a
Liberal gain from Unionist		Swing	n/a	

Parliament of the United Kingdom
Preceded by Edward Stanley	Member of Parliament for Bridgwater; 1906 – Jan 1910	Succeeded by Robert Sanders
