= Independent progressive =

Concept in political science

Independent progressive is a description used both in the United Kingdom and elsewhere to denote a political progressive who lacks a formal affiliation to a party.

== In the United Kingdom ==
In the late 19th century/early 20th century, the Progressive Party was formed as a party in that contested local government elections in London. Members included those who stood at parliamentary elections as either Liberal or Labour party candidates.

At a national level, the relationship that existed between the Liberal and Labour parties from 1906 to 1918 was referred to as the Progressive Alliance.

At the 1935 general election, just one candidate stood as an independent progressive, and that was Gerald Bailey at Aldershot. Bailey, a Quaker, had stood as a Liberal in 1929 and since 1930 had run the National Peace Council.

=== Popular Front ===
In the late 1930s, many, including prominent Labour politician Sir Stafford Cripps, advocated a Popular Front in which the Labour and Liberal parties would unite with other groups on the left to counter the Conservative-dominated National Government. The idea was for the parties of the left to agree to support only one candidate at constituency level. In most cases this would be a known member of either the Labour or Liberal parties, but sometimes it would be a candidate of neither party, who would be supported by both parties as an independent progressive.

During the 1935–1945 parliament, a number of candidates stood in by-elections as independent progressives:

- Thomas Edmund Harvey, a former Liberal MP, won the 1937 Combined English Universities by-election, gaining a seat from the Conservatives.
- Sir Peter Chalmers Mitchell fought the 1938 Combined Scottish Universities by-election.
- Sandy Lindsay fought the 1938 Oxford by-election.
- Vernon Bartlett won the 1938 Bridgwater by-election, gaining the seat from the Conservatives.
- Dr Billy Carritt, a member of the Communist party, fought the 1939 Westminster Abbey by-election.

=== 1939 ===
With a general election expected to take place in the autumn of 1939, in a number of constituencies, the local Labour and Liberal parties agreed not to run their own candidates but instead adopt an Independent Progressive:

- Vernon Bartlett (Bridgwater)
- Patrick Early (Banbury)
- William John Brown (Stroud)
- William Robert Robins (Cirencester and Tewkesbury)
- Michael Alexander Pinney (Tiverton)
- John Langdon-Davies (Rye)

=== 1940–1945 ===
During the war, this trend continued:

- Prof. John Alfred Ryle fought the 1940 Cambridge University by-election.
- Reg Hipwell fought a number of by-elections:
  - 1941 Hampstead by-election
  - 1941 Scarborough and Whitby by-election
  - 1942 Salisbury by-election
  - 1943 The Hartlepools by-election
- Gerald Kidd fought the 1942 Chichester by-election.
- William Douglas-Home fought the 1942 Windsor by-election and the 1942 Glasgow Cathcart by-election.
- Alan Dawrant fought the 1943 Newark by-election.

=== 1945 general election ===
At the 1945 general election, there were only seven candidates who used the label:

- Vernon Bartlett was re-elected at Bridgwater.
- Eleanor Rathbone at Combined English Universities was re-elected on that label.
- J. A. Ward fought Edmonton.
- Aubrey Bernard Brocklehurst fought Eccles.
- Sydney Muller Parkman fought Hastings.
- J. B. Priestley fought Cambridge University.
- Mary Stocks fought London University.

=== Revival following the 2016 EU referendum ===
In reaction to the lack of unified pro-EU voice following the 2016 EU referendum, the Liberal Democrats and others discussed the launch of a new pro-EU political movement. This was officially launched on 24 June as More United.
