= Edward Popham (MP for Bridgwater) =

Edward Popham (1581–1641) was an English member of parliament for Bridgewater in 1621, 1624, 1625 and 1626, and was also Sheriff of Somerset for the year 1622/23.

== Biography ==
Popham was born on 11 November 1581. He was the eldest son of Alexander Popham of Huntworth and Dowsabell, daughter John Bayley of ?Salisbury, Wiltshire, and educated in the law at the Middle Temple (1600). He was a cousin of Edward Popham, the Naval Commander and MP. He inherited estates from his father in 1602.

In May 1607 Popham abandoned the law to sail on an expedition to establish a colony at Sagadahoc, Maine. This colony, established by his great-uncle, Lord Chief Justice Sir John Popham, and led by his uncle, the Bridgwater merchant George Popham, failed within two years.

Popham was a justice of the peace for Somerset from 1607 to 1626 and was appointed Sheriff of Somerset for 1622–1623. He was elected MP for Bridgewater in 1621, 1624, 1625 and 1626.

Popham was constantly beset by financial difficulties and was forced to sell his estates and around 1630 was forced to flee to France to escape his debtors. He died childless and bequeathed his remaining estate, to which his title was by now disputed, to his brother.

== Family ==
Popham married twice: firstly Dorothy (died 1614), the daughter of Richard Bartlett of Berkshire, with whom he had a son who predeceased him and secondly Anne, the daughter of Henry Gifford and the widow of Sir John Portman of Orchard Portman, Somerset.
