= 1938 Bridgwater by-election =

UK parliamentary by-election

The 1938 Bridgwater by-election was a parliamentary by-election for the British House of Commons constituency of Bridgwater, Somerset held on 17 November 1938.

== Vacancy ==
The by-election was triggered when Reginald Croom-Johnson, the sitting Conservative member was appointed a High Court Judge in October 1938 which required him to resign his seat in parliament. He had been MP here since holding the seat in 1929.

== Election history ==
Ever since the constituency was created in 1885, the Conservatives had won the seat, with the exception of the Liberal landslide of 1906 and the General Election of 1923, when the Liberals had won. The Labour party had always polled poorly and always coming last, except in 1923 when the Liberals won. At the last General Election, the Liberal challenge was not as strong as it had been;

General election 1935: Bridgwater Electorate 43,367
Party	Candidate	Votes	%	±%
Conservative	Reginald Croom-Johnson	17,939	56.9	−20.6
Liberal	N D Blake	7,370	23.4	New
Labour	Arthur W Loveys	6,240	19.8	−2.7
Majority		10,569	33.5	−21.5
Turnout		31,549	72.7	−1.1
Conservative hold		Swing		

== Background ==
On 29 September 1938, British Prime Minister Neville Chamberlain had signed the Munich Agreement, handing over the Sudetenland to German control. This issue polarised British politics at the time, with many Labour supporters, Liberals, and some Conservatives strongly opposed to this policy of appeasement. Many by-elections in the autumn of 1938 were fought around this issue, notably the Oxford by-election, where Liberals and Labour united in support of an Independent anti-appeasement candidate.

== Candidates ==
The Conservative Party selected 26-year-old lawyer and former Territorial Army officer Patrick Gerald Heathcoat-Amory of Tiverton as its candidate. He was thought to be assured of a sizeable agricultural vote, half of the electorate lived in rural areas at this time.

Vernon Bartlett was a journalist and broadcaster with extensive experience of foreign affairs. He was approached by Richard Acland, Liberal MP for Barnstaple, a seat bordering Bridgwater, about standing as an anti-appeasement candidate in the by-election. Bartlett agreed to do so provided he had the support of the Liberal and Labour parties. The Bridgwater Liberal Party unanimously backed Bartlett's candidature.

Before the by-election vacancy was known, the local Labour Party had already re-adopted Arthur Loveys their previous candidate, to contest a General Election expected to occur in 1939. Loveys withdrew and Labour generally supported Bartlett, although many in the Labour Party were unenthusiastic about co-operation with the Liberals.

== Campaign ==
The campaign was intense and focused almost entirely on foreign affairs. Heathcoat-Amory supported Chamberlain's appeasement policy. Bartlett opposed appeasement and was a very persuasive speaker on the subject. His voice was already well known due to his radio broadcasts. His experience of foreign affairs and erudite speeches were very effective at a time when public meetings were a vital part of electioneering.

Many Liberal personalities came to support Bartlett, including Megan Lloyd George, Lady Violet Bonham Carter and Sir Charles Hobhouse. Some Labour voters were reluctant to support Bartlett, believing he was really a Liberal candidate. However, he did receive a letter of support from 39 Labour MPs just before polling day.

== Result ==
The intensive campaign caused turnout to increase from 72.7% at the last election to 82.3%. Bartlett won the seat with a majority of 2,332 or 6.3%. He hailed the result as a defeat for Chamberlain, saying that it showed people understood the dangers of the Government's foreign policy.

Bridgwater by-election, 17th November 1938 Electorate 44,653
Party	Candidate	Votes	%	±%
Independent Progressive	Vernon Bartlett	19,540	53.2	New
Conservative	Patrick Heathcoat-Amory	17,208	46.8	−10.1
Majority		2,332	6.4	N/A
Turnout		36,748	82.3	+9.6
Independent Progressive gain from Conservative		Swing	N/A	

== Aftermath ==
At the following General Election, Bartlett, retaining support from the Liberals, but now opposed by the Labour party, managed to hang onto the seat;

General election 1945: Bridgwater Electorate: 53,896
Party	Candidate	Votes	%	±%
Independent Progressive	Vernon Bartlett	17,937	45.8	−7.4
Conservative	Gerald Wills	15,625	39.9	−6.9
Labour	N Corkhill	5,613	14.3	New
Majority		2,312	5.9	−0.4
Turnout		39,175	72.7	−9.6
Independent Progressive hold		Swing	−0.2	

== In popular culture ==
A Monty Python skit called "The North Minehead By-Election" was influenced by this event, whereby Minehead, another town in Somerset, is having a by-election. One of the candidates, played by John Cleese, is an Adolf Hitler looking man who calls himself "Mr Hilter" and who espouses a philosophy called "National Bocialism".

== See also ==
- Lists of United Kingdom by-elections
