= Tom King, Baron King of Bridgwater =

British Conservative politician and life peer (born 1933)

The Right Honourable The Lord King of Bridgwater CH PC
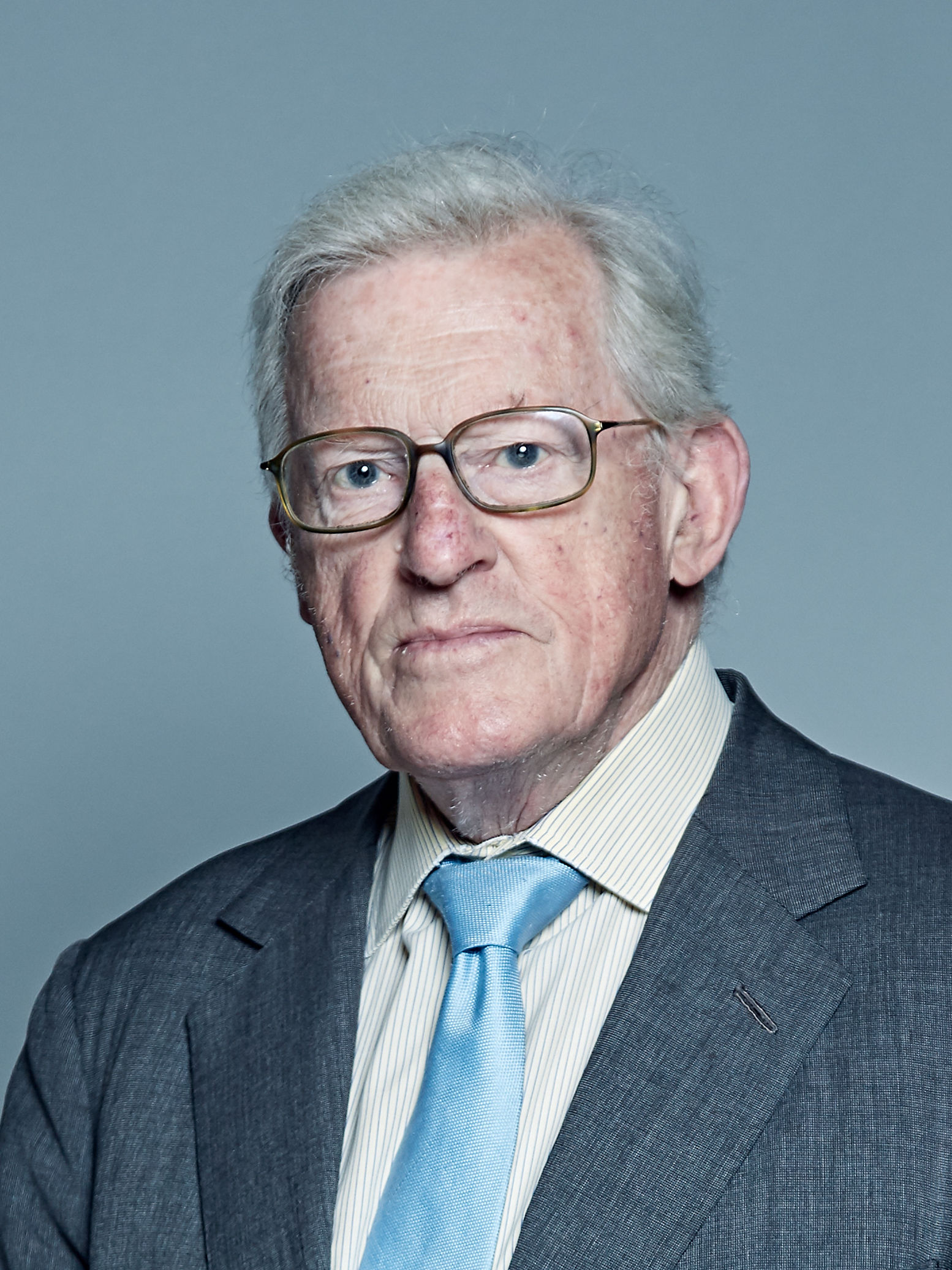

Secretary of State for Defence
- In office 24 July 1989 – 11 April 1992
- Prime Minister: Margaret Thatcher; John Major
- Preceded by: George Younger
- Succeeded by: Malcolm Rifkind

Secretary of State for Northern Ireland
- In office 3 September 1985 – 24 July 1989
- Prime Minister: Margaret Thatcher
- Preceded by: Douglas Hurd
- Succeeded by: Peter Brooke

Secretary of State for Employment
- In office 16 October 1983 – 2 September 1985
- Prime Minister: Margaret Thatcher
- Preceded by: Norman Tebbit
- Succeeded by: The Lord Young of Graffham

Secretary of State for Transport
- In office 11 June 1983 – 16 October 1983
- Prime Minister: Margaret Thatcher
- Preceded by: David Howell
- Succeeded by: Nicholas Ridley

Secretary of State for the Environment
- In office 6 January 1983 – 11 June 1983
- Prime Minister: Margaret Thatcher
- Preceded by: Michael Heseltine
- Succeeded by: Patrick Jenkin

Shadow Secretary of State for Energy
- In office 19 November 1976 – 4 May 1979
- Leader: Margaret Thatcher
- Preceded by: John Biffen
- Succeeded by: David Owen

Member of the House of Lords
- Lord Temporal
- Life peerage 9 July 2001

Member of Parliament for Bridgwater
- In office 12 March 1970 – 14 May 2001
- Preceded by: Gerald Wills
- Succeeded by: Ian Liddell-Grainger

Personal details
- Born: 13 June 1933 (age 93) Rugby, Warwickshire, England
- Party: Conservative
- Spouse: Elizabeth Jane King
- Education: Emmanuel College, Cambridge

Thomas Jeremy King, Baron King of Bridgwater, CH, PC (born 13 June 1933) is a British politician. A member of the Conservative Party, he served in the Cabinet from 1983 to 1992, and was the Member of Parliament (MP) for the constituency of Bridgwater in Somerset from 1970 to 2001. He was made a life peer in 2001.

== Life and career ==
=== Education ===
King was educated at two independent schools: at St Michael's School, a former boys' preparatory school (later co-educational), in the village of Tawstock in North Devon, followed by Rugby School (Sheriff House), a boarding school for boys in Warwickshire, before attending Emmanuel College, Cambridge.

=== Military service ===
King was commissioned as an officer in the Somerset Light Infantry in 1952 and during his period of national service he was seconded to the King's African Rifles.

=== Political career ===
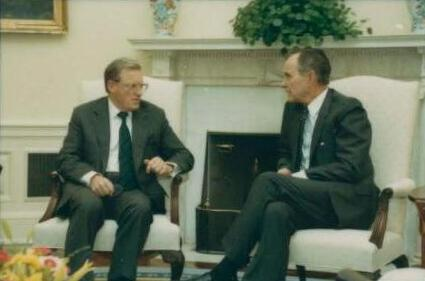
King with President George H. W. Bush in 1990

King was elected to Parliament at the 1970 Bridgwater by-election, following the death of the sitting MP, Sir Gerald Wills.

King was brought into the Cabinet in 1983 by Prime Minister Margaret Thatcher. After brief stints as the Environment Secretary and Transport Secretary, he went on to hold the posts of Employment Secretary and Northern Ireland Secretary at a time when these were high-profile roles with the potential for controversy.

In October 1988, John McCann, Finbar Cullen and Martina Shanahan, all from the Republic of Ireland, were convicted at Winchester Crown Court of conspiracy to murder King near his home in Wiltshire and sentenced to 25 years in prison. No evidence was produced in the trial that the defendants belonged to the IRA. The trio were freed after serving two and a half years after their convictions were quashed. The Court of Appeal ruled that their trial could have been prejudiced by comments made by King who said the defendants should not have the right to remain silent. The former Master of the Rolls, Lord Denning, criticised the Appeal Court ruling, stating: "British justice has been betrayed by the Court of Appeal, in my opinion. Justice was done at Winchester Crown Court."

King went on to serve as Defence Secretary under Prime Minister John Major during the Gulf War. He left the Cabinet following the 1992 general election, and returned to the backbenches where he served as Chairman of the Intelligence and Security Select Committee from 1994 to 2001, during which time KGB agent Vasili Mitrokhin defected to reveal 87-year-old Melita Norwood as a Soviet spy.

King left the House of Commons at the 2001 general election, and was created a life peer as Baron King of Bridgwater, of Bridgwater in the County of Somerset on 9 July 2001. He now sits in the House of Lords. He serves as Deputy Chairman of the Conservative Party's Policy Group on National and International Security, which was set up by David Cameron in 2006.

== In popular culture ==
King was portrayed by Peter Blythe in the 2004 BBC production of The Alan Clark Diaries.

King was the subject of a song in the satirical ITV programme Spitting Image in which he was depicted as the Invisible Man during his term as Employment Secretary.

Parliament of the United Kingdom
Preceded by Gerald Wills	Member of Parliament for Bridgwater; 1970–2001	Succeeded by Ian Liddell-Grainger
Political offices
Preceded by Michael Heseltine	Secretary of State for the Environment; 1983	Succeeded by Patrick Jenkin
Preceded by David Howell	Secretary of State for Transport; 1983	Succeeded by Nicholas Ridley
Preceded by Norman Tebbit	Secretary of State for Employment; 1983–1985	Succeeded by The Lord Young of Graffham
Preceded by Douglas Hurd	Secretary of State for Northern Ireland; 1985–1989	Succeeded by Peter Brooke
Preceded by George Younger	Secretary of State for Defence; 1989–1992	Succeeded by Malcolm Rifkind
New office	Chairperson of the Intelligence and Security Committee; 1994–2001	Succeeded by Ann Taylor
Orders of precedence in the United Kingdom
Preceded by The Lord Jones	Gentlemen; Baron King of Bridgwater	Followed by The Lord Heseltine
