= Gerald Wills =

British barrister and politician

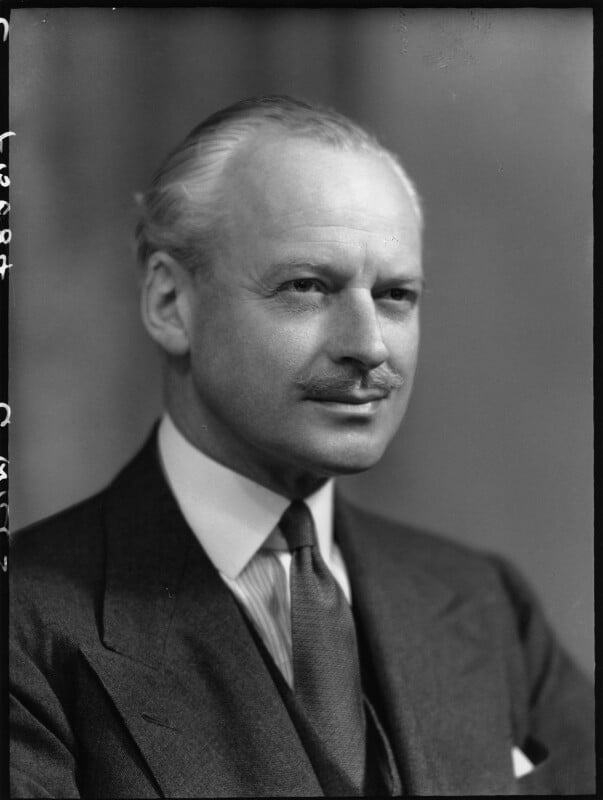
Wills in 1952

Sir Gerald Wills, MBE (3 October 1905 – 31 October 1969) was a British barrister and politician who was Member of Parliament (MP) for Bridgwater from 1950 until his death.

Wills was born in Long Ashton, Somerset to a working family, and at 21 was adopted into a wealthy family living in Wiltshire who educated him privately. He went to Trinity College, Cambridge to study law and was called to the Bar by the Middle Temple in 1932. He was a member of the Territorial branch of the Royal Artillery and during the Second World War he was a Staff member at the Corps' headquarters. He was appointed MBE for his war service in the King's Birthday honours in June 1945.

At the end of the war Wills fought Bridgwater as a Conservative candidate, but could not gain the seat from Vernon Bartlett who had won it as an 'Independent Progressive' in a 1938 byelection. He returned to the Bar, but at the 1950 general election, Wills was successful.

He was appointed an Assistant Government Whip in 1952, and was promoted to be Lord Commissioner of the Treasury in October 1954. He retained this position under Anthony Eden. When Harold Macmillan became Prime Minister, he appointed Wills as Comptroller of Her Majesty's Household (third highest in the Whip's Office). Wills left office in October 1958, was Knighted to mark his service in the 1958 Birthday Honours List and his death in 1969 caused a by-election.

Parliament of the United Kingdom
Preceded by Vernon Bartlett	Member of Parliament for Bridgwater; 1950–1969	Succeeded by Tom King
