= Robert Sanders, 1st Baron Bayford =

British barrister and politician (1867–1940)

Lieutenant-Colonel The Right Honourable The Lord Bayford TD PC JP DL
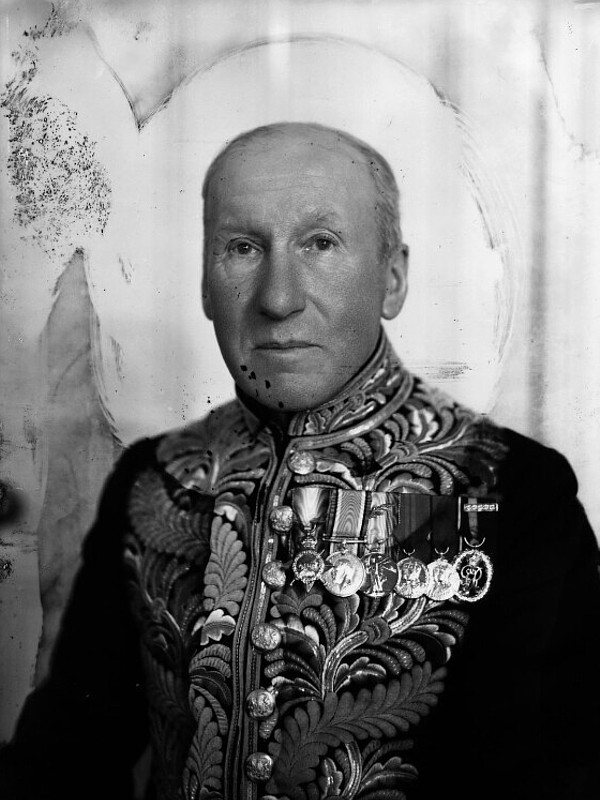
- Bayford in 1937

Treasurer of the Household
- In office 1918–1919
- Monarch: George V
- Prime Minister: David Lloyd George
- Preceded by: James Craig
- Succeeded by: Bolton Eyres-Monsell

Personal details
- Born: 20 June 1867
- Died: 24 February 1940 (aged 72)
- Spouse: Lucy Halliday (m. 1893-1940)
- Education: Balliol College, Oxford

Robert Arthur Sanders, 1st Baron Bayford, TD, PC, JP, DL (20 June 1867 – 24 February 1940) was an English barrister and politician.

== Background and education ==
The eldest of the three sons of Arthur Sanders, a barrister, of Fernhill, Wootton Bridge, Isle of Wight, Sanders was born at 27 Norfolk Square, Paddington, Middlesex. He was educated at Harrow and Balliol College, Oxford, where he graduated with first class honours in law. He joined the Inner Temple and was called to the bar in 1891.

== Political career ==
Sanders was Conservative Member of Parliament for Bridgwater, Somerset from 1910 until 1923. During this time he also served from 1911 to 1917 as a Lieutenant-Colonel with the Royal North Devon Yeomanry, serving at Gallipoli, and in Egypt and Palestine. He was appointed a deputy lieutenant of Somerset in 1912.

He was Treasurer of the Household (Government Deputy Chief Whip in the House of Commons), 1918–1919, and a junior Lord of the Treasury from 1919 until 1921. He then held ministerial office as Under-Secretary of State for War from 1921 to 1922 and Minister of Agriculture and Fisheries from 1922 to 1924. He was created a Baronet in the 1920 New Year Honours and appointed to the Privy Council in 1922, entitling him to the style "The Right Honourable".

He sat for Wells from 1924 to 1929, when he was raised to the peerage as Baron Bayford, of Stoke Trister in the County of Somerset.

== Personal life ==
Sanders married Lucy Sophia, daughter of William Halliday, in 1893. They had one son Arthur Sanders and two daughters. As his only son committed suicide in 1920, the title became extinct on Bayford's death in February 1940, aged 72. Lady Bayford died in September 1957.

== Honours ==

| Ribbon | Description | Notes |
| | Baronetcy (Bt) | 1920 New Years Honours List |
| | 1914–15 Star | |
| | British War Medal | |
| | WWI Victory Medal | With MID Oakleaf |
| | King George V Coronation Medal | 1911 |
| | King George V Silver Jubilee Medal | 6 May 1935 |
| | Territorial Decoration (TD) | With 1 Clasp; 20 years service in the Territorial Army. |

Coat of arms of Robert Sanders, 1st Baron Bayford
| Crest An elephant's head erased Sable tusked and charged on the neck with an escarbuncle Or. Escutcheon Per pale Argent and Sable three elephants' heads counterchanged tusks Or a bordure of the third. Supporters On the dexter side a hind and on the sinister side a stag both Proper each gorged with a colar pendent therefrom a portcullis Or. Motto Suum Cuique |

== Footnotes ==
Parliament of the United Kingdom
| Preceded by Henry Montgomery | Member of Parliament for Bridgwater; January 1910–1923 | Succeeded by William Morse |
| Preceded by Arthur Hobhouse | Member of Parliament for Wells; 1924–1929 | Succeeded by Anthony Muirhead |
Political offices
| Vacant Title last held by James Craig | Treasurer of the Household; 1918–1919 | Succeeded by Bolton Eyres-Monsell |
| Preceded by The Viscount Peel | Under-Secretary of State for War; 1921–1922 | Succeeded by Walter Guinness |
| Preceded by Arthur Griffith-Boscawen | Minister of Agriculture and Fisheries; 1922–1924 | Succeeded by Noel Buxton |
Peerage of the United Kingdom
| New creation | Baron Bayford; 1929–1940 | Extinct |
Baronetage of the United Kingdom
| New creation | Baronet (of Bayford); 1920–1940 | Extinct |
