= Maurice George Bisset =

Scottish feudal baron

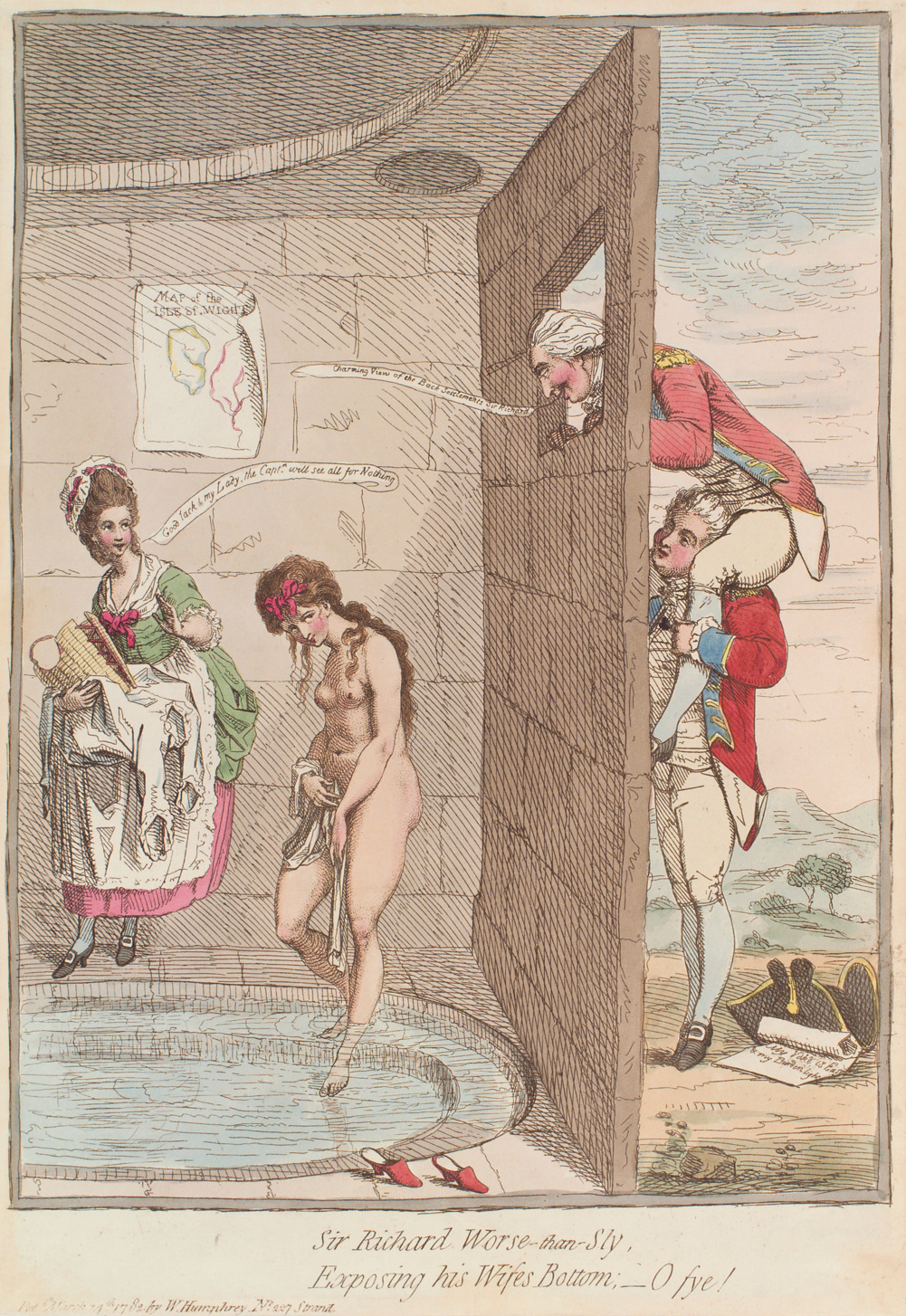
James Gillray cartoon: "Sir Richard Worse-than-sly, exposing his wife's bottom; – o fye!". Bisset sits atop Worsley's shoulders and looking through a window into a bath-house at his naked wife remarks to him "Charming view of the Back Settlements Sir Richard". Lady Worsley's maid says to her mistress "Good sack[?] to my Lady, the Capt'n will see all for nothing". On a parchment on the ground by Worsley's hat is written "My yoke is easy and my burden light" (Matthew 11:28–30). It was alleged in the court case that Worsley had displayed his wife naked to Bisset at the bath house in Maidstone

Maurice George Bisset (1757–1821) of Knighton Gorges on the Isle of Wight, and of Lessendrum in Aberdeen, Scotland, 18th Scottish feudal baron of Lessendrum, is famous for his involvement in the scandalous court case involving his mistress Seymour Dorothy Fleming (Lady Worsley) and her husband Sir Richard Worsley, 7th Baronet, of Appuldurcombe House, Isle of Wight. The case was the result of his affair with Lady Worsley, by whom he had a daughter, Jane Seymour Worsley, of whom Richard claimed paternity in order to avoid scandal.

== Origins ==
Maurice George Bisset was born in 1757 as a member of the Clan Bisset, the eldest son and heir of Rev. Alexander Bisset (the son of Major William Bisset, the second son of Alexander Bisset, 13th feudal baron of Lessendrum in Aberdeen, Scotland) by his wife Jane Bockland, daughter and heiress of Lieutenant-General Maurice Bocland (1695–1765) of Knighton Gorges, MP. "The Bissets of Lessendrum, one of the most ancient families in the county of Aberdeen, were in possession of that barony long before the War of Independence."

== Career ==
In 1765, aged 8, he inherited the estate and manor house of Knighton Gorges from his grandfather Lieutenant-General Maurice Bocland. He became a captain in the South Hampshire Militia, which covered the Isle of Wight. Bisset became a close friend of Sir Richard Worsley, his near neighbour on the Isle of Wight. As was revealed in the court case, with the encouragement of her husband, Bisset began an affair with Lady Worsley and in August 1781 she gave birth to his daughter, christened as Jane Seymour Worsley, whose paternity was nevertheless accepted by the baronet, to avoid scandal. In November 1781 Bisset ran away with her so she could escape her failing marriage with Sir Richard. They were however discovered and in February 1782 Worsley brought a criminal conversation legal action against Bisset seeking damages of £20,000 (2023: £2,790,000). Seymour, who was rumoured to have 27 lovers, turned the case against Sir Richard and made it clear that he had consented to and even encouraged the relationship between her and Bisset. This testimony destroyed Worsley's suit and the jury awarded him nominal damages of just one shilling (2023: £6.98).

== Marriage and issue ==
Seymour was unable to obtain a divorce from Richard, only a separation, meaning she could not remarry until he died. Because of this, Bisset eventually left Seymour, and went on in 1787 to marry Harriat Mordaunt, an illegitimate daughter of Charles Mordaunt, 4th Earl of Peterborough (by his mistress, and later second wife, Robiniana) by whom he had two daughters and co-heiresses:

- Jane Harriet Bissett (d.1866), 21st Scottish feudal baroness of Lessendrum who married her first cousin Venerable Maurice George Fenwick-Bisset (1797-1879), Archdeacon of Raphoe, who on his wife's inheritance of Lessendrum adopted the additional surname of Bisset. Her son was Mordaunt Fenwick Bisset (1825–1884) of Bagborough, Somerset, MP, 22nd Scottish feudal baron of Lessendrum and Master of the Devon and Somerset Staghounds, who inherited the manor of Dauntsey in Wiltshire, the seat of the Earls of Peterborough, from his childless great-uncle Charles Mordaunt, 5th Earl of Peterborough, 3rd Earl of Monmouth (1758–1814).
- Ann Bissett (d.1879).

== Death and succession ==
By 1818 he had moved to Bath in Wiltshire, as in his will dated in that year he describes himself as "late of Knighton but now resident in Bath". In 1820 his manor house of Knighton Gorges was burnt down and demolished, with no vestige remaining today. He died in 1821 at Lessendrum in Scotland, aged 64. He was succeeded as feudal baron of Lessendrum and in the estate of Knighton Gorges, according to entails, by his younger brother Rev. William Bissett (1758–1834), Bishop of Raphoe, 19th feudal baron, who died without issue when the barony was inherited by his nephew William Bisset, son of his younger brother Alexander Bisset.

His monument in Lessendrum Church is inscribed: "Sacred to the memory of Maurice George Bisset Esq., of Lessendrum who died at Lessendrum on the 16th December 1821 in the 64th year of his age. This tablet is jointly inscribed by Harriat, his affectionate and mournful widow, and his brother and immediate successor, William Lord Bishop of Raphoe, in honour of his name, and in grateful recollection of his many virtues that adorned his sacred character."

== In popular culture ==
Welsh actor Aneurin Barnard played Bisset in the 2015 BBC2 television film The Scandalous Lady W, based upon Hallie Rubenhold's book Lady Worsley's Whim.

The site of the manor house of Knighton Gorges has become famous as a supposedly haunted place and many unfounded stories have grown up concerning its history and demise. One of the latter is that Bisset himself demolished his house "out of spite because his daughter was marrying a clergyman, against his wishes, and he therefore prevented her from ever owning the manor". However, in his will, dated 1818, he provides generously for his two daughters and makes no mention of any intention to disinherit either. The stories often end with Bisset dying unhappily and alone in a cottage in the grounds of Knighton Gorges, but he died at Lessendrum in Scotland, as is stated on his monument in Lessendrum Church, still married to his long-term wife of 34 years Harriat, whom he calls in his will "my dear wife" and provides for generously. In his will he bequeathed to his wife Harriat "my manor of Shepton Mallet, Somerset, held on lease from the Duchy of Cornwall, in lieu of any annuity or rights of dower and hope she will give it at her death to our two daughters".
