= Knighton =

Knighton may mean:

== Places in England ==
- Knighton, Devon, a hamlet in the parish of Wembury
- Chudleigh Knighton, a village in Devon
- Knighton, West Dorset, a hamlet in the parish of Beer Hackett
- Knighton, Poole, Dorset, a hamlet near Canford Magna
- East Knighton, Dorset, a hamlet in the parish of Winfrith
- West Knighton, Dorset, a village near Dorchester
- Knighton, Isle of Wight, a hamlet
- Knighton, Leicester, Leicestershire, a suburb
- Knighton, Oxfordshire, a hamlet in the parish of Compton Beauchamp
- Knighton, Somerset, a hamlet in the parish of Stogursey
- Knighton, Newcastle-under-Lyme, Staffordshire, a hamlet in the parish of Loggerheads
- Knighton, Stafford, Staffordshire, a hamlet in the parish of Adbaston
- Knighton, Wiltshire, a hamlet in the parish of Ramsbury
- Knighton, Worcestershire, a hamlet in Inkberrow parish
- Knighton on Teme, Worcestershire, village and parish

== Places in Wales ==
- Knighton, Powys a market town on the English/Welsh border
  - Knighton railway station serving the town
  - Knighton Town F.C., its football club

== People ==
- Henry Knighton (d. 1396), English churchman and chronicler
- Arthur Henry Knighton-Hammond (1875–1970), English artist
- Brad Knighton (born 1985), American professional soccer player
- Brian Knighton (1971–2016), American professional wrestler better known as Axl Rotten
- Conor Knighton (born 1981), American actor, host, and television producer
- Dorothea Knighton (1780–1862), English artist
- Erriyon Knighton (born 2004), American sprinter
- Ken Knighton, English former footballer, coach and manager
- Michael Knighton, English businessman
- Rich Knighton (born 1969), senior Royal Air Force officer and engineer
- Robert Wesley Knighton (1941–2003), American serial killer
- Terrance O'Knighton (born 1986), American football coach and former defensive tackle
- William Knighton (1776 – 1836), English nobleman, Private Secretary to the Sovereign under George IV
- William C. Knighton (1864–1938), American architect
- William Myles Knighton (born 1931), British civil servant
- Zachary Knighton, American actor
- Tommy Knighton (1942 to 2017), American soul singer

== Other uses ==
- West Knighton (disambiguation), multiple uses
- Knighton Woods, part of Epping Forest near Buckhurst Hill in Essex, England
