= Mordaunt Bisset =

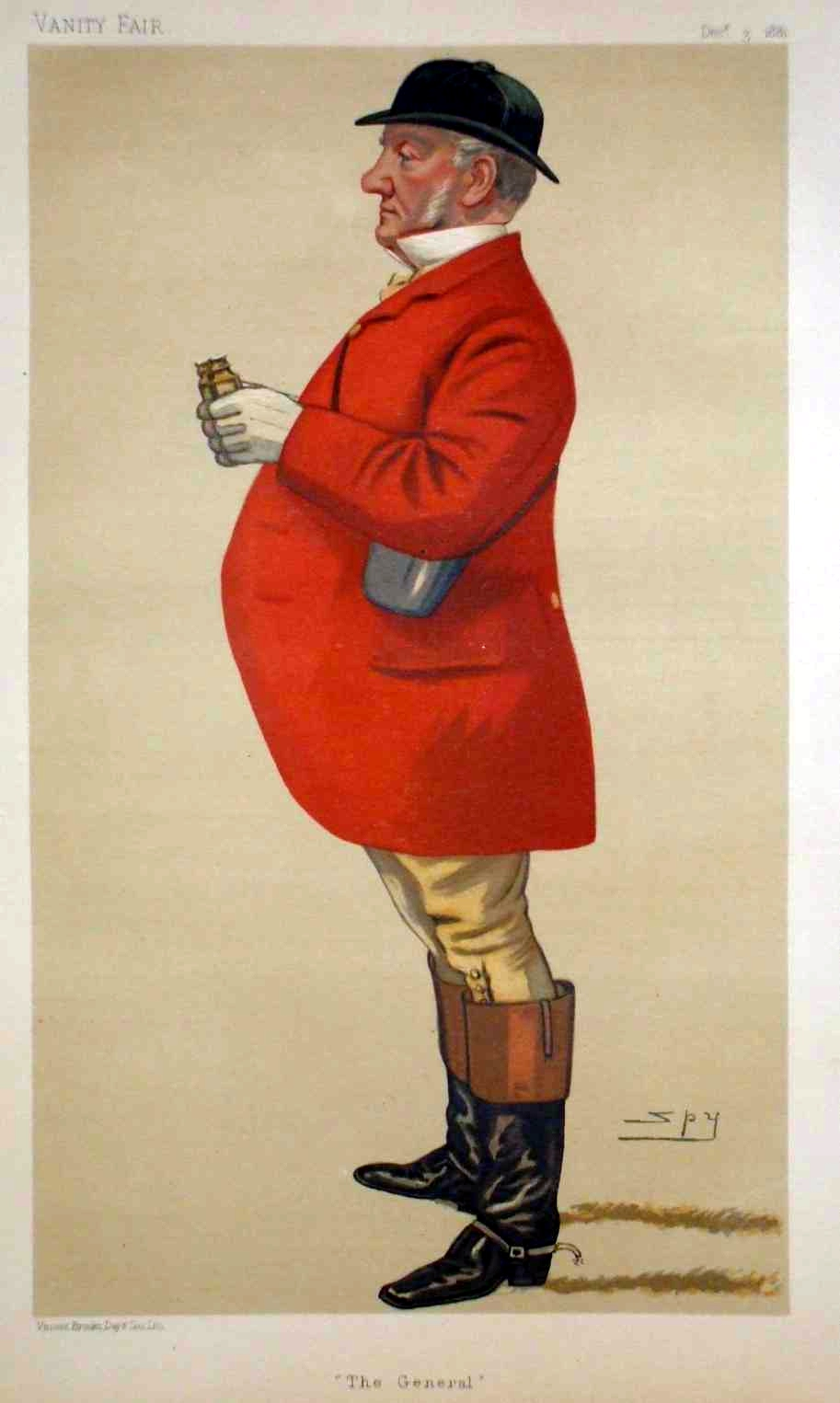
"The General" Bisset as caricatured by Spy in Vanity Fair, December 1881

Mordaunt Fenwick Bisset (1825 – 7 July 1884), of Bagborough, Somerset, was a British Conservative Member of Parliament and a famous west-country Master of Staghounds.

== Origins ==
He was the only son of the Venerable Maurice Fenwick Bisset (1797–1879), Rector of Drumholm and Archdeacon of Raphoe, both in County Donegal, Ireland, son of William Fenwick of Lemmington Hall, Edlingham, Northumberland, by his wife Elizabeth Bisset. Maurice had married his first cousin Jane Harriot Bisset (d.1866), the eldest daughter and co-heiress of Maurice George Bisset (1757–1821) of Knighton Gorges House, Isle of Wight, and of Lessendrum, Aberdeen, by his wife Harriat (sic) Mordaunt (b.1753) one of the illegitimate children of Charles Mordaunt, 4th Earl of Peterborough (1708–1779) by his mistress Robiniana Brown, who became his second wife in 1755.

Maurice Fenwick, his grandfather, adopted the additional name of Bisset following his wife's inheritance of the estate of Lessendrum from her cousin, not having inherited directly from her father due to entails which passed it first to two other male relatives, who died childless. His son Mordaunt Fenwick-Bisset inherited as well as Lessendrum, the residual estate, including the Wiltshire manor of Dauntsey, of Charles Mordaunt, 5th Earl of Peterborough (1758–1814), his natural great-uncle and the first legitimate son of the 4th Earl by Robiniana, who died without issue, and whose brothers, legitimate and otherwise, had all predeceased him. The titles all became extinct. The Mordaunt property was left to Jane in trust as a life-interest, which was inherited absolutely on her death in 1866 by her son Mordaunt.

== Career ==
He was elected as a member of parliament (MP) for West Somerset at the 1880 general election, but resigned from the House of Commons on 18 November 1883 by becoming Steward of the Manor of Northstead.

== Marriage ==
He married in 1851 Susan Popham, daughter and heiress of Francis Popham of Bagborough House, Bagborough, Somerset, and rented for his residence Pixton Park, near Dulverton, Somerset, from the Earl of Carnarvon, which is famous as the historic centre of West country staghunting when the seat of Sir Thomas Dyke Acland, 7th Baronet (1722-1785) of Killerton, Devon and Petherton Park in Somerset, who acquired Pixton by his marriage to the heiress Elizabeth Dyke (d.1753) and who in 1746 took over mastership of the Staghounds following the death of Edward Dyke. He had no surviving progeny by Susan Popham and his heir was his sister Janet.

== Sporting career ==
He served as Master of the Devon and Somerset Staghounds from 1855 to 1881. He accepted the mastership when west-country stag-hunting was at a low ebb. In 1824 the entire pack of staghounds, of an ancient native bloodline, was sold by a previous master to a German Baron. Following this action, the wild deer were almost poached to extinction, the lack of sport having removed the main reason for their preservation in the eyes of the hard-pressed farmers whose crops they damaged. Mr Froude Bellew, MFH, offered a draught from his own pack of foxhounds to anyone who would re-established a pack of staghounds. Mr Bisset accepted the offer. His mastership was instrumental in increasing wild red deer numbers on Exmoor, he improved the breeding of the hounds and built permanent new kennels at Exford, which he donated to the Committee. In 1878 an outbreak of rabies occurred in the kennels, and he took the difficult decision to put-down all the hounds on 22 January 1879. He immediately started a new pack the same year, made up from a draught from Lord Rothschild's Staghounds. He left 13 large volumes of his hunting diaries which became the property of Viscount Ebrington, later 4th Earl Fortescue his successor as Master, whose brother Hon. John Fortescue used them as a basis for his work Record of Staghunting on Exmoor, London, 1887.

== Portraits ==
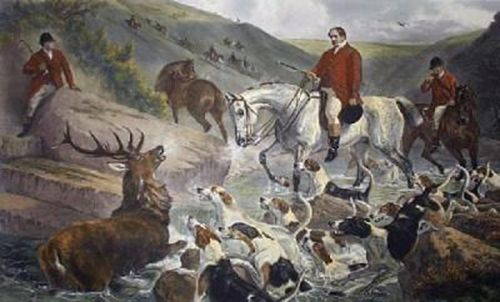
Portrait of Mordaunt Fenwick-Bisset by Samuel John Carter, 1871, scene at Badgworthy Water, Exmoor

His portrait was painted by Samuel John Carter and was exhibited at the Royal Academy of Arts in London in 1871, under the catalogue description: "A September evening, Exmoor Forest". A wild stag at bay with portraits; to be presented to the master of the Devon and Somerset Staghounds, Mordaunt Fenwick-Bisset Esq., at the beginning of his seventeenth season by upwards of 400 deer preservers and friends". The painting was presented to him at a dinner at Dunster on 14 September 1871. He is shown on his hunter Chanticleer surrounded by his favourite hounds, with a stag at bay at Badgworthy Water, Exmoor Forest. An engraving of Bisset standing on a North Devon beach watching a hunted stag swimming away into the sea is published in Fortescue, op.cit., opposite p. 87, with the caption: And there stood the stalwart form of Mr Bisset.

== Death and burial ==
He died on 7 July 1884 at Bagborough House and was buried at Bagborough.

== Sources ==
- Marshall, H.J. Exmoor Sporting and Otherwise, London, 1948
- Fortescue, Hon. John. Record of Staghunting on Exmoor, London, 1887
- Temple, Rev. William. The Thanage of Fermartyn, quoted on rootsweb.ancestry.com

Parliament of the United Kingdom
Preceded by Hon. Arthur Hood; Vaughan Lee	Member of Parliament for West Somerset; 1880 – 1883; With: Vaughan Lee to 1882; Edward Stanley from 1882	Succeeded by Charles Elton; Edward Stanley
