= William Knighton (disambiguation) =

Sir William Knighton (1776–1836) was Private Secretary to the Sovereign, George IV.

William Knighton may also refer to:

- William C. Knighton (1864–1938), American architect
- Sir William Wellesley Knighton, 2nd Baronet (1811–1885) of the Knighton baronets
- William Myles Knighton (1931–2023), British civil servant
- William Knighton LLD (1823 – 1901) Author, Educator, Indian Civil Servant - Wikipedia article in preparation
