= Aboyne Castle =

Castle in Aberdeenshire, Scotland

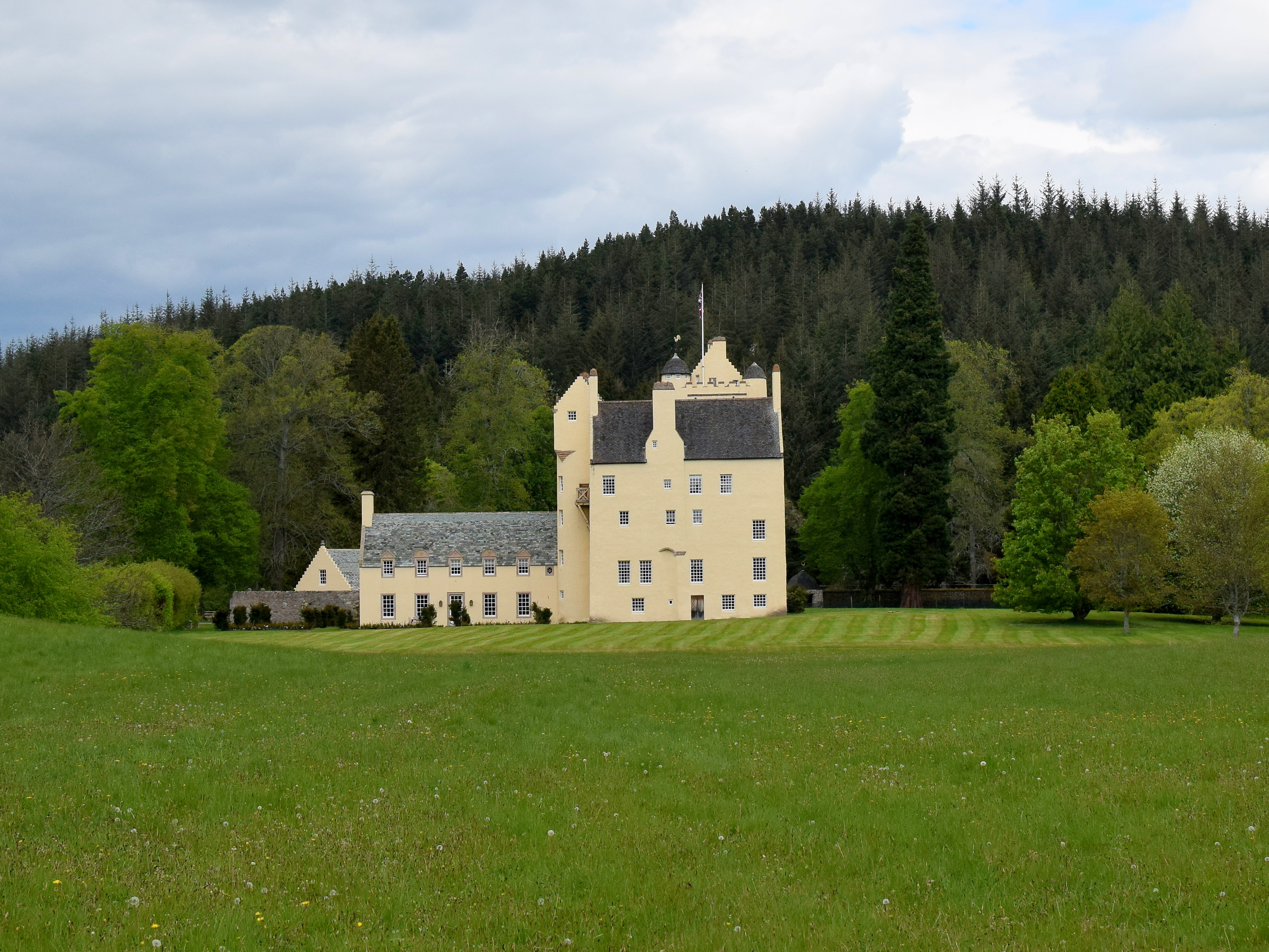
- Aboyne Castle in 2021

- Location within Aberdeenshire

General information
- Location: Aboyne, Aberdeenshire, Scotland
- Coordinates: 57.0846°N 2.7833°W

Aboyne Castle is a 13th-century castle in Aberdeenshire, Scotland 0.75 mi (1.21 km) north of the town of Aboyne (Grid Reference NO5299). The location of Aboyne Castle was selected for its strategic position near the River Dee and controlling the northern end of one of the Mounth crossings. Aboyne Castle was formerly derelict, but was restored by the present Marquess of Huntly in 1979.

== Architecture ==
The castle was constructed by the Bysets, lords of Strathdee and Aboyne, before 1233, as a motte and bailey. Edward I sent instructions for its fortification in 1307. It was later turned into a stone keep. In 1671, Charles Gordon, 1st Earl of Aboyne rebuilt the west wing as a tower house, parts of which are still visible. His son, the 2nd Earl, added a mansion house in 1701: George Gordon, 9th Marquess of Huntly added an east wing in 1801. In 1869, kitchen improvements were made using granite and stepped gables. The Mansion House was updated in the 1880s by Sir Cunliffe Brooks by adding baronial-style ornamentation. George Truefitt did some restoration work in the later part of the 19th century. The castle was remodelled in 1986 by Ian Begg.

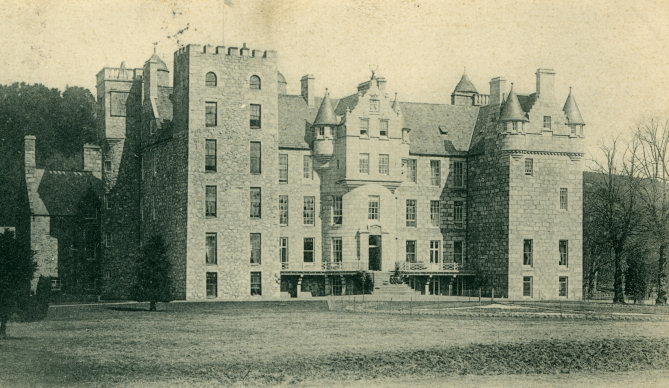
Historical picture of the castle

The structure is three storeys with a basement and attic. The east elevation is symmetrical, while the north (entrance), south, and west are asymmetrical. A heraldic panel is located between the second and third windows of the north elevation, as is a decorative ironwork finial and a weathercock finial. There is a baronial tower house, an angled tower to the north-west, a four-storey basement, and an attic tower to the north. The oldest section of the castle is the north-west which incorporates a balustrade atop a five-storey circular tower that is corbelled to square. This tower was replicated later at the north-east. The castle is harled and lime washed. Eaves are courses, there are several turrets, a possible secret passageway, and a monk's room.

There are a number of small-pane windows, as well as a grey slate roof with tiled ridge. A doorway to the principal floor is reached by stone steps, and a small-pane glazed timber door is located to the right of the basement. Immediately to the north of the castle, there is a harled wall with an enclosed courtyard.

== Ownership ==
In 1242, after the expulsion from Scotland of John and Walter Byset of Clan Bissett, who had been accused of the murder of Patrick, Earl of Atholl, at Haddington, East Lothian, Aboyne Castle passed to the Knights Templar in that year. It passed next to the Frasers of Cowie, before passing yet again, this time by marriage, to Sir William de Keith, Great Marischal of Scotland, around 1355. In 1449, Keith's great-granddaughter, Joan, brought the castle by marriage to Alexander Gordon, 1st Earl of Huntly (1449). Its present owner is the Marquess of Huntly, whose family has owned it since the early 15th century.

== Grounds ==
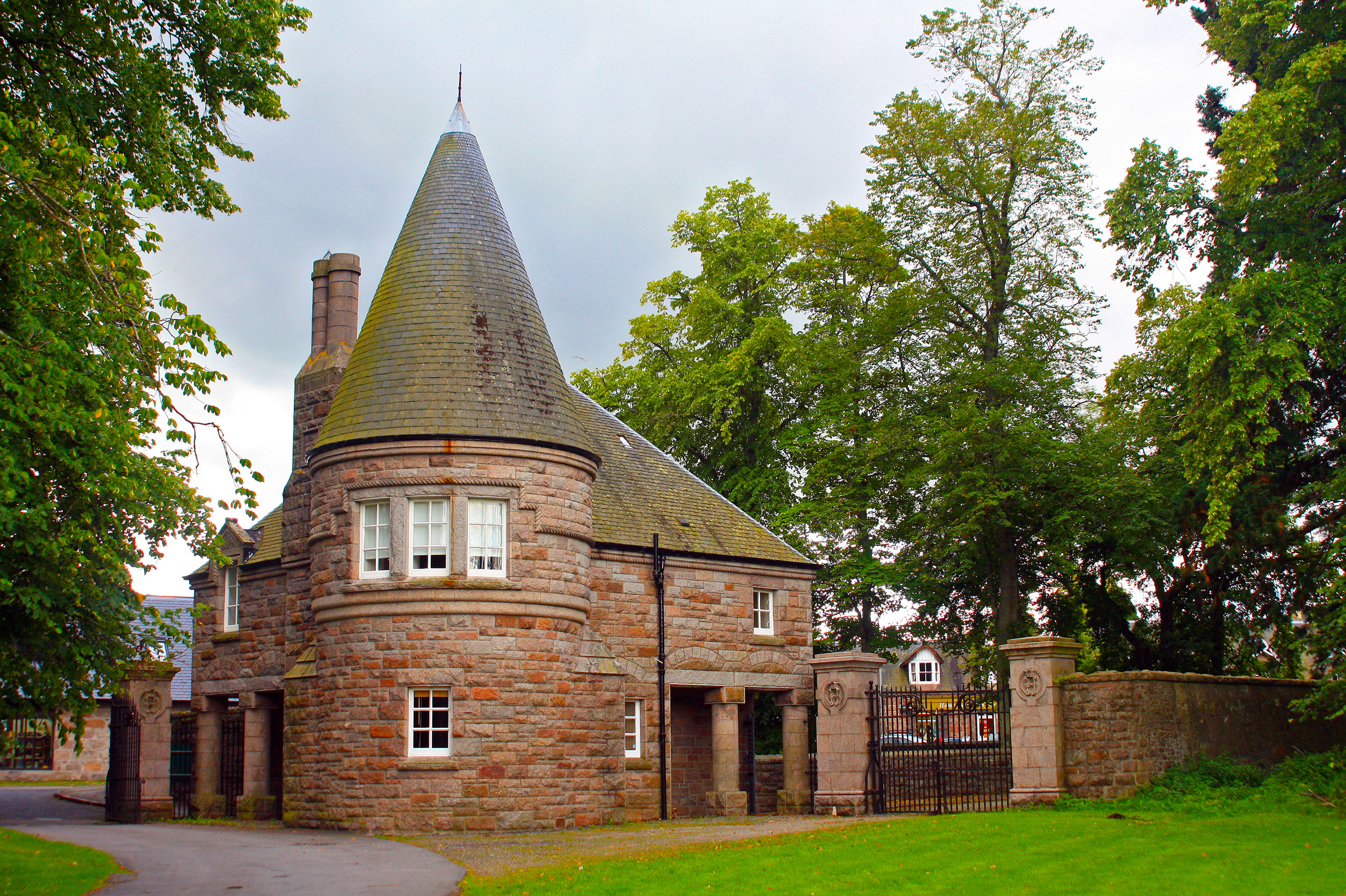
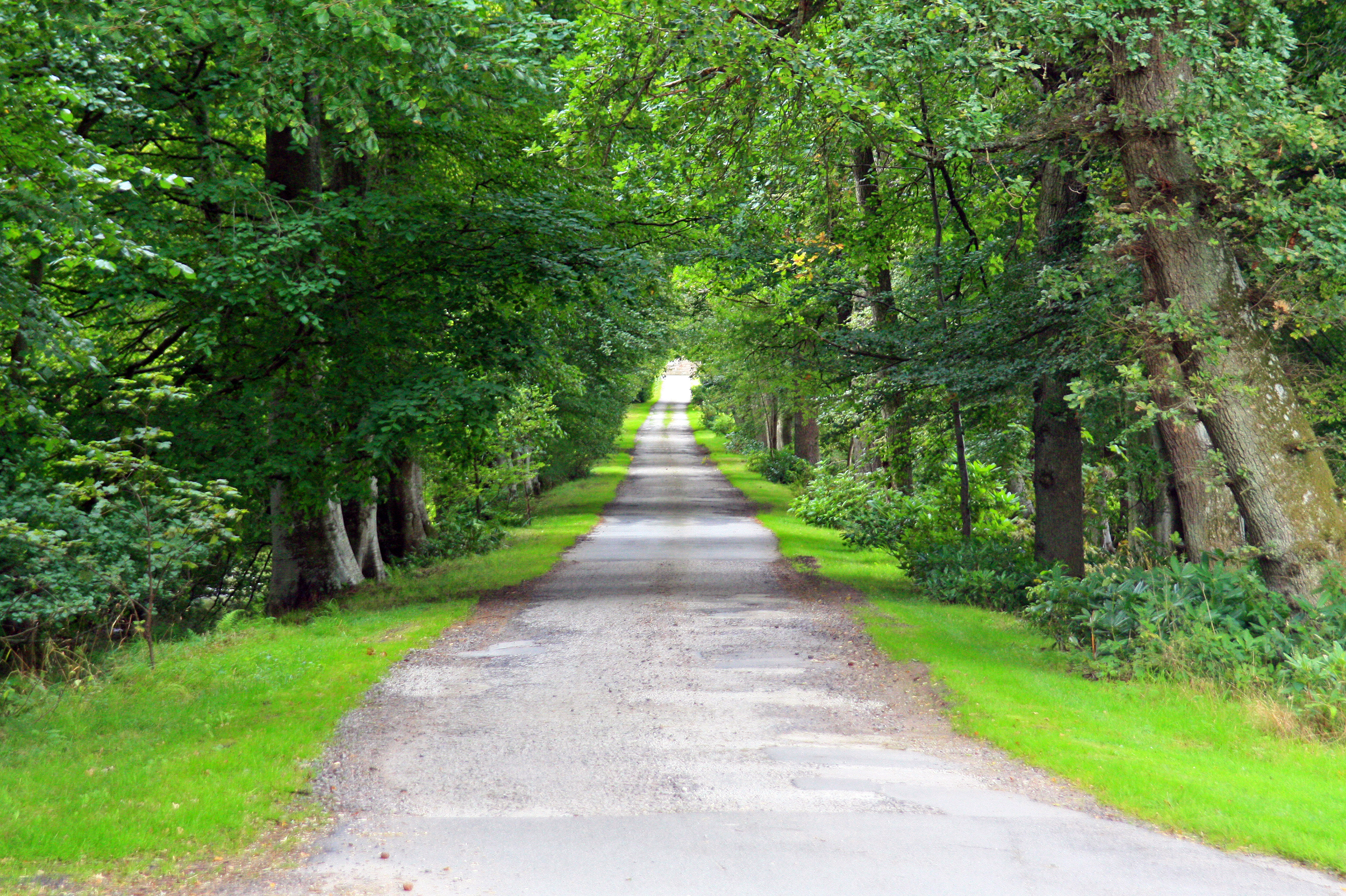
Left: Gatehouse; Right: Entrance driveway

There is a large extent of planted policies on both sides of the River Dee, including ornamental plantations and the Loch of Aboyne.

On the Upper Dee, Aboyne Castle grounds are used as a fly-fishing fish beat. It is fished in agreement with Glen Tanar Estate (Craigendinnie Beat). Within the Aboyne Castle Policies, there is included an artificial, islet-studded Loch of Aboyne measuring 3 × 2 1/3 fur. The burn of Aboyne has kept its ancient name, Allach, only near the castle where the Allach Bridge was built over the burn.

A nineteenth century cowstead on the estate has been upgraded as an entertainment venue as Coos' Cathedral, specialising in weddings. It was the location used for the ceremonies in Love Is Blind: UK Season 2.

== Relic ==
The Formaston Stone, a relic of historical importance, is preserved. Dating from between 800 and 1000, it has a mirror symbol, a decorated Celtic cross, and an Ogham inscription.

== Preservation ==
Aboyne Castle, including its gateway, courtyard, and northern boundary walls became a category B listed building on 24 November 1972. Several other structures became listed building such as the early 19th century walled garden, garden house and the Wee House, listed at category C(s) on 30 March 2000; and the triple span, segmental-arched Allach Bridge, constructed in 1787 of coursed grey granite, category B on 30 March 2000.
