= Nicholas Ridley =

Nicholas Ridley may refer to:

- Nicholas Ridley (martyr) (died 1555), English clergyman
- Nicholas Ridley-Colborne, 1st Baron Colborne (1779–1854), British politician
- Henry Nicholas Ridley (1855–1956), English botanist
- Nicholas Ridley, Baron Ridley of Liddesdale (1929–1993), British politician
