= Dorothea Knighton =

English painter (1780–1862)

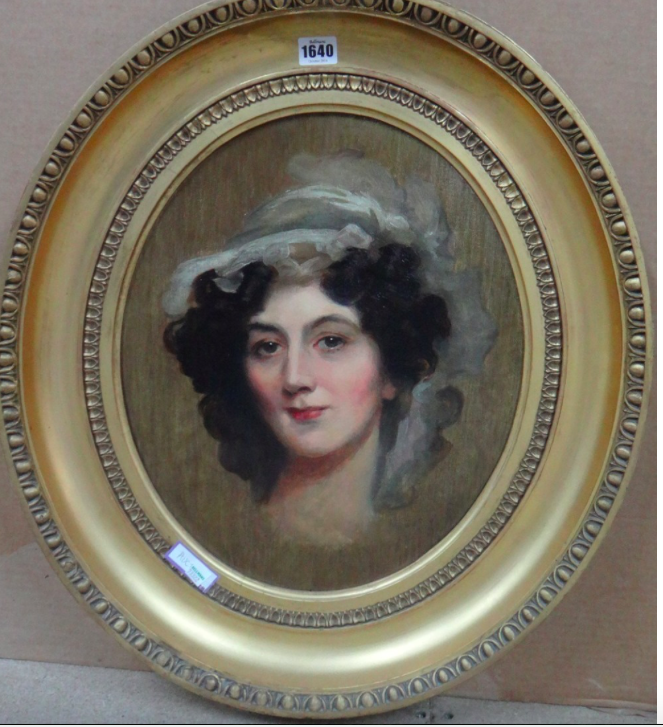
Portrait of Dorothea Lady Knighton after Sir Thomas Lawrence, Bellmans Auctioneers, Sussex

Dorothea Lady Knighton (1780–1862) was an artist who wrote the Memoirs of Sir William Knighton, Bart, GCH, Keeper of the Privy Purse during the reign of His Majesty King George the Fourth. Including his correspondence with many distinguished persons (1838). She married William Knighton, who would become surgeon to King George IV and executor of his will. She had four children, two daughters and two sons. Her eldest child, a son, died in infancy.

== Life ==
Knighton was born in 1780, the youngest of five daughters of Dorothy (née Hill) and Captain James Hawker RN. She was baptised at the church of Charles the Martyr, Plymouth on 10 February 1780. She had three brothers, the youngest of whom, Edward Hawker, became an admiral. The Knighton family was a well-respected and connected family in Plymouth, where her father held property at Mount Gould and in Caskin Street with a lease on a timber yard at Britton Side. Her sister Sarah married into the Luscombe family and her other three sisters married officers in the Royal Navy.

She married William Knighton, then a physician, at the church of Charles the Martyr Plymouth on 4 August 1800. He was a man of humble background who would rise to become surgeon to King George IV, the Keeper of the Privy Purse and an executor of George IV's will. She who was "accomplished and well-educated", "had travelled in Europe without Knighton" and was described by her husband's friends as "a woman of intelligence and integrity."

In 1804 the Knightons moved to Edinburgh, where her husband pursued further medical studies at the University of Edinburgh. They lodged in Edinburgh with Mrs McGilvray. After her husband received a medical degree from the University of Aberdeen, the couple moved to London in 1806. There they leased 9 Hanover Square in 1807, which had previously been owned by Dr Robert Halifax, a physician to George, Prince of Wales.

Her husband accompanied Richard Wellesley as his personal physician to Spain in 1809 where Wellesley held the post of Spanish Ambassador. Wellesley later introduced William to the Royal Household and would become Foreign Secretary.

Although Knighton was initially reluctant for her husband to enter the Royal Household, she later persuaded her husband "that it would be improper for him to resign while he still held George's confidence".

The family acquired Sherwood Lodge, which was "a villa on the banks of the Thames at Battersea set in six acres of pleasure grounds." The house's grand interior was described in a sale catalogue when the Knightons sold it in 1820.

In 1812, her husband became a baronet and she became Lady Knighton.

In May 1820 her husband purchased Blendworth Cottage in Blendworth, Hampshire. Her sisters lived nearby. Her sister Jane had married Captain Sir Michael Seymour in 1798 and then lived at nearby Blendworth House.

When Knighton died in 1836, she was in her fifties. Rather than entrust the task of writing the memoirs of her husband to another, she edited his journals, diaries and correspondence and wrote the Memoirs of Sir William Knighton.

Knighton died in 1862 at the age of 82 and was buried at Holy Trinity in Blendworth.

== Children ==
Knighton had four children. In the summer of 1801 her first son almost died from convulsions but survived only to die on 20 January 1802. Her elder daughter, Dorothea Knighton (1807–1875), married Captain Michael Seymour in 1829. Their son William Wellesley Knighton (1811–1885) was named after Richard Wellesley. Her younger daughter was Mary Frances Knighton (1816–?).

== Memoirs ==
Knighton wrote her husband's Memoirs with his approval and published the book after his death. Her husband hoped that her " 'little book' would prove comforting and consolatory to those for whom it was intended." It was never intended for publication. After his death Knighton edited his journals and correspondence and "limited her contribution to family and personal details with no comment on the events in which her husband was involved." "This makes parts of the Memoirs incomprehensible to most modern readers ... without background information." She edited entries in the diary to protect the privacy of friends and family and to preserve the confidentiality that Knighton had exercised throughout his life. Her husband had "been mistaken about his family history ... and as a result the Memoirs misrepresented his early life." The publication of the Memoirs was "allegedly awaited with a mixture of apprenshension and relish but, as one reviewer observed, the good feeling of Knighton's family prevented it from containing the information that people most wanted to read."

== Artistic works ==
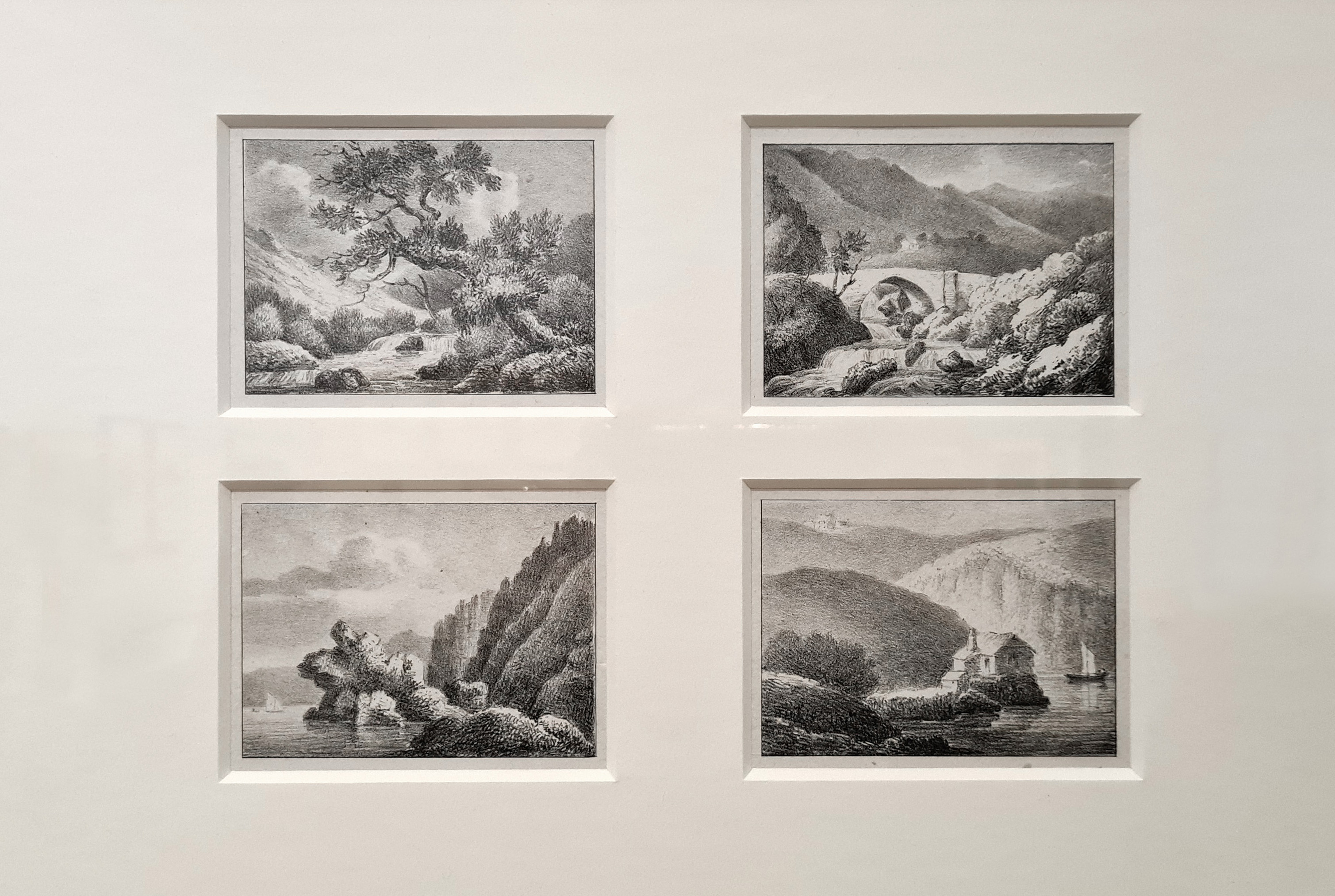
Landscape Scenes

Knighton was a talented painter. She was encouraged by the artist James Northcote RA, another Plymouth-born artist. "She exhibited in early life considerable talent in the execution of works, representing the beauty of Devonshire scenery, and a ready hand for grouping figures in genre compositions. She was also successful in portraits as evidenced by a painting .. of Nickie Glubb, a famous pugilist, and leader in the boisterous struggles for supremacy between the Old Town Boys and Burton boys." In Old Plymouth there used to be a fight on the steps of the Guildhall to win a barrel of beer placed on the upper step. "Through the pluck and strength of Nicki Glubb, the Ajax of the quay" his side normally won, but one year an unfair fighter concealed a stone in his hand and destroyed Glubb's eyesight. She painted his marred features.

== In art ==
George Engleheart, miniature painter to George II, painted a miniature of the family in 1807.

She was also painted by Sir Thomas Lawrence.
