= William Bissett =

William Bissett may refer to:

- William Davidson Bissett (1893–1971), Scottish recipient of the Victoria Cross
- William Bissett (bishop) (1758–1834), Anglican bishop in the Church of Ireland
- William Bisset, 13th-14th century Scottish knight, Sheriff of Sterling (1304–1305)
- Bill Bissett (born 1939), Canadian poet

== See also ==
- Bill Bisset (1867–1958), South African rugby player
