= Ivo de Morville =

13th century English noble

- Noble family: Morville family

Ivo de Morville (died c. 1237), Lord of Knighton, Bradpole and Wraxall, was an English noble.

He was the eldest son of William de Morville.

== Marriage and issue ==
Ivo married, Isabella, of unknown parentage and had the following known issue:

- Matilda de Morville, married Matthew de Columbariis, had issue.
- Elena de Morville, married to Ralph de Gorges, had issue.

He also fathered an illegitimate daughter, Christina who married Ralph de Karcia.
