= John Edwards-Vaughan =

John Edwards-Vaughan, also known as John Edwards (29 March 1772 – 16 August 1833) was a Welsh politician who sat in the House of Commons in two periods between 1818 and 1832.

He was the son of John Edwards of Belvedere House, Lambeth, Surrey, who had bought an estate in the Neath valley and built Rheola House to a design by John Nash. John Edwards senior died in 1818, and his son inherited his estate, and took the additional name of Vaughan in 1829 as a beneficiary of the will of William Vaughan of Glanelai, Glamorgan.

Edwards-Vaughan was elected unopposed as the Member of Parliament (MP) for Glamorganshire at the general election in 1818, but when he stood as a Whig at the 1820 general election, he was defeated by the Tory candidate.

He was appointed High Sheriff of Glamorgan for 1823–24 and was elected to the House of Commons as a Tory at the 1830 general election, when he was elected as the MP for Wells, having stood unsuccessfully in 1826. He was re-elected unopposed in 1831, but was defeated at the 1832 general election.

Edwards-Vaughan married twice: firstly Ann, the daughter and heiress of Thomas Williams of Court Herbert, Glamorgan and secondly Sarah, the daughter and heiress of Daniel Parkin and his wife Sarah Barwis of London, and widow of James Dalton of Russell Square, Middlesex, with whom he had a son and a daughter. Their daughter Jessie married his fellow MP at Wells, John Lee Lee and their son Vaughan Hanning Vaughan-Lee sat as an MP after serving in the Crimean War.

Parliament of the United Kingdom
Preceded by Sir Christopher Cole	Member of Parliament for Glamorganshire; 1818 – 1820	Succeeded by Sir Christopher Cole
Preceded by John Paine Tudway; Charles William Taylor	Member of Parliament for Wells; 1830 – 1832; With: John Lee Lee	Succeeded by Norman Lamont; John Lee Lee
