= Scott Harte =

Anglican priest

Matthew Scott Harte is an Anglican priest: he was Archdeacon of Raphoe in the Province of Armagh in the Church of Irelandfrom 1983 until 2013.

Harte was born in 1946, educated at Trinity College, Dublin and ordained in 1971. He was curate at Bangor Abbey then Ballynafeigh before becoming the incumbent at Ardara in 1976. In 1998 he was inducted at Holy Trinity, Dunfanaghy; and retired in 2013. He was Prebendary of Howth at St Patrick's Cathedral, Dublin from 2007 to 2013.
