= Anthony Traill =

Anthony Traill may refer to:

- Anthony Traill (college provost) (1838–1914), provost of Trinity College Dublin
- Anthony Traill (linguist) (1939–2007), South African linguist
- Anthony Traill (priest) (1755–1831), rector of Skull and Archdeacon of Connor in Ireland, father of Robert Traill
