= Leeds baronets =

Baronetcy in the Baronetage of the United Kingdom

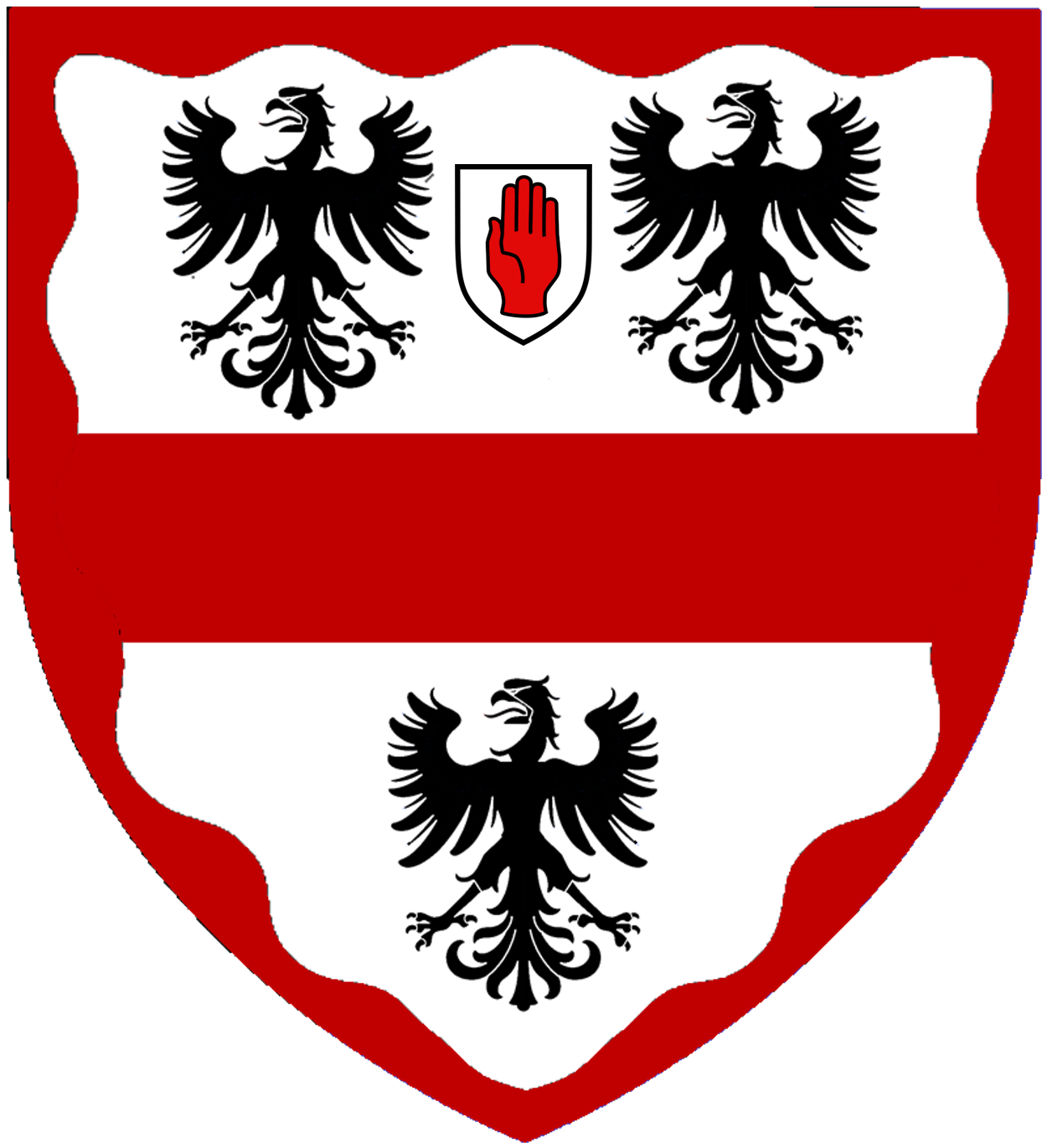
Arms of Leeds: Argent, a fess gules between three eagles displayed sable a bordure wavy of the second, here with an inescutcheon of a baronet, a Red Hand of Ulster; crest: A Staff raguly fessways vert thereon a cock gules wings expanded combed wattled beaked and legged or the whole debruised by a bendlet sinister ermine; motto: Vigilate (Watch ye!)

The Leeds Baronetcy, of Croxton Park in the County of Cambridge, is a title in the Baronetage of the United Kingdom. It was created on 31 December 1812 for George Leeds. He was an equerry to Prince Augustus Frederick, Duke of Sussex. The Croxton Park estate in Cambridgeshire had been in the Leeds family since circa 1568. As of 2011 the presumed ninth and present Baronet, a resident of Canada, has not successfully proven his succession and is not on the Official Roll of the Baronetage.

== Leeds baronets, of Croxton Park (1812) ==
- Sir George William Leeds, 1st Baronet (1773–1838)
- Sir Joseph Edward Leeds, 2nd Baronet (1798–1862)
- Sir Edward Leeds, 3rd Baronet (1825–1876)
- Sir George Augustus Leeds, 4th Baronet (1849–1894)
- Sir Edward Templer Leeds, 5th Baronet (1859–1924)
- Sir Reginald Arthur St John Leeds, 6th Baronet (1899–1970)
- Sir George Graham Mortimer Leeds, 7th Baronet (1927–1983)
- Sir Christopher Anthony Leeds, 8th Baronet (1935–2009)
- John Charles Hildyard Leeds, presumed 9th Baronet (born 1941) The baronetcy is listed as dormant on the Official Roll of the Baronetage, the presumed 9th Baronet not having proved his succession.

The presumed heir apparent to the baronetcy is Michael John Hildyard Leeds (born 1975), only son of the 9th Baronet.

Coat of arms of Leeds baronets
Crest A Staff raguly fessways Vert thereon a Cock Gules wings expanded combed wattled beaked and legged Or the whole debruised by a Bendlet Sinister Ermine Escutcheon Argent a Fess Gules between three Eagles displayed Sable a Bordure wavy of the second Motto Vigilate (Watch ye!)

== Notes ==
Baronetage of the United Kingdom
Preceded by Mackintosh baronets	Leeds baronets of Croxton Park; 31 December 1812	Succeeded by Knighton baronets
