= John Lee Lee =

British Whig politician (1802–1874)

The Right Honourable John Lee Lee

Member of Parliament for Wells
- In office 1830–1837 Serving with John Edwards-Vaughan, Norman Lamont
- Preceded by: John Paine Tudway; Charles William Taylor
- Succeeded by: William Goodenough Hayter; Richard Blakemore

Personal details
- Born: John Lee Hanning; 11 December 1802
- Died: 16 August 1874 (aged 71)
- Party: Whig
- Spouse(s): Jessy Edwards-Vaughan (m. 1834; died 1836) Hon. Mary Sophia Hood (m. 1841; died 1874)
- Children: 5, including Vaughan
- Parent(s): William Hanning; Harriett Lee
- Education: Westminster School
- Alma mater: Christ Church, Oxford

John Lee Lee (né Hanning; 11 December 1802 – 16 August 1874) of Orleigh Court in the parish of Buckland Brewer in Devon, and of Dillington House, near Ilminster in Somerset, was a British Whig politician who was Member of Parliament for Wells.

== Early life ==
Born John Lee Hanning on 11 December 1802, he was the only son, and heir, of William Hanning (d. 1834) of Dillington House, near Ilminster in Somerset, and Harriett Lee, daughter of Edward Lee of Pinhoe, Devon.

In 1819 at the age of 17, by the will of his uncle, Maj. Edward Lee, who died in 1819, he inherited several estates, including Orleigh. Under the terms of the bequest he adopted the surname Lee by royal license dated 21 March 1825. He let Orleigh to his brother-in-law, William Speke, of Jordans near Ilminster (father of the River Nile explorer John Hanning Speke) and made his own residence at Dillington.

He was educated at Westminster School and matriculated at Christ Church, Oxford in 1821.

== Career ==
In 1830, he was elected one of the Members of Parliament for Wells, and held the seat until 1837.

He also served as Sheriff of Somerset from 1845 to 1846.

== Personal life ==
Lee married twice. His first marriage was in 1834 to Jessy Edwards-Vaughan (d. 1836), the daughter of John Edwards-Vaughan of Rheola who was his fellow MP for Wells from 1830 to 1832. By her he had one son:

- Vaughan Hanning Vaughan-Lee (1836–1882), who became Conservative MP for West Somerset; he married Clara Elizabeth Moore, a daughter of George Moore of Appleby Hall, in 1861.

His second marriage, in 1841, was to Hon. Mary Sophia Hood (d. 1888), daughter of Samuel Hood, 2nd Baron Bridport (1788–1868) and Charlotte Mary Nelson, suo jure 3rd Duchess of Bronte in Sicily (an Italian title). Together, they were the parents of two sons and two daughters, including:

- Emily Mary Lee (c. 1842–1893), who married Thomas Spragging Godfrey of Balderton Hall, Nottinghamshire, in 1864. After his death in 1877, she married Maj.-Gen. Henry Lowther Balfour of the Royal Artillery in 1882.
- Alice Georgina Lee (1844–1860), who died unmarried.
- Edward Hanning-Lee (1845–1916), a Colonel who married Georgiana Emma Marjoribanks, daughter of Edward Marjoribanks.
- William Hanning-Lee (1846–1912), who married Emilie Georgiana Bond in 1877.

He died on 16 August 1874 at the age of 71. His widow died on 29 January 1888.

Parliament of the United Kingdom
Preceded by John Paine Tudway; Charles William Taylor	Member of Parliament for Wells; 1830 – 1837; With: John Edwards-Vaughan to 1832; Norman Lamont from 1832	Succeeded by William Goodenough Hayter; Richard Blakemore
