= Rheola House =

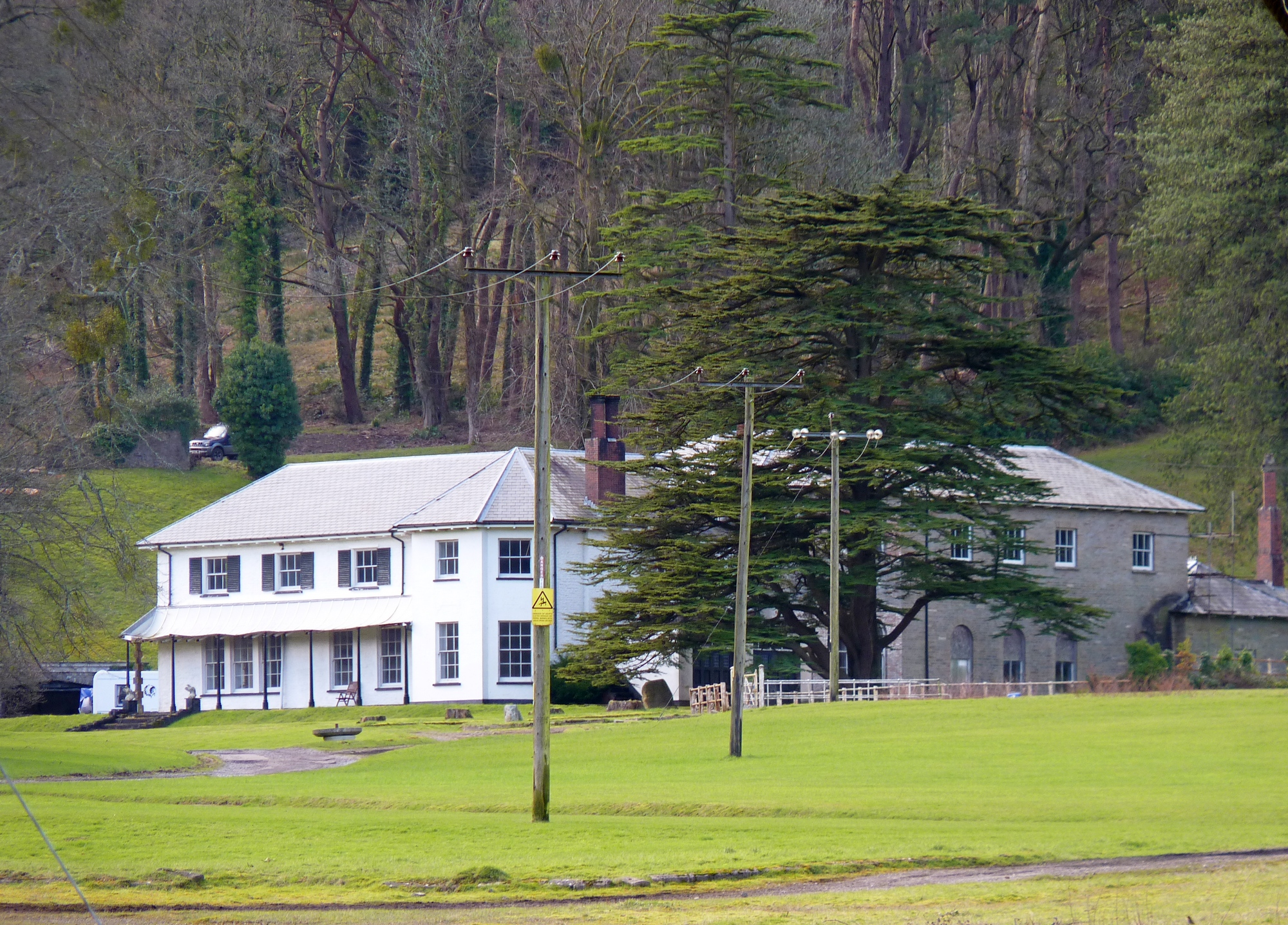

- Location within Neath Port Talbot
- 51.72457°N 3.68298°W
- Type: House
- Location: Resolven, Neath Port Talbot

History
- Built: 1812-18

Site notes
- Architect: John Nash
- Architectural style: rustic picturesque
- Owner: Howard Rees

Listed Building – Grade II*
- Official name: Rheola House, Glynneath
- Designated: 1973
- Reference no.: 11771

Rheola House was a Grade II* listed country house between Glynneath and Resolven, in the Neath valley, South Wales. Designed by John Nash, it was built between 1812 and 1814 for Nash's cousin, John Edwards. It passed through inheritance to members of the Edwards, Vaughan, and Lee families, until in 1939, with the house becoming run down, it was bought by an aluminium company for use as offices, and part of the land was put to industrial uses. In 2012 an application was made for housing on the industrialised area, to enable restoration of the house and a leisure complex to sustain the estate. In 2024 an application was made to develop a hotel and spa on the site.

The gardens and park around the house are designated Grade II on the Cadw/ICOMOS Register of Parks and Gardens of Special Historic Interest in Wales.

On the evening of 18 August 2026 the house was destroyed by fire. On 27 August five people were charged with reckless arson endangering life.

== Origins ==
There was a water mill in the vicinity of the current house in Norman times or earlier, utilising the power of Rheola Brook. A later mill building still stands near the house, although it not certain that it is on the same location. In 1296 it was documented as having formerly been a grange of Neath Abbey, known as Hirrole Grange, forerunner of the present name. By the late 18th century, there was a farmhouse on the site, and was part of the huge estates of Sir Herbert Mackworth of Gnoll Castle.

== Edwards family ==
In 1800, John Edwards of Belvedere House, Lambeth, Surrey (d, 1818), an engineer with family links to the area, was able to buy 120 acres of land, including Rheola farmhouse, to provide himself with a Welsh estate, with extended family living around south and west Wales. His son, also named John Edwards (although later to change his name to John Edwards-Vaughan) (1772 – 1833), was a successful solicitor and land agent. He took on the task of developing the farmhouse into a picturesque villa, for which he used his cousin, the fashionable architect John Nash.

=== John Nash ===
John Nash had begun a promising architectural career in London, but had become bankrupt in 1793. The following year he went to live in Carmarthen, where his mother was living, and over the next 13 years, established himself as an architect of provincial public buildings and private houses. During this time he got to know Uvedale Price, the enthusiast for the Picturesque. Also working in partnership with the landscape architect Humphry Repton, these influences gave Nash a new direction to his architecture. In 1794 he returned to London, and developed a practice as a fashionable exponent of the Picturesque style. John Edwards junior was by this point in close contact with Nash, handling all his legal affairs through his London solicitors practice. By 1809, when the Edwardses were looking to re-build Rheola farmhouse, it is John Nash that they turned to. This was one of his last private commissions, as from 1810 Nash was almost exclusively occupied in works for the Prince Regent.

In 1811 John Edwards junior had a son, Nash Vaughan Edwards, named after both his cousin and a fellow lawyer who became the family's benefactor. The work on Rheola House itself did not begin until 1812, and was completed in 1814. The result was a 'rustic' villa-style building, which retained something of its cottage origins. Following principles of the picturesque, the house is asymmetric, and sits modestly within its wooded landscape. The building has two main facades, each with a full-height bay to one side, and a veranda along one front. The grounds too were given picturesque features. A stables, laundry and an icehouse were built closer to the lake.

=== Glamorganshire MP ===
In 1818 John Edwards senior died. John Edwards junior was now in sole possession of Rheola. He had married twice and both wives brought considerable inheritances with them which, added to his own inheritance and successful professional activities, meant he was a person of some substance. He had run for parliament to represent Glamorganshire in 1817 and failed to be elected. The local landed gentry, unimpressed by the idea of an outsider and a mere solicitor representing them, ensured a preferred candidate, Sir Christopher Cole, was elected. At the next year's general election, Edwards stood again, and Cole could not afford to run against him. Capitalising on his Neath valley residence and Welsh ancestry, Edwards stood as one who would stand up against the clique of landed gentry. He appealed to lesser gentry, industrialists and professional men, and was, uniquely for a county seat, elected against the interests of the leading landowners, who duly snubbed him. Two years later, when his term of office ended, he did not stand again, and chose rather to focus on the Wells constituency, where he served for two further years from 1830.

=== John and Nash Edwards-Vaughan ===
One of the people who had backed Edwards' Glamorgan campaign was the barrister, William Vaughan of 'Glanelai', (Lanelay), Pontyclun, near Cardiff, after whom Nash Vaughan Edwards (1811-1868) had been named. When Mr Vaughan died in 1829, he left father and son his estate, on condition that they took on the Vaughan surname. Thus they became John Edwards-Vaughan and Nash Vaughan Edwards-Vaughan, and acquired properties at Lanelay and at Clase, Llangyfelach, near Swansea.

When Nash Vaughan died without children, the estate passed to his sister Jessie, who had married John Lee Hanning (although to inherit Dillington House from his uncle, Edward Lee, he became John Lee Lee). Their son Vaughan Hanning Lee, took the additional surname Vaughan in 1874, and the various estates, including Rheola, passed to his eldest son Arthur Vaughan Hanning Vaughan-Lee in 1882.

== Garden and park ==
The park is designated Grade II on the Cadw/ICOMOS Register of Parks and Gardens of Special Historic Interest in Wales. The grounds by 1899 included orchard, woodland with vista paths, parkland, greenhouses, conservatory, carriage drive, kitchen garden, and pheasantry. Rheola Pond lies just north of the house, with an ice house close by, which was probably built at the same time as the main house. Nash Edwards-Vaughan added several other features to the parkland. A chapel (later demolished) had been built, overlooking the lake, and substantial ornamental tree planting in the park from the period still survives.

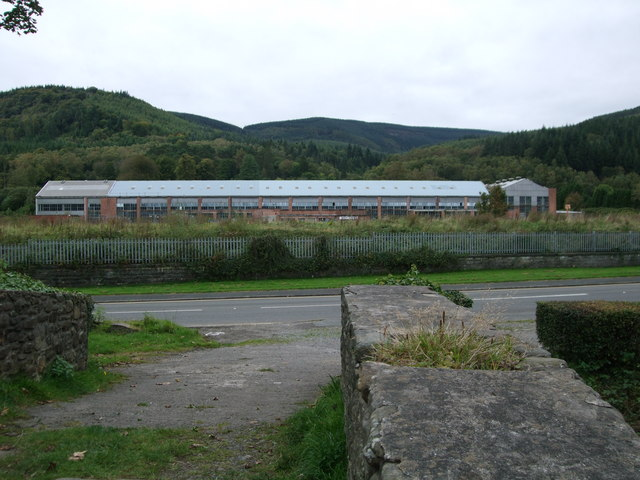
Rheola Works in 2009

== Industrial activity ==
With the rise of industrialisation and coalmining along the Neath valley, it no longer suited its role as a fashionable and picturesque residence. In the 20th century Rheola was the home of Col J. Edwards Vaughan at least until 1926. In 1939 the estate was bought by the British Aluminium Company, who used the house as offices, and built an aluminium smelting plant on a large plot between the house and road. Aluminium smelting requires large amounts of electricity, and the original plan had been to use locally produced electricity, generated with local coal supplies. However World War II broke out before the generators were imported from Switzerland, so the smelting plant attempted to run using national grid electricity, and this was discontinued by 1943. The factory was then in use as a strip mill. The industrial activity had involved an area of hardstanding covering almost 10 hectares (25 acres), which then was used for screening coal from the nearby coalmines. By 1981 it had ceased to be needed for coal screening, and the estate was sold to local construction and demolition company RM Rees. The industrial buildings were used for architectural salvage and a weekly market. The house was in serious decline, as were the grade II listed stables and coach house.

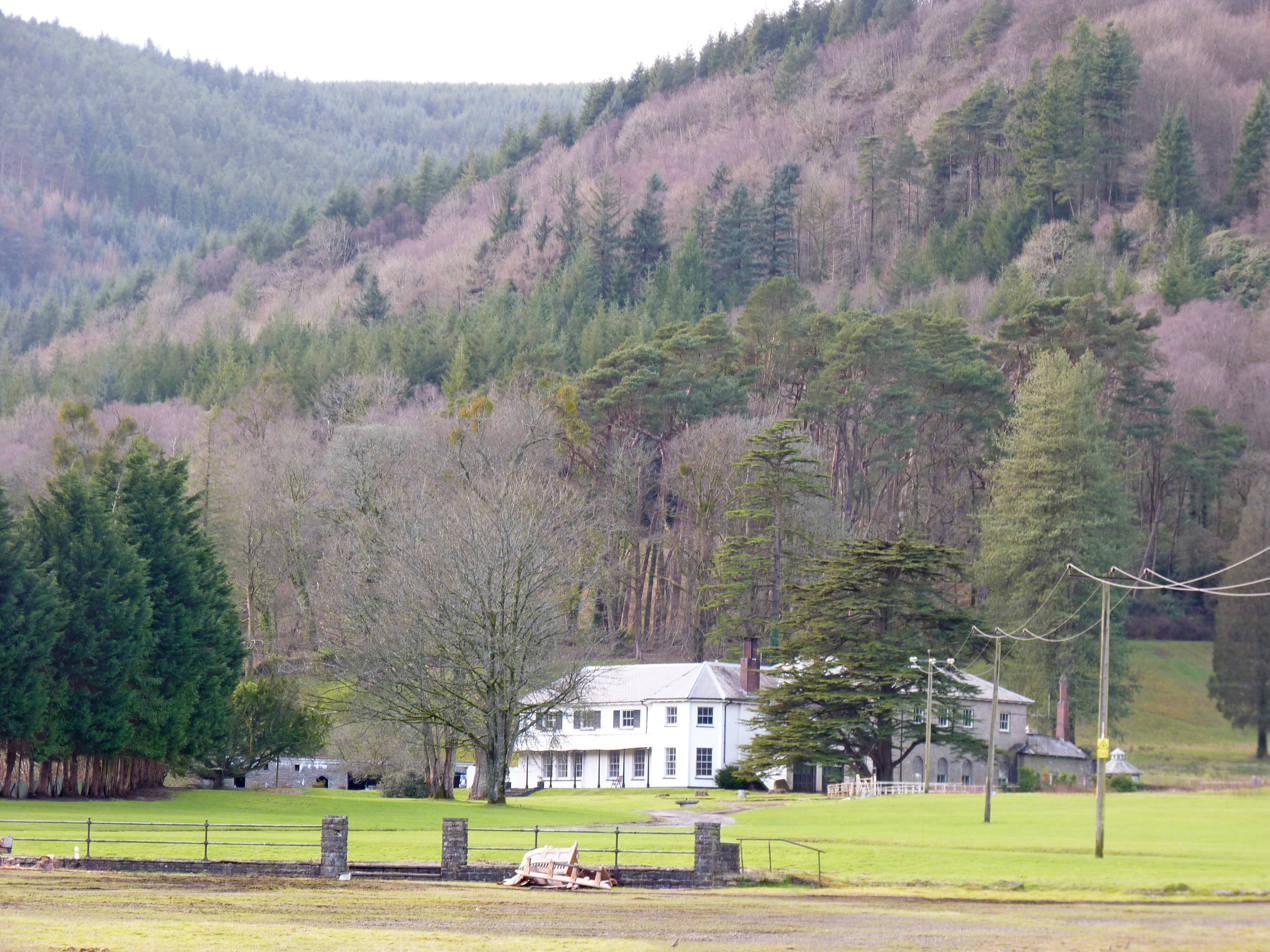
Rheola House in 2016, following removal of the industrial buildings.

== Restoration plans ==
The long-term plan of the Rees family, pursued by their son Howard, has been to build houses on the area of industrial activity, which would provide the capital required to both restore the house and estate buildings, and establish leisure and tourism facilities. These facilities would then aim to provide the longer term income stream needed to provide a sustainable future for the buildings and parkland. Plans were first submitted in 2012, and the Market activities moved elsewhere and site clearance begun. The extensive consultation with numerous interested parties caused, in late 2013, a temporary period in which the firm was placed in administration. However planning permission was granted in late 2014, on the grounds that the building of 46 houses on the 10 ha industrial site, along with 100 log cabins and a leisure complex, constituted an 'enabling development', which would provide the resources for restoration and a sustainable future for the house and estate.

With the previous proposals not eventually going ahead, in 2024 plans were made by development company, Brook Group, to create a 295-bed complex on the site with a boutique hotel and spa in the Rheola House building. A restaurant and farm shop would be created in the outbuildings.

On the evening of 18 August 2026 the house was gutted by fire. On 27 August, five teenagers between 17 and 19 were charged with reckless arson endangering life. All five pleaded guilty. The 17-year-old received a one-year community sentence, while their others were sentenced to three years in a young offenders institution.

== See also ==
- Grade II* listed buildings in Neath Port Talbot
