= John Byset =

Scoto-Norman nobleman

John Byset the Elder
- Lord of the Aird
- Known for: Progenitor of the Bissett family of the Glens of Antrim
- Died: 1257
- Noble family: Bissett
- Issue: John Bissett of Lovat

John Byset the Elder (died 1257), Lord of the Aird, was a Scoto-Norman nobleman who is the progenitor of the Bissett family of the Glens of Antrim in medieval northeastern Ireland, present-day Northern Ireland.

== Biography ==
Born in Scotland, certain details of what is known of his life are limited. John fled to Ireland and then to England with his uncle Walter Byset, Lord of Aboyne, after Walter had been complicit in the murder of Padraig, Earl of Atholl, and two companions at their lodgings after a tournament at Haddington in 1242. They were received into the peace of King Henry III of England. Among these are the date of his death as recorded in the Annals of Ulster. His name has the distinction of being the ancestral element in the Gaelic style Mac Eoin (Bissett) of the Glens used by his descendants in Ireland into the 16th century.

He is known to have had a son, John Bissett of Lovat.

According to some sources it was Byset who founded Beauly Priory in the year 1230.

== See also ==
- Clan Bissett
