= Upsettlington Castle =

Castle in Scottish Borders, Scotland

Coordinates: 55°43′23.88″N 2°9′6.48″W

Upsettington Castle was a castle that was located near Upsettington (now Ladykirk), Scottish Borders, Scotland. The castle was the caput baronium of the Lordship of Upsettlington. The lands and barony were granted to the Bisset family by King William I of Scotland. Upsettlington was strategically located adjacent to the English Norham Castle across the River Tweed. The castle was sacked and destroyed in 1297–1298, while William Bisset, Lord of Upsettlington was in Flanders serving in King Edward I of England's expedition to Flanders.
