= Nicholas Ridley-Colborne, 1st Baron Colborne =

British politician

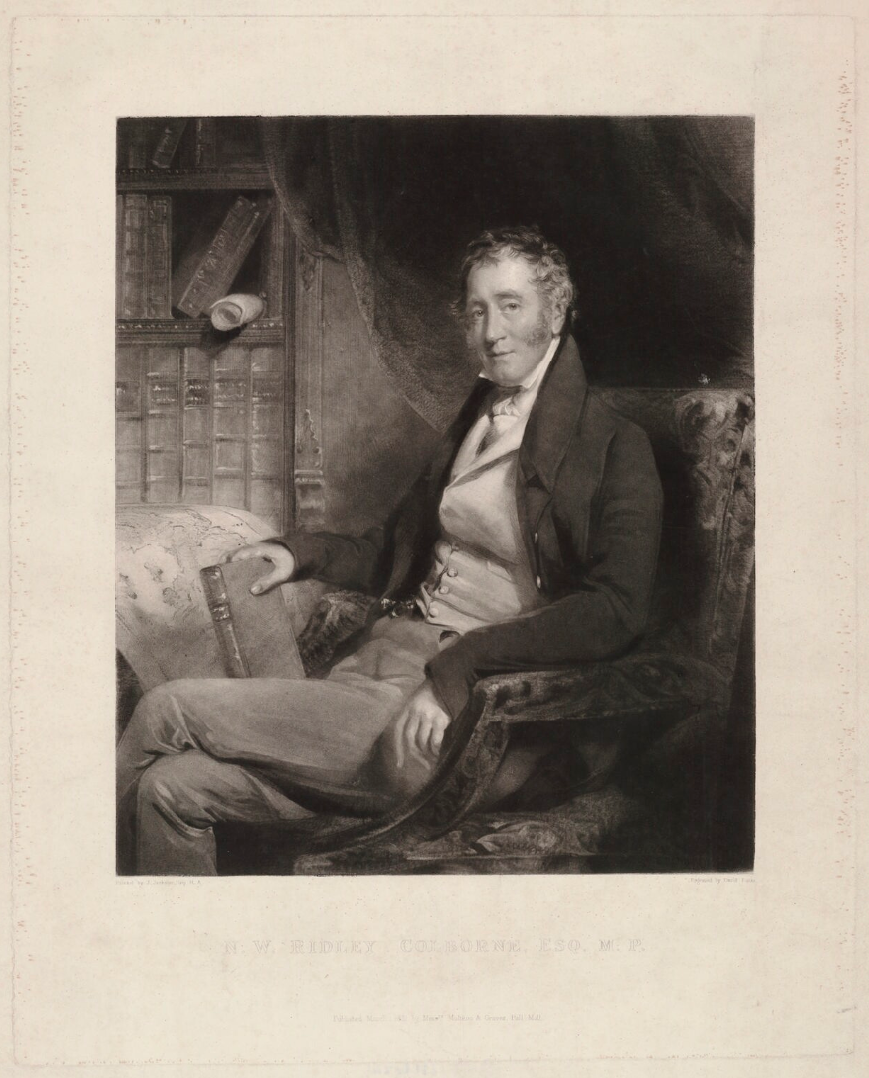
Mezzotint by David Lucas, after John Jackson, 1831.

Nicholas William Ridley-Colborne, 1st Baron Colborne (14 April 1779 – 3 May 1854), was a British politician.

== Background ==
Born Nicholas Ridley, he was the younger son of Sir Matthew White Ridley, 2nd Baronet, and Sarah Colborne (d. 1806), daughter of Benjamin Colborne (see Viscount Ridley for earlier history of the family). In 1803 he assumed by Royal licence the additional surname of Colborne.

== Political career ==
Ridley-Colborne sat as Member of Parliament for Bletchingley from 1805 to 1806, for Malmesbury from 1806 to 1807, for Appleby from 1807 to 1812, for Thetford from 1818 to 1826, for Horsham from 1827 to 1832 and for Wells from 1834 to 1837. In 1839 he was raised to the peerage as Baron Colborne, of West Harling in the County of Norfolk.

== Family ==
Lord Colborne married Charlotte, daughter of Sir Thomas Steele, in 1808. They had five children:

- Maria Charlotte Ridley-Colborne (d. 31 August 1883)
- Henrietta Susannah Ridley-Colborne (1810 – June 1880)
- Emily Frances Ridley-Colborne (1811 – 13 October 1849), married John Moyer Heathcote on 11 April 1833
- William Nicholas Ridley-Colborne (24 July 1814 – 23 March 1846), MP for Richmond 1841–1846
- Louisa Harriet Ridley-Colborne

Lord Colborne died in May 1854, aged 75 and was buried in Kensal Green Cemetery. As he had no surviving sons the barony became extinct. Lady Colborne died in February 1855.

Parliament of the United Kingdom
Preceded by James Milnes; John Benn-Walsh	Member of Parliament for Bletchingley; 1805–1806; With: John Benn-Walsh	Succeeded by Josias Porcher; William Kenrick
Preceded by Claude Scott; Samuel Scott	Member of Parliament for Malmesbury; 1806–1807; With: Robert Ladbroke	Succeeded by Sir George Bowyer, Bt; Philip Gell
Preceded by Viscount Howick; James Ramsay Cuthbert	Member of Parliament for Appleby; 1807–1812; With: James Ramsay Cuthbert	Succeeded by John Courtenay; James Lowther
Preceded by Thomas Creevey; Lord John FitzRoy	Member of Parliament for Thetford; 1818–1826; With: Lord Charles FitzRoy	Succeeded by Lord Charles FitzRoy; Bingham Baring
Preceded by Robert Hurst; Hon. Henry Fox	Member of Parliament for Horsham; 1827–1832; With: Robert Hurst 1827–1829; The Earl of Surrey 1829–1832	Succeeded by Robert Henry Hurst (representation reduced to one member 1832)
Preceded by John Lee Lee; Norman Lamont	Member of Parliament for Wells; 1834–1837; With: John Lee Lee	Succeeded by Richard Blakemore; Sir William Goodenough Hayter, Bt
Peerage of the United Kingdom
New creation	Baron Colborne; 1839–1854	Extinct
