= Vaughan Vaughan-Lee =

English politician (1836–1882)

The Right Honourable Vaughan Vaughan-Lee JP DL

Member of Parliament for West Somerset
- In office 1874–1882 Serving with Hon. Arthur Hood, Mordaunt Bisset
- Preceded by: William Gore-Langton; Hon. Arthur Hood
- Succeeded by: Mordaunt Bisset; Edward Stanley

Personal details
- Born: Vaughan Hanning Lee; 25 February 1836
- Died: 7 July 1882 (aged 46)
- Party: Conservative
- Spouse: Clara Elizabeth Moore (m. 1861; died 1882)
- Relations: John Edwards-Vaughan (grandfather)
- Children: 8
- Parent(s): John Lee Lee; Jessy Edwards-Vaughan
- Education: Eton College

Vaughan Hanning Vaughan-Lee JP DL (25 February 1836 – 7 July 1882) was an English Conservative Party politician who sat in the House of Commons from 1874 to 1882.

== Early life ==
Vaughan-Lee was born Lee, was the only son of John Lee Lee of Dillington House, Ilminster, and his first wife Jessy Edwards-Vaughan, daughter of John Edwards-Vaughan of Rheola. His father and maternal grandfather were MPs for Wells at the same time. After his mother's death in 1836, his father married Hon. Mary Sophia Hood (the eldest daughter of Samuel Hood, 2nd Baron Bridport and Charlotte Hood, 3rd Duchess of Bronte) in 1841. From his father's second marriage, he had four younger half siblings.

Vaughan-Lee was educated at Eton College and joined the Royal Scots Fusiliers (21st) in 1854.

== Career ==
He took part in the Crimean War in 1854 to 1855 including the Battle of Alma, the Battle of Inkerman, the Siege of Sevastopol and the attack on the redan and Kinbourn. He was promoted to lieutenant in December 1854 and was wounded twice. In 1858, he became a captain and in 1859 retired from the army. He was a major in the Glamorganshire Light Infantry Militia, and a captain in the West Somerset Yeomanry Cavalry.

He was a Justice of the Peace and Deputy Lieutenant for Glamorgan and Somerset and was High Sheriff of Glamorgan in 1871. In 1874 he assumed the additional surname Vaughan.

At the 1874 general election Vaughan-Lee was elected Member of Parliament (MP) for West Somerset. He held the seat until he resigned shortly before his death in 1882.

== Personal life ==
On 7 August 1861, Vaughan-Lee was married to Clara Elizabeth Moore (1841–1911) in Appleby Magna. She was a daughter of George Moore of Appleby Hall, Leicestershire. Together, they were the parents of four sons and four daughters, including:

- Col. Arthur Vaughan Hanning Vaughan-Lee (1862–1933), who married Ursula Pickering, daughter of Henry Dawnay Umfreville Pickering, in 1915.
- John Edwards Vaughan-Lee of Rheola (1863–1929), who married Alice Elizabeth Ashe, daughter of Maj. Waller Ashe, in 1888.
- Jessy Isabel Vaughan-Lee (1866–1940), who married Walter Boden in 1888.
- Adm. Sir Charles Lionel Vaughan-Lee (1867–1928), who married Rose Cecilia Llewellyn, a daughter of Llewellyn Llewellyn of Nethway House, South Devon (and sister to Evan Henry Llewellyn).
- Alec George Vaughan-Lee (1868–1960), a civil engineer.
- Katherine Mary Vaughan-Lee (1871–1962), who married Albert Philip Payne-Gallwey, son of Capt. Philip Payne-Gallwey (a son of Sir William Payne-Gallwey, 1st Baronet) and Frances Warburton (a daughter of The Ven. Charles Warburton), in 1900.
- Caroline Christine Lee (1873–1950), who married Richard Henry Ratcliff in 1894. After his death, she married first-class cricketer and British Army officer Horace Ogilvie Peacock in 1908.
- Alice Clara Lee (1877–1937), who married Admiral and Naval Secretary George Knightley Chetwode, son of Sir George Chetwode, 6th Baronet, in 1908.

Vaughan-Lee died on 7 July 1882 at the age of 46.

Parliament of the United Kingdom
| Preceded by William Gore-Langton; Hon. Arthur Hood | Member of Parliament for West Somerset; 1874 – 1882; With: Hon. Arthur Hood to 1880; Mordaunt Bisset from 1880 | Succeeded by Mordaunt Bisset; Edward Stanley |
