= Samuel John Carter =

British artist (1835–1892)

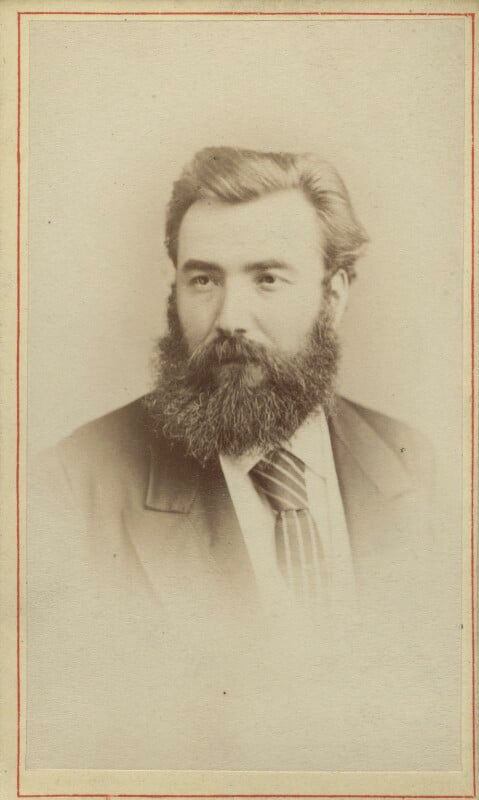
Samuel John Carter

Samuel John Carter (March 1835 – 1 May 1892) was a British artist and illustrator, known for his paintings and drawings of animals. He was the father of the archaeologist Howard Carter.

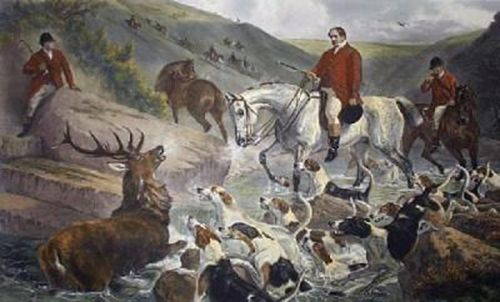
Mordaunt Fenwick-Bisset (1825–1884), by Samuel John Carter

== Life ==
Carter was born in March 1835 at Swaffham, Norfolk, the son of Samuel Isaac Carter, a gamekeeper. As a child Carter took lessons from John Sell Cotman who ran a school of drawing in Swaffham.

Basing himself in London and Swaffham, Carter established himself as an animal painter, including wildlife and hunting scenes, and was the principal animal illustrator for the Illustrated London News from 1867 to 1889. He also worked as an animal portrait painter in his Norfolk locale, including obtaining commissions to paint clients' horses and dogs. Exhibiting regularly at the Royal Academy, he drew positive comment from John Ruskin.

In 1858, at the age of 22, Carter married Martha Joyce (c. 1836–1920) at Swaffham. They had 11 children: ten sons and a daughter, with three sons dying in infancy. Most of the surviving children inherited their father's artistic talent with three, William, Verney and Amy, exhibiting at the Royal Academy. The youngest, Howard, became an archaeologist after gaining a reputation for his precise copying of Egyptian tomb decorations, he later discovering the tomb of Tutankhamun.

Having suffering at least one stroke, Carter died on 1 May 1892 aged 57.

== Work ==
Howard Carter later said of his father "being an animal painter of no little fame ... he was one of the most powerful draughtmen I ever knew. His knowledge of comparative anatomy and memory of form was matchless. He could depict from memory, accurately, any animal in any action, foreshortened or otherwise, with the greatest ease".

Record price for a painting by Samuel Carter at auction is $9,465 USD for ''The King of the Castle'', sold at Sotheby's Olympia in 2005.
