= Norman Lamont (MP for Wells) =

Norman Lamont (1780 – 27 April 1834) was a Scottish politician and Army officer.

Born at Monidrain, in Argyllshire, Norman was the second son of Lord John Lamont. He became a Major in the 91st (Argyllshire Highlanders) Regiment of Foot, serving in the Battle of Waterloo. At the 1832 UK general election, he stood for the Whigs in Wells, winning the seat. In Parliament, he argued for the immediate abolition of slavery. He resigned in April 1834, by taking the Chiltern Hundreds, and died later in the month.

Parliament of the United Kingdom
Preceded by John Edwards-Vaughan; John Lee Lee	Member of Parliament for Wells; 1832 – 1834; With: John Lee Lee	Succeeded by Nicholas Ridley-Colborne; John Lee Lee
