= West Knighton =

West Knighton may refer to:

- West Knighton, Dorset, a village in England
- West Knighton, Leicestershire, a suburb of Leicester, England
