= Anthony Traill (priest) =

Irish Anglican priest (1755–1831)

Anthony Traill (November 25, 1755 – November 16, 1831) was an Irish Anglican priest in the 18th century.

Traill was educated at Trinity College, Dublin. He was Archdeacon of Connor from 1831 until his death.

Church of Ireland titles
Preceded by Alexander Bissett	Archdeacon of Connor; 1782–1831	Succeeded by Walter Bishop Mant
