= Walter Byset, Lord of Aboyne =

Scoto-Norman nobleman

Walter Byset (died 1251), Lord of Aboyne, was a Scoto-Norman nobleman.

== Biography ==
Born in Scotland, Walter married in 1233 Ada of Galloway, daughter of Lochlann of Galloway and wife Elena de Moreville. She was the sister of Alan of Galloway.

Walter fled to Ireland and then to England with his nephew John Byset after they had been accused of involvement in the murder of Padraig, Earl of Atholl (his cousin in-law), and two companions at their lodgings after a tournament at Haddington in 1242. Patrick II Earl of March, exhorted by David de Hastings, pursued Walter who sought protection from King Alexander II of Scotland. Despite the king securing him in a number of safe houses he was eventually banished, with the loss of his estates, to England. Walter was received into the peace of King Henry III of England.

In 1248, Walter seized Dunaverty Castle and was granted by King Henry III of England to buy stores from Ireland to provision and fortify the castle. Walter was captured by Allan, the son of the Earl of Atholl, also in 1248 after Dunaverty Castle fell.

Walter is recorded as having died in 1251 on the Isle of Arran.

== See also ==
- Clan Bissett
- Maryculter House

== Citations and references ==
Citations

References

- Campbell, Thorbjorn (2013). Arran: A History, Birlinn, ISBN 9780857905901.
- Dalrymple, David (1776). Annales of Scotland: From the accession of Malcolm III. surnamed Canmore, to the accession of Robert I. Vol. 1. Balfour & Smellie.
- Oram, RD (1988). The Lordship of Galloway, c. 1000 to c. 1250 (PhD thesis). University of St Andrews. hdl:10023/2638.
- Oram, RD (2004a). "Alan, Lord of Galloway (b. before 1199, d. 1234)". Oxford Dictionary of National Biography (online ed.). Oxford University Press. doi:10.1093/ref:odnb/49362. (Subscription, Wikipedia Library access or UK public library membership required.)
- Way, George and Squire, Romily. (1994). Collins Scottish Clan & Family Encyclopedia. (Foreword by The Rt Hon. The Earl of Elgin KT, Convenor, The Standing Council of Scottish Chiefs).
