= Alexander Bissett =

Irish Anglican priest

Alexander Bissett was an Irish Anglican priest in the 18th century.

Bissett was born at Newport, Isle of Wight. He was the incumbent at Kilmore;Prebendary of Ballymore in Armagh Cathedral from 1757 to 1759; and Archdeacon of Connor from 1759 until his death.

His son was Bishop of Raphoe from 1822 to 1834.

Church of Ireland titles
| Preceded by Samuel Hutchinson | Archdeacon of Connor; 1759–1782 | Succeeded by Anthony Traill |
