= Luscombe =

Luscombe may refer to:

== Surname ==
Notable people with the surname Luscombe include:

- Belinda Luscombe, Australian-born journalist
- Donald A. Luscombe (1895–1965), American businessman and entrepreneur
- Francis Luscombe (1849–1926), English rugby union international
- Hal Luscombe (born 1981), Wales international rugby union player
- John Luscombe (1848–1937), English rugby union international
- Lee Luscombe (born 1971), English professional soccer player
- Matthew Luscombe (1776–1846), English missionary bishop of the Anglican Communion
- Michael Luscombe (1953–2018), Australian businessman - former CEO and Managing Director of Woolworths Limited
- Nathan Luscombe (born 1989), English footballer
- Nick Luscombe (born 1966), British radio DJ
- Stephen Luscombe (1954–2025), English musician
- Ted Luscombe (1924–2022), Anglican bishop and author, Primus of the Scottish Episcopal Church
- Tim Luscombe (born 1960), British playwright, director, actor and teacher

== Places ==
- Luscombe Castle, near Dawlish, Devon, England
- Luscombe, Rattery, an historic estate in Devon

== See also ==
- Luscombe Searelle (1853–1907), English musical composer and impresario
- Luscombe Aircraft, defunct American aircraft manufacturer
- Luscombe Airfield, airfield at Nui Dat, Phuoc Tuy Province, South Vietnam (now in Ba Ria-Vung Tau Province, Vietnam)
