= Knighton Downs and Wood =

Protected area in Wiltshire, England

Coordinates: 51.01266°N 1.93295°W

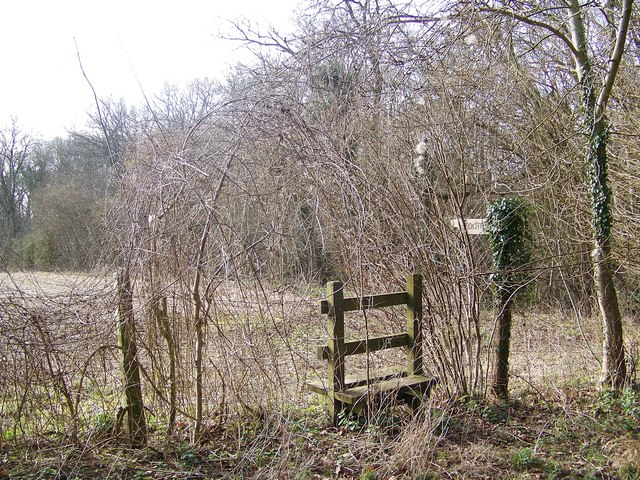
Footpath and stile, Knighton Wood

Knighton Downs and Wood (grid reference SU048237) is a 203.7 hectare biological Site of Special Scientific Interest in Wiltshire, notified in 1971.

== Sources ==
- Natural England citation sheet for the site (accessed 7 April 2022)
