= Knighton Gorges Manor =

Manor house on the Isle of Wight, England

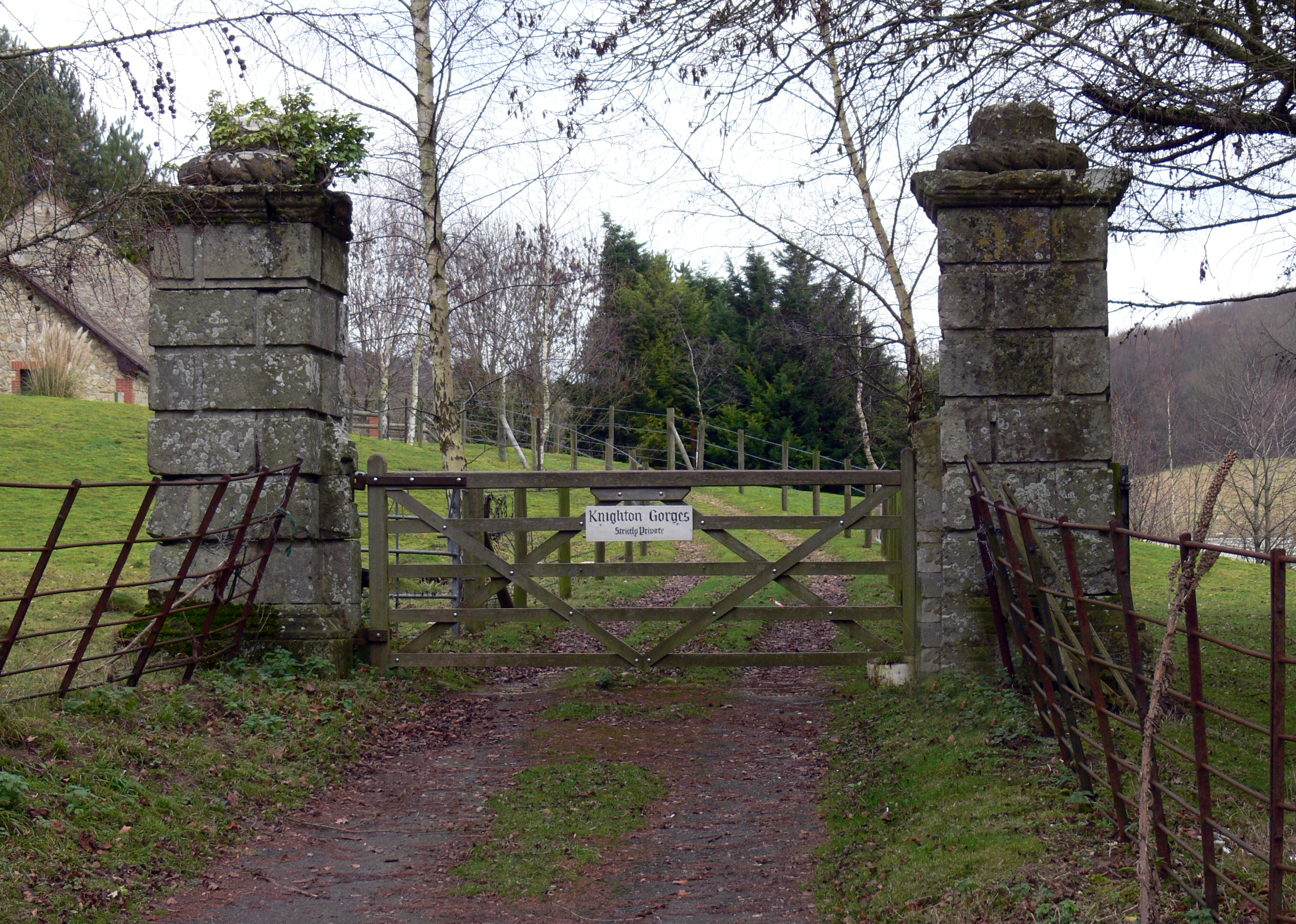
- Entry gate posts of the demolished Knighton Gorges Manor

- Location within Isle of Wight

General information
- Architectural style: Tudor architecture
- Location: Near Newchurch, Knighton, Isle of Wight, England
- Coordinates: 50°39′52″N 1°12′30″W
- Construction started: 12th Century
- Demolished: 1821

Technical details
- Structural system: Brick

"Knighton the seat of George M Bisset Esq." Engraving by Richard Godfrey, published in Worsley, Sir Richard, History of the Isle of Wight, London, 1781, opp. p. 206

Knighton Gorges Manor was one of the grandest manor houses on the Isle of Wight, located in the hamlet of Knighton, near Newchurch.

The Elizabethan-Tudor style house's history has been a saga of tragic events. It started with a ghastly note of Hugh de Morville, an escapee who resided there after murdering Archbishop Thomas Becket of Canterbury, on 29 December 1170, along with his three other comrades in crime Reginald FitzUrse, William de Tracy and Richard le Breton, then the death of Tristram Dillington in 1718, under mysterious circumstances and finally, 100 years later, followed by another tragic event of the owner of the Manor, George Maurice, destroying the manor in 1821 on his own volition (before his death), purely as a parental annoyance and spiteful action, to his daughter marrying a clergyman, against his wishes thus preventing her from owning the manor.

== History ==
Sir Hugh de Morville (d.1202) fled to the house after taking part as one of four knights in the murder on 29 December 1170 of Thomas Becket, Archbishop of Canterbury. He fled thence to Knaresborough Castle, Yorkshire, which was held by him. The manor was owned by the de Morvilles until 1256 when Ralf de Gorges acquired it by marriage, which is where the name Knighton Gorges comes from. The early 13th-century holders were a family of De Morville, of whom John or Ivo de Morville died in 1256, leaving a daughter and heir Ellen married to Ralph de Gorges, who survived her husband and was in possession of the manor at the end of the century.

She died in 1291–2, leaving a son Ralph, who in 1305 leased the manor to William de Caleshale and his wife for the term of their lives. The manor seems to have reverted to Ralph de Gorges before 1316. Ralph (afterwards Sir Ralph) and his wife Eleanor had one son Ralph, who died without issue, evidently before 1330–1, when Sir Ralph settled the manor in tail-male on two younger sons of his daughter Eleanor, who had married Theobald Russell of Yaverland.

William, the elder of the two, died without issue and the manor was delivered to his brother Theobald Russell in 1343. He appears thereupon to have assumed the name de Gorges, and as Theobald de Gorges was sued in 1346–7 by Elizabeth widow of Ralph de Gorges the younger for the manor. Judgement was given in Elizabeth's favour, but as she had no issue by Ralph the manor reverted to Theobald, who was in possession in 1362. He (then Sir Theobald) died in 1380 and the manor passed successively to his sons Sir Randolf, who died in 1382, Bartholomew, who died in 1395–6, and Thomas, who died in 1404.

Thomas left a son John, who only lived to be fifteen, and left his brother Theobald, a boy of ten, as heir in 1413. Sir Theobald Gorges was in possession of the manor in 1462, and probably died without issue, as the manor passed to the heirs of Thomas Russell, greatgrandson of Theobald Russell and Eleanor de Gorges by their eldest son Ralph Russell of Yaverland. Thomas Russell's heir was his cousin John Haket, son of his aunt Alice. John Haket's daughter and heir Joan married John Gilbert, and the manor passed with Wolverton in Brading in the Gilbert family until 1563, when George Gilbert sold it to Anthony Dillington. Anthony's son Sir Robert died in 1604, leaving it to his nephew Robert. Sir Tristram Dillington, great-grandson of the last-named Robert, was the last of the direct line.

Dying without issue in 1721, Tristram left his sisters Mary and Hannah as heirs. Hannah died intestate. Mary died unmarried, leaving the estate in common between her nephew Maurice Bocland and her niece Jane wife of John Eyre. General Maurice Bocland was in possession of the manor in 1750 and died in 1765, when it descended to his nephew Maurice George Bisset, who held the manor at the beginning of the 19th century. In 1820, the house was burnt and demolished, and has not been rebuilt.

A commonly-told story is that Bisset himself demolished his house out of spite because his daughter was marrying a clergyman, against his wishes, and he therefore prevented her from ever owning the manor. However, in his will, dated 1818, he provides generously for his two daughters and makes no mention of any intention to disinherit either.

George Young was in possession of the remaining estate in 1878, and the land as of 1912 was held by Mr. Edward Carter, who acquired it under the will of his father, also named Edward.

The site of the house is now private, and a holiday cottage exists upon the estate in one of the remaining outbuildings.

== Architecture ==
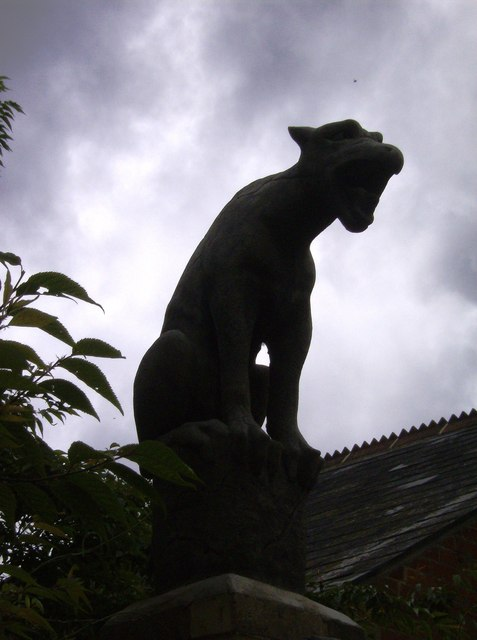
A 2 ft high beast (looks like a panther) or gargoyle made in stone, on a gatepost some yards in front of the roof of Knighton

The house was a remarkably good example of Tudor work. All that is now left of the house is the two stone gateposts as the house was burnt down and demolished in 1820 by Maurice George Bisset to prevent his daughter inheriting it after she had married a clergyman without Bisset's consent.

The north front had large square windows, with an absence of stained glass, divided by stone mullions. The rooms were of large size and elegantly designed. The drawing room on the first floor was a capacious room with a long gallery in the north front. Lighting in the house was poor as it had a low roof. Elsewhere a coat of arms pre-dating the house decorated the windows.

In its heyday the manor house was visited by Sir Henry Englefield who gave detailed description of the manor in his "Description of the Isle of Wight". It was a favoured haunt of fashionable society including Sir Richard Worsley, 7th Baronet of nearby Appuldurcombe House, the latter's association resulting in a scandal and disgrace.
