= Knighton, Isle of Wight =

Hamlet on the Isle of Wight, England

Coordinates: 50.6780°N 1.1998°W

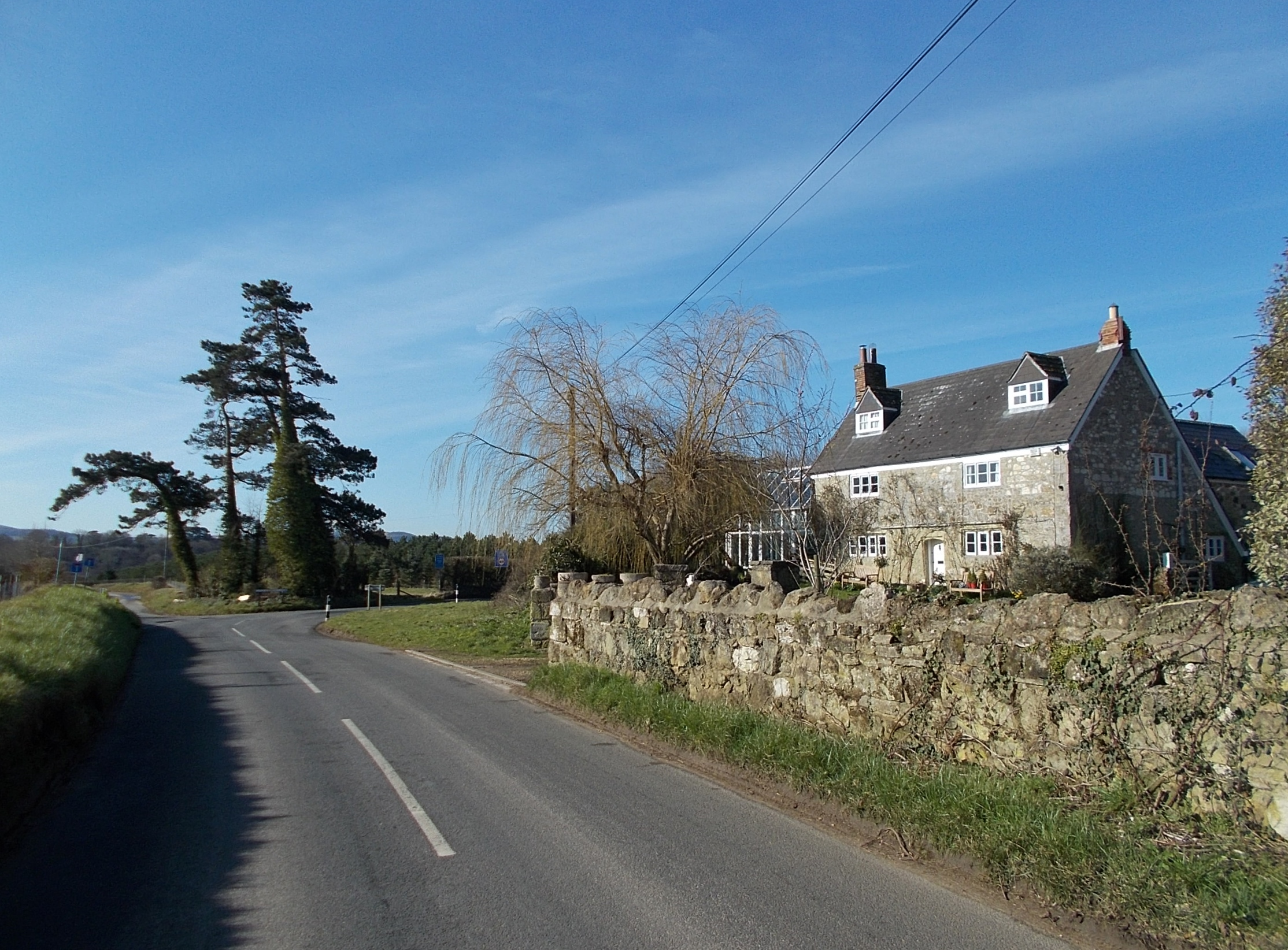
Griggs Farm, Knighton

Knighton is a largely deserted hamlet near Newchurch on the Isle of Wight, about 2 miles NW of Sandown. The name should be pronounced as Kay-nighton to avoid confusion with the larger village of Niton, near Ventnor.

Knighton is situated under Knighton Down and has historically always been a part of the civil parish of nearby Newchurch. Knighton consists of little more than a collection of farmhouses, most now turned to residential use. The only amenity in the settlement is a post-box. To the south is Knighton Sandpit Ltd which is an aggregate extraction company. The pit is also used for off-road driving events. This is however, a little way from the main residential area.

== Name ==
The name means 'the farmstead or estate of the young thanes or retainers', from Old English cniht (genitive plural cnihta) and tūn. There are other places called Knighton with similar origins.

1086 (Domesday Book): Chenistone

1193-1217: Cnihtaton

1255: Knyttetone

1316: Knyghteton

1327: Knightone

== Knighton Gorges Manor ==
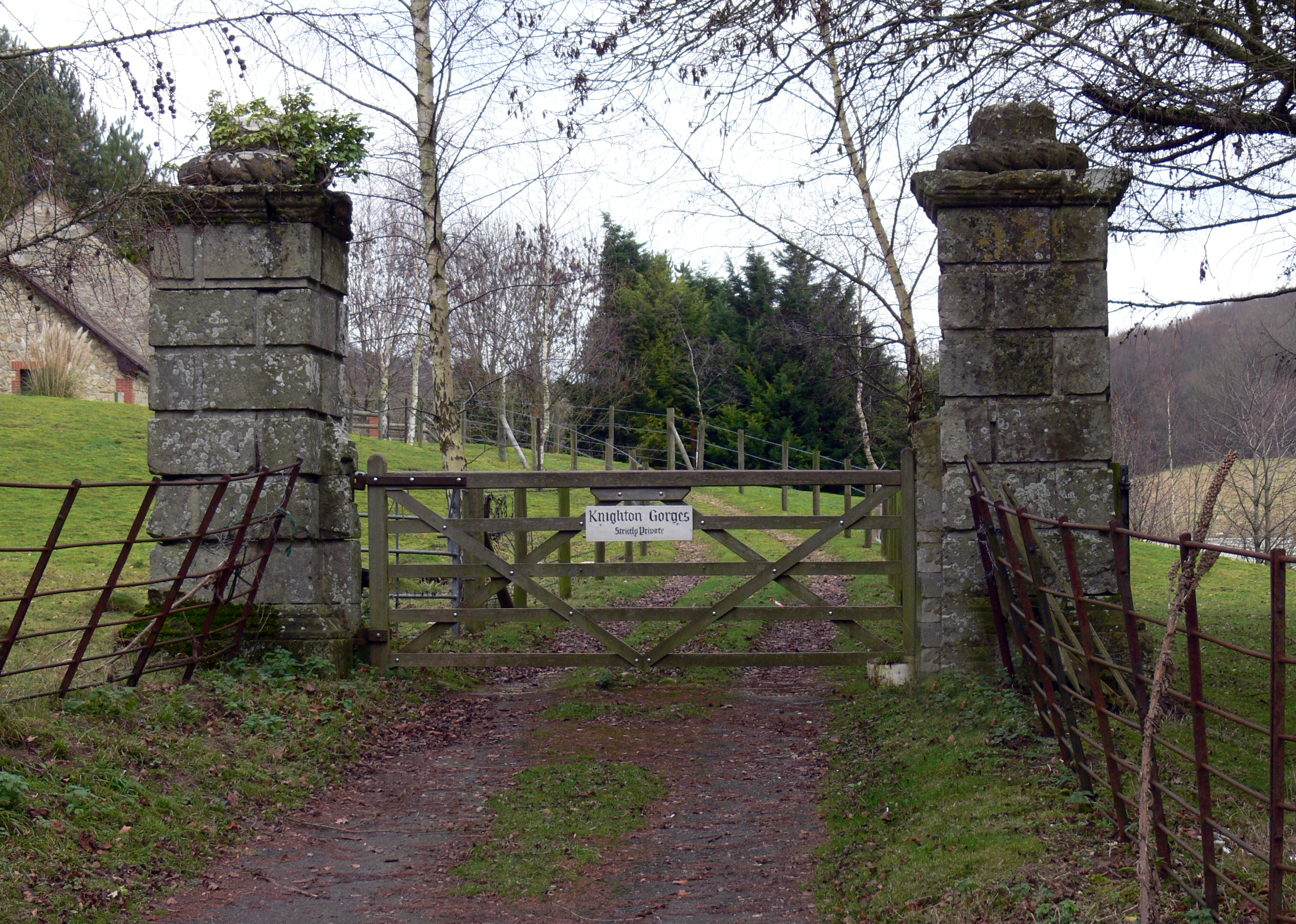
Gateposts of Knighton Gorges Manor

Knighton Gorges Manor in Knighton was one of the grandest manor houses on the Isle of Wight. But when the owner's daughter married against his will, he had it demolished, rather than allowing her to inherit it.

Hugh De Morville, one of the knights responsible for the murder of Thomas Becket, fled to Knighton Gorges.

== History ==
There was a medieval settlement in Knighton, but nearly all of the population moved to the nearby village of Newchurch to escape the Black Death. Flint arrow heads can still be found in fields surrounding the area. It was estimated that at one time, the hamlet contained up to 60 houses.

Jimmy Tarbuck lived at Griggs Farm in the 1980s whilst performing in the nearby town of Sandown.

Knighton is the home of the Wight Crystal drinking water company, whose water comes from Knighton.

John Wavell and Anna Cowlam farmed Knighton farm after their marriage in 1735 in Newchurch. They were the great-great-grandparents of Archibald Wavell, 1st Earl Wavell (1883-1950), former Field marshal and Viceroy of India.

== Ghost stories ==
The area and house are said to be haunted by various ghosts and are a popular stop for ghost tourists. One story often told is that of Sir Tristram Dillington, M.P. for Newport, who is thought to have committed suicide after taking to gambling heavily after the death of his wife. His valet is said to have concealed the nature of his death by placing his corpse upon his horse, Thunderbolt, and driving it into the lake, ensuring that the property was not forfeited. The story is that the ghost of Sir Tristram rides a ghostly horse each year on the anniversary of his death, which occurred on 7 July 1721. The most famous haunting is said to take place on New Year's Eve when, it is claimed, the old house "re-appears", many people often gather at the spot on 31 December to try to witness the apparition.
