= William Bissett (bishop) =

Church of Ireland bishop

William Bissett (1758–1834) was an Anglican bishop in the Church of Ireland. He was the last Bishop of Raphoe, although he declined to be the Archbishop of Dublin. He had previously been Archdeacon of Ross.

== Life ==
Bissett was born on 27 October 1758. His father was the Revd Alexander Bissett, the Chancellor of Armagh Cathedral, who died in 1782. He was educated at Christ Church, Oxford. In 1784 he became the rector of Dunbin in the county of Louth, which he resigned upon his collation, on 31 January 1791, to the prebend of Loughgall, or Leval-English in the cathedral church of Armagh. In 1791, he became rector of Clonmore, and in 1804 was collated, 29 September, to the archdeaconry of Ross, in what had been, since 1583, the united episcopate of Cork, Cloyne, and Ross. In 1807, he resigned his prebendal stall of Loughgall to become rector of Donoghmore and was appointed in 1812 as the rectory of Loughgilly.

All his preferments, except the archdeaconry of Ross, were within the Diocese of Armagh. In 1817 he was appointed to the chancellorship of Armagh, to which he was collated on 23 August, thus succeeding his father after twenty-five years. As his final preferment, Bisset was appointed by the Marquis of Wellesley, Lord-Lieutenant of Ireland, 1821–1828, to the bishopric of Raphoe. His patent was dated 5 June 1822. He administered the affairs of the diocese with general approval. On the death of Archbishop Magee as Archbishop of Dublin on 19 August 1831, Bisset was pressed to become his successor, but he declined on the ground of increasing infirmities.

He built several churches in the diocese and expended a considerable sum of money on the improvement of the palace at Raphoe; and when the parliamentary grant was withdrawn from the Association for the Discountenancing of Vice, he supplied the loss.

Bissett died at Lessendrum, Aberdeenshire on 5 September 1834.

== Works ==
He was the author of a study of Edmund Burke.

== Notes ==
Religious titles
Preceded by William Magee	Bishop of Raphoe; 1822 –1834	See merged to Derry and Raphoe
