= William Knighton =

Sir William Knighton Bt GCH
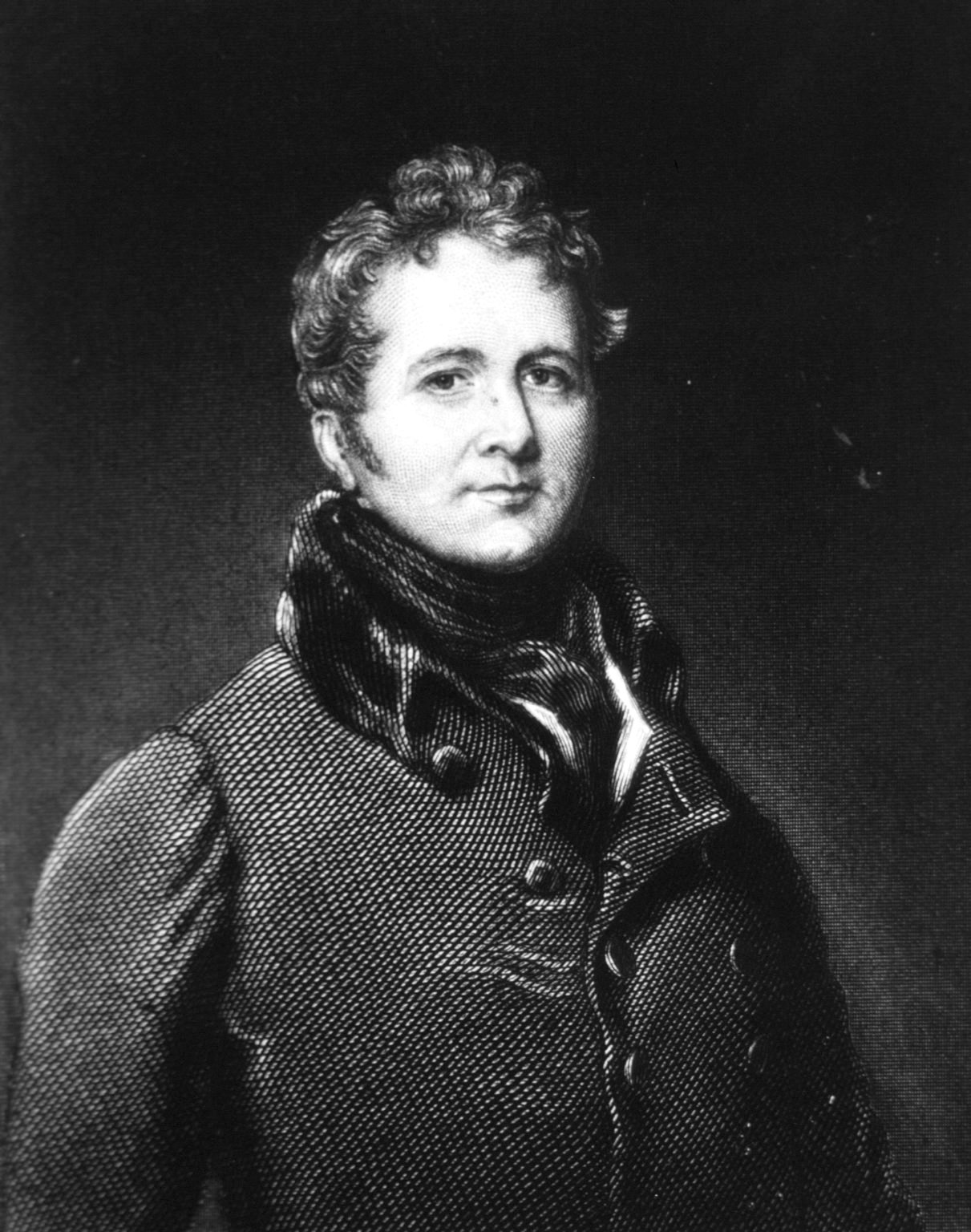

Private Secretary to the Sovereign
- In office 1822–1830
- Monarch: George IV
- Preceded by: Lt. Gen. Sir Benjamin Bloomfield
- Succeeded by: Lt. Gen. Sir Herbert Taylor

Personal details
- Born: January 1776-1777 Bere Ferrers, England, UK
- Died: 11 October 1836 London, England, UK
- Resting place: Kensal Green Cemetery
- Spouse: Dorothea Knighton
- Education: University of St Andrews and University of Edinburgh

Sir William Knighton, 1st Baronet, GCH (1776/7 – 11 October 1836) was a society and royal physician who later became Private Secretary to the Sovereign under George IV (1822–1830).

== Life ==
=== Early life ===
Knighton was born in 1776 (1777) at Bere Ferrers, Devon - the third generation of that name - into a family of well-to-do and literate yeomen-farmers. By a second advantageous marriage, his grandfather joined the ranks of the landed gentry and raised a second family so designated, while his first, elder son remained a 'farmer'. This distinction, in that era's highly stratified society, sparked Knighton's self admitted will-to-succeed – the more so since he apparently retained a distorted version of early events.

At around twelve Knighton was sent to a boarding school at Newton Bushell in East Devon, where he spent some four years acquiring literacy, arithmetic, Greek and Latin. In September, 1793, he was apprenticed to Dr. William Bredall of Tavistock, a surgeon-apothocary with a wide and diverse practice who was also the husband of Knighton's aunt, Mary. Bredall's training and example deeply influenced Knighton's subsequent career. During this period he also made two important professional contacts: contemporary Stephen Hammick, who was training at the Royal Naval Hospital at Plymouth, and Dr Francis Geach, its senior surgeon. Geach started him writing up case notes, which were the only means by which an experienced physician could evaluate a student, and was a vital tool to communicating with contemporaries.

War broke out between France and England in 1793; in 1795 his step-aunt Frances' husband arranged a commission for Knighton as a second lieutenant in the Tavistock Volunteer Corps. While probably expensive, this commission conferred several benefits: it exempted him from militia service (possibly under his 'gentleman' step-uncle John Moore Knighton); it prevented deployment overseas while allowing him to continue his apprenticeship, and it conferred status as an officer and gentleman.

=== Career ===
He spent two years at Guy's Hospital, London, and received a diploma from the University of St Andrews in 1797. In that year he was assistant surgeon at the Royal Naval Hospital Plymouth, and then commenced private practice, initially in Devonport, in London from 1803, then briefly Edinburgh, and in London again from 1806. In 1809 he was medical officer to the embassy to Spain of Henry Wellesley.

He was physician to the Prince of Wales in 1810. He was also auditor of the Duchy of Lancaster, and from 1821 to 1830 was private secretary to the king and formally Keeper of the Privy Purse. In an almost unprecedented move, the king surrendered control of his financial affairs to Knighton in 1822, on account of his enormous debts, in which year Knighton retired from private practice. After three years, in 1825, Knighton declared that the king was free of debt. He had an unparalleled influence over the king, and letters from him to Knighton were addressed "M[y] D[ear] F[riend]," unlike the normal third person that was associated with the sovereign.

In addition, Knighton studied at the University of Edinburgh for three years. He received MDs from the University of Aberdeen in 1806, from the Archbishop of Canterbury, and from the University of Göttingen in 1821.

He was created a baronet on 1 January 1813.

He died on 11 October 1836 at Stratford Place in London, and is buried in Kensal Green Cemetery.

== Family ==
In 1800 he married Dorothea Hawker.

Baronetage of the United Kingdom
New creation	Baronet (of Carlston, Dorset); 1813–1836	Succeeded by William Wellesley Knighton
Court offices
Preceded by Lieutenant-General Benjamin Bloomfield, GCB	Private Secretary to the Sovereign; 1822–1830	Succeeded by Lieutenant-General Sir Herbert Taylor, GCB GCH
Preceded by Lieutenant-General Benjamin Bloomfield, GCB	Keeper of the Privy Purse; 1822–1830	Succeeded by Sir Henry Wheatley, 1st Baronet
