= Archdeacon of Raphoe =

Senior ecclesiastical officer within Church of Ireland

Province of Armagh
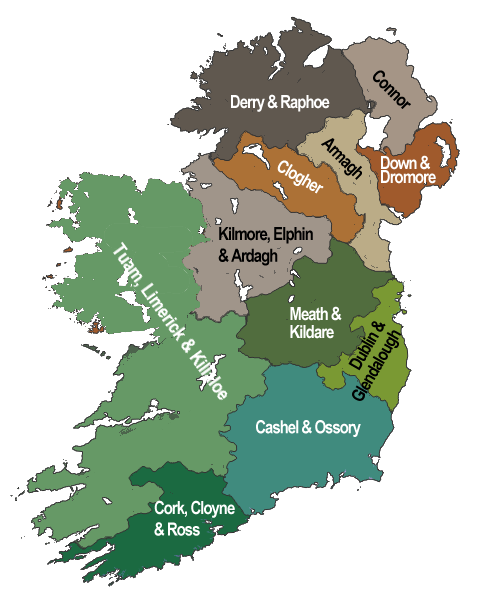
- Church: Church of Ireland
- Metropolitan bishop: Archbishop of Armagh
- Cathedral: St Patrick's Cathedral, Armagh
- Dioceses: 7

The Archdeacon of Raphoe is a senior ecclesiastical officer within the Anglican Diocese of Derry and Raphoe. As such they are responsible for the disciplinary supervision of the clergy within the Raphoe part of the diocese, which is by far the largest.

The archdeaconry can trace its history back to Thomas O'Nahan, who held the office from 1299 to 1306, to the current incumbent David Huss who assumed office in 2013.

== Archdeacons of Raphoe ==
Archdeacons of Raphoe
From	Until	Incumbent	Notes
1299	1306	Thomas O'Nahan (Irish: Tomás Ó Naán)	First recorded Archdeacon
1442		Laurence	Recorded during 1442.
1619	1638	Thomas Bruce	(1636-1689
1675	1689	James Hamilton	Also Vicar General of Raphoe
1690	1754	Andrew Hamilton	Archdeacon for 64 years
1754	1756	The Ven. John Hamilton	Son of George Hamilton MP,
1752	1772	Frederick Hamilton	Also held livings at Wellingborough and Stanton;
1772	1781	Charles Leslie	Also Vicar General of Raphoe
1781	1783	John Alcock	Also Prebendary of Drumholm in Raphoe Cathedral
1783	1797	James Montgomery	Collated 23 February 1783.
1798	1814	The Ven. Michael Kearney, D.D.	Also Regius Professor of Law at Trinity College, Dublin from 1776 to 1778.
1818	1835	John Ussher	b Wicklow 1764 - d Belfast 1835.
1835	1845	Brabazon William Disney	Compiled an eight-volume collection of his sermons.
1846	1852	Maurice George Fenwick Bisset	His wife inherited the Bisset of Lessendrum estate.
1852	1877	Frederick Falkiner Goold	Also Private Chaplain to the Lord Lieutenant of Ireland.
1877	1897	Michael Bell Cox	Died before consecration.
1900	1919	John Molloy	Rector of Taughboyne from 1886.
1957	1980	Louis Warden Crooks, OBE (1912–1989)	Also Chaplain to the Forces and the Parliament of Northern Ireland.
1983	2013	Matthew Scott Harte	Also Prebendary of Howth at St Patrick's Cathedral, Dublin from 2007 to 2013.
2013	present	The Venerable David Ian Huss	Also Rector of Donegal.
