= Charles Taylor (priest) =

English priest (1953–2024)

The Very Reverend Charles William Taylor
- Dean of Peterborough
- Church: Church of England
- Province: Canterbury
- Diocese: Diocese of Peterborough
- In office: March 2007 – 2 October 2016
- Predecessor: Michael Bunker
- Successor: Jonathan Baker (acting)
- Other posts: Parish Priest in Northumberland; Dean Emeritus Salisbury Cathedral; Chaplain to the Worshipful Company of Plaisterers; Precentor of Lichfield Cathedral January 1995 – March 2007; Rector of North Stoneham & Bassett, Southampton June 1990 – January 1995

Orders
- Ordination: 1976 (deacon); 1977 (priest)

Personal details
- Born: Charles William Taylor; 16 March 1953
- Died: 21 February 2024 (aged 70)
- Denomination: Anglicanism
- Parents: Richard John Taylor
- Spouse: Catherine
- Children: 2
- Occupation: Priest
- Profession: Precentor Lichfield Cathedral; Tutor in Liturgy Salisbury and Wells Theological College; Rector of North Stoneham and Bassett; Chaplain Westminster Abbey
- Education: St Paul's Cathedral Choir School Marlborough College
- Alma mater: Selwyn College, Cambridge; Ripon College, Cuddesdon

Charles William Taylor (16 March 1953 – 21 February 2024) was an English priest who served as Dean of Peterborough from 2007 to 2016.

== Early life ==
Taylor was born into an ecclesiastical family on 16 March 1953. He was the son of the Reverend Prebendary Richard John Taylor, sometime Vicar of Streetly. His mother Marjorie was a school teacher and supported her husband teaching in the parish Sunday School. He was educated at St Paul's Cathedral Choir School; Marlborough College; Selwyn College, Cambridge; and Ripon College Cuddesdon. During his childhood he was a member of St Paul's Cathedral Choir, later becoming Head Chorister and singing at the State Funeral for Winston Churchill and a memorial service for John F. Kennedy President of the United States following his assassination with his contemporaries including James Lancelot who later became director of music at Durham Cathedral. During his time at St Paul's he learnt the fundamentals of the organ from Sir John Dykes Bower.

He went on to study as a music scholar at Marlborough College then progressed to a choral scholar at Selwyn College reading theology under the Revd John Sweet and the Revd Professor Sir Owen Chadwick. He was ordained a priest in 1977 and his first post was as a Curate at the Collegiate Church of St Peter, Wolverhampton.

== Career ==
Taylor served as a Chaplain at Westminster Abbey from 1979 to 1984 and then the Vicar of Stanmore with Oliver's Battery in the Diocese of Winchester until 1990. He was Rector of North Stoneham and Bassett in the same diocese until 1995 when he became a Tutor in Liturgy at Salisbury and Wells Theological College. He was a Canon Residentiary and Precentor at Lichfield Cathedral for 12 years before his decanal appointment.

During his time as Dean of Peterborough Cathedral he led a number of initiatives including leading the Peterborough900 fundraising appeal to coincide with the 900th anniversary of the cathedral's foundation and provision of step-free access into the building, a new education centre and campaigning on homelessness and poverty in the wider city. He also led the installation of new west front doors, repitching the organ to concern pitch, restoring the mosaic pavement on the presbytery, replacing the lamps on the quire stalls with LED and Oil Candle designed alternatives, replacing the lighting and sound systems.

Taylor and his wife also personally hosted over 2000 people per year in their Deanery house, cooking and cleaning personally to further their ministry.

Taylor also took part in many charity appeals including sleeping rough himself as part of a campaign for rough sleepers in the city.

Taylor retired from his position in 2016 during a cash flow crisis at the institution. In his final sermon was critical of the Church of England leadership.

After his retirement was announced questions were raised in parliament by Michael Fabricant then MP for Lichfield (Taylor was formerly precentor of Lichfield Cathedral) asking the Second Church Estates Commissioner, Caroline Spelman “what assessment the Church of England has made of the appropriateness of procedures and practice relating to the Dean of Peterborough Cathedral standing down”. In an interview with the Church Times Fabricant was critical of the handling of Taylor's retirement and how it had been handled by the Church of England.

== Personal life ==
Taylor was married to Catherine Beeson, (daughter of Trevor Beeson who was Canon at Westminster Abbey whilst Taylor was chaplain to the Congregation there, Beeson later becoming Dean of Winchester). They married in Westminster Abbey and the choir that day was directed by Simon Preston whom Taylor worked closely with to ensure services were properly run. Taylor and Catherine had two children, Rachel and Benedict. His daughter's marriage in the cathedral was the last entry into the book of marriages held in the Cathedral dating back over 4 centuries. A new book was procured following this marriage to ensure the longevity of this ancient document of great local significance.

His father-in-law was responsible for writing obituaries for the Daily Telegraph for Church of England priests. Later in Beeson's life Taylor started to assist his father-in-law with writing the obituaries to assist in the preparation of full, fair and timely obituary publications for fellow clergy.

== Death ==
Taylor died after a long battle with cancer on 21 February 2024, at the age of 70, outliving his initial promising by 6 years. He died following a hip replacement which during his recovery in hospital suffered from exposure to an outbreak of COVID-19 in the ward from which he did not recover.

Church of England titles
Preceded by Michael Bunker	Dean of Peterborough; 2007–2016	Succeeded by Timothy Sledge
