= Clan Bissett =

Scottish clan

- Motto: Abscissa Virescit (That torn down re-grows)
- Clan Bissett no longer has a chief, and is an armigerous clan
- Historic seat: Aboyne Castle
Clan branches
Bisset of Aboyne (historic chiefs)
Bisset of Lessendrum (senior cadets)
Mac Eoin Bissett family (Ireland)
Rival clans
Earls of Atholl (13th century)

Clan Bissett (Bisey, Byset, Bisset or Bissert) is a Scottish clan. The clan is recognised by the Lord Lyon King of Arms but does not have a clan chief recognised by the Lord Lyon King of Arms, therefore the clan has no standing under Scots Law. Clan Bissett is considered an armigerous clan, meaning that it is considered to have had at one time a chief who possessed the chiefly arms; however, no one at present is in possession of such arms. The surname Bissett is also considered a sept of the Clan Fraser of Lovat.

== History ==
=== Origins of the clan ===
The surname Bisset is believed to be of Norman origin. It is said to have been brought to Scotland by Biseys, who accompanied William the Lion returned from captivity in England. The Bysets settled in Nottinghamshire and Derbyshire. Along with other Norman families, they appear to have established themselves and gained land in Morayshire. The family's influence grew, and members of the family witnessed several charters in the 13th and 14th centuries. A charter of Alexander III of Scotland to Paisley Abbey was witnessed by Thomas de Bissat.

The rising fortunes of the family were eclipsed however by a feud with the Earl of Atholl. In 1242 at a tournament held at Haddington, Walter Byset, Lord of Aboyne, was defeated by the youthful Earl of Atholl (possibly Padraig, Earl of Atholl). Allegedly, Byset, in a fit of anger murdered the earl while he slept and then set fire to his house to conceal the crime. Walter Byset and his nephew John then fled to Ireland and then to England. The feud followed the two fugitives as a pardon was later granted to the son of the Earl of Atholl for killing some Bysets in Ireland.

Habakkuk Bisset was a lawyer and Writer to the Signet during the reign of James IV of Scotland.

=== 20th and 21st centuries ===
The principal line of the clan is now that of Bisset of Lessendrum, one of the oldest families in Aberdeenshire.

== Clan profile ==
- Motto: (Latin: Abscissa Virescit - English That torn down re-grows)
- Crest: The trunk of an oak tree sprouting a fresh Proper.

== Castles ==
The following is a list of castles known to have been in the ownership of the family:

Scotland

- Aboyne Castle, just north of Aboyne, Aberdeenshire, is a tall seventeenth century tower house but there was an earlier stronghold there that was held by the Bissets.
- Maryculter House, seven miles to the south west of Aberdeen was held by the Bissets and Walter Bisset of Aboyne established a preceptory of the Knights Templar at Maryculter in 1225.
- Redcastle, Black Isle, was originally a property of the Bissets that dates from the twelfth century. It was later held by the Clan Fraser of Lovat and then the Clan Mackenzie.
- Beaufort Castle, Beauly was originally held by the Bissets but passed by marriage to the Frasers of Lovat in the thirteenth century.
- Kilravock Castle, six miles west of Nairn was also originally a strong hold of the Clan Bisset but passed by marriage to the Clan Rose in the thirteenth century.
- Lessendrum, three and a half miles north east of Huntly was the seat of the longest lasting branch of the clan, the Bissets of Lessendrum.
- Upsettlington Castle, near Upsettington (now Ladykirk), Scottish Borders, was the seat of the Bissets of Upsettlington.

Ireland

- Glenarm Castle, Glenarm, Northern Ireland
- Red Bay Castle, Glenariff, Northern Ireland
- Rathlin Castle, County Antrim, Northern Ireland

== Peerages ==
- Barony of The Aird
- Barony of Lessendrum
- Lord Lovat
- Lord Aboyne
- Lord Beauly
- Lord Beaufort
- Lord of the Glynns
