= Maurice Fenwick Bisset =

This person's surname is Fenwick (pre-1821) or Fenwick Bisset (after 1821), not Bisset (alone).

Maurice George Fenwick Bisset (né Fenwick, also spelt Fenwicke), a graduate of Trinity College, Dublin, was an Irish Anglican priest in the second half of the 19th century. He was Archdeacon of Raphoe from his collation on 29 January 1846 until 1852. He died on 6 August 1879. He assumed the extra surname Bisset by royal licence in 1821, when his wife inherited the Bisset of Lessendrum estate.
