= Knighton baronets =

Extinct baronetcy in the Baronetage of the United Kingdom

Escutcheon of the Knighton baronets of Carlston

The Knighton Baronetcy, of Carlston in the County of Dorset, was a title in the Baronetage of the United Kingdom. It was created on 1 January 1813 for the physician William Knighton. He was later Private Secretary to the Sovereign to George IV. The title became extinct on the death of the second Baronet in 1885.

== Knighton baronets, of Carlston (1813) ==
- Sir William Knighton, 1st Baronet (1776–1836)
- Sir William Wellesley Knighton, 2nd Baronet (1811–1885)

Baronetage of the United Kingdom
Preceded by Leeds baronets	Knighton baronets of Carlston; 1 January 1813	Succeeded by Home baronets
