= Lessendrum =

Coordinates: 57.4624°N 2.7041°W

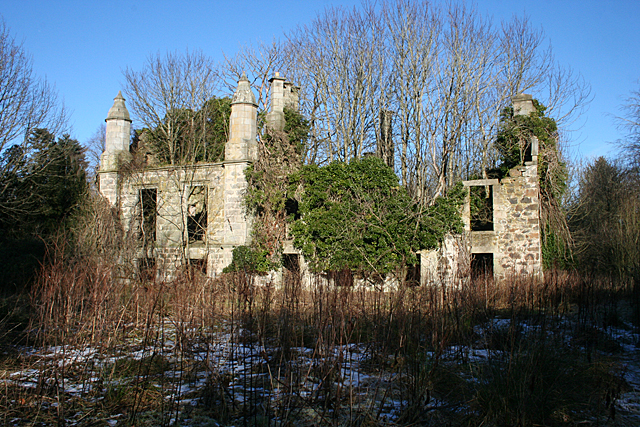
Lessendrum House

Lessendrum is a ruinous fortified house situated 7.65 kilometres (4.75 mi) to the north of Huntly, Aberdeenshire, Scotland. It is on the Buildings at Risk Register.

== History ==
Lessendrum was the ancestral home to the Bisset of Lessendrum family who were granted the estate in 1252. The Bisset's built a fortified house shortly afterwards, which was remodelled in 1470 (L plan), in 1816 and in 1836. The 1836 remodel was undertaken by Architect Archibald Simpson. The house was destroyed by fire in 1928, due to a failure in the heating system in the furnace room. The remains are now overgrown with ivy.
