= Alexander Acland Hood =

Alexander Acland Hood may refer to:

- Sir Alexander Hood, 2nd Baronet (1793–1851), MP for Somerset West
- Sir Alexander Fuller-Acland-Hood, 3rd Baronet (1819–1892), MP for Somerset West
- Alexander Fuller-Acland-Hood, 1st Baron St Audries (1853–1917), MP for Wellington

== See also ==
- Alexander Hood (disambiguation)
- Hood Baronets
