= William Gore-Langton =

William Gore-Langton may refer to:

- William Gore-Langton (1760–1847), MP
- William Gore-Langton (1824–1873), son of the above, MP
- William Temple-Gore-Langton, 4th Earl Temple of Stowe, son of the above, known as William Gore-Langton until 1889
- William Henry Gore-Langton (1802-1875), known as Henry Gore-Langton, MP, son of William Gore-Langton (1760–1847)
