= Alexander Hood =

Alexander or Alex Hood may refer to:

- Admiral Alexander Hood, 1st Viscount Bridport (1726–1814), British Royal Navy admiral
- Alexander Hood (Royal Navy officer) (1758–1798)
- Sir Alexander Hood, 2nd Baronet (1793–1851), MP for Somerset West
- Alexander Hood, 1st Viscount Bridport (British Army officer) (1814–1904), British general and courtier
- Alexander Hood (Governor of Bermuda) (1888–1980), army medical officer and Governor of Bermuda
- Alexander Hood, 4th Viscount Bridport (born 1948), British investment banker
- Alexander Hood, 5th Duke of Bronté (1854–1937), British courtier
- Alexander Fuller-Acland-Hood, 1st Baron St Audries (1853–1917), MP for Wellington
- Alex Hood (folklorist) (1935–2025), Australian singer, writer, actor and folklorist

== See also ==
- Alexander Acland Hood (disambiguation)
