= Paul Pétau =

French publisher and book collector

Paul Pétau (Paulus Petavius in Latin) (1568–1614) was a French publisher and book collector. He was conseiller of the Parlement of Paris from 1588 to 1614.

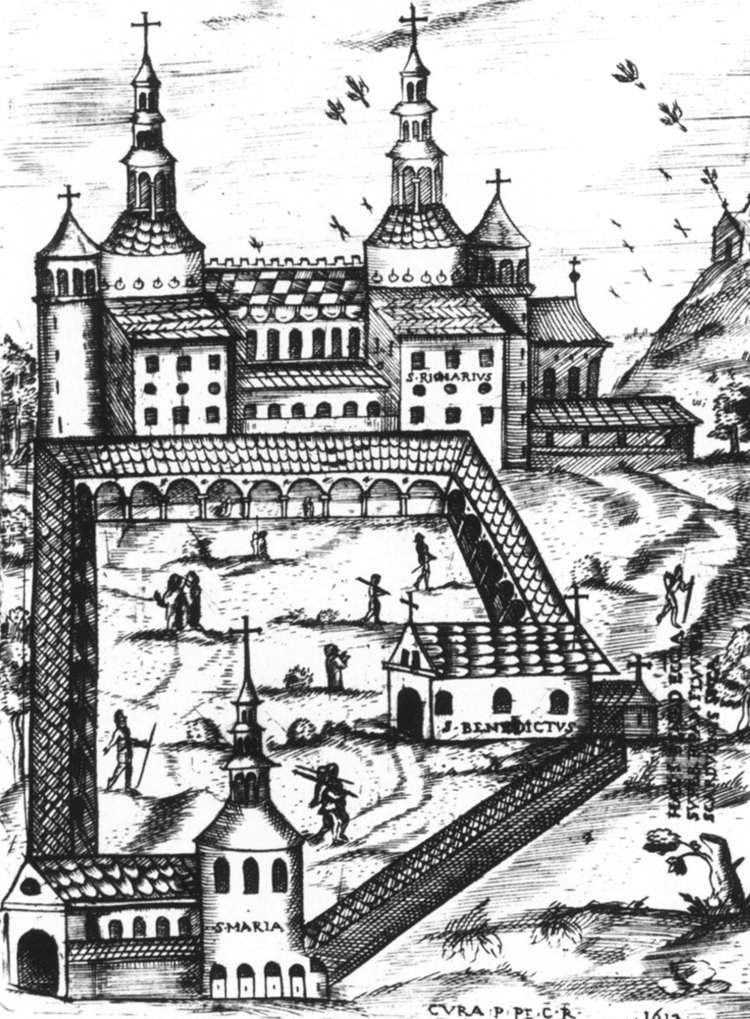
Engraving of Saint-Riquier (1612, Bibliothèque nationale de France) by Paul Petau.

== Life ==
After his death, his son Alexandre Pétau (died 1672) sold his massive collection of books for personal profit.

His books can still be found today in Vatican City's Library and the Library of the University of Leiden.

== Excerpts ==
Charles Isaac Elton's book The Great Book-Collectors provides the following information about Paul Pétau:

Paul Pétau was a man of universal accomplishments. He was the rival of Scaliger in the science of chronology; his doctrinal works are praised as 'a monument of useful labour'; 'he solaced his leisure hours with Greek and Hebrew, as well as Latin verse,' and, according to Hallam's judgment, obtained in the last subject the general approbation of the critics. He formed a valuable museum of Greek, Roman, and Gaulish antiquities, with a cabinet of Frankish coins, to which Peiresc was a generous contributor. His library contained several books that had belonged to Grolier; but it was chiefly remarkable for its mss., of which several were published by Sirmond and Du Chesne among other materials for the history of France. Many of them had been acquired from the collection of Greek and Hebrew books formed by Jean de Saint André, or out of the mass of chronicles, romances, and old French poems belonging to Claude Fauchet, and a large portion came, as we have seen, out of an ancient Benedictine Abbey. Paul Pétau's books of all kinds were left to his son Alexander. The printed books, comprising a number of finely illustrated works on archæology, were sold at the Hague in 1722; the sale included the old library inherited by Francis Mansard, and the mss. relating to Roman antiquities that had been the property of Lipsius. A thousand splendid volumes on parchment, the pride of the elder Pétau, described by all who saw them in terms of glowing admiration, were sold in his son's lifetime to Queen Christina of Sweden.
