= Edward Ayshford Sanford =

British Member of Parliament

Edward Ayshford Sanford FRS (23 May 1794 – 1 December 1871) was a British member of parliament.

He was the only son of William Ayshford Sanford of Nynehead and Lynton, Devon and educated at Eton College (1808–13) and Brasenose College, Oxford. He lived at Nynehead Court, Wellington, Somerset.

Sanford was elected Member of Parliament for Somerset in 1830, sitting until 1832, and then represented Somerset West from 1832 to 1841. He was a justice of the peace (JP) and deputy lieutenant for Somerset, serving as High Sheriff of Somerset for 1848–49.

In 1832 he was elected a Fellow of the Royal Society.

He died in 1871, leaving his estates to his eldest son, William Ayshford Sanford. He had married twice: firstly Henrietta, the daughter of Sir William Langham, 8th Baronet, of Cottesbrooke, Northamptonshire, with whom he had 5 sons (2 of whom predeceased him) and 2 daughters and secondly Lady Caroline Anna Stanhope, the daughter of Charles Stanhope, 3rd Earl of Harrington. His son William was Colonial Secretary of Western Australia (1852–55).

Parliament of the United Kingdom
Preceded by Sir Thomas Lethbridge, Bt; William Dickinson	Member of Parliament for Somerset; 1830 – 1832; With: William Dickinson to 1831; William Gore-Langton from 1831	Constituency abolished
New constituency	Member of Parliament for West Somerset; 1832 – 1841; With: Charles Kemeys-Tynte to 1837; Thomas Dyke Acland from 1837	Succeeded by Thomas Dyke Acland; Francis Dickinson
