= Church of All Saints, Kingweston =

Church in Somerset, England

Church of All Saints
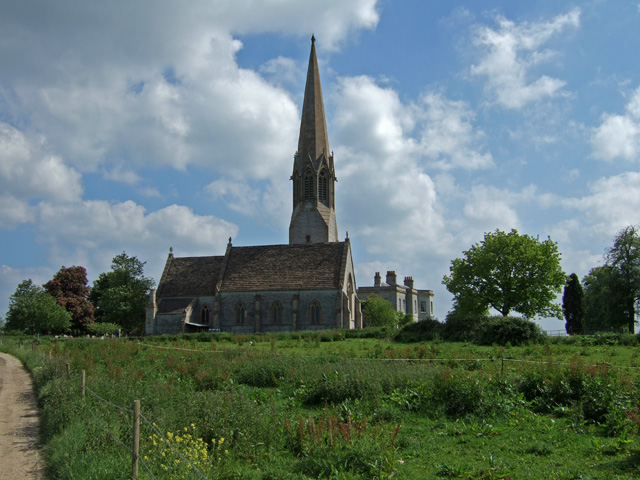

- Location within Somerset
- 51.0793°N 2.6792°W
- Location: Kingweston, Somerset, England

History
- Built for: Francis Dickinson
- Rebuilt: 1852-1855

Site notes
- Architect: Charles Edmund Giles

Listed Building – Grade II*
- Official name: Church of All Saints
- Designated: 17 April 1959
- Reference no.: 1307683

The Anglican Church of All Saints in Kingweston, Somerset, England was rebuilt between 1852 and 1855 by Charles Edmund Giles. It is a Grade II* listed building.

== History ==
A small amount of the fabric of the medieval church on the site, including the doorway, remains but it was largely rebuilt by Charles Edmund Giles between 1852 and 1855. The rebuilding was funded by Francis Dickinson the local member of parliament.

The structure of the church was damaged when bombs exploded nearby during World War II.

The parish is part of the Wheathill Priory Group of Parishes benefice within the Diocese of Bath and Wells.

== Architecture ==
The stone building has Doulting stone dressings and stone slate roofs. It consists of a three-bay nave and two-bay chancel. The single storey tower, which is supported by buttresses, has an octagonal spire.

The interior is all from the 19th century but it does have a 12th-century font.

== See also ==
- List of ecclesiastical parishes in the Diocese of Bath and Wells
