= 1874 West Somerset by-election =

UK Parliamentary by-election

The 1874 West Somerset by-election was held on 12 January 1874. The by-election was held due to the death of the incumbent MP of the Conservative Party, William Gore-Langton. It was won by the Conservative candidate Vaughan Lee, who was unopposed.
