= William Bence Jones =

Anglo-Irish agriculturist (1812–1882)

William Bence Jones (1812–22 June 1882) was an Anglo-Irish agriculturist.

== Life ==
Jones was born at Beccles, Suffolk, in 1812, the eldest son of William Jones, lieutenant-colonel of the 5th dragoon guards, by Matilda, daughter of the Rev. Bence Bence of Thorington Hall, Suffolk. Henry Bence Jones was the second son. William was educated at Harrow School, matriculated on 31 March 1829 at Balliol College, Oxford, and proceeded B.A. in 1834 and M.A. in 1836. He was called to the bar at the Inner Temple, and for a short time went the home circuit.

Late in life Jones's grandfather had bought an estate at Lisselan, County Cork, adjoining the public road from Clonakilty to Bandon. He never visited it, and his son did so only once. In 1838, after embezzlements by the agent in charge, Jones took on its management, and lived there, almost entirely, from 1843 to 1880. He had the main house built in the style of a French château, and created formal gardens.

Bringing knowledge of farming which he had gained in Suffolk, Jones made improvements on the estate, which consisted of about 4000 acres, and farmed 1000 acres himself. He engaged someone to teach his tenants how to grow turnips and clover, he improved the roads, reclaimed more than 400 acres, and consolidated the farms. He was unpopular in the district, however.

In the severe winter of 1879 Jones gave increased employment to neighbouring labourers, but opposed the establishment of public relief works, and when the Land League agitation began he was attacked as an unjust and rack-renting landlord. In December 1880 he refused to accept from his tenants Griffith's Valuation in place of the stipulated rent, and was boycotted. Most of the labourers in his employment deserted him, but he succeeded in carrying on his farm-work with men imported from England and elsewhere.

Although successful in his resistance to the Land League, Jones left Ireland in 1881, and settled in London. He strenuously opposed William Ewart Gladstone's Irish Land Act 1881, advocating emigration and state drainage of wet lands as alternative remedies. He died at 34 Elvaston Place, London, on 22 June 1882.

== Works ==
Jones wrote:

- The Irish Church from the Point of View of its Laymen London, 1868.
- The Future of the Irish Church Dublin, 1869.
- What has been done in the Irish Church since its Disestablishment London, 1875.
- The Life's Work in Ireland of a Landlord who tried to do his Duty London (printed in Edinburgh), 1880; mainly a collection of articles contributed to magazines between 1865 and 1880.

== Family ==
In 1843 Jones married Caroline, daughter of William Dickinson, M.P., of Kingweston, Somerset. His eldest son, William Francis Bence-Jones, educated at Rugby School and Exeter College, Oxford (B.A. in 1878), and called to the bar at the Inner Temple on 26 January 1883, died on 19 November of the same year, and Jones's second son, Reginald, succeeded to the estate.
