= Arthur Hood =

Arthur Hood may refer to:

- Arthur Hood, 1st Baron Hood of Avalon (1824–1901), officer of the Royal Navy during the Crimean War, later First Sea Lord
- Arthur Hood, 2nd Viscount Bridport (1839–1924), British army officer
