= Henry Bence Jones =

English physician and chemist (1813–1873)

Henry Bence Jones FRS
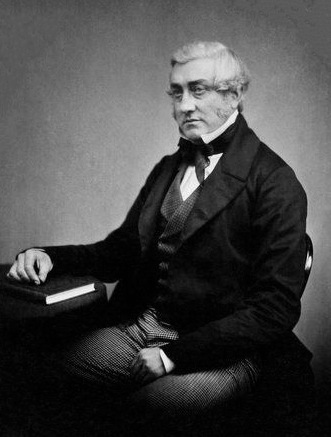
- Born: 31 December 1813; Stoke-by-Nayland, Suffolk
- Died: 20 April 1873 (aged 59); London
- Education: Harrow School
- Alma mater: Trinity College, Cambridge; University of Giessen
- Spouse: Lady Millicent Acheson (m. 1842)
- Children: 7
- Parent(s): William Jones; Matilda Bence Jones
- Relatives: William Bence Jones (uncle)

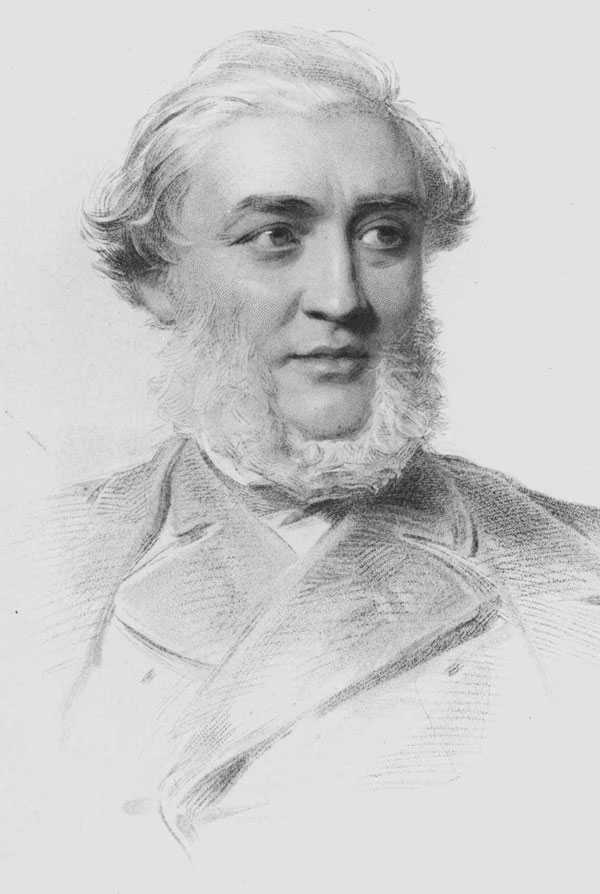
Henry Bence Jones, painting by George Richmond

Henry Bence Jones FRS (31 December 1813 – 20 April 1873) was an English physician and chemist.

== Early life ==
Bence Jones was born at Thorington Hall, Stoke-by-Nayland, Suffolk, the son of Lieutenant Colonel William Jones, an officer in the 5th Dragoon Guards, and Matilda (née Bence) Jones (a daughter of the Rev. Bence Bence of Thorington Hall, Suffolk). His elder brother was the prominent agriculturist William Bence Jones, who married Caroline Dickinson (a daughter of William Dickinson, MP).

He attended school in Hingham, Norfolk, as well as a private school in Putney. He entered Harrow in 1827 and then went up to Trinity College, Cambridge in 1832, obtaining his degree in 1836. He initially worked for an apothecary but subsequently (1838) enrolled to study medicine at St George's Hospital, and in 1839 chemistry at University College, London. In 1841 he went to Giessen in Germany to work at chemistry with Liebig.

== Career ==
On his return he took a post at St George's hospital and after being promoted to assistant physician was elected in 1846 to full physician, resigning on health grounds in 1862. In 1847, he described the Bence Jones protein, a globulin protein found in blood and urine, suggestive of multiple myeloma or Waldenström's macroglobulinemia.

Besides becoming a fellow, and afterwards senior censor, of the Royal College of Physicians, and a fellow of the Royal Society, he held the post of secretary to the Royal Institution for many years. He delivered the Croonian Lecture to the Royal College of Physicians on Matter and Force in 1868.

He wrote, in addition to several scientific books and a number of papers in scientific periodicals, The Life and Letters of Faraday (1870).

== Personal life ==
On 28 May 1842, Bence Jones was married to his second cousin, Lady Millicent Acheson, daughter of Archibald Acheson, 2nd Earl of Gosford and his wife Mary Sparrow. Together, they had seven children.

He died in London on 20 April 1873 and was buried in Kensal Green Cemetery. His widow died on 29 August 1887.

== See also ==
- Bence Jones protein
