= Philip Courtenay =

Philip Courtenay may refer to:

- Philip Courtenay (died 1406) of Powderham
- Philip Courtenay (died 1463) of Powderham
- Philip Courtenay (died 1488) of the Manor of Molland, Devon; or his descendants Philip Courtenay (died 1548) and Philip Courtenay (died 1611)
- Philip Courtenay (politician), British Conservative MP for Bridgwater 1837–1841
- Philip of Courtenay (1243–1283), Emperor of Constantinople
