= Rowland Hood, 3rd Viscount Bridport =

Arms of the Viscount Bridport: 1st and 4th, Azure a fret Argent on a Chief Or three Crescents Sable (Hood); 2nd and 3rd, Or a Cross patonce Sable a Bend Gules surmounted of another engrailed of the field charged with three Bombs fired proper on a Chief undulated Argent waves of the Sea from which a Palm Tree issuant between a Disabled Ship on the dexter and a Battery in Ruins on the sinister all proper over all a Fess wavy Azure thereon inscribed the word "Trafalgar" Or (Nelson)

Rowland Arthur Herbert Nelson Hood, 3rd Viscount Bridport, 6th Duke of Bronte (22 May 1911 – 25 July 1969), of Castello di Maniace, near Bronte, Sicily, was a British naval commander and Conservative politician.

== Origins ==
He was born on 22 May 1911 in Walhachin, near Kamloops, British Columbia, Canada, the son of Lt. Hon. Maurice Henry Nelson Hood (1881-1915), who was killed in action aged 34 during World War I at Gallipoli, the 2nd and eldest surviving son and heir apparent of Col. Arthur Wellington Alexander Nelson Hood, 2nd Viscount Bridport (1839–1924). His mother was Ethel Rose Kendall (c.1890-1931), an actress under the stage-name "Eileen Orme", a daughter of Charles Kendall of Wokingham in Berkshire and a cousin of the actress Denise Orme (1885-1960) (Jessie Smither, Duchess of Leinster).

=== Hon. Maurice Henry Nelson Hood ===
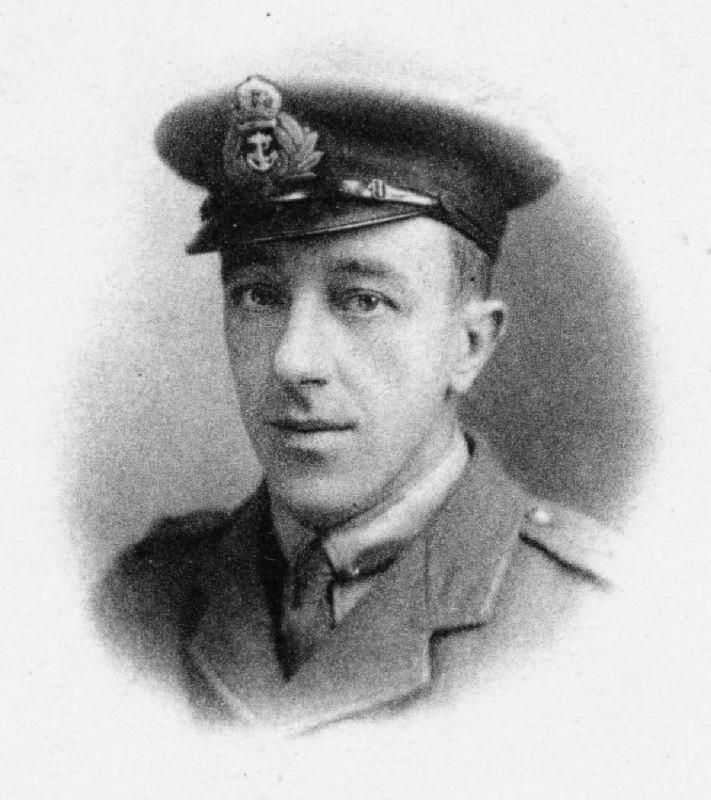
Lt. Hon. Maurice Henry Nelson Hood (1891-1915), killed in action at Gallipoli, father of the 3rd Viscount

Having left school his father Hon. (Maurice Henry) Nelson Hood (1881-1915) joined the Merchant Marine and in 1895 (aged 14) and 1900 was an apprentice on the Brilliant, an iron-hulled sailing ship based in Aberdeen. In 1902 he qualified as a second mate of a foreign-going ship. Having in 1907 been invalided out of the Royal Naval Reserve, he started a career as an insurance broker, but in 1910 was declared bankrupt due to "living beyond his means; inability to find work; illness; and losses by betting and otherwise". He then moved to Walhachin, near Kamloops, British Columbia, where he resumed work in insurance, and where his son the future 3rd Viscount was born. He later moved to Vancouver where in 1912 he became a provisional lieutenant and signalling officer with the 72nd Highlanders of Canada. At the start of World War I he joined the Royal Naval Volunteer Reserve and later served with the Hood Battalion, Royal Naval Division (named after his illustrious three-times great-grandfather Admiral Samuel Hood, 1st Viscount Hood (1724-1816), or after the latter's brother Admiral Alexander Hood, 1st Viscount Bridport (1726-1814), or after their first cousin once removed Admiral Sir Samuel Hood, 1st Baronet (1762-1814)). He was last seen alive at Gallipoli on 4 June 1915 when with 20 other men he came under heavy fire in a trench subsequently re-occupied by Turkish soldiers and is commemorated at the Helles Memorial.

== Career ==
In 1915, when Rowland was aged 4, his father was killed in action during World War I. In 1924, aged 13, he succeeded his grandfather in the Viscountcy. He served in the Royal Navy and achieved the rank of Lieutenant-Commander. From 1939 to 1940 he held political office as a Lord-in-waiting (government whip in the House of Lords) in the National Government of Neville Chamberlain.

== Duke of Bronte ==
In 1937 he became the 6th Duke of Bronte, a Sicilian title inherited from his childless and unmarried great-uncle Alexander Hood, 5th Duke of Bronte (1854-1937) (a younger son of the 1st Viscount Bridport, 4th Duke of Bronte) of Castello di Maniace, Bronte and "La Falconara" (aliter "Villa Nelson"), Taormina, both in Sicily.

He took up residence at the Castello di Maniace. On 27 April 1948 he sold Villa "La Falconara" to Gaetano Marzotto, Count Marzotto (d.1972), of Valdagno near Venice, one of Italy's leading textile manufacturers (see Marzotto Group) and wine-makers, founder of the Jolly Hotels chain and father of the racing driver Gianni Marzotto. Its name was then changed to Villa Marzotto, until its sale in 1973. It was offered for sale in 2020 (variously as "La Falconara" and "Villa Nelson") for 15 million Euros, fully furnished with antique contents.

== Marriages & issue ==
He married twice:

- Firstly in 1934 to Pamela Aline Mary Baker, a daughter of Charles J. Baker, from whom he was divorced in 1945;
- Secondly in 1945 he married Sheila Jeanne Agatha van Meurs (d.1996), a daughter of Johan Hendrik van Meurs, by whom he had issue including:
  - Alexander Nelson Hood (b. 1948), 7th Duke of Bronte, son and heir.

== Death and succession ==
He died in July 1969, aged 58, and was succeeded by his son from his second marriage, Alexander Nelson Hood, 4th Viscount Bridport (b. 1948).

Peerage of the United Kingdom
Preceded by Arthur Wellington Alexander Nelson Hood	Viscount Bridport; 1924–1969	Succeeded by Alexander Nelson Hood
Titles of nobility
Preceded by Hon. Sir Alexander Nelson Hood	Duke of Bronte; Kingdom of the Two Sicilies; 1937–1969	Succeeded by Alexander Nelson Hood
