= Thomas Seaton Forman =

Member of Parliament for Bridgwater
- In office 29 June 1841 – 29 July 1847 Serving with Henry Broadwood
- Preceded by: Henry Broadwood; Philip Courtenay
- Succeeded by: Charles Kemeys-Tynte; Henry Broadwood

Personal details
- Born: 1791
- Died: 30 December 1850 (aged 58–59) Pisa, Italy
- Party: Conservative

Thomas Seaton Forman (1791 – 30 December 1850) was a British Conservative politician.

Forman was the son of William Forman (baptised 1767 and died in 1829), and Mary née Seaton.

Encouraged by his involvement in his family's iron trade, Forman was elected Conservative Member of Parliament (MP) for Bridgwater at the 1841 general election and held the seat until 1847 when he did not seek re-election.

Over the years, he used his inherited wealth to indulge in collecting antiques and objets d'art, before his death in 1850 in Pisa, Italy. He left behind a widow, Elizabeth née Moore, but no children, with the majority of the family wealth being passed to his unmarried brother, William Henry Forman.

In 1849, Forman purchased Pippbrook House in Dorking, Surrey. When he died (just over a year later), the property was inherited by his brother, William Henry Forman.

Parliament of the United Kingdom
Preceded by Henry Broadwood; Philip Courtenay	Member of Parliament for Bridgwater; 1841–1847; With: Henry Broadwood	Succeeded by Charles Kemeys-Tynte; Henry Broadwood
