= Sir Thomas Dyke Acland, 11th Baronet =

British educational reformer and politician (1809-1898)

The Right Honourable Sir Thomas Acland Bt FRS JP
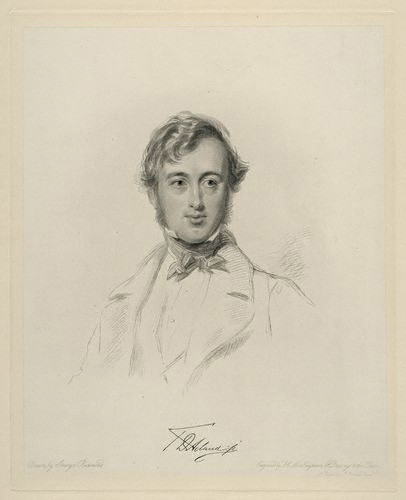

Member of Parliament for Wellington
- In office 1885–1886
- Preceded by: Constituency established
- Succeeded by: Charles Elton

Member of Parliament for Devonshire North
- In office 1865–1885 Serving with Charles Trefusis, Sir Stafford Northcote, John Moore-Stevens
- Preceded by: James Wentworth Buller; Charles Trefusis
- Succeeded by: Constituency abolished

Member of Parliament for Somerset West
- In office 1837–1847 Serving with Edward Ayshford Sanford, Francis Dickinson
- Preceded by: Edward Ayshford Sanford; Charles Kemeys-Tynte
- Succeeded by: Charles Moody; Alexander Hood

Personal details
- Born: Thomas Dyke Acland; 25 May 1809
- Died: 29 May 1898 (aged 89)
- Party: Tory, Liberal
- Spouses: Mary Mordaunt (m. 1841; died 1851) Mary Erskine (m. 1856; died 1892)
- Relations: Sir Henry Acland, 1st Baronet (brother)
- Parent(s): Sir Thomas Dyke Acland, 10th Baronet; Lydia Elizabeth Hoare
- Education: Harrow School
- Alma mater: Christ Church, Oxford

Military service
- Branch/service: Royal 1st Devon Yeomanry
- Rank: Major

Sir Thomas Dyke Acland, 11th Baronet, FRS (25 May 1809 – 29 May 1898) was a British educational reformer and a politician who sat in the House of Commons between 1837 and 1886 initially as a Tory and later, after an eighteen-year gap, as a Liberal.

== Early life ==
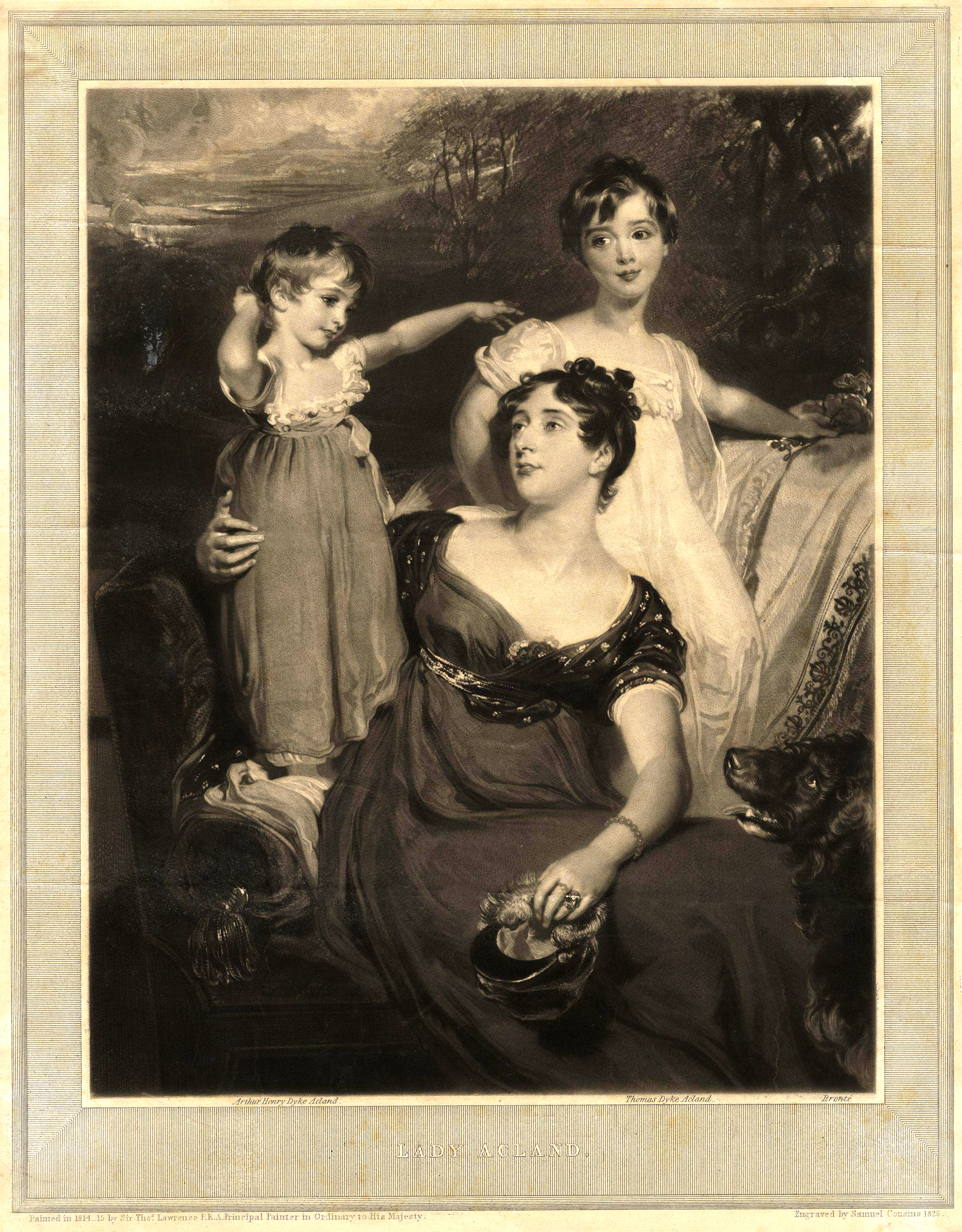
Thomas Dyke Acland (right) with his mother Lydia Elizabeth Hoare (centre) and Arthur Henry Dyke Acland (left). Mezzotint by Samuel Cousins, 1826.

Acland was the eldest son of Sir Thomas Dyke Acland, 10th Baronet and his wife Lydia Elizabeth Hoare. Among his siblings was prominent physician, Sir Henry Wentworth Acland, and politician John Acland.

His paternal grandparents were Sir Thomas Acland, 9th Baronet and his wife Henrietta Anne Hoare (daughter of Sir Richard Hoare, 1st Baronet). His maternal grandfather was Henry Hoare of Mitcham Grove of Hoare's Bank.

He was educated at Harrow and Christ Church, Oxford, where he was friends with William Ewart Gladstone and Lord Elgin among others. In 1839, he was made a Fellow of the Royal Society.

== Career ==
In 1837, Acland entered Parliament for Somerset West as a Tory. During the tensions within the Tory party in the 1840s over the Corn Laws, Acland supported Sir Robert Peel's free trade policy. He did not stand for Parliament in the 1847 general election and was to remain out of the House of Commons for nearly twenty years.

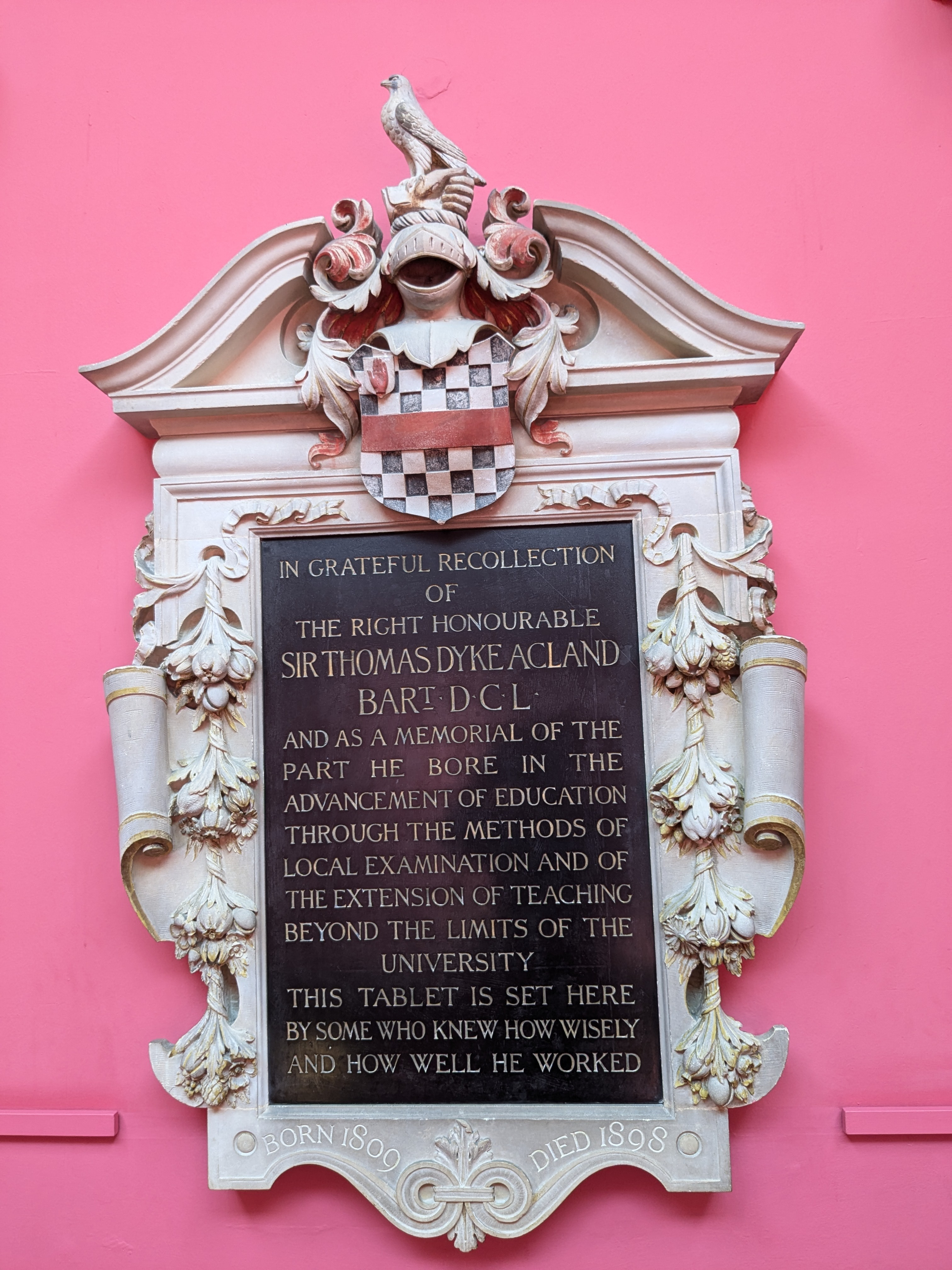
Recollection of Sir Thomas Dyke Acland, 11th Baronet, at the Royal Albert Memorial Museum in Exeter

Acland showed a strong interest in and commitment to educational reform. He initially promoted the maintenance and defence of church schools and the establishment of diocesan theological colleges. However, he later became a supporter of educational projects of a more Liberal character and played a leading role in the establishment of the Oxford local examinations system in 1858. He was also involved in agricultural issues and was a trustee of the Royal Agricultural Society. Acland was influential in the recruitment of Augustus Voelcker as consultant agricultural chemist to the Royal Bath and West of England Society around 1849. Acland served as a major in the Royal 1st Devonshire Yeomanry Cavalry, and when the 1st Administrative Battalion, Devonshire Rifle Volunteer Corps, was formed at Exeter in August 1860, he became its Lieutenant-Colonel. In 1881, when it became the 3rd Volunteer Battalion, Devonshire Regiment, he was made its Honorary Colonel. He was also a justice of the peace for Devon and Somerset. He contested Birmingham as a moderate Liberal in 1859, but was defeated by John Bright.

In 1865, Acland returned to the House of Commons as a Liberal when he was elected as one of two representatives for Devonshire North. Between 1869 and 1874, he served as a Church Estates Commissioner. He never held ministerial office, but was sworn of the Privy Council in 1883. The Devonshire North constituency was abolished by the Redistribution of Seats Act 1885 and Acland was instead returned to Parliament for Wellington. He voted for the First Home Rule Bill in June 1885 and this led to him being defeated at the 1886 general election.

Apart from his public career Acland was also a patron of art. He was a friend of John Ruskin and an early admirer of John Everett Millais.

== Personal life ==
Acland married firstly Mary Mordaunt, daughter of Sir Charles Mordaunt, 8th Baronet, in 1841. Before her death in 1851, they had three sons and two daughters, including:

- Sir Thomas Dyke Acland, 12th Baronet (1842–1919), who married Gertrude Walrond, a daughter of Sir John Walrond, 1st Baronet.
- Mary Lydia Acland (b. 1846), who married the Rev. Richard Hart-Davis in 1872.
- Sir Arthur Dyke Acland, 13th Baronet (1847–1926), who married Alice Cunningham, a daughter of Rev. Francis Macaulay Cunningham.
- Agnes Henrietta Acland (1851–1935), who married Frederick Henry Anson, son of Rev. Frederick Anson.

He married secondly Mary Erskine, only surviving child of John Erskine, in 1856. This marriage was childless. Lady Acland died in May 1892.

Acland survived her by six years and died in May 1898, aged 89. He was succeeded in the baronetcy by his eldest son Thomas, who was also a politician. Acland's second son Arthur, who succeeded to the baronetcy in 1919, also had a successful political career.

== Notes ==
Parliament of the United Kingdom
Preceded by Edward Ayshford Sanford; Charles Kemeys-Tynte	Member of Parliament for Somerset West; 1837–1847; With: Edward Ayshford Sanford 1837–1841; Francis Dickinson 1841–1847	Succeeded by Charles Moody; Alexander Hood
Preceded by James Wentworth Buller; Charles Trefusis	Member of Parliament for Devonshire North; 1865–1885; With: Charles Trefusis 1865–1866; Sir Stafford Northcote 1866–1885; John Moore-Stevens 1885	Constituency abolished
New constituency	Member of Parliament for Wellington; 1885–1886	Succeeded by Charles Elton
Church of England titles
Preceded by John Robert Mowbray	Second Church Estates Commissioner; 1869–1874	Succeeded by George Cubitt
Baronetage of England
Preceded by Thomas Dyke Acland	Baronet (of St Columb John); 1871–1898	Succeeded by Thomas Dyke Acland
