= William Tayleur =

William Tayleur (10 September 1803 – 5 November 1873) was an English Liberal politician who sat in the House of Commons from 1832 to 1835.

Tayleur was the son of John Tayleur of Buntingsdale and his wife Penelope Pearson, daughter of Thomas Pearson of Tottenhall, Staffordshire. He was Deputy Lieutenant of Shropshire and was High Sheriff of Shropshire in 1827.

At the 1832 general election Tayleur was elected Member of Parliament for Bridgwater. He held the seat until 1835.

Tayleur died at the age of 70.

Parliament of the United Kingdom
Preceded by William Thornton Astell; Charles Kemeys-Tynte	Member of Parliament for Bridgwater; 1832 – 1835; With: Charles Kemeys-Tynte	Succeeded by John Temple Leader; Charles Kemeys-Tynte
