= 1911 Wellington by-election =

By-election in the United Kingdom

The 1911 Wellington by-election was held on 21 July 1911. The vacancy came about when the sitting MP Sir Alexander Fuller-Acland-Hood was elevated to the peerage. The by-election was won by the Conservative candidate Dennis Boles.

== Vacancy ==
Sir Alexander Fuller-Acland-Hood had been Conservative MP for Wellington, Somerset since 1892. The seat had been Conservative since it was gained from the Liberals in 1886. He was raised to the peerage as Baron St Audries, of St Audries in the County of Somerset and given a seat in the House of Lords.

== Electoral history ==
Acland-Hood was returned at the last election unopposed. In the previous election before that the result was;

General election January 1910: Wellington
Party	Candidate	Votes	%	±%
Conservative	Alexander Fuller-Acland-Hood	5,216	55.7	+4.2
Liberal	W. King	4,150	44.3	−4.2
Majority		1,066	11.4	+8.4
Turnout		9,366	90.9	+2.1
Conservative hold		Swing	+4.2	

== Candidates ==
Devonian Dennis Boles was chosen by the Conservatives to defend the seat, having never stood for parliament before. The Liberals chose C.H. Dudley Ward, who had stood here in 1906.

== Result ==
The seat was held for the Conservative Party by Dennis Boles.

Wellington by-election, 1911
Party	Candidate	Votes	%	±%
Conservative	Dennis Boles	5,025	53.2	N/A
Liberal	Charles Humble Dudley Ward	4,421	46.8	New
Majority		604	6.4	N/A
Turnout		9,446	88.3	N/A
Conservative hold		Swing	N/A	

== Aftermath ==
A General Election was due to take place by the end of 1915. By the autumn of 1914, the following candidates had been adopted to contest that election. Due to the outbreak of war, the election never took place;

- Unionist: Dennis Boles
- Liberal:

Following boundary changes the seat was abolished and mostly replaced by Taunton

General election 1918: Taunton
Party	Candidate	Votes	%	±%
Unionist	Dennis Boles	12,619	72.4	
Labour	George Woods	4,816	27.6	
Majority		7,803	44.8	
Turnout		17,435		
Unionist win (new seat)				

- Boles was the endorsed candidate of the Coalition Government.
