= Charles Kemeys-Tynte (1800–1882) =

British politician

Charles John Kemeys Tynte or Charles Kemeys-Tynte FRS (9 April 1800 – 16 September 1882) was an English Liberal politician who sat in the House of Commons in two periods between 1832 and 1865.

Tynte was the son of Charles Kemeys Kemeys-Tynte, and his wife Anne Leyson. He was Lieutenant-Colonel of the West Somerset Yeomanry and was appointed Colonel of the Royal Glamorgan Light Infantry militia on 4 January 1849. He commanded the regiment until his retirement in 1862. He was also elected a Fellow of the Royal Society in 1834.

At the 1832 general election, Tynte was elected Member of Parliament for West Somerset. He held the seat until 1837. In 1847 he was elected MP for Bridgwater. He held the seat until 1865.

Tynte died at the age of 82.

Tynte married Elizabeth Swinnerton (daughter of Thomas Swinnerton) on 18 July 1820. He married again, to Vincentia Brabazon (daughter of Wallop Brabazon) on 15 Apr 1841 in Leamington Priors.

Parliament of the United Kingdom
New constituency	Member of Parliament for West Somerset; 1832 – 1837; With: Edward Ayshford Sanford	Succeeded by Thomas Dyke Acland; Edward Ayshford Sanford
Preceded by Thomas Seaton Forman; Henry Broadwood	Member of Parliament for Bridgwater; 1847 – 1865; With: Henry Broadwood to 1852; Brent Follett 1852–57; Alexander William Kinglake from 1857	Succeeded by Alexander William Kinglake; Henry Westropp
