= Charles Kemeys-Tynte (1778–1860) =

English Whig politician

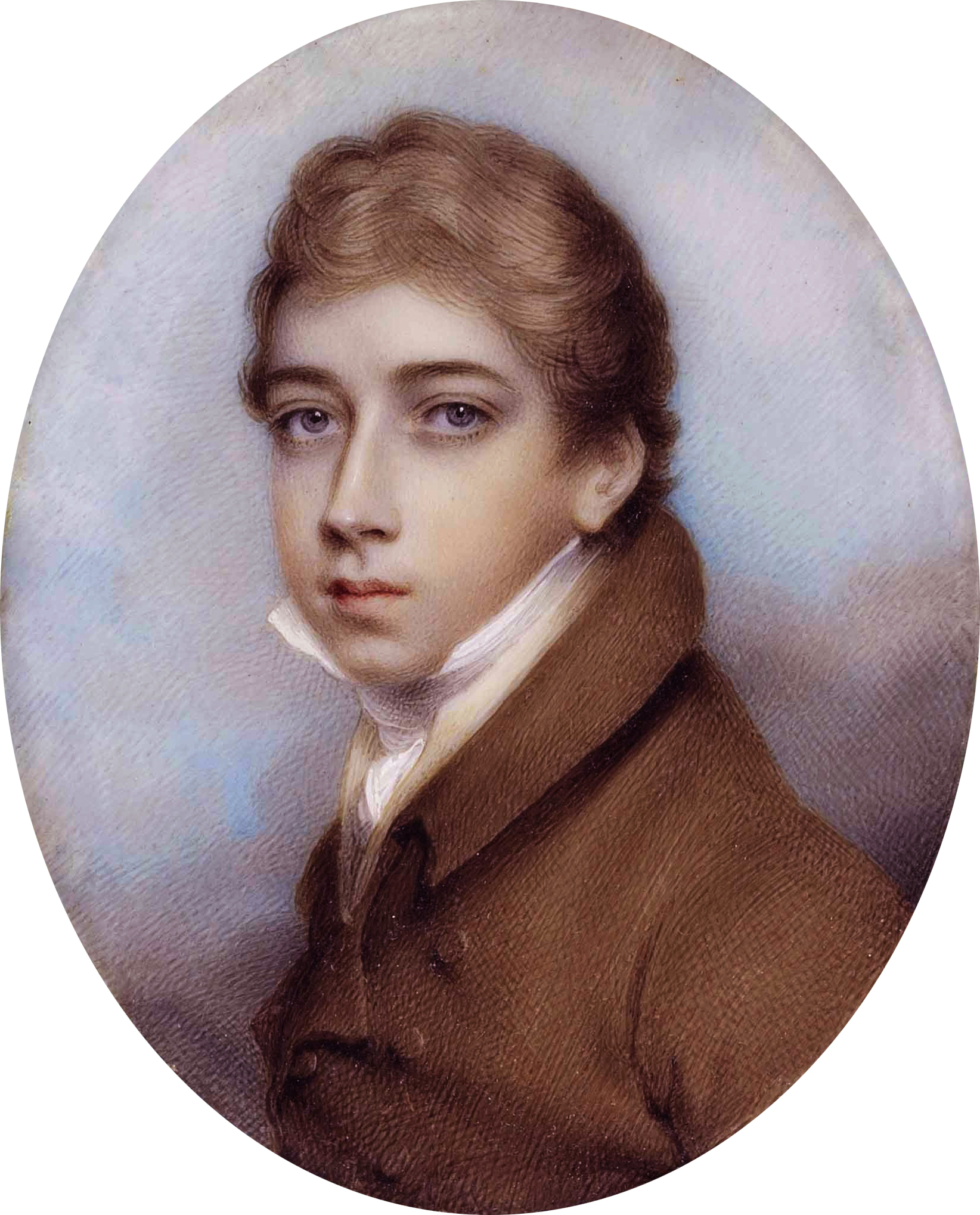
Charles Kemeys Kemeys Tynte (Andrew Plimer)

Charles Kemeys Kemeys Tynte or Charles Kemeys Kemeys-Tynte (29 May 1778 – 22 November 1860) was an English Whig politician who sat in the House of Commons from 1820 to 1837.

== Life ==
Tynte was the son of Colonel John Johnson, who assumed the surname of Kemeys Tynte or Kemeys-Tynte, and his wife Jane Hassell, who was the niece of Sir Charles Tynte, 5th Baronet. He was educated at Eton College and St John's College, Cambridge. He lived at Halsewell House, Somerset and Kevanmably Glamorganshire and was a colonel of the West Somerset Cavalry.

In 1820, Tynte was elected member of parliament for Bridgwater. He held the seat until 1837.

Tynte Street, North Adelaide was named after this man on 23 May 1837.

Tynte died at the age of 82.

== Family ==
Tynte married Anne Leyson, daughter of Rev. Thomas Leyson of Bassaleg. Their son Charles John Kemeys-Tynte was MP for Somerset West and later for Bridgewater.

Parliament of the United Kingdom
Preceded by George Pocock; William Thornton Astell	Member of Parliament for Bridgwater; 1820 – 1837; With: William Thornton Astell to 1832; William Tayleur 1832–35; John Temple Leader 1835–37; Henry Broadwood from 1837	Succeeded by Henry Broadwood; Philip Courtenay
