= William Dickinson (1745–1806) =

British Member of Parliament (1745–1806)

Member of Parliament for Somerset
- In office 1796–1806

Member of Parliament for Rye
- In office 1777–1790

Member of Parliament for Great Marlow
- In office 1768–1774

Personal details
- Born: 13 July 1745
- Died: 26 May 1806 (aged 60)
- Spouse: Philippa Fuller (m. 1771)
- Children: 2+, including William
- Relatives: Hans Sloane (brother-in-law)
- Education: University of Edinburgh

William Dickinson (13 July 1745 – 26 May 1806) was a British politician who sat in the House of Commons between 1768 and 1806.

== Biography ==
Born on 13 July 1745, Dickinson was the eldest son of Sarah (née Prankard), daughter of Graffin Prankard, iron merchant, of Bristol and Caleb Dickinson, merchant, of Bristol. He was probably educated at Westminster School in 1758 and entered the University of Edinburgh in 1765.

Dickinson was returned as Member of Parliament for Great Marlow after a contest at the 1768 general election. He lost his seat at Marlow in 1774. The Fullers had a strong influence at Rye, a Treasury borough, and Dickinson re-entered Parliament as MP for Rye in a by-election on 20 May 1777 succeeding Rose Fuller. He was returned unopposed for Rye in 1780. This was a period in which the West Indies commercial lobby, to which Dickinson belonged as did some of his Fuller relations by marriage, was growing; and was able to head off Edmund Burke's 1780 proposal for gradual abolition of the Atlantic slave trade.

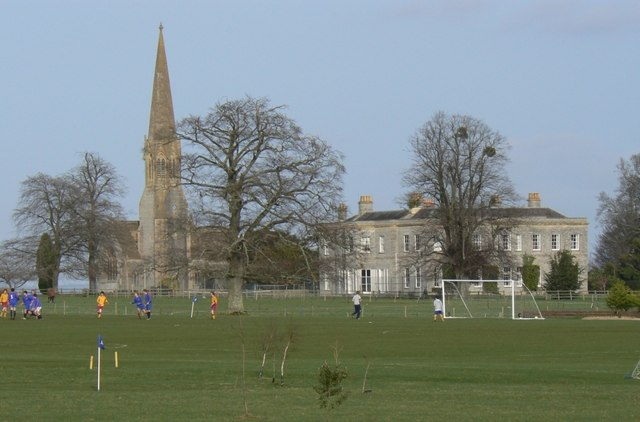
Kingweston House, Somerset - now part of Millfield School

His father died in 1783 and left him his estate at Kingweston, Somerset where he built his new house in the Georgian style between 1785 and 1788 under the supervision of Samuel Heal of Bridgwater. He was also left a share of the Appleton estate in Jamaica which had been granted to the Dickinson family by Charles II.

Dickinson was returned unopposed again in 1784. However he supported the Portland Whigs and this cost him his seat for Rye in 1790. Although he originally owed the seat to his wife's family interest, he was informed by Thomas Lamb, manager of the borough on 11 June: "We should hope it will not be very displeasing to you to retire when the politics of the times run so contrary to your own; to attempt to accomplish your wishes soon with the assurances of your giving your support to government I found would be very hardly combated." Dickinson's offered to come in as locum tenens for his Lamb's son Thomas Phillipps Lamb but this was rejected. Dickinson wrote that he would retire into private life as he could not represent Rye, bearing his "great disappointment" with "the most perfect resignation and good humour". He also wrote to the Duke of Portland that, as a victim of his loyalty to him, he had "a prior claim to anyone to regain that very seat ... or such other as I may approve of". To "his Royal Highness" he wrote that his being thrown out was a measure forced on his constituents and that he had ‘no doubt at a future opportunity of being reinstated".

In August 1792 there was a vacancy for Somerset, where Dickinson's inherited wealth had been invested in the Kingweston estate. He was tempted to offer himself, but made way for Henry Hippisley Coxe. His brother-in-law Hans Sloane congratulated him on not endangering a "constitution so sensible to fatigue". When another vacancy arose on Coxe's death in 1795, Dickinson was again a contender, but made way for William Gore-Langton. By 1796 he was not to be frustrated again and when the veteran Member Sir John Trevelyan, Bt retired at the 1796 general election he was able to come in quietly for the county. His son and heir William was returned for Ilchester at the same time. He retained Somerset in 1802.

== Family ==
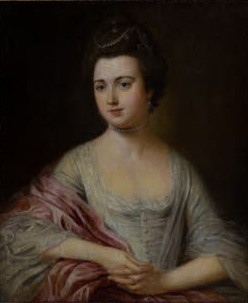
Philippa Fuller, portrait c.1770

In January 1771, he married Philippa Fuller, daughter of Stephen Fuller of Brightling, Sussex and Jamaica. They had at least a son and a daughter. Dickinson died on 26 May 1806.

== Sources ==
Parliament of Great Britain
Preceded by William Clayton; William Mathew Burt	Member of Parliament for Great Marlow; 1768–1774; With: William Clayton	Succeeded by William Clayton (Sir) John Borlase Warren
Preceded by Hon. Thomas Onslow; Rose Fuller	Member of Parliament for Rye; 1777–1790; With: Hon. Thomas Onslow 1777-1784; Charles Wolfran Cornwall 1784-1789; Charles Long 1789-1790	Succeeded by Charles Long; Hon. Robert Banks Jenkinson
Preceded by Sir John Trevelyan, Bt; William Gore-Langton	Member of Parliament for Somerset; 1796–1806; With: William Gore-Langton	Succeeded by Thomas Lethbridge; William Gore-Langton
