= Brent Follett =

British Conservative politician and barrister

Brent Spencer Follett QC (1810 – 23 January 1887) was a British Conservative politician and barrister. Born at Topham, he was the fourth son of Benjamin Follett and his wife Ann Webb, daughter of John Webb. His older brother was William Webb Follett (1796-1845), MP and Solicitor General. He was a student of the Inner Temple from 17 March 1828 and then went to the Lincoln's Inn on 21 November 1829, where he was called to the bar on 7 June 1833.

He became a Queen's Counsel on 11 July 1851 and a bencher four months later on 3 November 1851. In 1852, he entered the House of Commons for Bridgwater, representing the constituency as a Member of Parliament (MP) until 1857. With the Land Registry Act 1862, Follett became the first Chief Land Registrar of the new created HM Land Registry, a post he held until his death in 1887.

On 14 October 1848 at Stockport, he married Caroline Amelia Skirrow, youngest daughter of Walter Skirrow. They had two sons, John Skirrow Follett and William Webb Spencer Follett who would both become barristers.

Parliament of the United Kingdom
| Preceded by Henry Broadwood; Charles Kemeys-Tynte | Member of Parliament for Bridgwater; 1852 – 1857; With: Charles Kemeys-Tynte | Succeeded by Alexander William Kinglake; Charles Kemeys-Tynte |
