= Francis Dickinson (politician) =

English Conservative Party politician

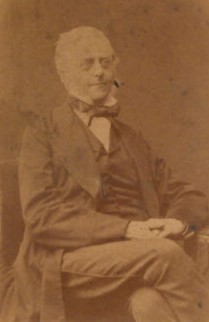
- Photographic portrait of Dickinson, 1872

Member of Parliament for West Somerset
- In office 1841–1847 Serving with Thomas Dyke Acland
- Preceded by: Edward Ayshford Sanford
- Succeeded by: Charles Moody

Personal details
- Born: 6 January 1813
- Died: 17 July 1890 (aged 77)
- Party: Conservative
- Spouse: Caroline Carey (m. 1835)
- Children: 5
- Parent: William Dickinson (father)
- Relatives: William Dickinson (grandfather); Samuel Smith (father-in-law); Thomas Agar-Robartes (son-in-law)
- Education: Trinity College, Cambridge

Francis Henry Dickinson (6 January 1813 – 17 July 1890) was an English Conservative Party politician. He was the Member of Parliament (MP) for West Somerset from 1841 to 1847.

== Life ==
He was the grandson of William Dickinson (1745–1806), the Member of Parliament (MP) for Somerset from 1796 to 1806, and the son of William Dickinson (1771–1837), the MP for Somerset from 1806 to 1831. Francis inherited his father's estates in Somerset and Jamaica. He was educated at Westminster School, and matriculated in 1831 at Trinity College, Cambridge, graduating B.A. in 1835 and M.A. in 1838. He was admitted to the Inner Temple in 1835.

== Family ==
Dickinson married in 1835 Caroline Carey (died 1897), his first cousin. She was daughter of Major-General Thomas Carey of the 3rd Foot Guards, and his first wife Caroline Smith, daughter of Samuel Smith MP of Woodhall Park; they had three sons and two daughters. Their children included:

- William Dickinson (born 1839), married in 1875 Helena Isabella Bairnsfather (died 1888), daughter of George Bairnsfather of the East India Company; and then in 1896 Isabel Frances Harison, daughter of Colonel Evanson Harison R.A.
- Reginald Dickinson (born 1841).
- Arthur Dickinson (born 1847), married in 1873 Alice Berkeley Woodforde, daughter of Augustus Woodforde and widow of the Rev. George Goodden.
- Sophia Caroline.
- Frances.
- Lucy, who married in 1866 William Henry Dorien-Magens (died 1875); then in 1888 the Rev. Iltyd Jenkin Rosser.
- Mary, who married in 1878 Thomas Agar-Robartes, 6th Viscount Clifden.
- Edith.

Parliament of the United Kingdom
Preceded by Edward Ayshford Sanford; Thomas Dyke Acland	Member of Parliament for West Somerset; 1841 – 1847; With: Thomas Dyke Acland	Succeeded by Charles Moody; Sir Alexander Hood, Bt
