= Wellington (Somerset) (constituency) =

Parliamentary constituency in the United Kingdom, 1885–1918

- Former county constituency for the House of Commons

1885–1918
- Seats: one
- Created from: West Somerset
- Replaced by: Bridgwater and Taunton

Wellington (Somerset) is a former county constituency in the United Kingdom, formally known as The Western or Wellington Division of Somerset. It returned one Member of Parliament (MP) to the House of Commons of the Parliament of the United Kingdom, elected by the first past the post voting system, from 1885 until 1918.

== History ==
=== Creation ===
The constituency was created by the Redistribution of Seats Act 1885, and elected its first MP at the 1885 general election. It consisted of part of the previous West Somerset division, a two-member constituency which had existed between 1867 and 1885.

=== Boundaries ===
The constituency consisted of the western end of the county of Somerset, stretching to the suburbs of Taunton, and was predominantly rural and agricultural. Wellington, though the largest town, contributed only about an eighth of the population; other small towns within the division were Minehead, Watchet, Wiveliscombe, Dunster, Dulverton, Williton and Bishop's Lydeard. Although Taunton was a borough electing an MP in its own right, the franchise rules that applied in the 1885–1918 period allowed freeholders in boroughs to qualify for a vote in the adjoining county division as if the borough did not exist, and the Taunton freeholders were a significant presence in the Wellington constituency.

By the time of the First World War, the population of the constituency was about 50,000, rather below the national average.

=== Political character ===
The chief occupation of the population was farming of various types - sheep farming on Exmoor, dairy farming in the Vale of Taunton and arable crops elsewhere - which would have made the constituency naturally Conservative, although the slate quarries around Wellington and Williton would be likely to provide some Liberal voters. But more significant, perhaps, was the influence of the local landowning families, the Luttrells and the Aclands, both of whom were Liberal. This was sufficient to swing the constituency to the Liberals in 1885, but at the next election it was won by the Conservatives, and from 1892 their hold was secured by the choice of Sir Alexander Fuller Acland-Hood as their candidate (he being a relative of the Aclands but a Conservative) - after his initial victory in 1892, the Liberals did not even put up a candidate against him at the next three general elections, and he was returned unopposed. By the time of his elevation to a peerage in 1911, the Wellington division could be regarded as a relatively safe Conservative seat.

=== Abolition ===
The constituency was abolished with effect from the 1918 general election, its voters being divided between the new Taunton and Bridgwater county constituencies.

== Members of Parliament ==
Year	Member	Party
1885	Sir Thomas Acland	Liberal
1886	Charles Elton	Conservative
1892	Sir Alexander Fuller-Acland-Hood	Conservative
1911	Dennis Boles	Unionist
1918	constituency abolished: see Bridgwater and Taunton	

== Elections ==
=== Elections in the 1880s ===
General election 1885: Wellington (Somerset)
Party	Candidate	Votes	%	±%
Liberal	Thomas Dyke Acland	4,299	53.3	
Conservative	Charles Elton	3,760	46.7	
Majority		539	6.6	
Turnout		8,059	84.5	
Registered electors		9,537		
Liberal win (new seat)				

General election 1886: Wellington (Somerset)
Party	Candidate	Votes	%	±%
Conservative	Charles Elton	4,117	56.1	+9.4
Liberal	Thomas Dyke Acland	3,220	43.9	−9.4
Majority		897	12.2	N/A
Turnout		7,337	76.9	−7.6
Registered electors		9,537		
Conservative gain from Liberal		Swing	+9.4	

=== Elections in the 1890s ===
General election 1892: Wellington (Somerset)
Party	Candidate	Votes	%	±%
Conservative	Alexander Fuller-Acland-Hood	4,369	55.6	−0.5
Liberal	William Latham	3,484	44.4	+0.5
Majority		885	11.2	−1.0
Turnout		7,853	82.9	+6.0
Registered electors		9,472		
Conservative hold		Swing	−0.5	

General election 1895: Wellington (Somerset)
Party	Candidate	Votes	%	±%
Conservative	Alexander Fuller-Acland-Hood	Unopposed		
Conservative hold				

=== Elections in the 1900s ===
General election 1900: Wellington (Somerset)
Party	Candidate	Votes	%	±%
Conservative	Alexander Fuller-Acland-Hood	Unopposed		
Conservative hold				

By-election, 1900: Wellington (Somerset)
Party	Candidate	Votes	%	±%
Conservative	Alexander Fuller-Acland-Hood	Unopposed		
Conservative hold				

General election 1906: Wellington (Somerset)
Party	Candidate	Votes	%	±%
Conservative	Alexander Fuller-Acland-Hood	4,558	51.5	N/A
Liberal	Charles Humble Dudley Ward	4,286	48.5	New
Majority		272	3.0	N/A
Turnout		8,844	88.8	N/A
Registered electors		9,960		
Conservative hold		Swing	N/A	

=== Elections in the 1910s ===
General election January 1910: Wellington (Somerset)
Party	Candidate	Votes	%	±%
Conservative	Alexander Fuller-Acland-Hood	5,216	55.7	+4.2
Liberal	Walter King	4,150	44.3	−4.2
Majority		1,066	11.4	+8.4
Turnout		9,366	90.9	+2.1
Conservative hold		Swing	+4.2	

General election December 1910: Wellington (Somerset)
Party	Candidate	Votes	%	±%
Conservative	Alexander Fuller-Acland-Hood	Unopposed		
Conservative hold				

1911 Wellington by-election
Party	Candidate	Votes	%	±%
Conservative	Dennis Boles	5,025	53.2	N/A
Liberal	Charles Humble Dudley Ward	4,421	46.8	New
Majority		604	6.4	N/A
Turnout		9,446	88.3	N/A
Conservative hold		Swing	N/A	

General Election 1914–15:

Another General Election was required to take place before the end of 1915. The political parties had been making preparations for an election to take place and by July 1914, the following candidates had been selected;

- Unionist: Dennis Boles
- Liberal: Charles Humble Dudley Ward

== See also ==
- List of former United Kingdom Parliament constituencies
- Unreformed House of Commons
