= William Gore-Langton (1760–1847) =

British politician

Arms of Gore: Gules, a fesse between three cross-crosslets fitchée or

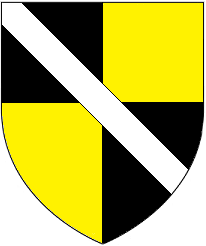
Arms of Langton: Quarterly sable and or, a bend argent, adopted in accordance with the will of his father-in-law Joseph Langton

Colonel William Gore-Langton (December 1760 – 14 March 1847), known as William Gore until 1783, was a British politician. He sat in the House of Commons for 45 years.

== Background ==
Born William Gore, he was the son of Edward Gore and Barbara, daughter of Sir George Browne, 3rd Baronet. This branch of the Gore family descends from Sir John Gore, Lord Mayor of London in 1624, younger son of Gerard Gore, whose elder son Sir Paul Gore, 1st Baronet, of Magharabeg was the ancestor of the Earls of Arran, the Barons Annaly and the Barons Harlech. Montague Gore was his nephew.

== Political career ==
Gore-Langton was Member of Parliament for Somerset between 1795 and 1806 and again between 1812 and 1826, for Tregony between 1808 and 1812 and for Somerset East between 1832 and 1847. He was appointed Colonel of the Oxfordshire Militia on 24 October 1798 and retained the command until his death.

== Family ==
Gore-Langton married firstly Bridget, daughter of Joseph Langton (d. 1779), in 1783, and assumed the same year by Royal licence the additional surname and arms of Langton according to the will of his father-in-law. Through this marriage Newton Park in Somerset came into the Gore family. After Bridget's death in 1793 he married secondly Mary, daughter of John Browne. There were children from both marriages. His son from his first marriage, William Gore-Langton, was the father of William Gore-Langton and the grandfather of William Temple-Gore-Langton, 4th Earl Temple of Stowe while his son from his second marriage, Henry Gore-Langton, represented Bristol in Parliament.

Parliament of Great Britain
Preceded by Sir John Trevelyan, Bt; Henry Hippisley Cox	Member of Parliament for Somerset; 1795–1801; With: Sir John Trevelyan, Bt 1795–1796; William Dickinson 1796–1801	Succeeded by Parliament of the United Kingdom
Parliament of the United Kingdom
Preceded by Parliament of Great Britain	Member of Parliament for Somerset; 1801–1806; With: William Dickinson 1801–1806; Thomas Buckler Lethbridge 1806	Succeeded by Thomas Buckler Lethbridge; William Dickinson
Preceded by James O'Callaghan; Godfrey Wentworth Wentworth	Member of Parliament for Tregony; 1808–1812; With: James O'Callaghan	Succeeded by Alexander Grant; William Holmes
Preceded by Thomas Buckler Lethbridge; William Dickinson	Member of Parliament for Somerset; 1812–1826; With: William Dickinson	Succeeded by William Dickinson; Sir Thomas Buckler Lethbridge
Preceded by William Dickinson; Edward Ayshford Sanford	Member of Parliament for Somerset; 1831–1832; With: Edward Ayshford Sanford	Constituency abolished
New constituency	Member of Parliament for Somerset East; 1832–1847; With: William Papwell Brigstocke 1832–1835; William Miles 1835–1847	Succeeded by William Miles; William Pinney
