= Kingweston Meadows =

Protected area in Somerset, England

- Site of Special Scientific Interest
- Location within Somerset
- Location of Kingweston Meadows.
- Area of search: Somerset
- Grid reference: ST540304
- Coordinates: 51.07107°N 2.65792°W
- Interest: Biological
- Area: 11.5 hectares (0.115 km^{2}; 0.044 sq mi)
- Notification date: 1990

Kingweston Meadows (grid reference ST540304) is an 11.5 hectare (28.4 acre) biological Site of Special Scientific Interest at Kingweston in Somerset, notified in 1990.

This site is an excellent example of an unimproved herb-rich neutral grassland of a type which is now rare in Britain.
