= Robert Edmund Dickinson =

English banker and politician

Member of Parliament for Wells
- In office 1899–1906

Mayor of Bath
- In office 1899

Personal details
- Born: 1 August 1862 London, England
- Died: 1947 (aged 84–85)
- Party: Conservative
- Relatives: Robert Eden (grandfather); William Dickinson (grandfather)
- Education: Trinity College, Cambridge

Robert Edmund Dickinson (1 August 1862 – 1947) was an English banker and Conservative Party politician.

== Life ==
The son of Edmund Henry Dickinson (1821–1896), son of William Dickinson (1771–1837), and his wife Emily Dulcibella Eden, daughter of Robert Eden, 3rd Baron Auckland, Bishop of Bath and Wells, he was from a Somerset background, but was born near London on 1 August 1862. He was educated at Eton College, and matriculated at Trinity College, Cambridge in 1880, graduating B.A. in 1884.

Dickinson went to work in Stuckey's Bank. He was a Justice of the Peace for Somerset, and an officer in the Somerset Imperial Yeomanry. He was elected Member of Parliament for Wells in 1899, as a Conservative, holding his seat until 1906; and also in 1899 was Mayor of Bath. He was a resident of The Albany from 1902 to 1910. In the January 1910 general election he contested St Pancras West unsuccessfully, losing narrowly to the Liberal Sir William Job Collins.

In 1913 Dickinson was working for Parr's Bank, which took over Stuckey's Bank; technically this was an amalgamation, and when it was carried out on 1909, Dickinson was a director of Stuckey's. Later he was a director of the Westminster Bank and the Standard Bank of South Africa.

Dickinson died in 1947.
