= Sir Dennis Boles, 1st Baronet =

British politician (1861–1935)

Boles in 1919.

Sir Dennis Fortescue Boles, 1st Baronet CBE, DL (6 September 1861 – 26 July 1935) was a British Conservative politician.

== Biography ==
Boles was the son of Reverend James Thomas Boles of Ryll Court, Exmouth, Devon. He was educated at Bradfield College and Exeter College, Oxford. Sir Dennis entered Parliament in 1911, upon the elevation to the peerage of Lord St Audries, was returned to Parliament for Wellington, Somerset, in 1911, a seat he held until 1918, and then sat for Taunton from 1918 to 1921. Apart from his political career, Boles was also Lieutenant-Colonel commanding the 3rd (Special Reserve) Battalion, Devonshire Regiment, from 1910, a Justice of the Peace and Deputy Lieutenant of Somerset and for 1923 the High Sheriff of Somerset. He was made a CBE in 1919 and in 1922 he has created a baronet, of Bishop's Lydeard in the County of Somerset.

Boles married Beatrice, daughter of John Lysaght, in 1894. He died in July 1935, aged 74, and was succeeded in the baronetcy by his second but eldest surviving son Gerald. His eldest son, 2nd Lt. Hastings Fortescue Boles, was killed in action in France on 24 May 1915 while serving with the Royal Flying Corps. Lady Boles died in 1939.

Sir Dennis was also a cricketer, and did much to popularise the Exmouth Club. He was a former president of Somerset County Cricket Club. During two and a half years of the Great War he commanded his Special Reserve battalion of the Devonshire Regiment training thousands of reinforcements for the regiment, from which he retired in February 1917 after 32 years of service. His total command was seven years, and on his retirement he was specially mentioned by the Secretary at War for his valuable services.

Sir Dennis founded two private hunting packs, which were for some years run entirely at his own expense. In 1931, he resigned the Mastership of the Quantock Staghounds, but continued as popular leader of the West Somerset Hunt, where he completed 31 years' Mastership — a record.

Up to his death Sir Dennis was president of Taunton Division Conservative Association, and in August 1917 succeeded Lord St. Audries as president of the West Somerset Farmers' Club. He was High Sheriff of Somerset in 1923. Sir Dennis was a supporter of the Taunton and Somerset Hospital, of which he was a life-governor, and he had been president on two occasions. He was also president of Taunton Motor Club, Assistant County Commissioner for the Boy Scouts and Chairman of the Bishops Lydeard Bank.

Parliament of the United Kingdom
Preceded by Sir Alexander Fuller-Acland-Hood	Member of Parliament for Wellington, Somerset; 1911–1918	Constituency abolished
Preceded by Sir Gilbert Wills	Member of Parliament for Taunton; 1918–1921	Succeeded by Sir Arthur Griffith-Boscawen
Baronetage of the United Kingdom
New creation	Baronet (of Bishop's Lydeard); 1922–1935	Succeeded by Gerald Fortescue Boles
