= Charles Moody (MP) =

British politician

Charles Aaron Moody (1792 – 17 December 1867) was a British Conservative Party politician.

He was elected at the 1847 general election as one of the two Members of Parliament for West Somerset, and held the seat until he resigned from the House of Commons on 23 January 1863 by becoming Steward of the Manor of Northstead.

Parliament of the United Kingdom
Preceded by Francis Henry Dickinson; Thomas Dyke Acland	Member of Parliament for West Somerset; 1847 – 1863; With: Sir Alexander Hood, Bt to 1851; William Gore-Langton 1851–1859; Sir Alexander Fuller-Acland-Hood, Bt from 1859	Succeeded by William Gore-Langton; Sir Alexander Fuller-Acland-Hood, Bt
