= West Somerset (constituency) =

Parliamentary constituency in the United Kingdom, 1832–1885

- Former county constituency for the House of Commons
- Context: 1832-1868. Extract from 1837 result: the main striped area at centre
- County: Somerset

1832–1885
- Seats: Two
- Created from: Somerset
- Replaced by: Bridgwater, South Somerset and Wellington

West Somerset or Somerset Western (formally The Western division of Somerset) was the name of a parliamentary constituency in the county of Somerset between 1832 and 1885. It returned two Members of Parliament to the House of Commons of the Parliament of the United Kingdom, elected by the bloc vote system.

== Boundaries ==
=== 1832–1868 ===
1832–1868: The Hundreds of Abdick and Bulstone, Andersfield, Cannington, Carhampton, Crewkerne, North Curry, Houndsborough, Berwick and Coker, Huntspill and Puriton, Kingsbury East, Kingsbury West, Martock, Milverton, North Petherton, South Petherton, Pitney, Somerton, Stone, Taunton and Taunton Deane, Tintinhull, Whitley, and Williton and Freemanors.

The constituency was created for the 1832 general election, when the former Somerset constituency was divided into new East and West divisions. It also absorbed the voters from the abolished boroughs of Ilchester and Minehead. The constituency might have been better described as South-Western Somerset, since it stretched to the southern as well as the western extremities of the county. It surrounded the county town of Taunton (although Taunton was a borough electing MPs in its own right, freeholders within the borough who met the property-owning qualifications for the county franchise could vote in West Somerset as well, as could those in Bridgwater); otherwise, the largest town was Yeovil, but the division also included Chard, Crewkerne, Minehead, Wellington, Ilminster, Street, Watchet and Wiveliscombe; nevertheless, the majority of voters were in the rural areas.

=== 1868–1885 ===
The Second Reform Act changed the limits greatly for the 1868 general election. It gave the county a third division, Mid Somerset into which were moved the eastern end of this seat (including Yeovil, Street and Crewkerne).

The West gained a new main town, Bridgwater, its seats abolished partly for corruption.

=== Abolition ===
The constituency was abolished for the 1885 general election, when those parts of Somerset outside its boroughs were divided into seven single-member county constituencies. West Somerset's voters were divided between the new Bridgwater, South Somerset and Wellington divisions. (The Wellington division, which lasted until 1918, had the alternative name of Western Somerset.)

== Members of Parliament ==
Election	1st Member	1st Party	2nd Member	2nd Party
1832	Edward Ayshford Sanford	Whig	Charles Kemeys-Tynte	Whig
1837	Edward Ayshford Sanford	Whig	Thomas Dyke Acland	Conservative
1841	Francis Dickinson	Conservative	Thomas Dyke Acland	Conservative
1847	Charles Moody	Conservative	Sir Alexander Hood, Bt	Conservative
1851 by-election	Charles Moody	Conservative	William Gore-Langton	Conservative
1859	Charles Moody	Conservative	Sir Alexander Fuller-Acland-Hood, Bt	Conservative
1863 by-election	William Gore-Langton	Conservative	Sir Alexander Fuller-Acland-Hood, Bt	Conservative
1868	William Gore-Langton	Conservative	Hon. Arthur Hood	Conservative
1874	Vaughan Lee (Note: Later adopted the surname Vaughan-Lee)	Conservative	Hon. Arthur Hood	Conservative
1880	Vaughan Lee	Conservative	Mordaunt Bisset	Conservative
1882 by-election	Edward Stanley	Conservative	Mordaunt Bisset	Conservative
1884 by-election	Edward Stanley	Conservative	Charles Elton	Conservative
1885	constituency abolished			

== Election results ==
=== Elections in the 1830s ===
General election 1832: West Somerset
Party	Candidate	Votes	%
Whig	Edward Ayshford Sanford	4,815	45.6
Whig	Charles Kemeys-Tynte	4,299	40.7
Tory	Bickham Escott	1,449	13.7
Majority		2,850	27.0
Turnout		5,812	73.7
Registered electors		7,884	
Whig win (new seat)			
Whig win (new seat)			

General election 1835: West Somerset
Party	Candidate	Votes	%	±%
Whig	Edward Ayshford Sanford	3,770	37.2	−8.4
Whig	Charles Kemeys-Tynte	3,586	35.4	−5.3
Conservative	Bickham Escott	2,766	27.3	+13.6
Majority		820	8.1	−18.9
Turnout		6,323	82.6	+8.9
Registered electors		7,658		
Whig hold		Swing	−7.6	
Whig hold		Swing	−6.1	

General election 1837: West Somerset
Party	Candidate	Votes	%	±%
Conservative	Thomas Dyke Acland	3,883	26.9	+13.3
Whig	Edward Ayshford Sanford	3,556	24.7	−12.5
Conservative	Francis Dickinson	3,524	24.4	+10.8
Whig	Charles Kemeys-Tynte	3,458	24.0	−11.4
Turnout		7,349	83.0	+0.4
Registered electors		8,854		
Majority		425	2.9	N/A
Conservative gain from Whig		Swing	+12.6	
Majority		32	0.3	−7.8
Whig hold		Swing	−12.3	

=== Elections in the 1840s ===
General election 1841: West Somerset
Party	Candidate	Votes	%	±%
Conservative	Thomas Dyke Acland	Unopposed		
Conservative	Francis Dickinson	Unopposed		
Registered electors		9,024		
Conservative hold				
Conservative gain from Whig				

12321

General election 1847: West Somerset
Party	Candidate	Votes	%	±%
Conservative	Charles Moody	3,603	29.2	N/A
Conservative	Alexander Hood	3,311	26.9	N/A
Whig	Philip Pleydell-Bouverie	2,783	22.6	New
Radical	Bickham Escott	2,624	21.3	New
Majority		528	4.3	N/A
Turnout		6,161 (est)	73.1 (est)	N/A
Registered electors		8,433		
Conservative hold		Swing	N/A	
Conservative hold		Swing	N/A	

=== Elections in the 1850s ===
Hood's death caused a by-election.

By-election, 10 April 1851: West Somerset
Party	Candidate	Votes	%	±%
Conservative	William Gore-Langton	Unopposed		
Conservative hold				

General election 1852: West Somerset
Party	Candidate	Votes	%	±%
Conservative	William Gore-Langton	Unopposed		
Conservative	Charles Moody	Unopposed		
Registered electors		8,210		
Conservative hold				
Conservative hold				

General election 1857: West Somerset
Party	Candidate	Votes	%	±%
Conservative	William Gore-Langton	Unopposed		
Conservative	Charles Moody	Unopposed		
Registered electors		7,323		
Conservative hold				
Conservative hold				

General election 1859: West Somerset
Party	Candidate	Votes	%	±%
Conservative	Alexander Fuller-Acland-Hood	Unopposed		
Conservative	Charles Moody	Unopposed		
Registered electors		7,750		
Conservative hold				
Conservative hold				

=== Elections in the 1860s ===
Moody's resignation caused a by-election.

By-election, 17 February 1863: West Somerset
Party	Candidate	Votes	%	±%
Conservative	William Gore-Langton	Unopposed		
Conservative hold				

General election 1865: West Somerset
Party	Candidate	Votes	%	±%
Conservative	William Gore-Langton	Unopposed		
Conservative	Alexander Fuller-Acland-Hood	Unopposed		
Registered electors		8,632		
Conservative hold				
Conservative hold				

General election 1868: West Somerset
Party	Candidate	Votes	%	±%
Conservative	William Gore-Langton	Unopposed		
Conservative	Arthur Hood	Unopposed		
Registered electors		8,632		
Conservative hold				
Conservative hold				

=== Elections in the 1870s ===
Langton's death caused a by-election.

By-election, 12 Jan 1874: West Somerset
Party	Candidate	Votes	%	±%
Conservative	Vaughan Lee	Unopposed		
Conservative hold				

General election 1874: West Somerset
Party	Candidate	Votes	%	±%
Conservative	Vaughan Lee	Unopposed		
Conservative	Arthur Hood	Unopposed		
Registered electors		7,774		
Conservative hold				
Conservative hold				

=== Elections in the 1880s ===
General election 1880: West Somerset
Party	Candidate	Votes	%	±%
Conservative	Vaughan Vaughan-Lee	3,186	34.3	N/A
Conservative	Mordaunt Bisset	3,136	33.8	N/A
Liberal	Thomas Dyke Acland	2,967	31.9	New
Majority		169	1.9	N/A
Turnout		6,128 (est)	73.9 (est)	N/A
Registered electors		8,291		
Conservative hold		Swing	N/A	
Conservative hold		Swing	N/A	

Lee resigned, causing a by-election.

By-election, 26 Apr 1882: West Somerset
Party	Candidate	Votes	%	±%
Conservative	Edward Stanley	Unopposed		
Conservative hold				

Bisset resigned, causing a by-election.

By-election, 18 Feb 1884: West Somerset
Party	Candidate	Votes	%	±%
Conservative	Charles Elton	3,757	55.6	−12.5
Liberal	Frederick Lambart	2,995	44.4	+12.5
Majority		762	11.2	+9.3
Turnout		6,752	71.6	−2.3
Registered electors		9,431		
Conservative hold		Swing	−12.5	
