= Philip Courtenay (politician) =

Philip Courtenay (1782 or 1783 – 10 December 1841) was a British politician.

Born in Bath, Courtenay was educated at St Paul's School and Charterhouse School. He was admitted to Trinity College, Cambridge at the age of 17 in 1799, obtaining a BA in 1805 and an MA in 1808.

Courtenay was admitted at Lincoln's Inn in 1803, and moved to the Inner Temple in 1807. He became a barrister in 1808, a bencher in 1833, and treasurer of the institution in 1841. He also became a Queen's Counsel, practising on the Northern Circuit, and was appointed as standing counsel to the Royal Mint.

In his spare time, Courtenay speculated on annuities, and did research for his friend William Wordsworth on longevity in the Lake District.

At the 1837 UK general election, Courtenay stood for the Conservative Party in Bridgwater, winning the seat. He stood down at the 1841 UK general election, and died later in the year.

Courtenay died in 1841 at the Adelphi Hotel in Liverpool, having apparently overdosed on morphine.

Parliament of the United Kingdom
Preceded by Henry Broadwood; Charles Kemeys-Tynte	Member of Parliament for Bridgwater; 1837–1841; With: Henry Broadwood	Succeeded by Thomas Seaton Forman; Henry Broadwood
