= Sir Alexander Hood, 3rd Baronet =

Politician

Arms of Hood Baronets (later Barons St Audries): Azure, a fret argent on a chief sable three crescents or, being a difference of arms of Hood, Viscount Bridport, with tinctures of chief inverted

Captain Sir Alexander Fuller-Acland-Hood, 3rd Baronet (20 April 1819 – 29 April 1892) was an English Conservative Party politician, landowner and farmer.

Alexander Bateman Periam Hood was born on 20 April 1819 in Bath, Somerset, England, to Sir Alexander Hood, 2nd Baronet, and Amelia Anne Hood (née Bateman). He was educated at the Rugby School. After he married Isabel Harriet Acland in 1849 he had the surnames Fuller Acland added to his name by royal licence. Acland-Hood was chairman of the West Somerset Railway Company and a member of the Somerset County Council.

Acland-Hood was commissioned as a Captain in the Royal Horse Guards. He was High Sheriff of Somerset in 1858 and was a Member of Parliament (MP) for Somerset West from 1859 to 1868.

Acland-Hood died of pneumonia at the family home at St Audries House, West Quantoxhead, Somerset on 29 April 1892, aged 73. He and Isabel had nine children. The eldest, Alexander, succeeded to the baronetcy.

Parliament of the United Kingdom
Preceded by William Gore-Langton; Charles Moody	Member of Parliament for West Somerset; 1859 – 1868; With: Charles Moody to 1863; William Gore-Langton from 1863	Succeeded by William Gore-Langton; Arthur Hood
Baronetage of the United Kingdom
Preceded by Alexander Hood	Baronet (of St Audries); 1851–1892	Succeeded by Alexander Fuller-Acland-Hood
