= Charles Elton (lawyer) =

English lawyer, antiquary, and politician (1839–1900)

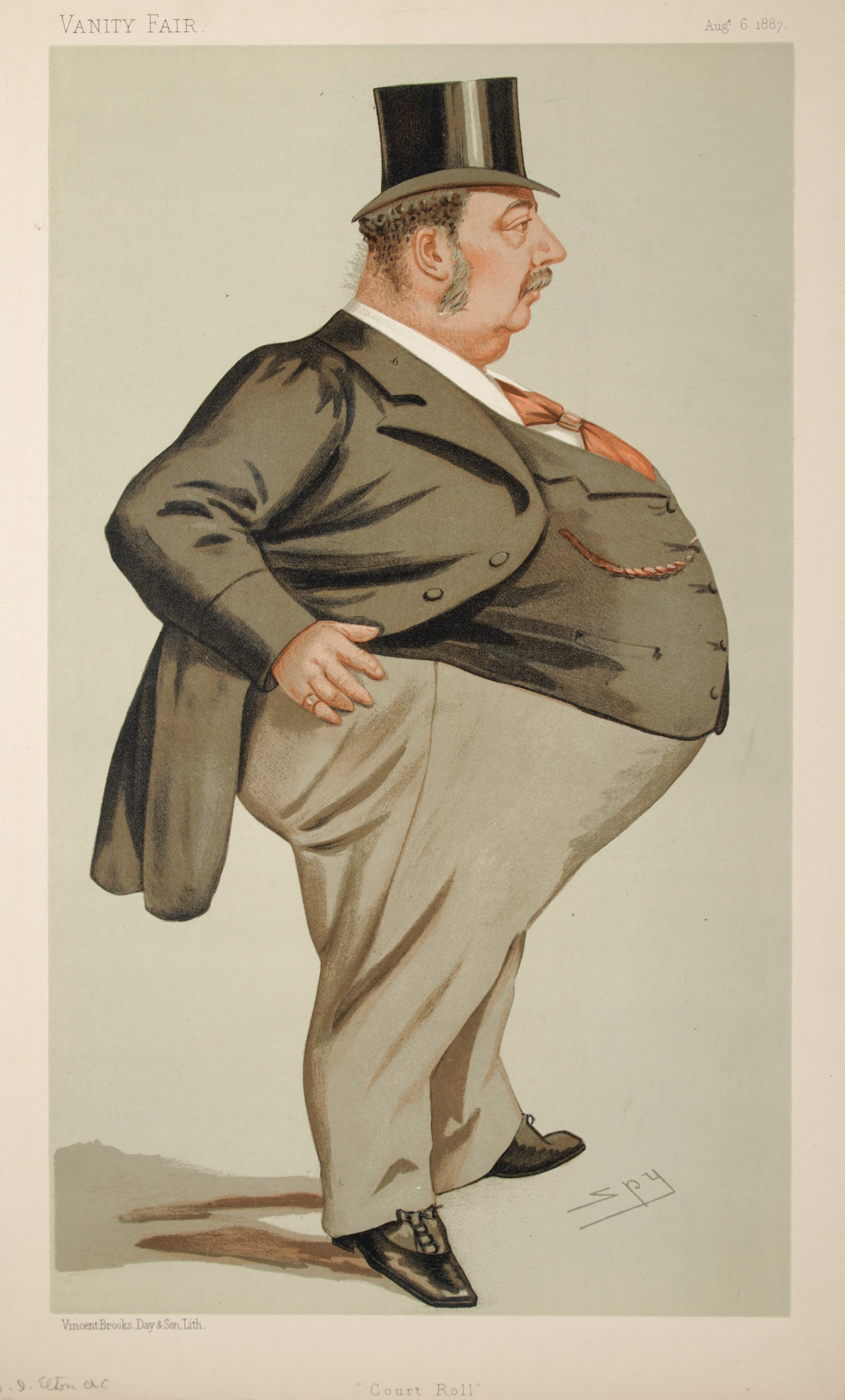
"Court Roll". Caricature by Spy published in Vanity Fair in 1887.

Charles Isaac Elton, QC (6 December 1839 – 23 April 1900) was an English lawyer, antiquary, and politician. He is most famous for being one of the authors of the bestselling book The Great Book-Collectors.

== Biography ==
He was born in Southampton. Educated at Cheltenham and Balliol College, Oxford, he was elected a fellow of Queen's College in 1862. On 6 August 1863 he married Mary Augusta Strachey, a granddaughter of Sir Henry Strachey, 1st Baronet, in Clifton, England. He was called to the bar at Lincoln's Inn in 1865. His remarkable knowledge of old real property law and custom helped him to an extensive conveyancing practice and he took silk in 1885. He sat in the House of Commons for West Somerset in 1884–1885 and for Wellington, Somerset, from 1886 to 1892. In 1869 he succeeded to his uncle's property of Whitestaunton Manor, near Chard, Somerset.

During the later years of his life he retired to a great extent from legal practice, and devoted much of his time to literary work. He died at Whitestaunton.

== Work ==
Elton's principal works were

- The Great Book-Collectors (1864);
- The Tenures of Kent (1867);
- Treatise on Commons and Waste Lands (1868);
- Law of Copyholds (1874);
- Origins of English History (1882);
- Custom and Tenant Right (1882).
- William Shakespeare: His Family and Friends (1903), ed. from posthumous papers by A. Hamilton Thompson

Virginia Woolf often quotes his poem "Luriana Lurilee" in her novel To the Lighthouse (1927), although the poem itself was not published until 1945.

Parliament of the United Kingdom
Preceded by Mordaunt Bisset and Edward Stanley	Member of Parliament for West Somerset; 1884–1885; With: Edward Stanley	Constituency abolished
Preceded by Sir Thomas Dyke Acland	Member of Parliament for Wellington, Somerset; 1886–1892	Succeeded by Sir Alexander Fuller-Acland-Hood
