= The Great Book-Collectors =

1892 book by Charles Elton and Mary Augusta Elton

The Great Book-Collectors was an 1893 book by British authors Charles Elton and Mary Augusta Elton, his wife. It deals with bibliophilia and bibliomania.

The book is generally available online rather than in original in major collections.

== Connection with major collections ==
The book describes in detail the circumstances behind the creation of the following institutions:

- British Library
- Bodleian Library
- Ashmolean Museum

== Reception ==
The book remains an invaluable source of information on the transition from manuscripts to books that occurred in the Middle Ages.

== Copyright status ==
The book is in the public domain in the United States and is available online.
