= Arthur Hood, 2nd Viscount Bridport =

British Army officer

Arms of Hood, Viscount Bridport: Azure, a fret argent on a chief or three crescents sable,

Arthur Wellington Alexander Nelson Hood, 2nd Viscount Bridport CB (15 December 1839 – 28 March 1924) of Guernsey, Channel Islands, was a British Army officer.

== Origins ==
He was the son and heir of General Alexander Hood, 1st Viscount Bridport (1814–1904), 4th Duke of Bronte in Sicily, of Cricket St Thomas in Somerset, by his wife Lady Mary Penelope Hill (d.1884), a daughter of Arthur Hill, 3rd Marquess of Downshire.

== Career ==
He became a captain in the 25th Foot in 1857, retiring from the army in 1870. He served as a Justice of the Peace for Somerset, and was made a Companion of the Order of the Bath on 10 May 1892. He served as a Conservative MP for West Somerset (1868–83). In 1898 his father sold the family seat and estate at Cricket St Thomas in Somerset to the chocolate manufacturer Francis Fry (d.1918), the estate having become heavily mortgaged. In retirement he was Colonel of the West Somerset Yeomanry Cavalry (1872–95). He succeeded to his father's English titles in 1904, aged 65, but his father bequeathed the Sicilian title Duke of Bronte and its accompanying large estate, to his younger son Sir Alexander Nelson Hood, 5th Duke of Bronte (1854–1937), who died unmarried.

== Marriage and issue ==
On 4 April 1872 he married Lady Maria Georgiana Julia Fox-Strangways, a daughter of Hon. John George Charles Fox-Strangways (by his wife Amelia Marjoribanks) and a sister of Henry Fox-Strangways, 5th Earl of Ilchester (1847–1905). By his wife he had issue including:

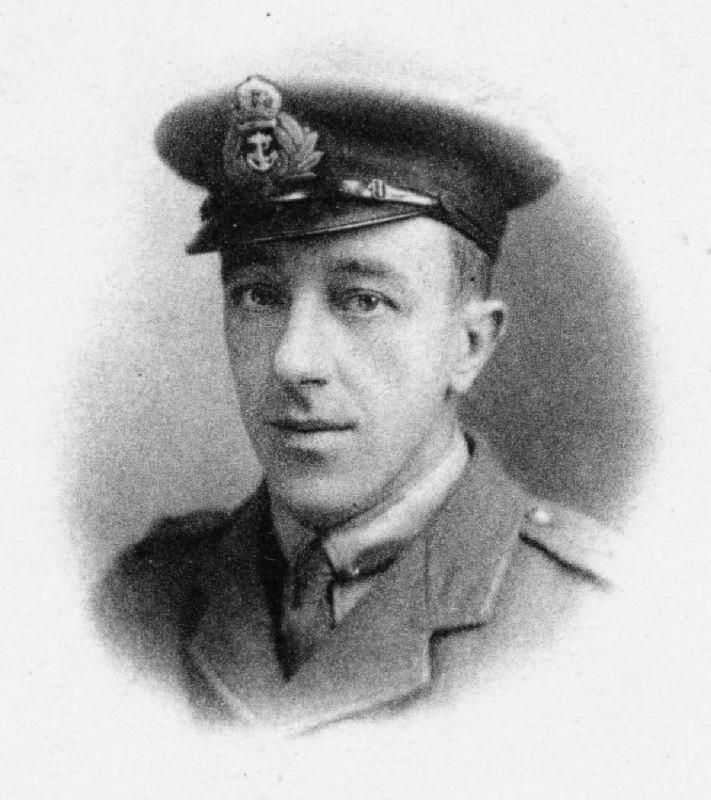
Lt. Hon. Maurice Henry Nelson Hood (1891–1915), son and heir apparent of the 2nd Viscount, killed aged 34 in action at Gallipoli

- Lt. Hon. Maurice Henry Nelson Hood (1881–1915), the 2nd and eldest surviving son and heir apparent, who predeceased his father having been killed in action aged 34 during World War I at Gallipoli. He married Ethel Rose Kendall (c.1890-1931), an actress under the stage-name "Eileen Orme", a daughter of Charles Kendall of Wokingham in Berkshire and a cousin of the actress Denise Orme (1885–1960) (Jessie Smither, Duchess of Leinster). He was the father of:
  - Rowland Hood, 3rd Viscount Bridport, 6th Duke of Bronte (1911–1969) of Castello di Maniace, near Bronte, Sicily, a naval commander and Conservative politician. In 1937 he became the 6th Duke of Bronte, a Sicilian title inherited from his childless and unmarried great-uncle Alexander Hood, 5th Duke of Bronte (1854–1937) (a younger son of Alexander Nelson Hood, 1st Viscount Bridport (1814–1904), 4th Duke of Bronte).
- Mary Hood, wife of Sir Herbert Cook, 3rd Baronet;

== Death & burial ==
He died on 8 Mar 1924 at Surprise Cottage, Route De Passeur, in the parish of Vale, Guernsey, near L'Ancresse Beach and golf club, Channel Islands, and was buried at Vale Parish Church, St Michel du Valle.

Parliament of the United Kingdom
Preceded by Sir Alexander Fuller-Acland-Hood, Bt; William Gore-Langton	Member of Parliament for West Somerset; 1868 – 1880; With: William Gore-Langton to 1874; Vaughan Lee from 1874	Succeeded by Mordaunt Bisset; Vaughan Lee
Peerage of the United Kingdom
Preceded by Alexander Nelson Hood	Viscount Bridport; 1904–1924	Succeeded by Rowland Hood
