= William Dickinson (1771–1837) =

English politician

Member of Parliament for Lostwithiel
- In office 1802

Member of Parliament for Ilchester
- In office 1796

Personal details
- Born: 1771
- Died: 1837 (aged 65–66)
- Spouse: Sophia Smith (m. 1803)
- Children: 5, including Francis
- Parent: William Dickinson (father)
- Relatives: Robert Dickinson (grandson); John F.F. Horner (grandson); Samuel Smith (father-in-law); William Bence-Jones (son-in-law)
- Education: Christ Church, Oxford

William Dickinson (1771–1837) was an English politician, in parliament from 1796 to 1831.

== Life ==
From a Bristol merchant family who were slave owners in Jamaica, he was the eldest son of William Dickinson, also a Member of Parliament, and his wife Philippa Fuller, daughter of Stephen Fuller who was a London West India merchant and Jamaica agent. He was educated at Westminster School and Christ Church, Oxford where he matriculated in 1789, graduating with a B.A. in 1793 and an M.A. in 1795. He came into the family estate at Kingweston on his father's death.

Dickinson entered the House of Commons in 1796 for Ilchester, as a supporter of William Pitt the Younger. He stood successfully for Lostwithiel in 1802, and was a Lord of the Admiralty in the period 1804 to 1806. In 1806 he was elected for Somerset, a seat he held until 1831, and moved his support generally to the Whig opposition. He came to oppose Catholic emancipation.

According to the Legacies of British Slave-Ownership at the University College London, Dickinson was awarded a payment as a slave trader in the aftermath of the Slavery Abolition Act 1833 with the Slave Compensation Act 1837. The British Government took out a £15 million loan (worth £1.43 billion in 2020) with interest from Nathan Mayer Rothschild and Moses Montefiore which was subsequently paid off by the British taxpayers (ending in 2015). Dickinson was associated with five different claims, but two of those were in the capacity of executor. For the three plantations he owned (Appleton Estate, Barton Isles Pen, and Pepper Pen & Bona Vista) in Jamaica, he received £11,978 payment at the time.

== Family ==
Dickinson married in 1803 Sophia Smith, daughter of Samuel Smith MP of Woodhall Park; they had three sons and two daughters. The children included:

- Francis Henry Dickinson (1813–1890) MP, married in 1830 his first cousin Caroline Carey; she was the daughter of Major General Thomas Carey of the 3rd Foot Guards, and his wife Caroline Smith, sister of Sophia Smith.
- Edmund Henry Dickinson (1821–1897), married in 1861 Emily Dulcibella Eden, daughter of Robert Eden, 3rd Baron Auckland, and was father of Robert Edmund Dickinson MP.
- Sophia Gertrude (1814–1902), married in 1840 the Rev. John Stuart Hippisley Horner, and was mother of John Francis Fortescue Horner.
- Caroline (1817–1886), married in 1843 William Bence-Jones.
