= William Gore-Langton (1824–1873) =

British politician (1824–1873)

William Henry Powell Gore-Langton DL, JP (25 July 1824 – 11 December 1873), was a British Conservative Party politician.

== Background and education ==
Gore-Langton was the son of William Gore-Langton, son of William Gore-Langton. His mother was Jacintha Frances Dorothea Collins, daughter of Henry Powell Collins (1776–1854), twice MP for Taunton (1811–1818, 1819–1820) of Hatch Court in Somerset. This branch of the Gore family descends from Sir John Gore, Lord Mayor of London in 1624, younger son of Gerard Gore, whose elder son Sir Paul Gore, 1st Baronet, of Magharabeg was the ancestor of the Earls of Arran, the Barons Annaly and the Barons Harlech. He was educated at Christ Church, Oxford.

== Political career ==
Gore-Langton sat as one of the two members of parliament (MP) for Somerset Western from 1851 to 1859 and again from 1863 to 1873. He also served as a deputy lieutenant and justice of the peace for Somerset.

== Family ==
Gore-Langton married Lady Anna Eliza Mary, daughter of Richard Temple-Grenville, 2nd Duke of Buckingham and Chandos, on 9 June 1846. The ancestral home was Newton Park and they had five children. Lady Anna was in special remainder to the earldom of Temple of Stowe created for her grandfather Richard Temple-Grenville, 1st Duke of Buckingham and Chandos. Gore-Langton died in December 1873, aged 49. Lady Anna died in February 1879. Their eldest son William succeeded as fourth Earl Temple of Stowe in 1892.

Parliament of the United Kingdom
Preceded by Charles Aaron Moody; Sir Alexander Hood, Bt	Member of Parliament for Somerset West; 1851–1859; With: Charles Aaron Moody	Succeeded by Charles Aaron Moody; Sir Alexander Fuller-Acland-Hood, Bt
Preceded by Charles Aaron Moody; Sir Alexander Fuller-Acland-Hood, Bt	Member of Parliament for Somerset West; 1863–1873; With: Sir Alexander Fuller-Acland-Hood, Bt 1863–1868; Hon. Arthur Hood 1868–1873	Succeeded by Hon. Arthur Hood; Vaughan Vaughan-Lee
