= Sir Alexander Hood, 2nd Baronet =

English Conservative Party politician

Arms of Hood Baronets (later Barons St Audries): Azure, a fret argent on a chief sable three crescents or, being a difference of arms of Hood, Viscount Bridport, with tinctures of chief inverted

Sir Alexander Hood, 2nd Baronet (5 July 1793 – 7 March 1851), was an English Conservative Party politician.

He was a Member of Parliament (MP) for Somerset West from 1847 until his death in 1851.

Parliament of the United Kingdom
Preceded by Francis Dickinson; Thomas Dyke Acland	Member of Parliament for West Somerset; 1847 – 1851; With: Charles Moody	Succeeded by Charles Moody; William Gore-Langton
Baronetage of the United Kingdom
Preceded by Samuel Hood	Baronet (of St Audries); 1814–1851	Succeeded by Alexander Fuller-Acland-Hood
