= Alexander Fuller-Acland-Hood, 1st Baron St Audries =

British politician (1853-1917)

The Right Honourable The Lord St Audries Bt PC
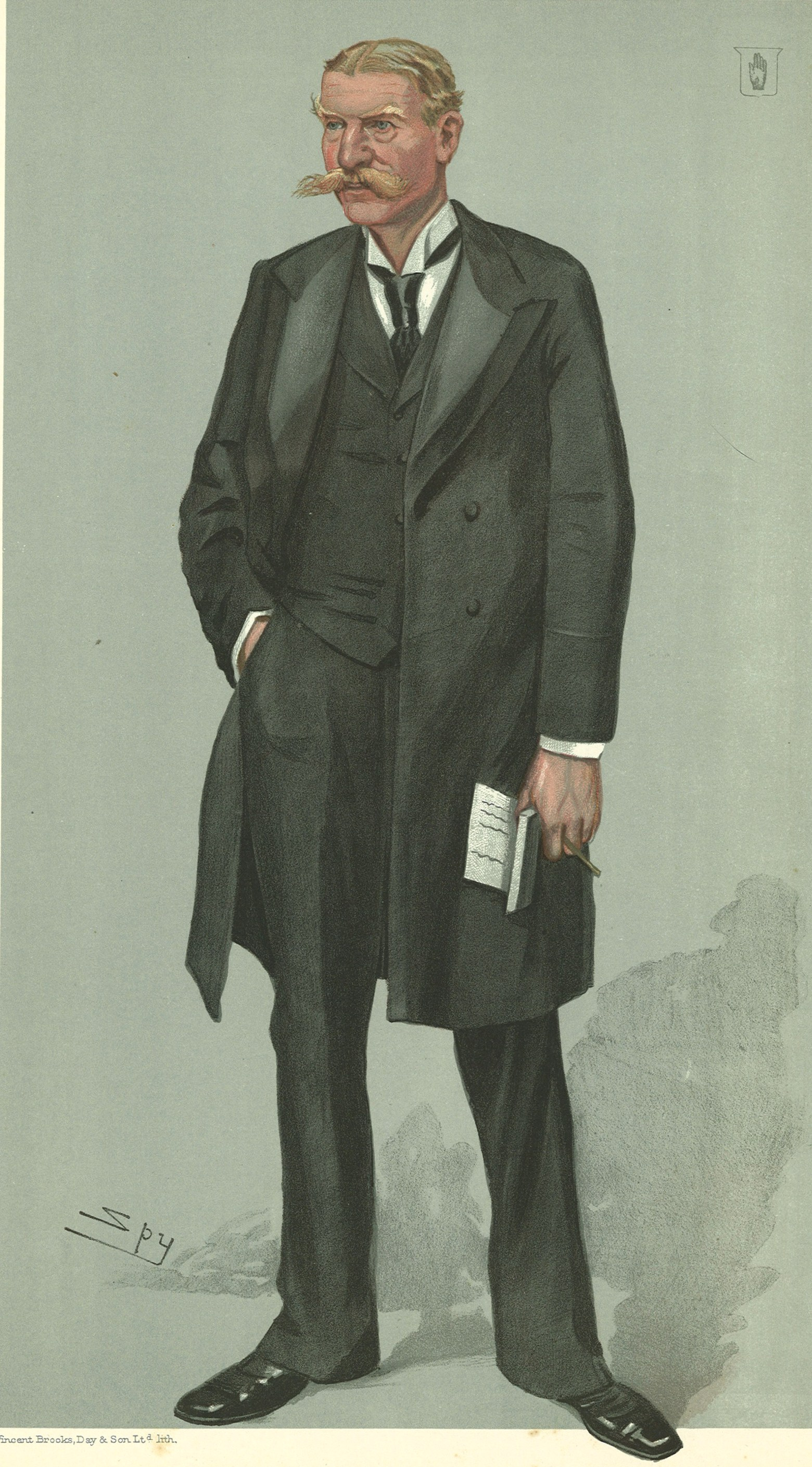
- "1st Conservative Whip". Fuller-Acland-Hood as caricatured by Spy (Leslie Ward) in Vanity Fair, November 1906.

Parliamentary Secretary to the Treasury
- In office 8 August 1902 – 4 December 1905
- Monarch: Edward VII
- Prime Minister: Arthur Balfour
- Preceded by: Sir William Walrond, Bt
- Succeeded by: George Whiteley

Member of Parliament for Wellington
- In office 1892–1911
- Preceded by: Charles Elton
- Succeeded by: Dennis Boles

Personal details
- Born: 26 September 1853
- Died: 4 June 1917 (aged 63)
- Party: Conservative
- Spouse: Hon. Mildred Eveleigh-de-Moleyns (m. 1888)
- Children: 4
- Parents: Alexander Fuller-Acland-Hood (father); Isabel Palmer-Fuller-Acland (mother)
- Relatives: Dayrolles Blakeney Eveleigh-de-Moleyns (father-in-law)

Arms of Hood Baronets (later Barons St Audries): Azure, a fret argent on a chief sable three crescents or, being a difference of arms of Hood, Viscount Bridport, with tinctures of chief inverted

Alexander Fuller-Acland-Hood, 1st Baron St Audries PC (26 September 1853 – 4 June 1917), known as Sir Alexander Fuller-Acland-Hood, Bt, until 1911, was a British Conservative Party politician. He served as Parliamentary Secretary to the Treasury (Chief Whip) under Arthur Balfour from 1902 to 1905.

== Background ==
Fuller-Acland-Hood was the son of Sir Alexander Fuller-Acland-Hood, 3rd Baronet, by his wife Isabel, daughter of Sir Peregrine Palmer-Fuller-Acland, 2nd Baronet. He was a descendant of Alexander Hood, uncle of Lord Hood and Lord Bridport. He succeeded his father in the baronetcy in 1892. In 1905 he also succeeded his kinsman as 6th Baronet of Hartington Hall.

== Political career ==
Fuller-Acland-Hood sat as Member of Parliament for Wellington, Somerset from 1892 until 1911. He was appointed Vice-Chamberlain of the Household under Lord Salisbury in 1900, a post he held until November 1902, and then served as Parliamentary Secretary to the Treasury (Chief Whip) under Arthur Balfour from August 1902 until 1905. He was sworn of the Privy Council in 1904 and raised to the peerage as Baron St Audries, of St Audries in the County of Somerset, in 1911.

== Family ==
Lord St Audries married the Hon. Mildred Rose Evelyn, daughter of Dayrolles Blakeney Eveleigh-de-Moleyns, 4th Baron Ventry, in 1888. They had two sons and two daughters. He died in June 1917, aged 63, and was succeeded in his titles by his eldest son, Alexander. Lady St Audries died in October 1949.

Parliament of the United Kingdom
| Preceded by Charles Elton | Member of Parliament for Wellington; 1892–1911 | Succeeded by Dennis Boles |
Political offices
| Preceded by Ailwyn Fellowes | Vice-Chamberlain of the Household; 1900–1902 | Succeeded by The Lord Wolverton |
| Preceded by Sir William Walrond, Bt | Parliamentary Secretary to the Treasury; 1902–1905 | Succeeded by George Whiteley |
Baronetage of the United Kingdom
| Preceded by Edward Dolman Scott | Baronet (of Hartington Hall); 1905–1917 | Succeeded by Alexander Fuller-Acland-Hood |
| Preceded by Alexander Fuller-Acland-Hood | Baronet (of St Audries); 1892–1917 | Succeeded by Alexander Fuller-Acland-Hood |
Peerage of the United Kingdom
| New creation | Baron St Audries; 1911–1917 | Succeeded by Alexander Fuller-Acland-Hood |
