= Taunton by-election =

Taunton by-election may refer to:

- 1701 Taunton by-election
- 1724 Taunton by-election
- 1754 Taunton by-election
- 1873 Taunton by-election
- 1880 Taunton by-election
- 1887 Taunton by-election
- 1909 Taunton by-election
- 1912 Taunton by-election
- 1921 Taunton by-election
- 1956 Taunton by-election
