= Northmore =

Northmore is a surname. Notable people with the surname include:

- John Northmore (judge) (1865–1958), Australian judge
- John Northmore (MP) for Taunton (UK Parliament constituency)
- Luke Northmore (born 1997), English rugby union player
- Ryan Northmore (born 1980), English football goalkeeper
- Samuel Northmore (1872–1946), English rugby union player
- Thomas Northmore (1766–1851), English writer, inventor and geologist
- Thomas Northmore (politician) (c.1643–1713), English barrister and politician
- William Northmore (1690–1735), British landowner and politician

== See also ==
- Augustus Welby Northmore Pugin (1812–1852), English architect, designer, and theorist of design
