= Lunnon =

Lunnon is an English surname and may refer to

- James Lunnon (1897–1954), an English-born artist and engineer who worked in the US
- James Lunnon (trade unionist) (1869–1952), an English trade unionist and political activist
- Jane Lunnon (born 1969), an English schoolteacher, head of Alleyn's School
- Sarah Lunnon, English climate activist and former politician
