= William Marchaunt (disambiguation) =

William Marchaunt was a 14th-century MP for Taunton.

William Marchaunt may also refer to:

- William Marchaunt (MP for Rye)
- William Marchaunt (MP for Chipping Wycombe), represented Chipping Wycombe (UK Parliament constituency)
