= John Northmore =

John Northmore may refer to:

- John Northmore (judge), 20th century Australian judge
- John Northmore (MP) (died 1415/16), merchant and MP for Taunton
