= Boyle baronets =

Baronetcy in the Baronetage of the United Kingdom

- Escutcheon of the Boyle baronets of Ockham
- Creation date: 1904
- Status: extant
- Motto: God's providence is my inheritance

The Boyle Baronetcy, of Ockham in the Parish of Salehurst in the County of Sussex, is a title in the Baronetage of the United Kingdom. It was created on 14 December 1904 for Edward Boyle, a barrister, businessman and Conservative Member of Parliament for Taunton. His grandson, the third Baronet, was also a Conservative Member of Parliament and ultimately cabinet minister serving as Minister of Education from 1962 to 1964. He was made a life peer as Baron Boyle of Handsworth, of Salehurst in the County of Sussex, in 1970 and became vice-chancellor of the University of Leeds in the same year. The life peerage became extinct on his death in 1981 and he was succeeded in the baronetcy by his younger brother, the fourth Baronet. As of 2026 the title is held by the latter's eldest son, the fifth Baronet, who succeeded in 1983.

== Boyle baronets, of Ockham (1904) ==
- Sir Edward Boyle, 1st Baronet (1848–1909)
- Sir Edward Boyle, 2nd Baronet (1878–1945)
- Sir Edward Charles Gurney Boyle, Baron Boyle of Handsworth, 3rd Baronet (1923–1981)
- Sir Richard Gurney Boyle, 4th Baronet (1930–1983)
- Sir Stephen Gurney Boyle, 5th Baronet (born 1962)

The heir presumptive is the present holder's brother Michael Desmond Boyle (born 1963).

== Notes ==
Baronetage of the United Kingdom
Preceded by Flannery baronets	Boyle baronets of Ockham; 14 December 1904	Succeeded by Heath baronets
