= Hatch Court =

Country house in Hatch Beauchamp, Somerset, England

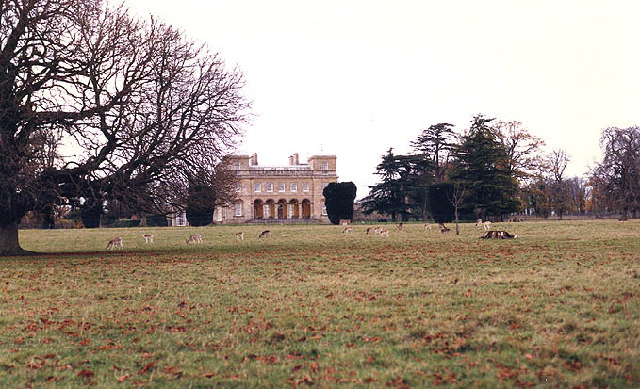
Hatch Court, main entrance front, viewed in 1989 from within the deer park

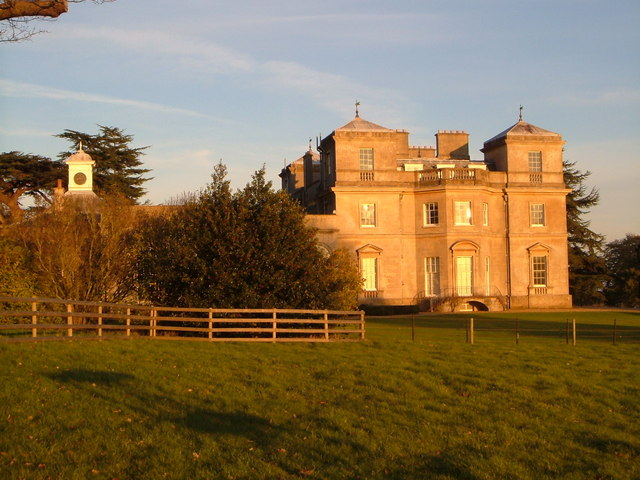
Hatch Court, side view

Hatch Court in the parish of Hatch Beauchamp, in Somerset, England, is a grade I listed mansion built in about 1755 in the Palladian style with Bath Stone by the wool merchant John Collins to the design of Thomas Prowse. The site had been occupied since the mediaeval era by various forms of the manor house of the manor of Hatch, the caput of an important feudal barony first held by the Anglo-Norman de Beauchamp family in the 11th century.

== History ==
John Collines was a wool merchant who built the house in about 1755. He employed as his architect Thomas Prowse a Member of Parliament who designed houses for his friends and had previously designed the nearby Temple of Harmony and had been consulted regarding the building of Hagley Hall in Worcestershire.

== Architecture ==
The two-storey Bath stone building is in the Palladian style with four square angle towers each of three storeys. The main entrance is via a loggia of five round-headed arches. The interior includes a large hall and a staircase with stone treads and wrought iron balusters.

== Outbuildings and grounds ==
The gardens contain a walled vegetable garden. During the 18th century extensive pleasure gardens existed which included a grotto with a pool and fireplace.

The stable block was built in about 1820 following the demolition of the original stable block designed by Prowse. At the same time a horse engine house was built as a horse mill to power farm machinery, since used for storage, but some of the original machinery including the drive shaft is still in situ.

The gardens were restored by Dr Robin Odgers and his wife Janie, who occupied the house from 1984 to its sale in 2000. There are listed, Grade II, on the Register of Historic Parks and Gardens of special historic interest in England.

== Museum ==
The house once contained a small military museum commemorating the life and work of Brigadier Andrew Hamilton Gault, a decorated Boer War hero who served as Member of Parliament for Taunton and as a member of the Quebec Chamber of Commerce. He was the founder of the last privately raised regiment in the British Empire, the Princess Patricia's Canadian Light Infantry. Hamilton Gault was buried on the estate. His wife continued to live at Hatch Court until 1972.

== See also ==
- List of Grade I listed buildings in Taunton Deane

== Sources ==
- Sanders, I.J. English Baronies: A Study of their Origin and Descent 1086–1327, Oxford, 1960, p. 51, Hatch Beauchamp, Somerset
- Batten, John, The Barony of Beauchamp of Somerset, published in Proceedings of the Somerset Archaeological and Natural History Society, Vol.36.
- Cookson, Christopher, Hatch Beauchamp Church, section: Historical Note on the Church and its Associations, 1972
- Burke's Genealogical and Heraldic History of the Landed Gentry, 15th Edition, ed. Pirie-Gordon, H., London, 1937, p. 872, Gault of Hatch Court
