= John Bond (classicist) =

English physician and classical scholar

John Bond (1550 – 3 August 1612) was an English physician and classical scholar who also served twice as Member of Parliament (MP) for Taunton.

Born at Trull in Somerset and educated at Winchester College and New College, Oxford, he became a Master of Arts in 1579 and soon afterwards was appointed Master of the Free School at Taunton (an appointment in the gift of New College). Although unqualified in medicine, he also began to practise as a doctor, and became highly respected as a physician. He came to be more noted, however, for the commentaries he published on classical literature, notably that on Horace which subsequently were included in many European editions of the poet's works; also important was his Commentaries on Persius, published after his death by his son-in-law.

Bond was elected MP for Taunton in the parliaments of 1601 and 1604–1611, and it is considered likely also that he was the John Bond who was chief secretary to the Lord Chancellor, Sir Thomas Egerton. He died in 1612 and was buried in Taunton parish church. The antiquary Anthony à Wood described him as "a polite and rare critic, whose labours have advanced the commonwealth of learning very much".

== Major works ==
- Quinti Horatii Flacci Poemata scholiis sive annotationibus, quae brevis Commentarii vice esse possint illustrata (London, 1606, afterwards reprinted at Leyden, Frankfurt, Hanover, Amsterdam, Leipzig, etc.)
- Auli Persii Flacci Satyrae sex, cum posthumis Commentariis Joannis Bond (London, 1614, afterwards at Paris, Amsterdam, Nuremberg, etc.)
