= Henry James, 1st Baron James of Hereford =

Anglo-Welsh lawyer and statesman (1828–1911)

The Right Honourable The Lord James of Hereford GCVO PC KC
- Lord James of Hereford, 1882

Solicitor General for England and Wales
- In office 26 September 1873 – 20 November 1873
- Monarch: Victoria
- Prime Minister: William Ewart Gladstone
- Preceded by: Sir George Jessel
- Succeeded by: Sir William Vernon Harcourt

Attorney General for England and Wales
- In office 20 November 1873 – 17 February 1874
- Monarch: Victoria
- Prime Minister: William Ewart Gladstone
- Preceded by: Sir John Coleridge
- Succeeded by: Sir John Burgess Karslake
- In office 3 May 1880 – 9 June 1885
- Monarch: Victoria
- Prime Minister: William Ewart Gladstone
- Preceded by: Sir John Holker
- Succeeded by: Sir Richard Webster

Chancellor of the Duchy of Lancaster
- In office 4 July 1895 – 11 August 1902
- Monarchs: Victoria; Edward VII
- Prime Minister: The Marquess of Salisbury; Arthur Balfour
- Preceded by: The Viscount Cross
- Succeeded by: Sir William Walrond, Bt

Personal details
- Born: 30 October 1828
- Died: 18 August 1911 (aged 82)
- Party: Liberal; Liberal Unionist
- Education: Cheltenham College

Henry James, 1st Baron James of Hereford, GCVO, PC, KC (30 October 1828 – 18 August 1911), known as Sir Henry James between 1873 and 1895, was an Anglo-Welsh lawyer and statesman. Initially a Liberal, he served under William Ewart Gladstone as Solicitor General in 1873 and as Attorney-General between 1873 and 1874 and 1880 and 1885. However, he broke with Gladstone over Irish Home Rule and joined the Liberal Unionists. From 1895 to 1902 he was Chancellor of the Duchy of Lancaster in the Unionist ministries of Lord Salisbury and Arthur Balfour.

== Background and education ==
James was the son of Philip Turner James, a surgeon of Hereford, and Frances Gertrude, daughter of John Bodenham. His father's family was descended from the Gwynnes of Glanbran, Carmarthenshire, described in the nineteenth century as "one of the oldest in the Empire". His grandfather, Gwynne James, was also a surgeon, while his great-grandfather, another Gwynne James, was an apothecary. He was educated at Cheltenham College.

== Legal and political career ==
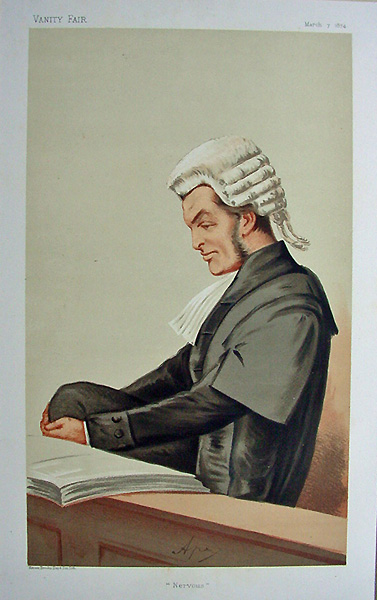
Sir Henry James, MP, "Nervous" by Ape, Vanity Fair 7 March 1874

James was admitted to the Middle Temple on 12 January 1849 and was called to the bar on 16 January 1852. He joined the Oxford circuit, where he soon established a notable reputation. In 1867 he was made postman of the Exchequer of pleas, and in 1869 took silk. At the 1868 general election he represented parliament for Taunton as a Liberal, unseating Edward William Cox after an election petition heard in March 1869. He held the seat until 1885, when he was returned for Bury. He attracted attention in parliament by his speeches in 1872 in the debates on the Judicature Act.

In September 1873 James was made Solicitor General by William Ewart Gladstone. Already in November 1873, he was promoted to Attorney General by Gladstone, a post he held until the government fell the following year. He received the customary knighthood at the time of his promotion. When Gladstone returned as prime minister in 1880 James resumed this office. He was responsible for introducing the Corrupt Practices Act 1883 and guiding it through parliament. In 1885 he was sworn of the Privy Council.

In 1886, he represented Sir Charles Dilke in the Crawford divorce case alongside Sir Charles Russell QC in which Dilke was accused of adultery with his brother's wife's sister. James and Russell, with disastrous consequences, advised Dilke not to go into the witness box saying there was insufficient evidence to convict him. The judge agreed, but decided Mrs Crawford's confession was sufficient to award her husband a divorce, resulting in an apparently contradictory verdict: that she had committed adultery with Dilke, but he had not with her! Their advice has been called "some of the worst professional advice that any man can ever have received". At a second hearing instigated by the Queen's Proctor, Dilke was cross-examined to devastating effect and his career ruined.

On Gladstone's conversion to Irish Home Rule, James distanced himself from him and became one of the most influential of the Liberal Unionists. Gladstone had offered him the Lord Chancellorship in 1886, but he declined it and the knowledge of the sacrifice he had made in refusing to follow his old chief in his new departure lent great weight to his advocacy of the Unionist cause in the country. He was one of the leading counsel for The Times before the Parnell Commission, and from 1892 to 1895 was Attorney General to the Prince of Wales. In 1895 he was raised to the peerage as Baron James of Hereford, in the County of Hereford. From 1895 to 1902 he was a member of Lord Salisbury's and Arthur Balfour's Unionist ministries as Chancellor of the Duchy of Lancaster. In later years he was a prominent opponent of the Tariff Reform movement, adhering to the section of Free Trade Unionists. On 11 August 1902, he was appointed to the Royal Victorian Order as a Knight Grand Cross (GCVO).

== Personal life ==
Lord James of Hereford died unmarried in August 1911, aged 82. By his mistress Alice, whom he refused to marry, daughter of Robert Hardwicke (d.1874) of London, he left a daughter Alice Henland (1868–1936), who married Lt. Col. George Talbot Lake Denniss, Royal Wilts. Regt. The barony became extinct on his death.

His portrait was painted by John St Helier Lander, collection of Middle Temple; his 1893 photo-portrait by Alexander Bassano is in the National Portrait Gallery. Lord James (Sir Henry James at the time) was also president of Bury Golf Club during the 1890s, during which time a championship trophy was awarded in his honour.

Parliament of the United Kingdom
Preceded by Alexander Charles Barclay; Edward William Cox	Member of Parliament for Taunton; 1869–1885; With: Alexander Charles Barclay 1869–1880; Sir William Palliser 1880–1882; Samuel Allsopp 1882–1885	Succeeded by Samuel Allsopp (representation reduced to one member 1885)
Preceded by Robert Needham Philips	Member of Parliament for Bury; 1885–1895	Succeeded by James Kenyon
Legal offices
Preceded by Sir George Jessel	Solicitor General; September 1873 – November 1873	Succeeded by Sir William Vernon Harcourt
Preceded by Sir John Coleridge	Attorney General; 1873–1874	Succeeded by Sir John Karslake
Preceded by Sir John Holker	Attorney General; 1880–1885	Succeeded by Sir Richard Webster
Political offices
Preceded by The Viscount Cross	Chancellor of the Duchy of Lancaster; 1895–1902	Succeeded by Sir William Walrond, Bt
Peerage of the United Kingdom
New creation	Baron James of Hereford; 1895–1911	Extinct
