= 1900 Manchester South by-election =

UK Parliamentary by-election

The 1900 Manchester South by-election was held on 25 May 1900. The seat had become vacant when the Liberal Unionist Member of Parliament, the Marquess of Lorne had succeeded to the peerage as Duke of Argyll on the death of his father, George Campbell, 8th Duke of Argyll on 24 April 1900. The Marquess of Lorne had been Member of Parliament for the constituency since 1895.

== Candidates ==
The Liberal Unionist candidate was William Peel. Peel was the son of Arthur Peel, 1st Viscount Peel. Peel had been the London County Council member for Woolwich since a by-election on 24 February 1900. Peel represented the Municipal Reform Party on the L.C.C. which was aligned with the Conservative Party.

The Liberal Party candidate was Leif Jones. Jones was the secretary to Rosalind Howard, Countess of Carlisle, and an executive member of the United Kingdom Alliance, a temperance movement. Jones had contested Westminster in 1892 and Leeds Central in 1895 as a Liberal candidate.

== Result ==
The Liberal Unionist Party held the seat with a greatly increased majority.

1900 Manchester South by-election
Party	Candidate	Votes	%	±%
Liberal Unionist	William Peel	5,497	61.4	+11.0
Liberal	Leifchild Jones	3,458	38.6	−11.0
Majority		2,039	22.8	+22.0
Turnout		8,955	76.0	−4.7
Registered electors		11,788		
Liberal Unionist hold		Swing	+11.0	
