= Robert Bathe =

English politician

Robert Bathe (fl. 1397–1249) was an English politician. He sat as MP for Taunton in 1406 and portreeve of Taunton from Michaelmas 1410 till 1411 and 1413 till 1414.

He married Tiffany.
