= William Portman (died c. 1413) =

Member of the Parliament of England

William Portman was an English politician who served as the Member of Parliament for Taunton in various parliaments during the late 14th and early 15th centuries. He was a significant landowner in Taunton, and also served as a tax collector in the town.

== Life and career ==
William Portman was the son of Richard Portman and his wife Christine. One of his ancestors had previously served in Parliament during the reign of Edward I, and his parents owned twelve or more messuages in Taunton. Portman was first returned as a Member of Parliament for Taunton in 1362, the 37th Parliament of Edward III. He was returned on and off eleven times in total, spanning over 40 years, gaining election for the final time in 1406, to the 6th Parliament of Henry IV. He married Alice Crosse, and had one son, Walter Portman, who later served as the Member of Parliament for Taunton himself.

Portman served as a tax collector in Taunton in 1384, 1385, 1402 and 1406. He died around 1413, and was buried in Taunton Priory.
