= David Nicholson (British politician) =

British politician (born 1944)

David John Nicholson (born 17 August 1944) is a former Conservative Party politician in the United Kingdom.

== Early life ==
Before being elected he worked at the Conservative Research Department in the 1970s and 80s.

== Parliamentary career ==
Nicholson fought Walsall South in 1983, being defeated by Labour's Bruce George by 702 votes. He was member of parliament for Taunton from 1987 to 1997, being elected to the traditional Conservative seat after Edward du Cann left Parliament in 1987 and was elected again in 1992.

He lost the seat in the 1997 General Election to Jackie Ballard by 2,443 votes with the swing of 4.6% away from the Conservatives small compared to the national average swing.

== After Parliament ==
He is now a consultant at public affairs company Butler Kelly Ltd.

Parliament of the United Kingdom
Preceded by Sir Edward du Cann	Member of Parliament for Taunton; 1987–1997	Succeeded by Jackie Ballard
