= William Palliser =

Irish-born politician and inventor (1830–1882)

Sir William Palliser CB MP (18 June 1830 – 4 February 1882) was an Irish-born politician and inventor, Member of Parliament for Taunton from 1880 until his death.

== Early life ==
Born in Dublin on 18 June 1830, Palliser was the fourth of the eight sons of Lieutenant Colonel Wray Bury Palliser (1788–1862), of Derryluskan, County Tipperary, by his marriage to Anne Gledstanes, a daughter of John Gledstanes of Annesgift, County Tipperary. After Rugby School, he was educated first at Trinity College Dublin, to which he was admitted in 1849, and next at Trinity Hall, Cambridge, where he matriculated in 1851. He later attended the Staff College at Sandhurst.

He was a brother of Captain John Palliser, a geographer and explorer.

== Career ==
Palliser was admitted a member of the Inner Temple in Jan 1854. In 1854, he was granted a patent for the invention of "improvements in projectiles for fire-arms and ordnance generally". He was then described as "William Palliser, of Comeragh in the county of Waterford, Esquire".

In April 1855 Palliser was commissioned as an ensign into the Rifle Brigade. He was promoted lieutenant on 1 August 1855 and in 1857 was appointed an instructor of Musketry. He saw active service in the Crimean War after the fall of Sevastopol. He was transferred with the rank of Lieutenant to the 18th Light Dragoons in 1858, promoted captain in 1859 and major in 1864, before retiring from the regular British Army in 1871, after seven years on half-pay.

In 1870, he was one of two directors of The Land and Sea Telegraph Construction Company Ltd. as it applied to be wound up, the other being Augustus Anson VC MP. Palliser was then "of No. 126 Belgrave-road, Pimlico."

Palliser patented 21 ordnance-related inventions, including the armour-piercing Palliser shot. He designed the "Palliser conversion" technique which was used successfully to convert many of Britain's obsolescent but still serviceable smoothbore muzzle-loading guns into more modern rifled muzzle-loaders ("RML") in the late 1860s and the 1870s.

In 1868 he was appointed a Companion of the Order of the Bath and in 1873 was knighted by Queen Victoria at Osborne House.

In 1875, he became a lieutenant colonel in the 2nd Middlesex Artillery Volunteers.

Palliser was a Conservative Member of Parliament for Taunton, in Somerset, from 1880 until his death.

He developed land in North End, Fulham in London, part of which was sold after his death and became the Queen's Club in West Kensington. In particular, the area of Barons Court, where the surrounding street names are all references to his family.

== Private life ==
In November 1868, Palliser married Hanna Maria Perham (1843–1923), eldest daughter of George Perham. In 1880 he was living in Earl's Court Square, Kensington. He died in 1882 of heart disease and was survived by his wife and four children. He is buried in Brompton Cemetery, London.

== Arms ==
Coat of arms of William Palliser
Notes Granted 17 January 1910 by Nevile Wilkinson, Ulster King of Arms. Crest Out of a coronet Gules a demi-eagle wings elevated Or charged on the breast with a cross crosslet Vert. Escutcheon Quarterly 1st & 4th per pale Sable and Argent three lions rampant counterchanged (Palliser) 2nd & 3rd Vert a cross crosslet Or (Bury). Motto Deo Volente

== See also ==
- Palliser shot
- RML 64 pounder 71 cwt gun : a gun made using Palliser's conversion
- RML 80 pounder 5 ton gun : conversion of ML 68-pounder to RML 80-pounder using Palliser's method

Parliament of the United Kingdom
Preceded by Henry James; Alexander Charles Barclay	Member of Parliament for Taunton; 1880 – 1882; With: Henry James	Succeeded by Henry James; Samuel Charles Allsopp
