= Hamilton Gault =

Brigadier Andrew Hamilton Gault DSO, OBE, ED, CD
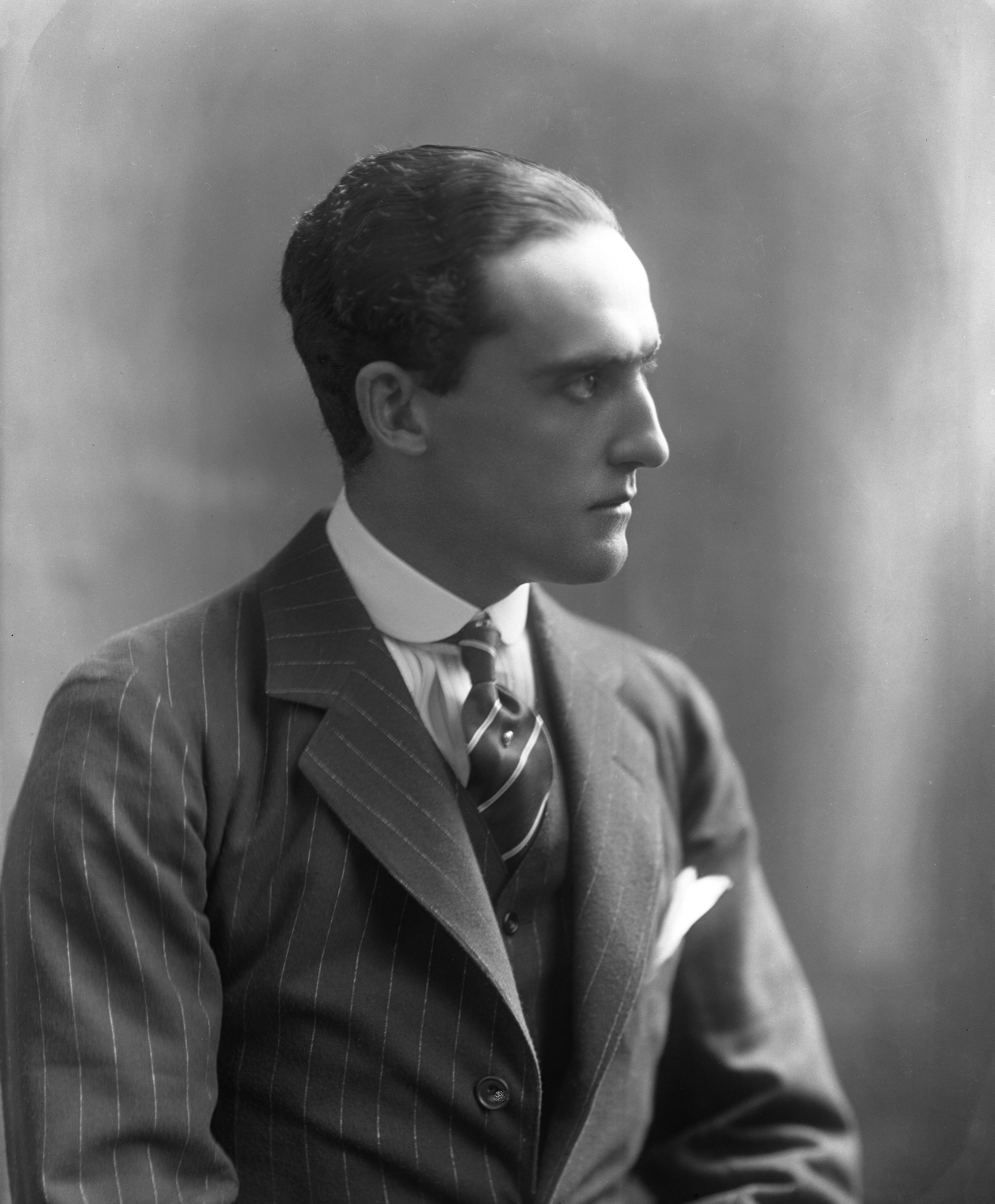

Member of Parliament (United Kingdom) for Taunton
- In office 1924–1935
- Preceded by: Sir John Hope Simpson
- Succeeded by: Edward Wickham

Personal details
- Born: 18 August 1882 Margate, Kent
- Died: 28 November 1958 (aged 76) Mont Saint-Hilaire, Quebec
- Resting place: Mont Saint-Hilaire, Quebec
- Party: Conservative Party (UK)
- Education: McGill University
- Awards: Distinguished Service Order; Order of St. Anne (Third Class with Swords); Ordre de Leopold; Mentioned in Despatches (four times)

Military service
- Allegiance: Canada
- Branch/service: Canadian Militia; Canadian Expeditionary Force; Canadian Army
- Years of service: 1900-20; 1939-42
- Rank: Lieutenant; Captain; Lieutenant-Colonel; Brigadier
- Unit: 2nd Canadian Mounted Rifles; 5th (Royal Highland Regiment) of Canada
- Commands: Princess Patricia's Canadian Light Infantry; 3rd Canadian Division Reinforcement Camp (CCRC)
- Battles/wars: Second Boer War: Battle of Hart's River; First World War: Second Battle of Ypres (WIA); Battle of Mont Sorrel (WIA); Second World War

Andrew Hamilton Gault DSO (18 August 1882 – 28 November 1958) was a Canadian Army officer and British politician. At his own expense, he raised the Princess Patricia's Canadian Light Infantry, the last privately raised regiment in the British Empire. Hatch Court in Somerset today once housed a small museum commemorating Gault's military career. From 1924 to 1935 he was the Conservative Member of Parliament for Taunton, Somerset. Returning to Quebec after World War II, Gault vigilantly defended his estate of Mont Saint-Hilaire from expropriation by mining interests and bequeathed it to McGill University to help ensure its preservation.

== Early life ==
Known as 'Hammie', Gault was born in England, the only son of a native of Strabane, Andrew Frederick Gault (1833–1903), of Rokeby in Montreal's Golden Square Mile; and his wife Louise Sarah Harman (1847–1937), daughter of Henry B. Harman, of Surrey. His middle name, which he used as his first, was for his paternal grandmother's family, the Hamiltons of Fintra House, near Killybegs, County Donegal. His uncles included the Hon. Matthew Hamilton Gault and Sir James Welsh Skelton, and when his father (the Cotton King of Canada) died in 1915, he, his mother and sister inherited just over $1.3 million each.

Gault was educated at Bishop's College School, Lennoxville, and afterwards at McGill University in preparation for taking science at Oxford University. Instead, he took the opportunity to be commissioned into the 2nd Canadian Mounted Rifles for service in the Second Boer War. He served with distinction in South Africa, fighting at the Battle of Hart's River, and was awarded the Queen's South Africa Medal and three clasps. Unsuccessful in his attempt to join a British Cavalry regiment, he returned to Montreal and served as a Captain with the 5th (Royal Highland Regiment) of Canada.

In Montreal, Gault took up his duty in business life there. He was appointed by His Majesty the King, Honorary Consul-General for Sweden in Canada, 1909–1911; and a member of the council for the Montreal Board of Trade, 1911–1913. Gault was a director of various companies connected to his family including Gault Brothers and Company (wholesale dry goods); Montreal Cotton Company; Van Allen Company; Trent Valley Woolen Company; Crescent Manufacturing Company; and Gault Brothers of Winnipeg and Vancouver.

Although successful, Gault took little interest in business, preferring physical adventure and the military life. He frequently went canoeing and fishing in northern Quebec; he participated in a five-month safari in Africa, shot mountain goats in the Rocky Mountains, and flew his biplane over Europe, northern Africa and the Middle East.

== Princess Patricia's Canadian Light Infantry ==
Insignia of Princess Patricia's Canadian Light Infantry as designed by Princess Patricia

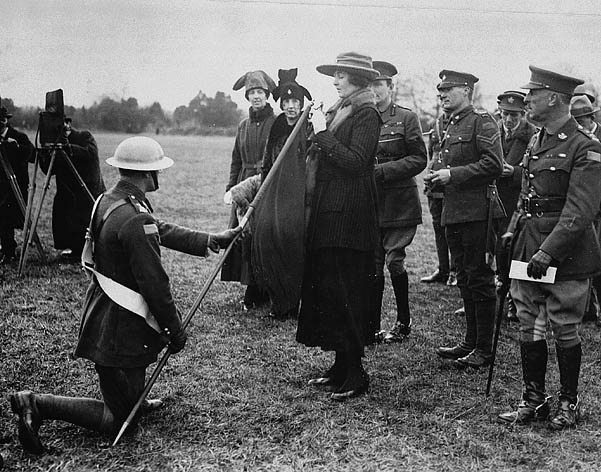
Princess Patricia inspecting the regimental flag in 1919

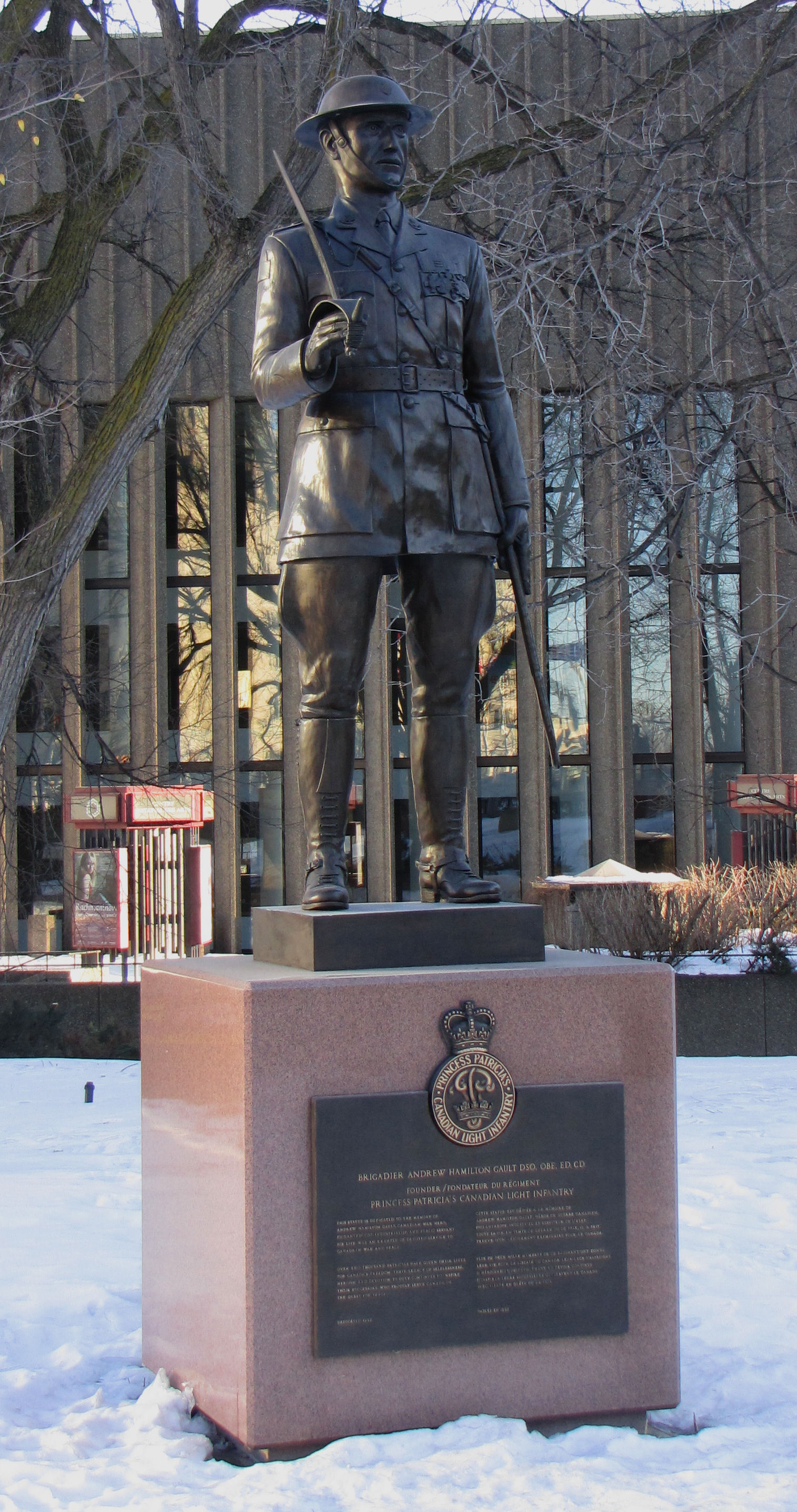
Statue of Brigadier Andrew Hamilton Gault in front of National Arts Centre in Ottawa, Ontario

Following the example set by fellow countryman Lord Strathcona, who raised Lord Strathcona's Horse (Royal Canadians), on the eve of the First World War Gault offered the Canadian government $100,000 to help raise and equip an infantry battalion for overseas duty. Lt.-Col. Francis Farquhar of the Coldstream Guards, military secretary to Canada's Governor-General, the Duke of Connaught, supported Gault's idea. Between them, they made the decision to recruit men who had already seen military action, but who were not attached to any militia units, in order to hasten the regiment's departure for Europe.

The Governor-General's daughter, Princess Patricia of Connaught, was known for her public appreciation of Canada's vast wilderness and its people. The Gaults had entertained the Connaughts during their visits to Montreal, and they had also been frequent guests at Rideau Hall. Colonel Farquhar approached the Duke of Connaught for permission to name the Regiment after his daughter. The request was made to the Princess, who was said to be delighted. On 10 August 1914, through a charter embodied in a report of the Committee of the Privy Council of Canada, Princess Patricia's Canadian Light Infantry came into being. Princess Patricia, the Colonel-in-Chief, designed and made by hand the regimental flag.

Captain Gault was promoted to Major and appointed second-in-Command of his regiment. He was first wounded at St. Eloi on 28 February 1915. He rejoined the battalion on 27 April 1915 shortly before Lt.-Col. Buller was wounded:

The leadership of Major Gault did much to strengthen the will and determination of the men. Lieutenant Hugh Niven remarked in hindsight: "With Hamilton Gault there, nobody could think of retiring... Nobody knows why, but it gave everyone a tremendous lot of courage that nobody else in the world could give to the other regiments".

Gault commanded the Patricia's during the first part of the Second Battle of Ypres. He was wounded in the morning but carried on until a second more serious injury compelled him to pass command on to Captain Adamson. When he rejoined in October 1915, he brought with him reinforcements from the University Companies. He was wounded for a third time and lost a leg at Sanctuary Wood during the Battle of Mont Sorrel, 2 June 1916.

Despite the loss of his left leg, Gault refused repatriation to Canada and returned to France where he was initially seconded as Aide-de-camp to Major General Victor Williams, the General Officer Commanding 3rd Canadian Division. Later Gault commanded the 3rd Canadian Division Reinforcement Camp (CCRC) with the local rank of lieutenant colonel. He was promoted to lieutenant colonel of his own regiment on 28 March 1918 but remained seconded with CCRC. Finally, he rejoined his regiment on 21 November 1918, and commanded the Patricia's until demobilization. He was awarded the Distinguished Service Order; the Russian Order of St. Anne (Third Class with Swords); the Belgian Ordre de Leopold and was four times Mentioned in Despatches. The citation for his DSO appeared in The London Gazette in April 1915 and reads as follows:

For conspicuous gallantry at St. Eloi on 27th February, 1915, in reconnoitring quite close to the enemy's position and obtaining information of great value for our attack which was carried out next day. On the 28th February Major Gault assisted in the rescue of the wounded under most difficult circumstances whilst exposed to heavy fire.

== Toll of war ==
By the end of August 1914, after ten days of recruiting, the Princess Patricia's Canadian Light Infantry was a regiment 1,098 strong; only fifty of these had not seen action in the Boer Wars or with the British Army. They were the first Canadian soldiers to arrive on French soil. Its first commanding officer, Lt.-Col. Francis Farquhar, who had been instrumental with Gault in organizing the regiment, was killed at St. Eloi (1915) in their first action. Gault became the third commanding officer, but as described had been wounded several times and lost his left leg. By 7 May 1915 the regiment numbered 635 men, but by the end of the following day they numbered just 150. Gault was one of only two of the regiment's officers to survive World War I, the other being Lt.-Colonel Agar Adamson, of Ottawa, who skillfully led the regiment at both Vimy Ridge and Passchendaele. Aside from Farquhar, Gault lost another close friend and fellow officer in Talbot Mercer Papineau, at the Battle of Passchendaele.

== British politics ==
Gault divorced his first wife in 1918. After retiring from the army in 1920, he stayed in England, moving to Hatch Court near Taunton, which he purchased from the aunt of his second wife, whom he 'quietly' married in 1922. His military record stood him in good stead when he stood for election, running for the Unionist Party (Conservative) in 1923. He lost to the Liberal candidate by a narrow margin of 1,255 votes. However, he returned the following year and was elected as the Member of Parliament for Taunton at the 1924 general election. He held the seat through two further elections until he retired from the House of Commons at the 1935 general election.

He was a progressive Conservative; in 1932 Taunton Town Council unanimously voted to present him with the freedom of the borough. Colonel and Mrs. Gault supported a number of progressive political and social movements.

== World War II ==
Recalled to active duty in the Second World War, he served on staff with the Canadian Army in England. He was promoted colonel in 1940 and brigadier in 1942, commanding a Canadian Army Reinforcement Holding Unit until ill health forced him to retire later that year. He returned to Canada and his Canadian home at Mont Saint-Hilaire in Quebec in 1944.

In 1947, Gault founded the Princess Patricia's Canadian Light Infantry Association and served as the first national president. He maintained his connection with the regiment and gave advice on regimental matters which were frequently referred to him. He was appointed honorary lieutenant-colonel in 1948 and visited the regiment in Calgary in 1953 and in Germany in 1954. He was appointed the first colonel of the regiment shortly before his death 28 November 1958.

In 1945, at the end of the war he returned to Quebec. Appointed honorary colonel (1948) and colonel (1958) of his regiment, he showed a keen interest in it until his death in 1958.

== Private life ==
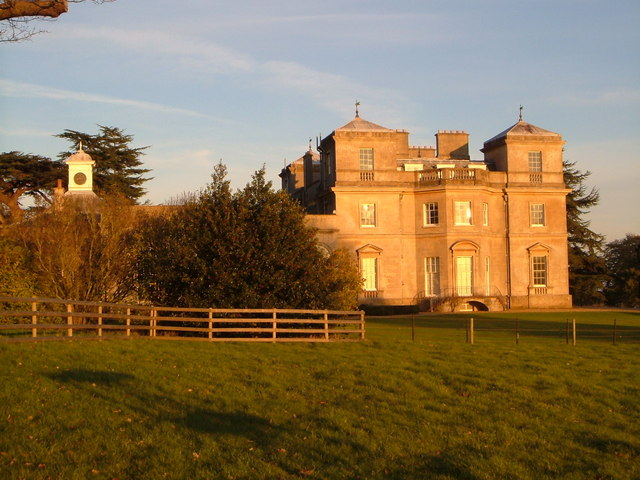
Hatch Court, the estate Gault purchased from his second wife's aunt; his home from 1922 to 1945

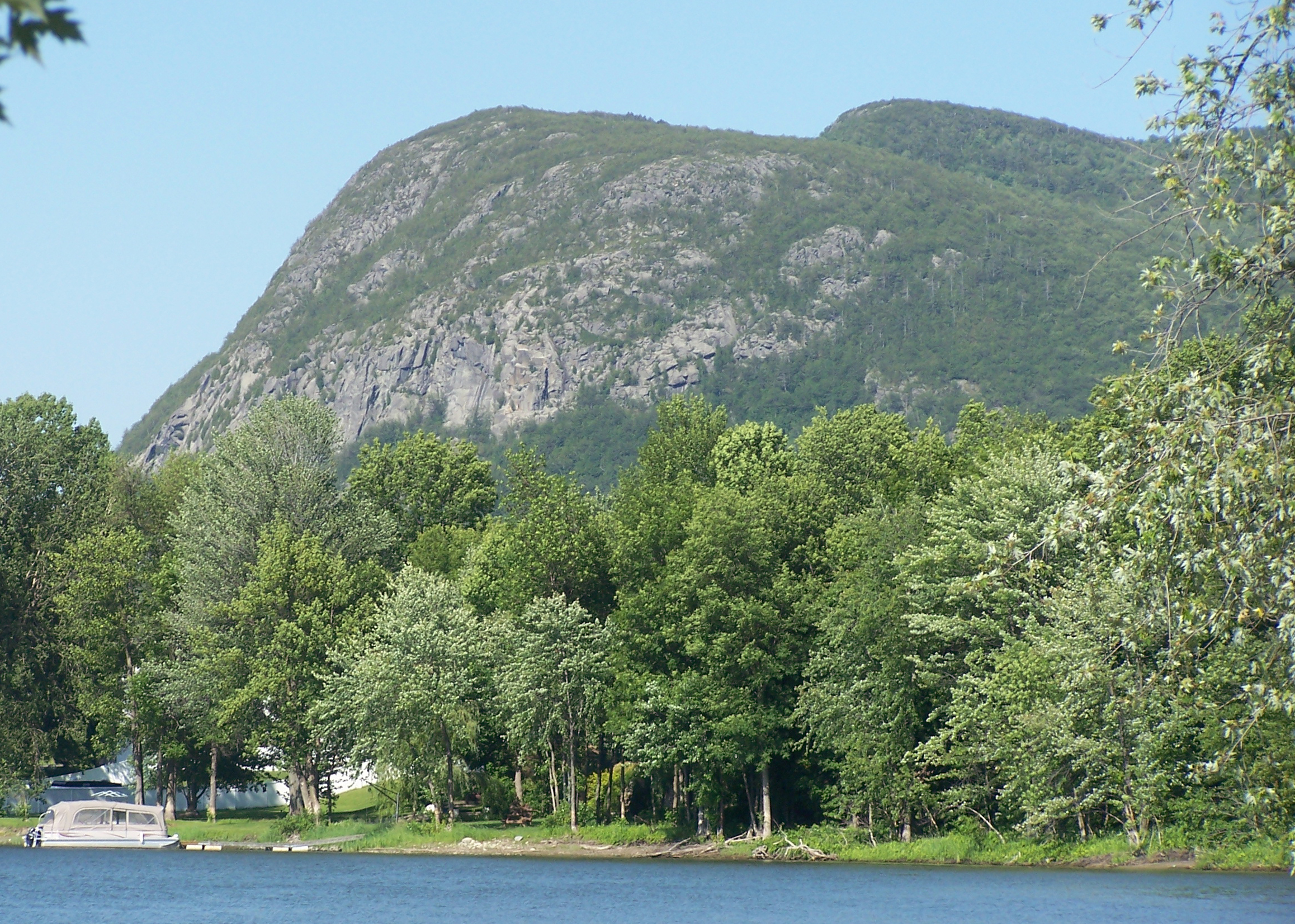
Gault's Canadian estate, Mont Saint-Hilaire (Dieppe and Rocky summits) seen from Otterburn Park

Gault purchased a biplane before the First World War. Both he and his second wife were enthusiastic aviators. Gault also introduced the daughter of his deceased fiancée, Patricia Blackader, to flying when he and his wife took her up in their Gypsy Moth in Lausanne. After flying over Paris with disregard for aviation rules, the three narrowly escaped arrest on their return to Le Bourget airport. In 1933, as part of a party that included Sir William Lindsay Everard, Amyas Eden Borton and Mr & Mrs Walter Leslie Runciman, they flew to Germany for a holiday, and were met by Adolf Hitler and Hermann Goering.

In Taunton he served on various committees and was involved in local politics. He was President of the Society of Somerset Folk and regularly gave a cup for the 'best fat beast' in the Taunton Christmas Show. The Orangery at Hatch Court served as a trophy room for all Gault's hunting trophies. Today, Hatch Court houses a museum commemorating Gault's military career. Retiring after the Second World War to Quebec where he had grown up, Gault returned to the 2,200 acre Mont Saint-Hilaire estate he had purchased in 1913 from Colin A. M. Campbell, of Manoir Rouville. He vigilantly protected the property from expropriation by mining interests. Upon his death, he bequeathed it to McGill University to help ensure its preservation.

== Marriages ==
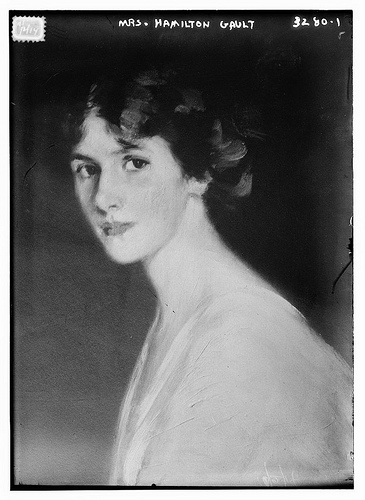
Mrs Marguerite (Stephens) Gault, c.1912

In 1904, after a brief romance, he married one of the heiresses to the Golden Square Mile in Montreal, Marguerite Claire Stephens (d.1935), daughter of The Hon. George Washington Stephens and his second wife Elizabeth McIntosh.

In 1918, Gault divorced his first wife over what he suspected was an affair with a young officer from his regiment while recovering from his wounds. Marguerite claimed it was a harmless flirtation and many who knew her well agreed. Gault was unsuccessful in his divorce proceedings before the Senate of Canada (the only recourse then open to Quebec residents). Their divorce was finally settled in the much more lenient French courts. Afterwards she was briefly married to Italian aviator Colonel Luigino Falchi.

In 1920 his new fiancée, Mrs Kathleen (Newberry) Blackader (widow of one of Gault's cousins and fellow officers in the Patricias, Captain Gordon Home Blackader, of Montreal) died when the car Gault was driving skidded and overturned. She was trapped underneath and he was unable to free her. Her daughter, Margaret Patricia Blackader (1913–2002), became his ward.

In 1922, he married Dorothy Blanche Shuckburgh, of Hatch Court, Somerset. She was the daughter of C. J. Shuckburgh, formerly of Hatch, and a granddaughter of the late R. H. Shuckburgh J.P., who in his lifetime lived at Bourton Hall, Warwickshire. She died at Hatch Court in 1972.

== Death and burial ==
Gault died at Mont Saint-Hilaire on 28 November 1958, without issue by either wife. Following a military funeral with full honours in Montreal, he was buried in England at his former home, Hatch Court. A bronze memorial plaque was placed in the floor of the south aisle of Hatch Beauchamp Church by his widow, part of the inscription on which is as follows: "1882-1958. Brigadier A. Hamilton Gault, D.S.O., E.D., C.N., of Hatch Court and Mount St. Hilaire, Canada. Founder of Princess Patricia's Canadian Light Infantry. Freeman of the Borough of Taunton."

== Arms ==
Coat of arms of Hamilton Gault

Crest
Issuant from a grassy mount Vert a perch proper thereon a hawk Argent beaked and belled Or holding in its beak a fleur-de-lis Argent.
Escutcheon
Azure on a perch issuant from the base proper a hawk close Argent beaked and belled Or, in chief three fleurs-de-lis Argent.
Motto
DEO GRATIAS

== See also ==
- List of Bishop's College School alumni
- Generals of World War II

Parliament of the United Kingdom
Preceded by John Hope Simpson	Member of Parliament for Taunton; 1924–1935	Succeeded by Edward Wickham
