= Alfred Welby =

British politician

Lieutenant-Colonel Sir Alfred Welby KBE JP
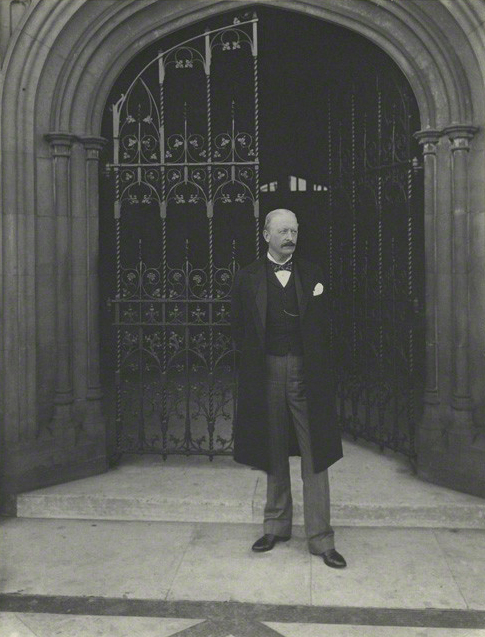
- Welby, photographed in 1897

Member of Parliament for Taunton
- In office 1895–1906
- Preceded by: Alfred Percy Allsopp
- Succeeded by: Sir Edward Boyle, Bt.

Personal details
- Born: 22 August 1849 Denton, Lincolnshire
- Died: 18 May 1937 (aged 87) Ascot, Berkshire
- Party: Conservative
- Education: Eton College

Lieutenant-Colonel Sir Alfred Cholmeley Earle Welby KBE JP (22 August 1849 – 18 May 1937) was a Conservative Party politician who served as the Member of Parliament (MP) for Taunton from 1895 until 1906. He had previously served in the British Army, rising to the rank of lieutenant-colonel in 1892. He stood unsuccessfully for the Conservatives in 1885, 1886 and 1892 prior to gaining his seat in Taunton. In 1906 he opted not to stand again in Taunton, but to contest the seat in East Finsbury, but was defeated. He was a London County Councillor from 1907 to 1910, and during the First World War, he was secretary of the Royal Patriotic Fund Corporation.

== Early and military life ==
Alfred Cholmeley Earle Welby was born on 22 August 1849 in Denton, Lincolnshire, the youngest son of Sir Glynne Welby, 3rd Baronet. He received his education at Eton College, and then entered the British Army in 1867, purchasing a commission in the 85th Regiment of Foot as an ensign. He shortly after transferred to the 56th Foot, and in 1870 purchased a promotion to lieutenant. The following year he transferred to the 90th Foot. He was promoted to captain in 1876, and transferred to the Royal Scots Greys later that year. He was raised to the rank of lieutenant colonel in 1892. In May 1896, he attended the coronation of Nicholas II of Russia, and two months later he retired from the army.

== Political career ==
While still serving in the army, Welby stood unsuccessfully for the Conservative Party in the 1885 general election, in his native constituency of Grantham, where his father had served as a Member of Parliament (MP). He subsequently lost two further elections in Poplar, London, in the general elections of 1886 and 1892. In 1895, he was finally elected, in the Conservative stronghold of Taunton, standing unopposed. The constituency was contested at the 1900 general election, in which he held his seat with a majority of 363 votes. In the 1906 election, he opted to stand in Finsbury East, a seat held by the Liberals, but despite a swing towards the Conservatives, he failed to win the seat. He was later elected onto the London County Council for the same area between 1907 and 1910, and then served as secretary of the Royal Patriotic Fund Corporation from 1914 to 1920. He died on 18 May 1937.

Parliament of the United Kingdom
Preceded by Alfred Percy Allsopp	Member of Parliament for Taunton; 1895–1906	Succeeded by Sir Edward Boyle, Bt
