= Alexander Charles Barclay =

English brewer and politician

Alexander Charles Barclay (1823 – 10 January 1893) was an English brewer and Liberal politician who sat in the House of Commons from 1865 to 1880.

Barclay was the son of David Barclay of Eastwick Park, Leatherhead and his wife Maria Dorothea Williamson, daughter of Sir Hedworth Williamson, 7th Baronet. His father was M.P. for Penryn and for Sunderland. He was educated at Harrow School and at Trinity College, Cambridge. Although he was admitted at the Inner Temple on 25 April 1850, he was not called to the bar. He was a member of the brewing firm of Barclay, Perkins and Co. He also owned race horses.

Barclay stood unsuccessfully for parliament at Taunton at a by-election in August 1859. At the 1865 general election Barclay was elected as a Member of Parliament (MP) for Taunton, and held the seat until he stood down at the 1880 general election.

Barclay lived at Scraptoft Hall, Leicestershire and died unmarried at the age of 69.

Parliament of the United Kingdom
Preceded by George Cavendish-Bentinck; Arthur Mills	Member of Parliament for Taunton; 1859–1880; With: Lord William Hay 1865–68; Edward William Cox 1868–74; Henry James from 1874	Succeeded by Sir William Palliser; Henry James
