= John Porter (portreeve) =

Member of the Parliament of England

John Porter was an English tax collector, portreeve for the town of Taunton in the West of England. He also served as one of the two Members of Parliament for the borough of Taunton in some parliaments of the late 14th century.

== Life and career ==
John Porter was first returned as a Member of Parliament for Taunton in January 1390, the 17th Parliament of Richard II. He was not returned in the next two parliaments, but was re-elected in 1393 and 1394, gaining election for the final time in the 21st Parliament of Richard II. He also served as a tax collector for Taunton in 1388, and as portreeve for Taunton in 1385–86, 1389–90 and 1394–95.
