= Edward Thomas Bainbridge =

British Whig politician and banker

Member of Parliament for Taunton
- In office 6 August 1830 – 11 February 1842 Serving with Henry Labouchere
- Preceded by: Henry Seymour; William Peachey
- Succeeded by: Henry Labouchere; Edward Colebrooke

Personal details
- Born: 13 December 1798
- Died: 30 September 1872 (aged 73)
- Party: Whig

Edward Thomas Bainbridge (13 December 1798 – 30 September 1872) was a British Whig politician, and banker.

== Family ==
Bainbridge was the son of Thomas Bainbridge of Bedford Row, Middlesex, and Croydon Lodge, Surrey, and Anne née Waters, daughter of Morgan Waters of Tyfig, Glamorganshire. He first married a Mary Anne, and then an Emily Sedley; with the latter he had four sons and two daughters.

== Banking career ==
Alongside his brother, Henry, Bainbridge was a partner in the London banking house formed as a mercantile firm by their father, Puget, Bainbridges and Company, which was based in St. Paul's Churchyard. In 1833, his business connections were described as "more extensive than any other gentleman with Irish commercial and banking houses". The bank was badly affected by the crash of 1866, resulting in Bainbridge having little personal wealth at the time of his death at Brighton in 1872.

== Member of Parliament ==
In 1830, he announced his candidature for Member of Parliament (MP) as a Whig for Taunton, promising to be an "active and independent member" to succeed the retiring Tory, Henry Seymour. He gave "moderate and cautious" support for reform, but exclaimed he was attached to the "existing institutions of these kingdoms" yet a "friend of liberal measures" and "cared not from what party they came". He added further that, while it was important to maintain "the national dignity and splendour", he was "anxious... to alleviate... the burdens of the people... especially of the manufacturing and commercial classes". Asked to detail his views precisely, he said he was opposed to "violent or sweeping measure[s]" as supported by Lord Blandford, and more inclined to Lord John Russell's views where they were "consonant to the principles which I have professed and intend to advocate". He set himself as committed to religious liberty and the gradual abolition of slavery.

Bainbridge's canvas was successful and he was returned for the seat in second place. At a celebratory dinner, he said would seek to attempt to emulate his Whig colleague, Henry Labouchere, 1st Baron Taunton, who he described as a "friend and advocate of civil and religious liberty and of parliamentary reform". While an election petition was submitted by the defeated Tory member, William Peachey, Bainbridge's election was confirmed by an independent inquiry.

Despite being listed by the Wellington–Peel ministry as among their "friends", in Parliament Bainbridge voted against them on the civil list. In terms of reform, he presented a petition from Tamworth constituents in favour, voted for the second reading of the Grey ministry's bill, and rejected Isaac Gascoyne's wrecking amendment. He also presented a petition from the residents of Taunton St. James for their inclusion in the borough.

At the 1831 general election, he again declared his support for reform, also describing the King as having "nobly helped us to throw off the yoke which the boroughmongers would impose on us", and praising the "patriotic and independent spirit" shown by "all classes of voters". He was again returned unopposed alongside Labouchere and then joined Brooks's Club in July of that year. In Parliament, he continued, generally, to support reform measures, although he voted against the disfranchisement of Saltash and reducing the number of members for county constituencies.

Outside of reform measures, he voted to reduce public salaries, for Lord Ebrington's confidence motion, and to punish those who had been found guilty of bribery at the election for Dublin. He also voted against ministers on the Russian-Dutch loan, and for an inquiry into the glove trade. In one speech in 1832, he criticised ministers for planning to recover money from Irish tithe-payers in order to pass it to the clergy, and warned legal action by the attorney-general to evict tenant farmers would leave "misery and desolation, where he found poverty and wretchedness".

Bainbridge was again returned for the seat at the 1832 general election and continued to hold the seat as a "reformer... in favour of the ballot" until he retired by accepting the office of Steward of the Chiltern Hundreds in 1842.

Parliament of the United Kingdom
Preceded by Henry Seymour; William Peachey	Member of Parliament for Taunton; 1830–1842; With: Henry Labouchere	Succeeded by Henry Labouchere; Edward Colebrooke
