= Jackie Ballard =

British politician (born 1953)

Member of Parliament for Taunton
- In office 1 May 1997 – 14 May 2001
- Preceded by: David Nicholson
- Succeeded by: Adrian Flook

Personal details
- Born: Jacqueline Margaret Mackenzie; 4 January 1953 (age 73) Dunoon, Scotland
- Party: Liberal Democrat
- Spouse: Derek Ballard
- Education: Monmouth School for Girls
- Alma mater: London School of Economics

Jacqueline Margaret Ballard (née Mackenzie; born 4 January 1953) has been a charity senior manager, politician and journalist in the United Kingdom. She served as Liberal Democrat MP for Taunton from 1997 to 2001.

Her former roles include Director General of the RSPCA, Chief Executive of RNID and Chief Executive of Womankind Worldwide.

== Early career ==
Jacqueline Margaret Mackenzie was born in Dunoon, Scotland. Her family moved, when she was 10, to South Wales, where she studied at Haberdashers' Monmouth School for Girls. She then read social psychology at the London School of Economics. She was recruited into the then Liberal Party by Paddy Ashdown and was elected a Councillor for both the South Somerset District Council (1987–1991) and Somerset County Council (1993–1997). She stood as the Liberal Democrat parliamentary candidate in Taunton in the 1992 general election, coming second, before winning the seat in 1997.

== MP for Taunton ==
Ballard was elected the Liberal Democrat Member of Parliament for Taunton in Somerset, at the 1997 general election, unseating the incumbent MP David Nicholson (Conservative) by 2,443 votes and a swing of 4.6%. She was the first Liberal MP for Taunton since the 1922 general election.

During her time as an MP, Ballard was a vocal and prominent campaigner against blood sports, in particular fox and stag hunting. Ballard came under considerable pressure due to her stance, once having to receive police protection during a constituency surgery which was lobbied by hunt supporters. It has been suggested that her work with regards to this ban contributed to her losing her seat, which prepared the way for her role as CEO of the RSPCA.

In Parliament, she was spokesperson on Women's Issues and on Local Government from 1997 to 1999, and from 1999 to 2001, was Deputy Home Affairs Spokesman. She was also co-sponsor of the first bill which attempted to ban fox hunting, which is widely seen as an important factor in her defeat at the 2001 election. She stood for the post of leader of the Liberal Democrats in 1999, but was defeated by Charles Kennedy, and came fourth out of five candidates. She lost her seat at the 2001 general election by 235 votes, to the Conservative candidate Adrian Flook.

== Iran ==
After losing her seat in 2001, Ballard spent some time studying in Iran.

"I was lucky enough to have £25,000 redundancy money and no dependants and I realised that for the first time in my life, at the age of 48, I was free. I am divorced, my daughter had just graduated and started work and my mother, although not always in the best of health, did not need me to look after her. I decided to combine two of my passions and to pursue something completely different....I am now on my fifth visit to the country [Iran], researching and writing my thesis while learning the language, Farsi (referring to Persian)."

She wrote about her experience of the chador as a western woman in Iran.

"I wonder how the media might have treated Ann Widdecombe or Blair's so called 'babes' if all women MPs here wore the uniform of the chador. Perhaps then the women in Parliament would be taken more seriously as professional politicians doing a job, not as fat or thin women in grey or pink suits. Maybe then I would not have been described by some witty journalist as having 'a good face for radio' or be told by the late Auberon Waugh that I was 'too fat to be an MP'."

== Career after Westminster ==
In September 2002, she was appointed Director General of the RSPCA. To solve the financial problems the RSPCA was facing, she made substantial changes including 300 job cuts. By 2004 the RSPCA had balanced its books and made £7 million savings.

Ballard was appointed Chief Executive of the RNID in October 2007. She was appointed as the Chief Executive of Womankind Worldwide in September 2012 but stepped down from the role after only ten months in June 2013.

In December 2009, Ballard was appointed to the Independent Parliamentary Standards Authority which supervises MPs' expenses. She was one of four members of IPSA who announced in December 2012 that they would not seek reappointment, citing disputes with speaker John Bercow.

She was interviewed in 2014 as part of The History of Parliament's oral history project.

== Personal life ==
She was married to Derek Ballard from 1975 to 1989. She has one daughter.

Parliament of the United Kingdom
Preceded by David Nicholson	Member of Parliament for Taunton; 1997–2001	Succeeded by Adrian Flook
