= Lewis Pope =

Lewis Pope (died 1623) was an English merchant and politician who sat in the House of Commons from 1621 to 1622.

Pope was a merchant of Taunton in 1605 when named on a charter of the Spanish Company. In 1620, he was elected Member of Parliament for Taunton.

Pope died between June and December 1623.

Pope married firstly Eleanor Saunders daughter of Christopher Saunders of Taunton, but she died in 1595 and was buried in the church of St Mary Magdalene. His second wife had a son called Thomas Moore.

Parliament of England
Preceded by James Clerke; John Dunn	Member of Parliament for Taunton; 1621–1622; With: Thomas Brereton	Succeeded by Thomas Brereton; Roger Prowse
