= Henry Seymour (Knoyle) =

British Tory politician (1776–1849)

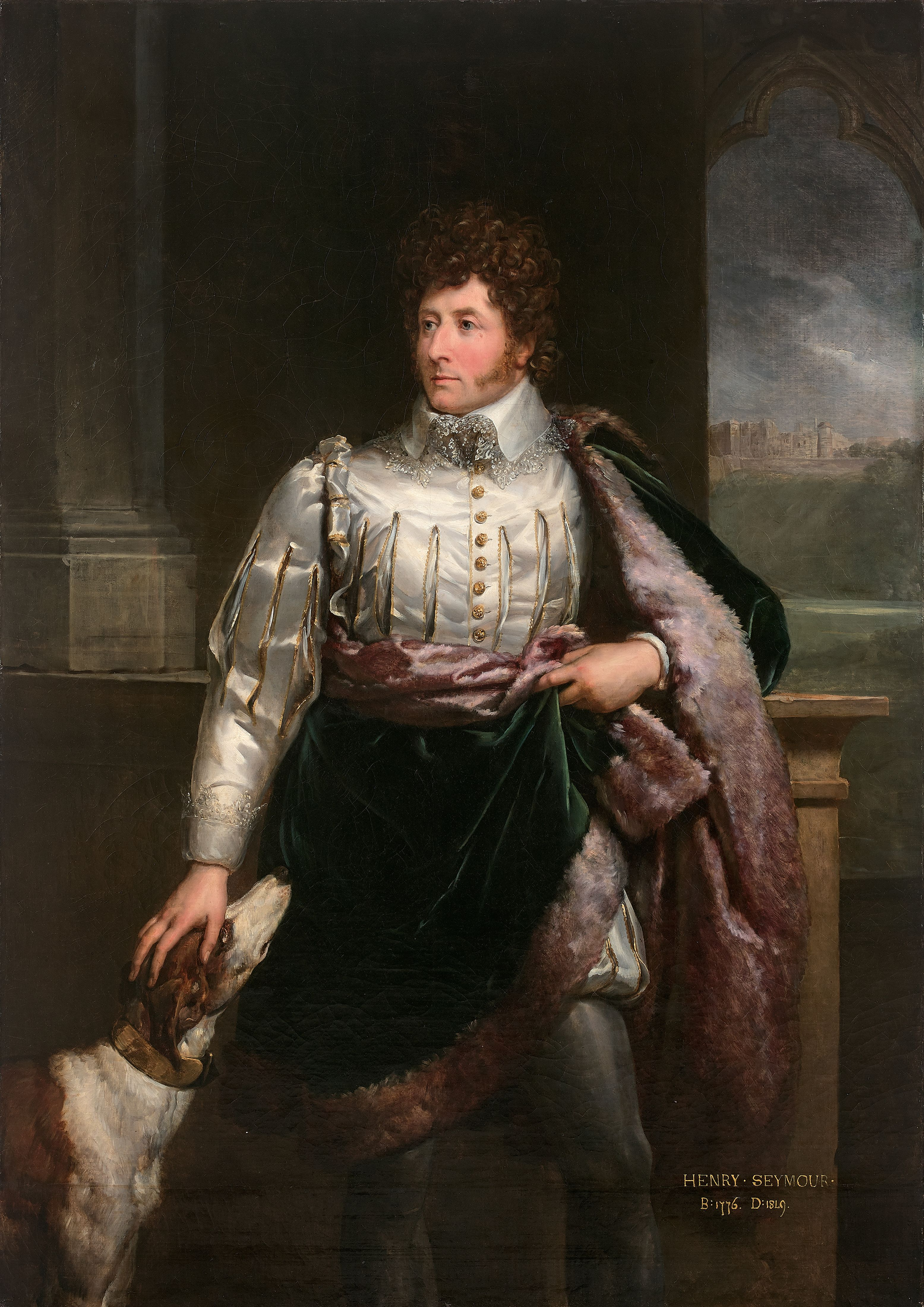
Portrait of Henry Seymour in an historical costume, 1815, by François Gérard

Henry Seymour MP, JP (10 November 1776 – 27 November 1849), of Knoyle House, East Knoyle, Wiltshire, of Trent, and of Northbrook, was a British Tory politician.

He was the only son of Henry Seymour, of Redland Court, Gloucestershire and his second wife, the Comtesse de Panthou.

He was elected as a Member of Parliament (MP) for the borough of Taunton at the 1826 general election, having contested the borough unsuccessfully in 1820, and held the seat until he stood down at the 1830 general election. He was also a Justice of the Peace (JP).

== Family ==
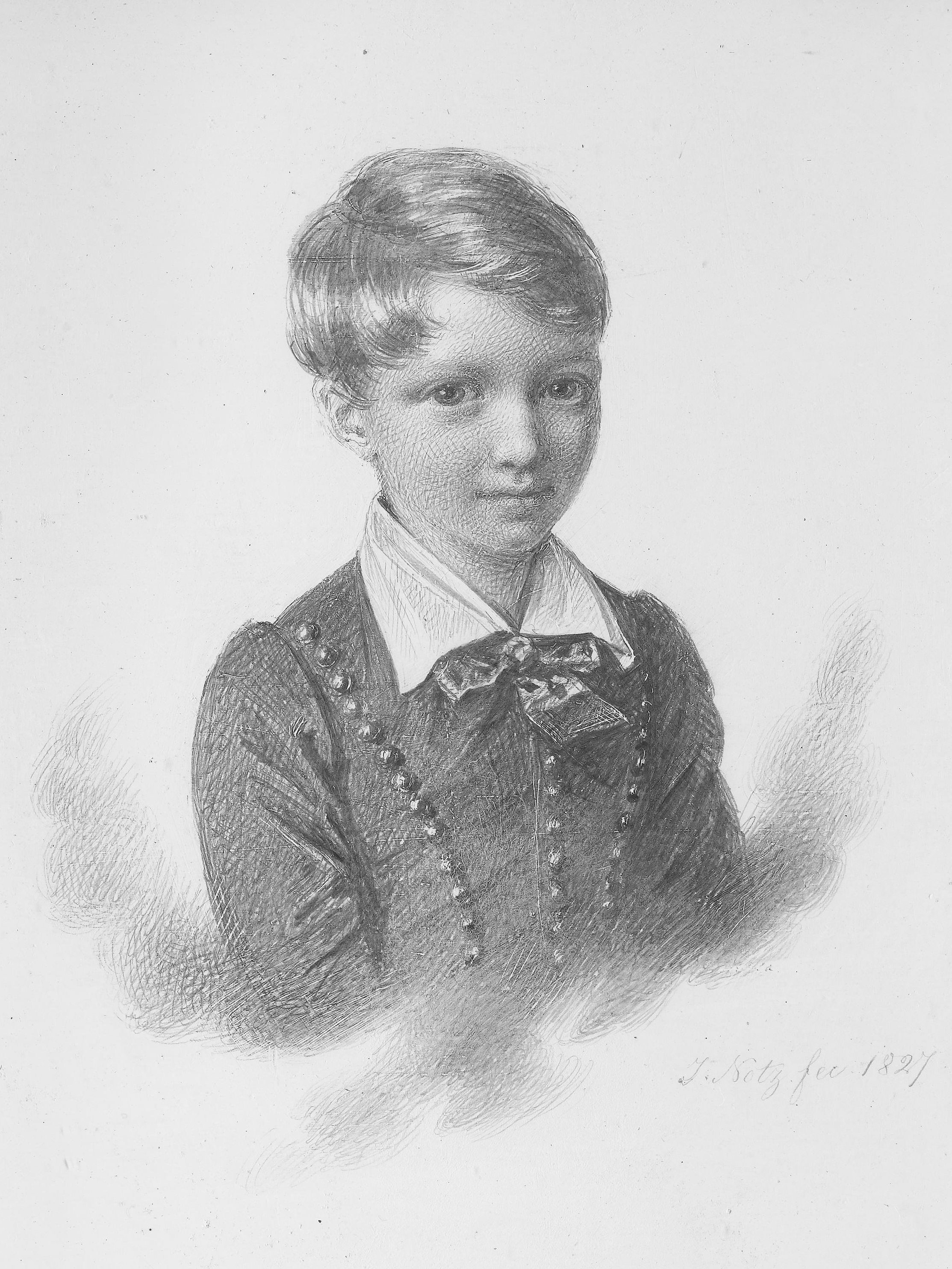
Henry Danby Seymour (Johannes Notz, 1827)

He married on 12 June 1817 Jane Hopkinson (d. 14 March 1869), daughter of Benjamin Hopkinson, of Bath and of Blagdon Court, Somerset. They had five children:

- Henry Danby Seymour, of Trent (1820–1877)
- Alfred Seymour, of Knoyle House, Wiltshire, and of Trent (1824–1888)
- Jane Seymour (d. 18 September 1892), m. 21 August 1847 Philip Pleydell-Bouverie, of Brymore (21 April 1821 – 10 March 1890), son of Hon. Philip Pleydell-Bouverie, and had issue
- Sarah Ellen Seymour (d. 14 August 1867), m. 14 May 1857 William Ayshford Sanford, of Nynehead Court, Somerset (2 December 1818 – 28 October 1902)
- Louisa Caroline Harcourt Seymour (d. 31 October 1889), m. 2 September 1862 Maj.-Gen. Sir Creswicke Henry Rawlinson, 1st Baronet (11 April 1810 – 5 March 1895), by whom she had two sons

With Félicité Dailly-Brimont he had an illegitimate daughter Henriette Félicité (1803–1868) who married Sir James Tichborne, 10th Baronet, father of Roger Charles Tichborne, the heir who was lost at sea in 1854 and whose impersonator, Arthur Orton, was 'The Tichborne Claimant' in the famous trial. Félicité Dailly-Brimont was reputed to have been the illegitimate daughter of the Duc de Bourbon Conti and his mistress Marie Claude Gaucher-Dailly.

Parliament of the United Kingdom
Preceded by Alexander Baring; John Ashley Warre	Member of Parliament for Taunton; 1826–1830; With: William Peachey	Succeeded by Henry Labouchere; Edward Thomas Bainbridge
