= Sir Edward Boyle, 1st Baronet =

Member of the British Parliament for Taunton
- In office 1906–1909

Personal details
- Born: 6 September 1848
- Died: 19 March 1909

Sir Edward Gurney Boyle, 1st Baronet KC (6 September 1848 – 19 March 1909) was a Conservative Party politician in the United Kingdom.

He was elected at the 1906 general election as Member of Parliament for Taunton, but died three years later, aged 60 a month after he had resigned his seat.

He had been made a baronet in 1904.

== Early life ==
Boyle was born in Kensington, London on 6 September 1848 the son of Edward Boyle and Constance (née Knight). He first became architect and was a Fellow of the Surveyor's Institute. With a change of career he was called to the bar in 1887 as a barrister. He later became a King's Counsel.

== Politics ==
In 1900 he stood as a Conservative candidate for Hastings in the 1900 General Election, he lost to the liberal candidate. He stood again in 1903 in Rye at a by-election, he again lost to the Liberal candidate. In the 1906 General Election he stood as a candidate at Taunton where he was elected as the Member of Parliament for Taunton. He resigned his seat on 11 February 1909 due to ill health and was appointed a Steward of the Manor of Northstead.

== Marriage & children ==
Boyle married Constance Jane Knight on 18 March 1874. They had a son and daughter:

- Sir Edward Boyle, 2nd Baronet (born 12 June 1878, died 31 March 1945)
- Constance Beryl Bertha Boyle (born 31 March 1882, died 8 February 1965)

Boyle died on 19 March 1909 at his house at Queens Gate, Kensington, London aged 60 and was buried in an unmarked vault on the west side of Highgate Cemetery. He was succeeded in the baronetcy by his son.

== Notes ==
Parliament of the United Kingdom
Preceded by Alfred Welby	Member of Parliament for Taunton; 1906–1909	Succeeded by William Wellesley Peel
Baronetage of the United Kingdom
New creation	Baronet (of Ockham); 1904–1909	Succeeded by Edward Boyle
