= Thomas Bacot =

English politician

Thomas Bacot (died c. 1412) was an English politician. He sat as MP for Taunton in 1410 and bailiff of the Bishop of Winchester's liberty of Taunton from 1387 till his death.

Before 1393, he married Ellen (died 1419) and had one son and one daughter.
