= 1921 Taunton by-election =

UK Parliamentary by-election

← 1918	8 April 1921	1922 →
Candidate	Griffith-Boscawen	Lunnon
Party	Unionist	Labour
Popular vote	12,994	8,290
Percentage	61.1%	38.9%
MP before election
Boles
Unionist
Subsequent MP
Simpson
Liberal

The 1921 Taunton by-election was held on 8 April 1921. The by-election was held due to the resignation of the incumbent Coalition Unionist MP, Dennis Fortescue Boles. It was won by the Coalition Unionist candidate Arthur Griffith-Boscawen.

Taunton by-election, 1921
Party		Candidate	Votes	%	±%
C	Unionist	Arthur Griffith-Boscawen	12,994	61.1	−11.3
	Labour	James Lunnon	8,290	38.9	+11.3
Majority			4,704	22.2	−22.6
Turnout			21,284	73.5	+13.1
	Unionist hold		Swing	-11.3	
C indicates candidate endorsed by the coalition government.
