= William Damarle =

English politician

William Damarle (fl. 1373 – 1415) was an English politician. He sat as MP for Taunton in September 1388.

He also served as tax collector of Somerset in May and December 1384.

He married Joan and had one son.
