= William Peel, 1st Earl Peel =

British politician, chair of the Peel Commission

The Right Honourable The Earl Peel GCSI GBE TD PC DL
- Peel in 1910

Lord Keeper of the Privy Seal
- In office 3 September 1931 – 5 November 1931
- Monarch: George V
- Prime Minister: Ramsay MacDonald
- Preceded by: Tom Johnston
- Succeeded by: The Viscount Snowden

Secretary of State for India
- In office 18 October 1928 – 4 June 1929
- Monarch: George V
- Prime Minister: Stanley Baldwin
- Preceded by: The Earl of Birkenhead
- Succeeded by: William Wedgwood Benn
- In office 19 March 1922 – 22 January 1924
- Monarch: George V
- Prime Minister: David Lloyd George; Bonar Law; Stanley Baldwin
- Preceded by: Edwin Montagu
- Succeeded by: The Lord Olivier

First Commissioner of Works
- In office 10 November 1924 – 18 October 1928
- Monarch: George V
- Prime Minister: Stanley Baldwin
- Preceded by: Fred Jowett
- Succeeded by: The Marquess of Londonderry

Minister of Transport
- In office 7 November 1921 – 12 April 1922
- Monarch: George V
- Prime Minister: David Lloyd George
- Preceded by: Eric Geddes
- Succeeded by: The Earl of Crawford

Chancellor of the Duchy of Lancaster
- In office 1 April 1921 – 19 March 1922
- Monarch: George V
- Prime Minister: David Lloyd George
- Preceded by: The Earl of Crawford
- Succeeded by: William Sutherland

Parliamentary Under-Secretary of State for War
- In office 10 January 1919 – 1 April 1921
- Monarch: George V
- Prime Minister: David Lloyd George
- Preceded by: Ian Macpherson
- Succeeded by: Robert Sanders

Parliamentary Secretary to the Ministry of National Service
- In office 15 April 1918 – 10 January 1919
- Monarch: George V
- Prime Minister: David Lloyd George
- Preceded by: Cecil Beck
- Succeeded by: Position abolished

Member of the House of Lords Lord Temporal
- In office 24 October 1912 – 28 September 1937 as a hereditary peer
- Preceded by: The 1st Viscount Peel
- Succeeded by: The 2nd Earl Peel

Member of Parliament for Taunton
- In office 23 February 1909 – 24 October 1912
- Preceded by: Sir Edward Boyle
- Succeeded by: Gilbert Wills

Member of Parliament for Manchester South
- In office 29 May 1900 – 8 February 1906
- Preceded by: John Campbell
- Succeeded by: Arthur Haworth

Personal details
- Born: 7 January 1867 London
- Died: 28 September 1937 (aged 70) East Meon, near Petersfield, Hampshire
- Party: Liberal Unionist; Conservative
- Spouse: Hon. Eleanor Williamson
- Children: Doris; Arthur
- Parent: Arthur Peel, 1st Viscount Peel (father)
- Education: Balliol College, Oxford

William Robert Wellesley Peel, 1st Earl Peel (7 January 1867 – 28 September 1937), styled 2nd Viscount Peel from 1912 to 1929, was a British politician who was a local councillor, a Member of Parliament and a member of the House of Lords. After an early career as a barrister and a journalist, he entered first local and then national politics. He rose to hold a number of ministerial positions but is probably best remembered for chairing the Peel Commission in 1936–1937, which recommended for the first time the partition of the British Mandate of Palestine into separate Jewish and Arab states.

The grandson of a Conservative prime minister, he was unusual even for his period in the number of political parties for which he was elected. He began as a member of the Moderate Party on the London County Council and later became the leader of the renamed Municipal Reform Party; he was then elected as an MP for the Liberal Unionists and then for the Conservative Party before he inherited his seat in the Lords in 1912. He also served as a minister in governments led by Liberal, Conservative and Labour prime ministers.

His ministerial career began as Under-Secretary of State for War in 1919, and he entered the cabinet in 1922 as Secretary of State for India and held a number of other ministerial positions.

== Early life and career ==
The eldest son of Arthur Peel, 1st Viscount Peel, and Adelaide Dugdale, William Peel was born in London in 1867. His father was the fifth and youngest son of Prime Minister Sir Robert Peel.

Peel was educated at Harrow and Balliol College, Oxford, where he was secretary of the Oxford Union.

In 1893, he was called to the bar at the Inner Temple and practised as a barrister before taking the position of special correspondent for the Daily Telegraph during the Greco-Turkish War of 1897.

He was a Liveryman of the Spectacle Makers' Company, becoming it's Master in 1908.

== Political career ==
In 1900, Peel was appointed a member of the Royal Commission that was formed to inquire into the operation of the Port of London. In February the same year, he began his political career when he was elected in a by-election to fill a vacant seat for Woolwich in the London County Council to which he was re-elected in the ordinary election the following year. He was a member of the Moderate pro-Conservative grouping on the council that became the Municipal Reform Party. He was leader of the party from 1908 to 1910 and chairman of the county council from 1914 to 1916.

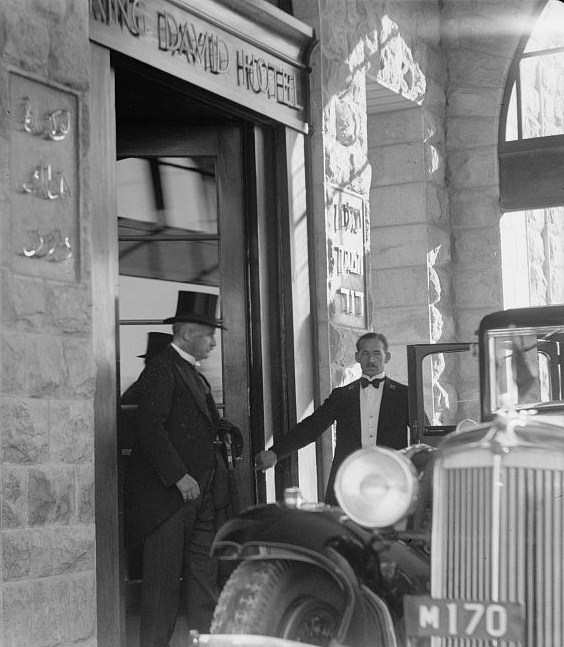
Lord Peel at the entrance of the King David Hotel, 1936.

He began his parliamentary career when he was elected as Liberal Unionist MP for Manchester South at the 1900 Manchester South by-election. At the next general election in 1906, he stood unsuccessfully at Harrow. He returned to the Commons in 1909, when he was elected as Conservative MP for Taunton at a by-election. He inherited his father's viscountcy in 1912 and so moved to the House of Lords.

Peel was appointed a deputy lieutenant of Bedfordshire and lieutenant-colonel of the Bedfordshire Yeomanry in 1912 and, at the outbreak of the First World War moved to France with his regiment, but ill health made him return to Britain in 1915. In 1918, he received his first government post as Joint Parliamentary Secretary at the Department of National Service in the coalition government of David Lloyd George. In 1919, Peel became Under-Secretary of State for War and a member of the Privy Council. Two years later, he became Chancellor of the Duchy of Lancaster and Minister for Transport.

In 1919 he was appointed Knight Grand Cross of the Order of the British Empire for his services as Chairman of Panel, Military Service (Government Departments) Committee; Chairman of Disabled Sailors' and Soldiers' 'Compensation Committee; formerly Chairman of the Committee on Detention of Neutral Vessels and of the Black List Committee.

He entered the cabinet in 1922 as Secretary of State for India, and, after the downfall of Lloyd George's coalition, continued to hold the post during the premierships of Andrew Bonar Law and Stanley Baldwin. The latter's government fell in January 1924, but after a brief spell in opposition, it was returned to power at the 1924 general election. Peel was appointed First Commissioner of Works in the Conservative administration formed by Baldwin. In 1928, Peel briefly returned to the India Office, but the Conservatives lost power by the 1929 general election.

In 1929, Peel was created Viscount Clanfield, of Clanfield in the County of Southampton, and Earl Peel in that year's Dissolution Honours. When a Conservative-dominated National Government was formed after the 1931 election, he became Lord Privy Seal but held that office for only two months and left government in November.

In January 1932 he was appointed Knight Grand Commander of the Order of the Star of India and that same year served as chairman of the Wheat Commission, and in 1934, he chaired the Royal Commission on the Common Law. In 1936–1937, he chaired the Peel Commission, which recommended for the first time the partition of the British Mandate of Palestine into separate Jewish and Arab states.

== Family ==
Peel married in 1899 the Honourable Eleanor Williamson (1871–1949), daughter of James Williamson, 1st Baron Ashton. They had two children:

- Lady Doris Peel (1900–1983), who married in 1927 Colonel Stewart Blacker (1887–1964), and had four children. She was a Justice of the Peace for the County of London in 1939, and for Sussex in 1948.
- Arthur Peel, 2nd Earl Peel (1901–1969)

In 1929, Ashton died, and Peel succeeded him as chairman of James Williamson and Company. He was a director of Barclays Bank and of the Great Northern Railway.

== Death ==
Lord Peel died at 70 in his home in East Meon, near Petersfield, Hampshire, in 1937 after a long illness. He was succeeded in his titles by his son, Arthur.

Parliament of the United Kingdom
Preceded by The Marquess of Lorne	Member of Parliament for Manchester South; 1900–1906	Succeeded by Arthur Haworth
Preceded by Sir Edward Boyle, Bt	Member of Parliament for Taunton; 1909–1912	Succeeded by Sir Gilbert Wills, Bt
Political offices
Preceded by Cyril Cobb	Chairman of the London County Council; 1914–1915	Succeeded by Cyril Jackson
Preceded by The Earl of Crawford	Chancellor of the Duchy of Lancaster; 1921–1922	Succeeded by Sir William Sutherland
Preceded by Eric Campbell Geddes	Minister of Transport; 1921–1922	Succeeded by The Earl of Crawford
Preceded by Edwin Montagu	Secretary of State for India; 1922–1924	Succeeded by The Lord Olivier
Preceded by Frederick William Jowett	First Commissioner of Works; 1924–1928	Succeeded by The Marquess of Londonderry
Preceded by The Earl of Birkenhead	Secretary of State for India; 1928–1929	Succeeded by William Wedgwood Benn
Preceded by Thomas Johnston	Lord Privy Seal; 1931	Succeeded by The Lord Snowden
Peerage of the United Kingdom
New creation	Earl Peel; 1929–1937	Succeeded by Arthur Peel
Preceded by Arthur Peel	Viscount Peel; 1912–1937; Member of the House of Lords (1912–1937)	Succeeded by Arthur Peel
