= William Marchaunt =

English politician

William Marchaunt was an English politician who served as the Member of Parliament for Taunton in various parliaments during the late 14th and early 15th centuries. He was a significant businessman in Taunton, and also served as a tax collector in the town.

== Life and career ==
William Marchaunt was first returned as a Member of Parliament for Taunton in 1379, the 3rd Parliament of Richard II. He was returned on and off twelve times in total, spanning over 20 years, gaining election for the final time in 1395, to the 22nd Parliament of Richard II. He married Agnes, and had at least two sons, Richard and John, who both later served as the Members of Parliament for Taunton.

Marchaunt served as a tax collector in Taunton in 1377 and 1383, and the last record of him came in November 1400, when he served as a juror in Taunton.
