= James Lunnon =

British-American artist (1897–1954)

- Born: October 3, 1897; Chesterton, Cambridgeshire, England
- Died: November 27, 1954 (aged 57); Coral Gables, Florida
- Resting place: Oakwood Cemetery (Montgomery, Alabama)
- Known for: portraiture
- Notable work: Fiorello La Guardia, Will Rogers, Charles Lindbergh
- Spouse: Martha Elizabeth "Betty" Sheehan White

James Lunnon (October 3, 1897 – November 27, 1954) was a British-born, American-based artist and engineer during the first half of the twentieth century. He was known primarily for his portraits of the wealthy and famous, including such notables as Mayor Fiorello La Guardia, Frank Buck, and Will Rogers.

== Early life ==
James Lunnon was born in Chesterton, Cambridgeshire, England on October 3, 1897. His father, James, was a miller later active in Labour politics, while his mother was a concert violinist and painter. For about three years he attended Malvern Public School in Worcestershire, England, before taking an apprenticeship at Rolls-Royce in London. He attended art classes at the Slade School of Art during the evenings while working at Rolls-Royce. In the late spring and summer, 1914, he moved to Paris and studied art at the Academie Julien.

== World War I ==
On August 4 at the start of the war, Lunnon returned to England. When he turned 16, he falsified his age and joined the Royal Marine Artillery, working with Rolls-Royce armored cars and other weapons in Belgium and France. In 1917 he learned to fly and was commissioned in the Royal Naval Air Force, which joined with the Royal Flying Corps to become the Royal Air Force in 1918. He flew bombing missions over France as a flight lieutenant. (Note: The maps of northern France he used are in possession of his family)

== The War’s Aftermath ==
Upon discharge he rejoined Rolls-Royce as a tester. Having observed the horrors of war, he became a devout Quaker. During the period 1919-1920 he set up and operated vehicle maintenance depots in Warsaw and Vienna as a member of the Joint British and American Friends Relief Mission. Lunnon caught typhus and had to return to England. After recovery he took up auto racing, serving as second man to Malcolm (later Sir Malcolm) Campbell. He continued with Rolls-Royce as final production tester and dynamometer specialist at Derby, England.

== North America ==
In 1923 Lunnon moved to Montreal, Canada, operating the maintenance department for Rolls-Royce Canada. He was sent from there to the Rolls-Royce production plant Springfield, Massachusetts in 1927 and moved from there to the Brewster-Rolls-Royce plant on Long Island, New York in 1929. In 1931 the Depression caused a downsizing at Rolls-Royce and Lunnon decided to take up painting again. He studied with Wayman Elbridge Adams and the Art Students League in Manhattan.

== Portraiture Artist in New York and France ==
In late 1931 he established a studio at the Rodin Studios, 200 West 57th Street, and over the next five years painted many notables in New York City. The list includes Will Rogers, Fiorello La Guardia, Frank Buck, Lincoln Ellsworth, Jimmy Doolittle, Richard E. Byrd, Eddie Rickenbacker, and Charles Lindbergh. His portraits were hung in Gracie Mansion and the Mitchel Field (Long Island) Officer’s Club and exhibited in many shows. The Will Rogers portrait was exhibited at the Corcoran in 1937. During that year he took six months off in France, painting primarily in Brittany. He also exhibited in Paris and while there, visited the Exposition Internationale des Arts et Techniques dans la Vie Moderne.

== Miami ==
In 1938 Lunnon accepted an offer from Max Fleischer, the creator of Betty Boop and the Popeye cartoons, to head up his color laboratory. While there he developed the chemicals used for color cartoon cells. He met Elizabeth Sheehan White in Miami and they were married in 1939. He also continued his portraiture, painting Miami notables as well as a series on the Miccosukee tribe that included Buffalo Tiger, a young man who later became their political leader. Based on his depictions of the Miccosukee, in 1940 he was included on a Works Progress Administration list of notable artists of Social Realism. His daughter Penelope Anne was born in 1942.

== World War II and Brazil ==
Also in 1942 Lunnon joined Embry-Riddle Aviation of Miami as chief engineer. While there he designed and built the Lunnon Trainer for pilots to learn instrument flying. In 1943 he was sent to São Paulo as chief engineer to Embry-Riddle Aviation’s effort to support the establishment and expansion of the Brazilian Air Force, the Escola Technica. While in Brazil he participated in the aerial mapping of the Amazon and, in his spare time, completed more portraits.

== Miami ==
In 1948 the family returned to Miami, where Lunnon devoted himself to portraits and to teaching portraiture. His studio was at 800 Douglas Entrance, Coral Gables. His portrait “The Adventurer” won a Latin American-wide competition to be included in Havana’s new Museum of Art. Unfortunately, in 1954 Lunnon died of a heart attack in his studio. He is buried with his wife in the Qakwood Cemetery, Montgomery, Alabama.
