= Taunton (constituency) =

Parliamentary constituency in the United Kingdom, 1885–2010

- Former county constituency for the House of Commons
- Boundary of Taunton in Somerset for the 1997–2010 general election

- Location of Somerset within England
- County: Somerset
- Major settlements: Taunton

1918–2010
- Seats: One
- Replaced by: Taunton Deane

1295–1918
- Seats: Two (1295–1885), one (1885–1918)
- Type of constituency: Borough constituency

Taunton was a constituency represented in the House of Commons of the Parliament of the United Kingdom and its predecessors from 1295 to 2010, taking its name from the town of Taunton in Somerset. Until 1918, it was a parliamentary borough, electing two Member of Parliaments (MPs) between 1295 and 1885 and one from 1885 to 1918; the name was then transferred to a county constituency, electing one MP.

In the boundary changes that came into effect at the 2010 UK general election, the Boundary Commission for England replaced Taunton with a modified constituency called Taunton Deane to reflect the district name. The new constituency's boundaries are coterminous with the local government district of the same name.

== History ==
Famous MPs for the borough include Thomas Cromwell. The 1754 Taunton by-election was so fiercely contested that rioting broke out in which two people died. In the 2005 UK general election, the victorious Liberal Democrats candidate in Taunton required the smallest percentage swing from the Conservative Party MP for them to take the seat.

== Boundaries ==
- 1918–1950: the Borough of Taunton, the Urban Districts of Wellington and Wiveliscombe, and the Rural Districts of Dulverton, Taunton, and Wellington.
- 1950–1974: as 1918 but without Wiveliscombe Urban District, which had been absorbed by Wellington Rural District in 1933. The constituency boundaries remained unchanged.
- 1974–1983: as 1950 but with redrawn boundaries.
- 1983–2010: the Borough of Taunton Deane, and the District of West Somerset wards of Dulverton and Brushford, Exmoor, Haddon, and Quarme.

== Members of Parliament ==
=== MPs 1295–1640 ===
- Constituency created (1295)

Parliament	First member	Second member
1362	William Portman	?
1363, 1365, 1366, 1368, 1369, 1371	Unknown	
1372	William Portman	?
1373, 1376, 1377 (Jan), 1377 (Oct), 1378	Unknown	
1379	William Portman	?
1380 (Jan)	William Portman	?
1380 (Nov), 1381, 1382 (May), 1382 (Oct), 1383 (Feb), 1383 (Oct), 1384 (Apr)	Unknown	
1384 (Nov)	William Portman	?
1385	William Portman	?
1386	William Portman	William Marchaunt
1388 (Feb)	William Portman	William Marchaunt
1388 (Sep)	William Damarle	William Marchaunt
1390 (Jan)	John Porter	William Marchaunt
1390 (Nov)	Unknown	
1391	William Portman	William Marchaunt
1393	John Porter	William Marchaunt
1394	John Porter	William Marchaunt
1395	Walter Puryham	William Marchaunt
1397 (Jan)	Robert Coullyng	Robert Eysel
1397 (Sept)	Richard Marchaunt	John Northmore
1399	Walter Puryham	Edmund Rokes
1401	Unknown	
1402	William Portman	Ralph Sargor
1404 (Jan), 1404 (Oct)	Unknown	
1406	William Portman	Robert Bathe
1407	Richard Marchaunt	John Northmore
1410	Thomas Bacot	Thomas Edward
1411, 1413 (Feb)	Unknown	
1413 (May)	John Rydon	Lewis John
1414 (Apr)	John Marchaunt	Edmund Dyer
1414 (Nov)	John Marchaunt	Edmund Dyer
1415, 1416 (Mar), 1416 (Oct)	Unknown	
1417	John Rydon	Walter Portman
1419	Walter Portman	Robert Croke
1420	Robert Croke	William Borde
1421 (May)	Walter Portman	William Borde
1421 (Dec)	Walter Portman	John Bowe
1422	Walter Portman	?
1423	Unknown	
1425	Walter Portman	?
1426	Walter Portman	?
1427	Walter Portman	?
1429	Unknown	
1431	Walter Portman	?
1432, 1433	Unknown	
1435	Walter Portman	?
1437, 1439, 1442, 1445, 1447, 1449 (Feb), 1449 (Nov), 1450, 1453	Unknown	
1455	Ralph Legh	?
1459, 1460, 1461, 1463	Unknown	
1467	Sir William Danvers	Robert Ashetill
1470	Sir William Danvers	Edward Aysshton
1472	Sir William Danvers	?
1478	Edward Aysshton	Robert Lovelord
1483–1523	Unknown	
1529	Thomas Cromwell	William Portman
1536	?Richard Pollard	?William Portman
1547	Sir Nicholas Hare	John Caryll
1553 (Mar)	John Mason	?
1553 (Oct)	James Basset	Jacques Wingfield
1554 (Apr)	William Barne	Oliver Vachell
1554 (Nov)	Thomas Eden	John Norres
1555	Dr Valentine Dale	?
1558	Dr Valentine Dale	Richard Myrfield
1559	Dr Valentine Dale	?
1563–7	Miles Sandys	Anthony Leigh
1571	Robert Hill	Richard Blount
1572–81	Roger Hill	Richard Blount; Edmund Hodges
1584–5	Alexander Pym; Maurice Horner	William Goldwell
1586–7	Francis Bacon	John Goldwell
1588–9	Thomas Fisher	John Goldwell
1593	William Aubrey, DCL	John Davidge
1597–8	Edward Barker	Edward Hext
1601	John Bond	Daniel Donne, DCL
1604–11	John Bond	Edward Hext
Addled Parliament (1614)	James Clarke	John Donne
1621–2	Lewis Pope	Thomas Brereton
Happy Parliament (1624–5)	Roger Prowse	Thomas Brereton
Useless Parliament (1625)	Hugh Portman	Thomas Brereton
1625–6	Sir Robert Gorges	George Browne
1628	Hugh Portman	George Browne
1629–40	No Parliament summoned	

=== MPs 1640–1885 ===
Year	First member	First party	Second member	Second party
April 1640	Sir William Portman	Royalist	Roger Hill	Parliamentarian
November 1640	Sir William Portman	Royalist	George Searle	Parliamentarian
February 1644	Portman disabled from sitting — seat vacant		George Searle	Parliamentarian
1645	John Palmer, MD		George Searle	Parliamentarian
1653	Taunton was unrepresented in the Barebone's Parliament			
1654	Colonel Thomas Gorges		John Gorges	
1656	Colonel Thomas Gorges		Admiral Robert Blake	
January 1659	Colonel Thomas Gorges		Sir William Wyndham	
May 1659	John Palmer, MD		One seat vacant	
March 1660	Thomas Gorges		Sir William Wyndham	
1661	Sir William Portman		Sir William Wyndham	
February 1679	Sir William Portman		John Trenchard	Whig
September 1679	Sir John Cutler Bt		John Trenchard	Whig
1680	Edmund Prideaux		John Trenchard	Whig
1685	Sir William Portman	Tory	John Sanford	Tory
March 1690	Sir William Portman	Tory	Edward Clarke	Whig
April 1690	John Speke	Whig	Edward Clarke	Whig
1698	Henry Seymour Portman	Tory	Edward Clarke	Whig
1701 by-election	Sir Francis Warre	Tory	Edward Clarke	Whig
1710	Sir Francis Warre	Tory	Henry Seymour Portman	Tory
1715	William Pynsent	Whig	James Smith	Whig
1722	John Trenchard	Whig	James Smith	Whig
1724 by-election	Abraham Elton	Whig	James Smith	Whig
1727	George Speke	Whig	Francis Fane	Whig
1734	Henry William Berkeley Portman	Tory	Francis Fane	Whig
1741	Sir John Chapman	Whig	John Buck	Tory
1745	Sir John Chapman	Whig	Percy Wyndham-O'Brien	Whig
1747	Sir Charles Wyndham	Whig	Robert Webb	Whig
1750	Admiral William Rowley	Whig	Robert Webb	Whig
1754	The Lord Carpenter	Whig	John Halliday	Whig
1754 by-election	The Lord Carpenter	Whig	Robert Maxwell	Whig
1762	Laurence Sulivan	Whig	Robert Maxwell	Whig
1768	Alexander Popham		Nathaniel Webb	
1774	Hon. Edward Stratford	Whig	Nathaniel Webb	
1775	John Halliday		Alexander Popham	
1780	John Halliday		Major-General John Roberts	
1782 by-election	John Halliday		(Sir) Benjamin Hammet	
1784	Alexander Popham		(Sir) Benjamin Hammet	
1796	William Morland		(Sir) Benjamin Hammet	
1800	William Morland		John Hammet	
1806	Alexander Baring	Whig	John Hammet	
1812	Alexander Baring	Whig	Henry Powell Collins	Tory
1818	Alexander Baring	Whig	Sir William Burroughs, Bt	Whig
1819	Alexander Baring	Whig	Henry Powell Collins	Tory
1820	Alexander Baring	Whig	John Ashley Warre	Whig
1826	Henry Seymour	Tory	William Peachey	Tory
1830	Henry Labouchere	Whig	Edward Thomas Bainbridge	Whig
1842 by-election	Henry Labouchere	Whig	Sir Edward Colebrooke	Whig
1852	Henry Labouchere	Whig	Arthur Mills	Conservative
1853 by-election	Henry Labouchere	Whig	Sir John Ramsden	Whig
1857	Henry Labouchere	Whig	Arthur Mills	Conservative
1859	Henry Labouchere	Liberal	Arthur Mills	Conservative
1859 by-election	George Cavendish-Bentinck	Conservative	Arthur Mills	Conservative
1865	Alexander Charles Barclay	Liberal	Lord William Hay	Liberal
1868	Alexander Charles Barclay	Liberal	Edward William Cox	Conservative
1869	Alexander Charles Barclay	Liberal	(Sir) Henry James	Liberal
1873 by-election	Alexander Charles Barclay	Liberal	(Sir) Henry James	Liberal
1880	Sir William Palliser	Conservative	(Sir) Henry James	Liberal
1882 by-election	Samuel Allsopp	Conservative	(Sir) Henry James	Liberal
1885	Representation reduced to one Member			

=== MPs since 1885 ===
Election	Member	Party
1885	Samuel Allsopp	Conservative
1887 by-election	Alfred Percy Allsopp	Conservative
1895	Sir Alfred Welby	Conservative
1906	Sir Edward Boyle	Conservative
1909 by-election	William Peel	Conservative
1912 by-election	Sir Gilbert Wills	Unionist
1918	Dennis Boles	Unionist
1921 by-election	Sir Arthur Griffith-Boscawen	Unionist
1922	Sir John Hope Simpson	Liberal
1924	Hamilton Gault	Unionist
1935	Edward Wickham	Conservative
1945	Victor Collins	Labour
1950	Henry Hopkinson	Conservative
1956 by-election	Sir Edward du Cann	Conservative
1987	David Nicholson	Conservative
1997	Jackie Ballard	Liberal Democrat
2001	Adrian Flook	Conservative
2005	Jeremy Browne	Liberal Democrat
2010	Constituency abolished	

== Elections ==
=== Elections in the 1830s ===
General election 1830: Taunton (2 seats)
Party	Candidate	Votes	%	±%
Whig	Henry Labouchere	430	46.1	N/A
Whig	Edward Thomas Bainbridge	280	30.0	N/A
Tory	William Peachey	223	23.9	
Majority		57	6.1	N/A
Turnout		533	c. 66.6	
Registered electors		c. 800		
Whig gain from Tory		Swing		
Whig gain from Tory		Swing		

General election 1831: Taunton (2 seats)
Party	Candidate	Votes	%
Whig	Henry Labouchere	Unopposed	
Whig	Edward Thomas Bainbridge	Unopposed	
Registered electors		c. 800	
Whig hold			
Whig hold			

Labouchere was appointed as a Lord of the Admiralty, causing a by-election.

By-election, 12 June 1832: Taunton
Party	Candidate	Votes	%
Whig	Henry Labouchere	Unopposed	
Registered electors		c. 800	
Whig hold			

General election 1832: Taunton (2 seats)
Party	Candidate	Votes	%
Whig	Henry Labouchere	Unopposed	
Whig	Edward Thomas Bainbridge	Unopposed	
Registered electors		949	
Whig hold			
Whig hold			

General election 1835: Taunton (2 seats)
Party	Candidate	Votes	%
Whig	Henry Labouchere	Unopposed	
Whig	Edward Thomas Bainbridge	Unopposed	
Registered electors		920	
Whig hold			
Whig hold			

Labouchere was appointed as vice-president of the Board of Trade, and Master of the Mint, requiring a by-election.

By-election, 29 April 1835: Taunton
Party	Candidate	Votes	%
Whig	Henry Labouchere	452	61.6
Conservative	Benjamin Disraeli	282	38.4
Majority		170	23.2
Turnout		734	79.8
Registered electors		920	
Whig hold			

General election 1837: Taunton (2 seats)
Party	Candidate	Votes	%
Whig	Henry Labouchere	469	36.3
Whig	Edward Thomas Bainbridge	414	32.0
Conservative	Robert Newton Lee	409	31.7
Majority		5	0.3
Turnout		798	84.6
Registered electors		943	
Whig hold			
Whig hold			

=== Elections in the 1840s ===
General election 1841: Taunton (2 seats)
Party	Candidate	Votes	%	±%
Whig	Henry Labouchere	430	29.9	−6.4
Whig	Edward Thomas Bainbridge	409	28.4	−3.6
Conservative	William Wilberforce	381	26.5	+10.7
Conservative	James Hall	218	15.2	−0.7
Majority		28	1.9	+1.6
Turnout		759	88.7	+4.1
Registered electors		856		
Whig hold		Swing	−5.7	
Whig hold		Swing	−4.3	

Bainbridge resigned by accepting the office of Steward of the Chiltern Hundreds, causing a by-election.

By-election, 11 February 1842: Taunton
Party	Candidate	Votes	%	±%
Whig	Edward Colebrooke	394	53.9	−4.4
Conservative	James Hall	337	46.1	+4.4
Majority		57	7.8	+5.9
Turnout		731	72.4	−16.3
Registered electors		1,010		
Whig hold		Swing	−4.4	

Labouchere was appointed Chief Secretary to the Lord Lieutenant of Ireland, requiring a by-election.

By-election, 10 July 1846: Taunton
Party	Candidate	Votes	%	±%
Whig	Henry Labouchere	Unopposed		
Whig hold				

General election 1847: Taunton (2 seats)
Party	Candidate	Votes	%	±%
Whig	Henry Labouchere	543	41.5	+11.6
Whig	Edward Colebrooke	388	29.7	+1.3
Conservative	Arthur Mills	376	28.8	−12.9
Majority		12	0.9	−1.0
Turnout		654 (est)	71.7 (est)	−17.0
Registered electors		911		
Whig hold		Swing	+9.0	
Whig hold		Swing	+3.9	

=== Elections in the 1850s ===
General election 1852: Taunton (2 seats)
Party	Candidate	Votes	%	±%
Whig	Henry Labouchere	430	37.4	−4.1
Conservative	Arthur Mills	361	31.4	+2.6
Whig	Edward Colebrooke	358	31.2	+1.5
Turnout		575 (est)	72.7 (est)	+1.0
Registered electors		790		
Majority		69	6.0	+5.1
Whig hold		Swing	−2.7	
Majority		3	0.2	N/A
Conservative gain from Whig		Swing	+2.6	

Mills' election was declared void on petition.

By-election, 4 May 1853: Taunton
Party	Candidate	Votes	%	±%
Whig	John William Ramsden	372	50.3	−18.3
Conservative	Henry Badcock	367	49.7	+18.3
Majority		5	0.6	−5.4
Turnout		739	83.4	+10.7
Registered electors		886		
Whig gain from Conservative		Swing	−18.3	

Labouchere was appointed Secretary of State for the Colonies, requiring a by-election.

By-election, 5 February 1856: Taunton
Party	Candidate	Votes	%	±%
Whig	Henry Labouchere	Unopposed		
Whig hold				

General election 1857: Taunton (2 seats)
Party	Candidate	Votes	%	±%
Whig	Henry Labouchere	442	36.6	−0.8
Conservative	Arthur Mills	401	33.2	+1.8
Whig	William Campbell	366	30.3	−0.9
Turnout		605 (est)	68.2 (est)	−4.5
Registered electors		887		
Majority		41	3.4	−2.6
Whig hold		Swing	−0.9	
Majority		35	2.9	+2.7
Conservative hold		Swing	+1.8	

General election 1859: Taunton (2 seats)
Party	Candidate	Votes	%	±%
Conservative	Arthur Mills	415	30.0	+13.4
Liberal	Henry Labouchere	388	28.1	−8.5
Conservative	George Cavendish-Bentinck	325	23.5	+6.9
Liberal	William Beadon	255	18.4	−11.9
Turnout		692 (est)	83.1 (est)	+14.9
Registered electors		832		
Majority		27	1.9	−1.0
Conservative hold		Swing	+11.8	
Majority		63	4.6	+1.2
Liberal hold		Swing	−9.3	

Labouchere was elevated to the peerage, becoming Lord 1st Baron Taunton and causing a by-election.

By-election, 9 August 1859: Taunton
Party	Candidate	Votes	%	±%
Conservative	George Cavendish-Bentinck	382	53.1	−0.4
Liberal	Alexander Charles Barclay	337	46.9	+0.4
Majority		45	6.2	N/A
Turnout		719	86.4	+3.3
Registered electors		832		
Conservative gain from Liberal		Swing	−0.4	

=== Elections in the 1860s ===
General election 1865: Taunton (2 seats)
Party	Candidate	Votes	%	±%
Liberal	Alexander Charles Barclay	478	31.9	+3.8
Liberal	William Hay	470	31.3	+12.9
Conservative	Edward William Cox	292	19.5	−10.5
Conservative	Alfred Austin	260	17.3	−6.2
Majority		178	11.8	+7.2
Turnout		750 (est)	89.4 (est)	+6.3
Registered electors		839		
Liberal hold		Swing	+6.1	
Liberal gain from Conservative		Swing	+10.6	

General election 1868: Taunton (2 seats)
Party	Candidate	Votes	%	±%
Liberal	Alexander Charles Barclay	1,105	37.0	+5.1
Conservative	Edward William Cox	988	33.1	−3.7
Liberal	Henry James	890	29.8	−1.5
Turnout		1,492 (est)	75.4 (est)	−14.0
Registered electors		1,977		
Majority		117	3.9	−8.1
Liberal hold		Swing	+3.5	
Majority		98	3.3	N/A
Conservative gain from Liberal		Swing	−3.7	

On petition, Cox's election was scrutinised, and some of his votes were found to have been acquired by bribery, and were then struck off. This caused him to be unseated on 8 March 1869 and James was declared elected. While a petition was then lodged against James, the court ruled a petitioner who had been seated on petition could not then be petitioned against.

=== Elections in the 1870s ===
James was appointed Solicitor General for England and Wales, causing a by-election.

By-election, 14 Oct 1873: Taunton (1 seat)
Party	Candidate	Votes	%	±%
Liberal	Henry James	899	52.5	−14.3
Conservative	Sir Alfred Frederic Adolphus Slade, 3rd Baronet	812	47.5	+14.4
Majority		87	5.0	+1.1
Turnout		1,711	89.4	+14.0
Registered electors		1,913		
Liberal hold		Swing	−14.4	

General election 1874: Taunton (2 seats)
Party	Candidate	Votes	%	±%
Liberal	Henry James	Unopposed		
Liberal	Alexander Charles Barclay	Unopposed		
Registered electors		1,999		
Liberal hold				
Liberal gain from Conservative				

=== Elections in the 1880s ===
General election 1880: Taunton (2 seats)
Party	Candidate	Votes	%	±%
Conservative	William Palliser	1,084	26.9	New
Liberal	Henry James	1,000	24.9	N/A
Conservative	William Cargill	971	24.1	New
Liberal	Roger Eykyn	968	24.1	N/A
Turnout		2,012 (est)	90.4 (est)	N/A
Registered electors		2,225		
Majority		84	2.8	N/A
Conservative gain from Liberal		Swing		
Majority		29	0.8	N/A
Liberal hold		Swing		

James was appointed Attorney General for England and Wales, requiring a by-election.

By-election, 8 May 1880: Taunton (1 seat)
Party	Candidate	Votes	%	±%
Liberal	Henry James	Unopposed		
Liberal hold				

Palliser's death caused a by-election.

By-election, 17 Feb 1882: Taunton (1 seat)
Party	Candidate	Votes	%	±%
Conservative	Samuel Allsopp	1,144	55.5	+4.5
Liberal	Frederick Lambart	917	44.5	−4.5
Majority		227	11.0	+8.2
Turnout		2,061	87.3	−3.1 (est)
Registered electors		2,362		
Conservative hold		Swing	+4.5	

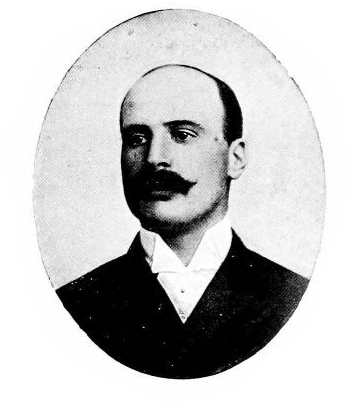
Jessel

General election 1885: Taunton (1 seat)
Party	Candidate	Votes	%	±%
Conservative	Samuel Allsopp	1,361	58.2	+7.2
Liberal	Charles Jessel	978	41.8	−7.2
Majority		383	16.4	+14.3
Turnout		2,339	92.1	+1.7 (est)
Registered electors		2,541		
Conservative hold		Swing	+7.2	

General election 1886: Taunton
Party	Candidate	Votes	%	±%
Conservative	Samuel Allsopp	Unopposed		
Conservative hold				

Allsopp succeeded to the peerage, becoming Lord Hindlip, causing a by-election.

By-election, 23 Apr 1887: Taunton
Party	Candidate	Votes	%	±%
Conservative	Alfred Allsopp	1,426	61.6	N/A
Liberal	James Harris Sanders	890	38.4	New
Majority		536	23.2	N/A
Turnout		2,316	89.4	N/A
Registered electors		2,825		
Conservative hold		Swing	N/A	

=== Elections in the 1890s ===
General election 1892: Taunton
Party	Candidate	Votes	%	±%
Conservative	Alfred Allsopp	1,402	60.4	N/A
Liberal	Henry Hewitt Bridgman	921	39.6	N/A
Majority		481	20.8	N/A
Turnout		2,323	82.2	N/A
Registered electors		2,825		
Conservative hold		Swing		

General election 1895: Taunton
Party	Candidate	Votes	%	±%
Conservative	Alfred Welby	Unopposed		
Conservative hold				

=== Elections in the 1900s ===
General election 1900: Taunton
Party	Candidate	Votes	%	±%
Conservative	Alfred Welby	1,387	57.5	N/A
Liberal	Walker King	1,024	42.5	New
Majority		363	15.0	N/A
Turnout		2,411	73.7	N/A
Registered electors		3,272		
Conservative hold		Swing	N/A	

General election 1906: Taunton
Party	Candidate	Votes	%	±%
Conservative	Edward Boyle	1,842	55.1	−2.4
Liberal	Arthur Ponsonby	1,503	44.9	+2.4
Majority		339	10.2	−4.8
Turnout		3,345	93.2	+18.5
Registered electors		3,590		
Conservative hold		Swing	-2.4	

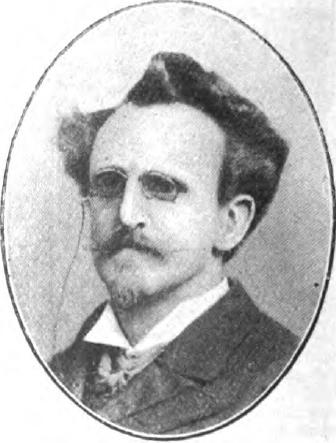
Smith

1909 Taunton by-election
Party	Candidate	Votes	%	±%
Conservative	William Peel	1,976	64.6	+9.5
Labour	Frank Smith	1,085	35.4	New
Majority		891	29.2	+19.0
Turnout		3,061	80.4	−12.8
Registered electors		3,808		
Conservative hold		Swing	N/A	

=== Elections in the 1910s ===
Peel

General election January 1910: Taunton
Party	Candidate	Votes	%	±%
Conservative	William Peel	1,906	55.3	+0.2
Liberal	William Arthur Addinsell	1,538	44.7	−0.2
Majority		368	10.6	+0.4
Turnout		3,444	90.3	−2.9
Registered electors		3,814		
Conservative hold		Swing	+0.2	

General election December 1910: Taunton
Party	Candidate	Votes	%	±%
Conservative	William Peel	1,806	53.4	−1.9
Liberal	John Edward Schunck	1,573	46.6	+1.9
Majority		233	6.8	−3.8
Turnout		3,379	88.6	−1.7
Registered electors		3,814		
Conservative hold		Swing	−1.9	

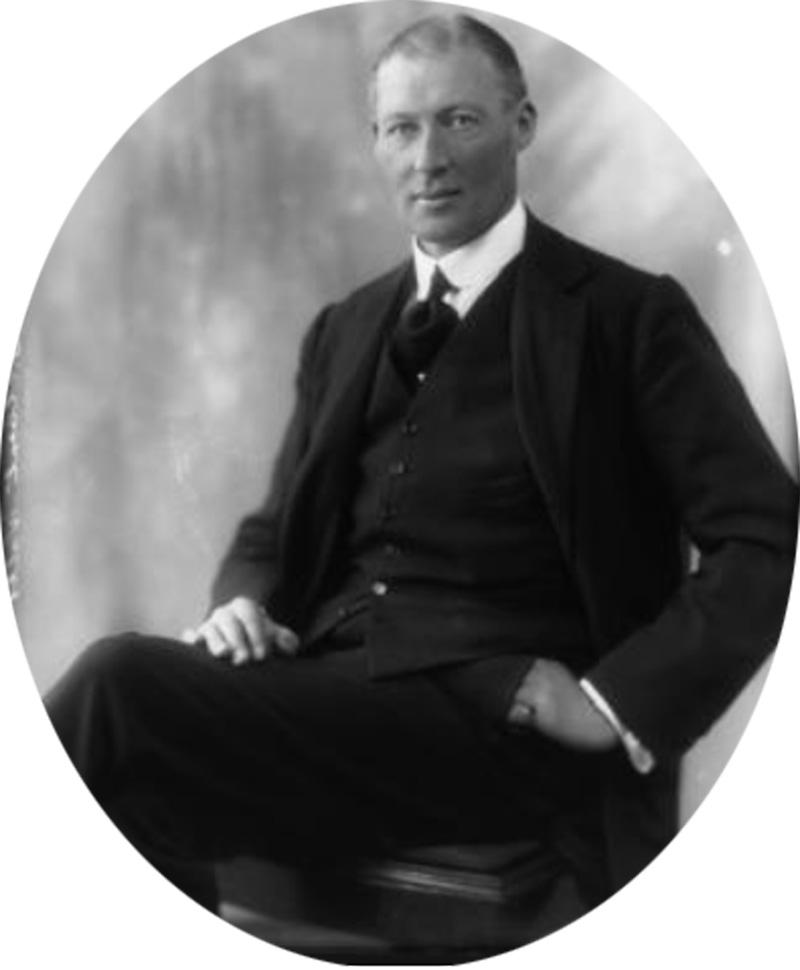
Wills

1912 Taunton by-election
Party	Candidate	Votes	%	±%
Unionist	Gilbert Wills	1,882	54.1	+0.7
Liberal	John Edward Schunk	1,597	45.9	−0.7
Majority		285	8.2	+1.4
Turnout		3,479	88.7	+0.1
Registered electors		3,921		
Unionist hold		Swing	+0.7	

General Election 1914–15:

Another General Election was required to take place before the end of 1915. The political parties had been making preparations for an election to take place and by the July 1914, the following candidates had been selected;

- Unionist: Gilbert Wills
- Liberal: James Bromley Eames

General election 1918: Taunton
Party		Candidate	Votes	%	±%
C	Unionist	Dennis Boles	12,619	72.4	+19.0
	Labour	George Woods	4,816	27.6	New
Majority			7,803	44.8	+38.0
Turnout			17,435	60.4	−28.2
	Unionist hold		Swing	N/A	
C indicates candidate endorsed by the coalition government.

=== Elections in the 1920s ===
1921 Taunton by-election
Party		Candidate	Votes	%	±%
C	Unionist	Arthur Griffith-Boscawen	12,994	61.1	−11.3
	Labour	James Lunnon	8,290	38.9	+11.3
Majority			4,704	22.2	−22.6
Turnout			21,284	73.5	+13.1
	Unionist hold		Swing	-11.3	
C indicates candidate endorsed by the coalition government.

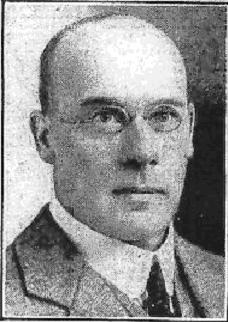
John Simpson

General election 1922: Taunton
Party	Candidate	Votes	%	±%
Liberal	John Hope Simpson	13,195	56.4	New
Unionist	Arthur Griffith-Boscawen	10,182	43.6	−28.8
Majority		3,007	12.8	N/A
Turnout		23,377	79.1	+18.7
Liberal gain from Unionist		Swing	N/A	

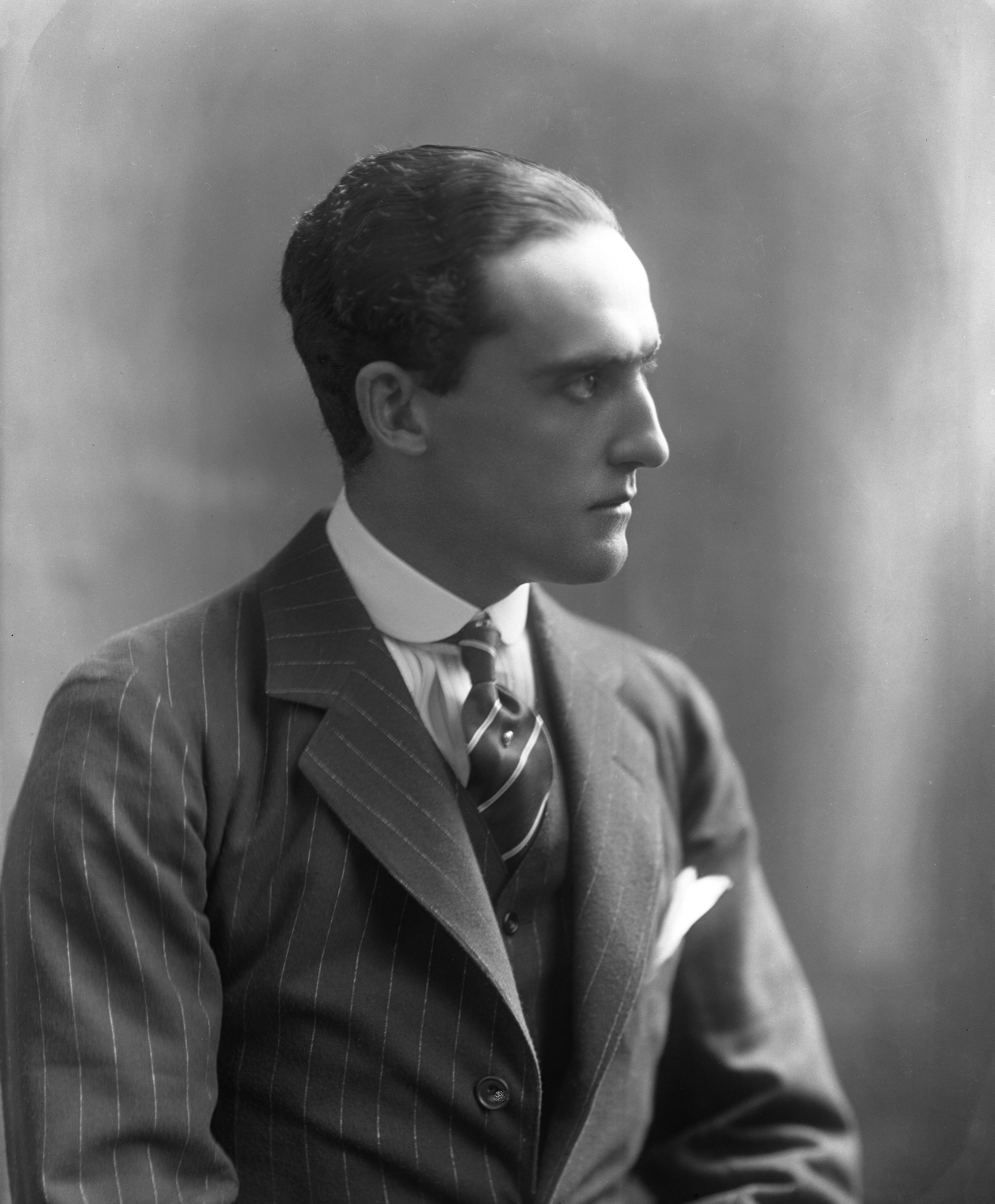
Andrew Gault

General election 1923: Taunton
Party	Candidate	Votes	%	±%
Liberal	John Hope Simpson	13,053	52.5	−3.9
Unionist	Hamilton Gault	11,798	47.5	+3.9
Majority		1,255	5.0	−7.8
Turnout		24,851	82.6	+3.5
Liberal hold		Swing	-3.9	

General election 1924: Taunton
Party	Candidate	Votes	%	±%
Unionist	Hamilton Gault	13,930	52.1	+4.6
Liberal	John Hope Simpson	10,381	38.8	−13.7
Labour	George Woods	2,441	9.1	New
Majority		3,549	13.3	N/A
Turnout		26,752	85.6	+3.0
Unionist gain from Liberal		Swing	+9.1	

General election 1929: Taunton
Party	Candidate	Votes	%	±%
Unionist	Hamilton Gault	15,083	45.9	−6.2
Liberal	Walter Rea	11,121	33.9	−4.9
Labour	Joseph Sparks	6,615	20.2	+11.1
Majority		3,962	12.0	−1.3
Turnout		32,819	82.2	−3.4
Unionist hold		Swing	-0.6	

=== Elections in the 1930s ===
General election 1931: Taunton
Party	Candidate	Votes	%	±%
Conservative	Hamilton Gault	22,564	72.95	
Labour	Frank George Bushnell	8,367	27.05	
Majority		14,197	45.90	
Turnout		30,931	75.43	
Conservative hold		Swing		

General election 1935: Taunton
Party	Candidate	Votes	%	±%
Conservative	Edward Wickham	19,443	63.41	
Labour	James Lunnon	11,219	36.59	
Majority		8,224	26.82	
Turnout		30,720	72.39	
Conservative hold		Swing		

=== Elections in the 1940s ===
General Election 1939–40

Another General Election was required to take place before the end of 1940. The political parties had been making preparations for an election to take place and by the Autumn of 1939, the following candidates had been selected;

- Conservative: Edward Wickham
- Labour: Charles W. Gott

General election 1945: Taunton
Party	Candidate	Votes	%	±%
Labour	Victor Collins	19,976	52.80	
Conservative	Edward Wickham	17,858	47.20	
Majority		2,118	5.60	N/A
Turnout		37,834	72.98	
Labour gain from Conservative		Swing		

=== Elections in the 1950s ===
General election 1950: Taunton
Party	Candidate	Votes	%	±%
Conservative	Henry Hopkinson	20,724	46.43	
Labour	Victor Collins	19,352	43.35	
Liberal	John Robert Phillipson	4,561	10.22	New
Majority		1,372	3.08	N/A
Turnout		44,637	88.81	
Conservative gain from Labour		Swing		

General election 1951: Taunton
Party	Candidate	Votes	%	±%
Conservative	Henry Hopkinson	24,826	54.36	
Labour	Victor Collins	20,845	45.64	
Majority		3,981	8.72	
Turnout		45,671	89.00	
Conservative hold		Swing		

General election 1955: Taunton
Party	Candidate	Votes	%	±%
Conservative	Henry Hopkinson	22,962	52.11	
Labour	Reginald Wells-Pestell	17,420	39.53	
Liberal	Guy Barrington	3,684	8.36	New
Majority		5,542	12.58	
Turnout		44,066	85.46	
Conservative hold		Swing		

1956 Taunton by-election
Party	Candidate	Votes	%	±%
Conservative	Edward du Cann	19,820	50.84	−1.27
Labour	Reginald Wells-Pestell	19,163	49.16	+9.63
Majority		657	1.68	−10.90
Turnout		38,983		
Conservative hold		Swing		

General election 1959: Taunton
Party	Candidate	Votes	%	±%
Conservative	Edward du Cann	22,680	49.42	
Labour	Leonard V Pike	16,182	35.26	
Liberal	Charles Meddon Karslake Bruton	7,031	15.32	
Majority		6,498	14.16	
Turnout		45,893	87.12	
Conservative hold		Swing		

=== Elections in the 1960s ===
General election 1964: Taunton
Party	Candidate	Votes	%	±%
Conservative	Edward du Cann	21,367	46.52	
Labour	Leonard V Pike	16,619	36.18	
Liberal	Margaret Irene Gaenor Heathcoat Amory	7,944	17.30	
Majority		4,748	10.34	
Turnout		45,930	84.74	
Conservative hold		Swing		

General election 1966: Taunton
Party	Candidate	Votes	%	±%
Conservative	Edward du Cann	22,369	47.55	
Labour	Robin J Bradbury	19,216	40.85	
Liberal	Margaret Irene Gaenor Heathcoat Amory	5,460	11.61	
Majority		3,153	6.70	
Turnout		47,045	85.27	
Conservative hold		Swing		

=== Elections in the 1970s ===
General election 1970: Taunton
Party	Candidate	Votes	%	±%
Conservative	Edward du Cann	26,158	53.55	
Labour	Steven Mama	17,823	36.48	
Liberal	Gerard O'Donnell	4,871	9.97	
Majority		8,335	17.07	
Turnout		48,852	78.96	
Conservative hold		Swing		

General election February 1974: Taunton
Party	Candidate	Votes	%	±%
Conservative	Edward du Cann	23,841	45.11	
Labour	D.W. Keene	15,401	29.14	
Liberal	M.E. Mann	13,607	25.75	
Majority		8,440	15.97	
Turnout		52,849	83.88	
Conservative hold		Swing		

General election October 1974: Taunton
Party	Candidate	Votes	%	±%
Conservative	Edward du Cann	22,542	44.61	
Labour	Barry Sheerman	15,721	31.11	
Liberal	M.E. Mann	11,984	23.72	
United Democratic Party	L.D. Bradford	283	0.56	New
Majority		6,821	13.50	
Turnout		50,530	79.38	
Conservative hold		Swing		

General election 1979: Taunton
Party	Candidate	Votes	%	±%
Conservative	Edward du Cann	28,483	53.17	
Labour	S. Horne	15,759	29.42	
Liberal	M. Lee	7,928	14.80	
Ecology	G. Garbett	1,403	2.62	New
Majority		12,724	23.75	
Turnout		53,573	80.74	
Conservative hold		Swing		

=== Elections in the 1980s ===
General election 1983: Taunton
Party	Candidate	Votes	%	±%
Conservative	Edward du Cann	28,112	52.89	
SDP	Michael Cocks	15,545	29.24	
Labour	Jon Gray	9,498	17.87	
Majority		12,567	23.65	
Turnout		53,155	75.55	
Conservative hold		Swing		

General election 1987: Taunton
Party	Candidate	Votes	%	±%
Conservative	David Nicholson	30,248	51.38	
SDP	Michael Cocks	19,868	33.75	
Labour	Gary Reynolds	8,754	14.87	
Majority		10,380	17.63	
Turnout		58,870	79.40	
Conservative hold		Swing		

=== Elections in the 1990s ===
General election 1992: Taunton
Party	Candidate	Votes	%	±%
Conservative	David Nicholson	29,576	46.0	−5.4
Liberal Democrats	Jackie Ballard	26,240	40.8	+7.1
Labour	L. Jean Hole	8,151	12.7	−2.2
Natural Law	Philip A. Leavey	279	0.4	New
Majority		3,336	5.2	−12.4
Turnout		64,246	82.3	+2.9
Conservative hold		Swing	−6.2	

General election 1997: Taunton
Party	Candidate	Votes	%	±%
Liberal Democrats	Jackie Ballard	26,064	42.7	+1.9
Conservative	David Nicholson	23,621	38.7	−7.3
Labour	Elizabeth Lisgo	8,248	13.5	+0.8
Referendum	Brian Ahern	2,760	4.5	New
BNP	Leslie Andrews	318	0.5	New
Majority		2,443	4.0	N/A
Turnout		61,011	76.5	−5.8
Liberal Democrats gain from Conservative		Swing		

=== Elections in the 2000s ===
General election 2001: Taunton
Party	Candidate	Votes	%	±%
Conservative	Adrian Flook	23,033	41.7	+3.0
Liberal Democrats	Jackie Ballard	22,798	41.3	−1.4
Labour	Andrew Govier	8,254	14.9	+1.4
UKIP	Michael Canton	1,140	2.1	New
Majority		235	0.4	N/A
Turnout		55,225	67.6	−8.9
Conservative gain from Liberal Democrats		Swing		

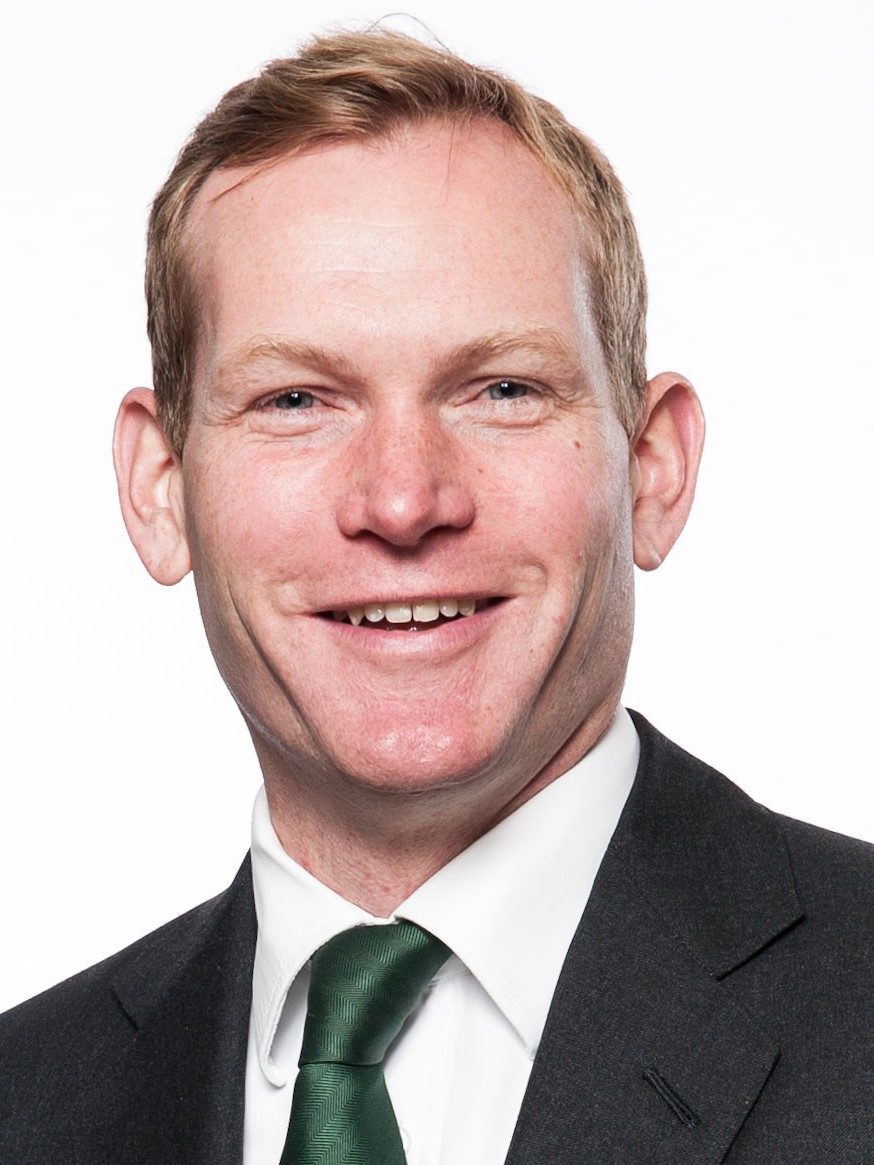
Jeremy Browne

General election 2005: Taunton
Party	Candidate	Votes	%	±%
Liberal Democrats	Jeremy Browne	25,764	43.3	+2.0
Conservative	Adrian Flook	25,191	42.3	+0.6
Labour	Andrew Govier	7,132	12.0	−2.9
UKIP	Helen Miles	1,441	2.4	+0.3
Majority		573	1.0	N/A
Turnout		59,528	69.7	+2.1
Liberal Democrats gain from Conservative		Swing	−0.7	

== See also ==
- List of parliamentary constituencies in Somerset

== Sources ==
- Robert Beatson, A Chronological Register of Both Houses of Parliament (London: Longman, Hurst, Res & Orme, 1807)
- D. Brunton & D. H. Pennington, Members of the Long Parliament (London: George Allen & Unwin, 1954)
- Cobbett's Parliamentary history of England, from the Norman Conquest in 1066 to the year 1803 (London: Thomas Hansard, 1808)
- Craig, F. W. S. (1983). British parliamentary election results 1918–1949 (3 ed.). Chichester: Parliamentary Research Services. ISBN 0-900178-06-X.
- F W S Craig, British Parliamentary Election Results 1832–1885 (2nd edition, Aldershot: Parliamentary Research Services, 1989)
- Maija Jansson (ed.), Proceedings in Parliament, 1614 (House of Commons) (Philadelphia: American Philosophical Society, 1988)
- J E Neale, The Elizabethan House of Commons (London: Jonathan Cape, 1949)
- Willis, Browne (1750). Notitia Parliamentaria, Part II: A Series or Lists of the Representatives in the several Parliaments held from the Reformation 1541, to the Restoration 1660 ... London. p. 1.
- Frederic A Youngs, jr, Guide to the Local Administrative Units of England, Vol I (London: Royal Historical Society, 1979)
- The BBC/ITN Guide to the New Parliamentary Constituencies (Chichester: Parliamentary Research Services, 1983)
- Concise Dictionary of National Biography
- List of speakers: Parliaments of 1656 and 1658-9, Diary of Thomas Burton esq, volume 4: March – April 1659 (1828) at British History Online
