= 1912 Taunton by-election =

UK parliamentary by-election

The 1912 Taunton by-election was a Parliamentary by-election held for the British House of Commons constituency of Taunton in Somerset on 11 November 1912. Taunton returned one Member of Parliament (MP) to the House of Commons of the United Kingdom, elected by the first past the post voting system.

== Vacancy ==
William Peel had been Unionist MP for Taunton since 1909. He inherited his father's viscountcy in 1912, and moved to the House of Lords.

== Previous result ==
General election December 1910: Taunton Electorate 3,590
Party	Candidate	Votes	%	±%
Conservative	William Peel	1,806	53.4	−1.9
Liberal	John Edward Schunk	1,573	46.6	+1.9
Majority		233	6.8	−3.8
Turnout		3,379	88.6	−1.7
Conservative hold		Swing	-1.9	

== Result ==
Wills held the seat for the Unionist Party.

1912 by-Election: Taunton Electorate
Party	Candidate	Votes	%	±%
Unionist	Gilbert Wills	1,882	54.1	+0.7
Liberal	John Edward Schunk	1,597	45.9	−0.7
Majority		285	8.2	+1.4
Turnout		3,479	88.7	+0.1
Unionist hold		Swing	+0.7	

== Aftermath ==
A General Election was due to take place by the end of 1915. By the summer of 1914, the following candidates had been adopted to contest that election. Due to the outbreak of war, the election never took place.

General Election 1914/15: Electorate 3,914
Party	Candidate	Votes	%	±%
Unionist	Gilbert Wills			
Liberal				

In 1918, Wills switched to contest the neighbouring seat of Weston super mare.

General election 14 December 1918: Electorate 28,845
Party	Candidate	Votes	%	±%
Unionist	*Dennis Boles	12,619	72.4	+19.0
Labour	George Woods	4,816	27.6	New
Majority		7,803	44.8	+38.0
Turnout		17,435	60.4	−28.2
Unionist hold		Swing	N/A	

- Boles was the endorsed candidate of the Coalition Government.
