= John Hope Simpson =

British Liberal politician (1868–1961)

Sir John Hope Simpson KBE CIE
- 1922
- Born: 23 July 1868; West Derby
- Died: 10 April 1961 (aged 92)
- Education: Liverpool College
- Occupations: Civil Servant, MP and diplomat

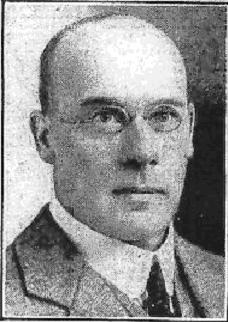
John Hope Simpson

Sir John Hope Simpson KBE CIE OBJ (23 July 1868 – 10 April 1961) was a British Liberal politician who served as a Member of Parliament in the United Kingdom and later in the Government of the Dominion of Newfoundland.

Hope Simpson was born in West Derby, son of John Hope Simpson of Sefton Park, Liverpool and Margaret Swan. He was christened "John Hope" and educated at Liverpool College and Balliol College, Oxford.

== Civil service ==
Hope Simpson was in the Indian Civil Service between 1897 and 1916. He held numerous governmental posts, having been acting chief commander of the Andaman and Nicobar Islands. He was Private Secretary to the Ministry of Labour in 1917.

He was DM (District Magistrate) of Gorakhpur, UP, India when first Intermediate School of City was founded in year 1909. He was very instrumental in its foundation and passed several order by going beyond the strict norms of the society foundation. The society was registered as 'Gorakhpur High School Society' and later on the name of Gandhi (Father of the Nation) it was renamed MG Inter College as Gandhi himself visited the campus.

== Politics ==
Hope Simpson ran as Liberal candidate and was elected at the 1922 general election becoming Member of Parliament (MP) for the previously Conservative-held constituency of Taunton in Somerset. He was re-elected in 1923 general election, but was defeated at the 1924 general election. He did not stand for Parliament again.

On Zionism he believed that Arab population was "economically powerless against such a strong movement" and thus needed protection. Charles Anderson writes that Hope Simpson was also "wary of the gulf between Zionist rhetoric and practice, observing that 'The most lofty sentiments are ventilated in public meetings and in Zionist propaganda' but that the Jewish National Fund and other organs of the movement did not uphold or embody a vision of cooperation or mutual benefit with the Arabs".

== Later career ==
In the 1925 Birthday Honours, Hope Simpson was knighted. Following his parliamentary defeat he assumed a number of posts for various organisations, including the League of Nations, as an expert on the question of refugees. He was posted first to Greece to monitor the 1923 population exchange between Greece and Turkey.

Following the widespread 1929 Palestine riots he was sent to British Mandate Palestine on a fact finding mission, which resulted in the Hope Simpson Report in 1930.

During the 1931 China floods the League of Nations sent Hope Simpson to China, where he became director-general of the National Flood Relief Commission for the government of the Republic of China. As well as coordinating refugee relief, he became a strong critic of the Japanese aerial bombing of a flood refugee camp in Shanghai, following the January 28 Incident.

Coming out of retirement at 66 years of age, Sir John became the Commissioner of Natural Resources and Acting-Commissioner of Justice for The Commission of Government of Newfoundland from 1934 until 1936.

Port Hope Simpson was named after him in response to the most significant backing he had given to John Osborn Williams, the owner of the Labrador Development Company Limited, who set up a loggers' camp in Alexis Bay for cutting and exporting pitwood to Cardiff for the collieries of South Wales. Hope Simpson also established the Newfoundland Ranger Force a welfare and police force meant to link the people of Newfoundland and Labrador with The Commission of Government in St. John's.

In 1937 Sir John was appointed a Knight Commander of the Order of the British Empire (KBE) not so very long after his return from Newfoundland. In 1938 and 1939 he produced reports for Chatham House on Europe's refugee problem. He continued to be involved in the Jewish/Palestine Question after World War II. He contributed to the Report to General-Assembly, in 1947, for the United Nations Special Committee on Palestine.

Sir John Hope Simpson died on 10 April 1961. He left £29,764 16s to an unknown heir.

== See also ==
- Hope Simpson Royal Commission
- "Sir John Hope Simpson". Encyclopædia Britannica.
- Newfoundland and Labrador Heritage
- Craig, F. W. S. (1983) [1969]. British parliamentary election results 1918-1949 (3rd ed.). Chichester: Parliamentary Research Services. ISBN 0-900178-06-X.

== Bibliography ==
- John Hope Simpson, Refugees: preliminary report of a survey, Institute of International Affairs, 1938
- John Hope Simpson, The Refugee Problem, Institute of International Affairs, October 1939

== Notes ==
- ISBN 0-900178-06-X.
- "Sir John Hope Simpson". Encyclopædia Britannica.
- Newfoundland and Labrador Heritage
- Craig, F. W. S. (1983) [1969]. British parliamentary election results 1918-1949 (3rd ed.). Chichester: Parliamentary Research Services. ISBN 0-900178-06-X.
- Leigh Rayment's Peerage Pages

Parliament of the United Kingdom
Preceded by Sir Arthur Griffith-Boscawen	Member of Parliament for Taunton; 1922–1924	Succeeded by Hamilton Gault
