= 1873 Taunton by-election =

UK Parliamentary by-election

The 1873 Taunton by-election was fought on 13 October 1873. The by-election was fought due to the incumbent MP of the Liberal Party, Henry James, becoming Solicitor General for England and Wales. It was retained by Henry James who defeated Alfred Slade.
