= 1909 Taunton by-election =

UK Parliamentary by-election

← 1906	23 February 1909	Jan. 1910 →

Candidate	Peel	Smith
Party	Conservative	Labour
Popular vote	1,976	1,085
Percentage	64.6%	35.4%
MP before election
Sir Edward Boyle
Conservative
Subsequent MP
William Peel
Conservative

The 1909 Taunton by-election was held on 23 February 1909. The by-election was held due to the ill health of the incumbent Conservative MP, Edward Boyle. It was won by the Conservative candidate William Peel, previously the MP for Manchester South. Peel was the son of Arthur Peel, 1st Viscount Peel, a former Liberal MP and Speaker of the House of Commons, and the grandson of former Prime Minister Robert Peel.

Peel

Taunton by-election, 1909
Party	Candidate	Votes	%	±%
Conservative	William Peel	1,976	64.6	+9.5
Labour	Frank Smith	1,085	35.4	New
Majority		891	29.2	+19.0
Turnout		3,061	80.4	−12.8
Conservative hold		Swing	N/A	
