= John Northmore (MP) =

Member of the Parliament of England

John Northmore (died 1415/16), of Taunton, Somerset, was a wool and cloth merchant.

He was a Member of Parliament for Taunton in September 1397 and 1407.
