= 1701 Taunton by-election =

UK parliamentary by-election

← Jan 1701	17 March 1701	Dec 1701 →
Candidate	Sir Francis Warre, Bt	Thomas Baker
Party	Tory	Whig
Popular vote	297	256
MP before election
Henry Portman
Tory
Subsequent MP
Sir Francis Warre, Bt
Tory

The 1701 Taunton by-election to the Parliament of England was held on 17 March 1701 in Taunton, Somerset, following the decision of the incumbent, Henry Portman, to sit in Wells. The by-election was contested by one of Portman's friends, Sir Francis Warre, 1st Baronet, and Thomas Baker, a Taunton merchant. Warre, a Tory, was elected, although Baker petitioned the result, claiming the Mayor was corrupt.

== Background ==
In the general election held in January and February 1701, Taunton returned both of its standing Members of Parliament, Henry Portman, a Tory, and Edward Clarke, a Whig. Portman had also stood, and been elected in the constituency of Wells. He chose to represent Wells, triggering a by-election in Taunton. In his history of Taunton, William Gibson suggests that he may have made the decision based upon Wells being a "less furiously divided town for a Tory."

Seymour suggested that his friend, Sir Francis Warre, 1st Baronet stand as the Tory candidate. Warre was one of the largest land-owners in Somerset, and had previously represented Bridgwater since 1685. He had been granted a baronetcy as a child, due to his father's support of the Royalists. Gibson claimed that he probably stood in Taunton in order to "bolster the Tory interest in his home town." The Whig candidate, Thomas Baker was a prominent merchant in Taunton.

== Result ==
The vote was held on Thursday 17 March 1701, and was won narrowly by Warre, who collected 297 votes. Baker, who had 256 votes, contested the election, accusing the Mayor of corruption. He claimed that the Mayor had not counted votes from qualified voters for himself, and also allowed illegal votes to be counted for Warre. The Mayor then ruled that the election would not be scrutinised, further angering Baker. A petition was put together by 63 of those whose votes had not been allowed for Baker, but it was never presented, and the matter was never heard in the House of Commons.

By-Election: Taunton
Party	Candidate	Votes	%	±%
Tory	Sir Francis Warre, 1st Baronet	297		
Whig	Thomas Baker	256		
Majority		41		

== Aftermath ==
Warre was returned in each of the following five elections, but in 1715, after being elected along with Portman, they were removed on petition. Claims of partiality on the part of the Mayor, acting as returning officer, in counting unqualified votes for the pair were upheld, and they were replaced by the Whig candidates that had stood against them.
