= James Lunnon (trade unionist) =

James Lunnon (1869–1952) was a British trade unionist and political activist.

Born in London, Lunnon's father died when he was six years old, and he began working, running errands for a grocer. He joined the National Secular Society in his youth. He later moved to the Liverpool area, and founded the Wallasey branch of the Independent Labour Party. In 1897, he moved to Norfolk, where he became a smallholder, and in 1910 he joined the National Agricultural Labourers' and Rural Workers' Union.

In 1913, Lunnon began working full-time for the Agricultural Labourers' Union, as its Western Counties organiser. He was largely successful in the role, and was promoted to National Organiser, then in 1919 was moved to the union's headquarters in London, where he was given the title of organising secretary. He also served on the union's executive committee for many years, and on the Agricultural Wages Board. His experience of the role led him away from secularism, and he became a Quaker.

Lunnon stood for the Labour Party in the 1921 Taunton by-election, and again in the 1935 United Kingdom general election, taking second place on each occasion. He was selected to contest Huntingdonshire in an election expected in 1939 or 1940, but no election was held until 1945, by which time he was no longer the candidate.

Around 1930, Lunnon retired to Ivinghoe, His son, also James Lunnon, became an artist and engineer in the United States.
