= 1754 Taunton by-election =

UK Parliamentary by-election

- 24 December 1754

Constituency of Taunton
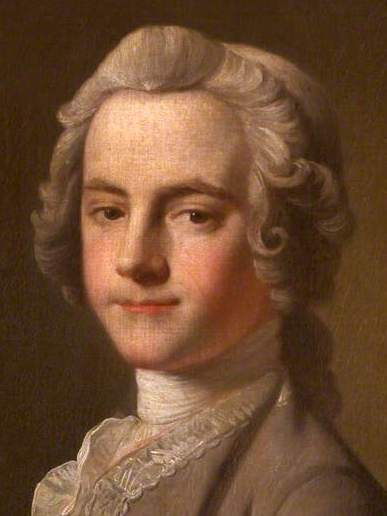
	Whig
Candidate	Robert Maxwell	Sir John Pole, Bt
Party	Whig	Tory
Popular vote	198	142
Percentage	58.2%	41.8%
MP before election
John Halliday
Whig
Subsequent MP
Robert Maxwell
Whig

The 1754 Taunton by-election to the Parliament of Great Britain was held across thirteen days, from 10 to 24 December 1754 in Taunton, the county town of the southwestern English county of Somerset. It took place following the death of the incumbent Whig Member of Parliament, John Halliday. The by-election was contested by Robert Maxwell on behalf of the Whigs, and Sir John Pole, 5th Baronet for the Tories. Maxwell was elected with a majority of 56. The election had over 700 rejected votes, and the result caused rioting in Taunton, during which two people were killed.

The election was fiercely contested, and both sides incurred great expenses during the campaign. There was not another contested election in Taunton for almost twenty years, and during that time the Taunton Market House Society was set up with the aim of preventing the bad blood of a contested election, and to spend money that would have otherwise been spent on campaigning on improving the town. Maxwell remained as one of Taunton's members of parliament until 1768.

== Background ==
=== Vacancy and nominations ===
In the mid-18th century, the parliamentary constituency of Taunton, which had an electorate of around 500, returned predominantly Whig members of parliament, partly due to an agreement between Charles Wyndham, 2nd Earl of Egremont and the local Dissenters; Lord Egremont, the chief landowner in the borough, would nominate a candidate for one of the two seats, while the Dissenters would name the second. Nationally, parliament had been controlled by the Whigs since 1715, in what was dubbed the "Whig Supremacy" by Basil Williams. At the 1754 general election, Lord Egremont put forward his brother-in-law, George Carpenter, 3rd Baron Carpenter, while the Dissenters nominated one of their own, John Halliday. The pair were elected unopposed. Two months after the election, on 8 June 1754, Halliday died, resulting in a by-election being called to fill the vacant seat.

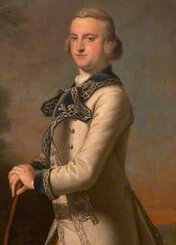
Sir John Pole, 5th Baronet, the candidate for the Tories

The Dissenters proposed Robert Webb, who had previously served as the member for Taunton from 1747 until the general election in 1754, to fill the vacancy. The recent history of the elections in Taunton suggested that no opposition would be offered: the last contested election had been in 1741. That however proved not to be the case, and a group of Tories put forward their own candidate, Sir John Pole, 5th Baronet of Shute in Devon. Webb did not want the expense of a contested election, and withdrew, leaving the Dissenters without a candidate. Unable to find a suitable candidate, the Dissenters appealed to Lord Egremont to locate someone to stand for the Whiggish interest. The Mayor, Henry Manly, was sent to London to meet with the Whig Prime Minister, Thomas Pelham-Holles, 1st Duke of Newcastle, to try and secure a candidate. Manly reported that the Duke of Newcastle did not want the seat to go to a Tory, and was willing to fund the election from the secret service account (more accurately the King's private money, a fund which was not accountable to Parliament). Eventually, through communication with both Lord Egremont and the Duke of Newcastle, Robert Maxwell came forward as the Whig candidate. Maxwell offered to spend up to £3,000 on the election, in addition to the money promised from the secret service fund.

=== Candidates ===
John Pole was the only son of Sir William Pole, 4th Baronet. The family owned the Shute House estate in east Devon, and had returned six generations of members of parliament, including John Pole's father. He had inherited the estate, and the baronetcy upon his father's death in 1741. Robert Maxwell was the oldest son of John Maxwell, 1st Baron Farnham, an Irish politician and peer. Robert had been a member of the Parliament of Ireland since 1743 for the constituency of Lisburn. He had not stood for the British parliament during the 1754 general election, though he was by that time almost certainly resident in England.

== Result ==
When Halliday died in June, parliament was in recess. As a result of this, a writ could not be issued until parliament reconvened in the winter. This extended the election campaign to run for six months, causing major disruption to the wool trade in the town. In his History of Taunton, Joshua Toulmin reported that the length of the campaigning allowed "the display of every manoeuvre, and the exertion of every power, by which the parties could counteract each other's views." A lot of money was spent on both sides of the election; in addition to the £3,000 which Maxwell said he was willing to spend, the government put forward £3,675 of secret service money for his campaign. (Note: Based on the inflation conversions compiled by the House of Commons Library, £6,675 in 1754 would be the equivalent of over £1.2 million in 2012.) Both men had plates and mugs made which were given free to the voters, generally full of food and drink. A number of delft plates bearing the inscription "Sir John Pole for ever" still exist, and one such plate sold for over £2,000 in 2011. A drinking glass with a similar inscription is housed at the British Museum in London. The public houses became aligned to one of the two candidates, and much of the campaign money was placed into these to gain their support. Toulmin lamented that "the houses of entertainment were kept open during all this time; [...] habits of idleness and licentiousness were formed." In a letter to Lord Sackville, Maxwell wrote that the election campaign involved "a great deal of smoking, some drinking, and kissing some hundreds of women."

Maxwell travelled down to Taunton in August to contest the seat, and the vacancy was nationally advertised in October. Despite this, the voting did not commence until 10 December 1754. The voting ran for thirteen days, and closed on 24 December; Maxwell received 198 votes to Pole's 142, giving Maxwell a majority of 56. During the course of the voting, over 700 votes were discounted, and it has been referred to as being "notoriously corrupt".

When the result was announced, the public showed "their displeasure by assaulting the friends of Mr Maxwell." Maxwell himself had to be escorted back to where he was staying, but during the rioting that ensued, the houses of those known to support Maxwell were attacked. The Derby Mercury reported that Robert Pearsall, a Dissenter minister who had been prominent in Maxwell's campaign, was threatened with having his house pulled down and being sacrificed. Two people, a man and a woman, were killed during the rioting, which prompted two troops of dragoons to be sent to the town, placed at the command of the Mayor, in case of emergency. One of the murderers was caught and sent to the County Jail in Ilchester, but the other escaped.

By-Election: Taunton
Party	Candidate	Votes	%	±%
Whig	Robert Maxwell	198	58.2	–
Tory	Sir John Pole, Bt	142	41.8	–
Majority		56		

== Aftermath ==
Maxwell, who became the 2nd Baron Farnham upon his father's death in 1759, and then Viscount Farnham in 1760, was returned unopposed at the 1761 general election. He pressed for a position in parliament, suggesting "being in the Admiralty or being paymaster of the pensions." However, this desire was only because he thought that such a position would provide a stepping stone to a higher peerage, and he was made the Earl of Farnham, in the Irish peerage in 1763. He initially stood at the general election in 1768, but withdrew from the election in the face of strong opposition.

The Market House Society was formed in Taunton in 1763 by a group who wished to avoid a repeat of the expensive and violent election in 1754. They made it their aim to "prevent the evils and drunkenness of a contested election", and vowed to spend the money that would have otherwise been spent on campaigning on improving Taunton. They put forward two candidates in 1768, who after the withdrawal of Maxwell and another, were returned unopposed for Taunton.

== Notes and references ==
Notes
