= Hanged, drawn and quartered =

Medieval punishment for high treason

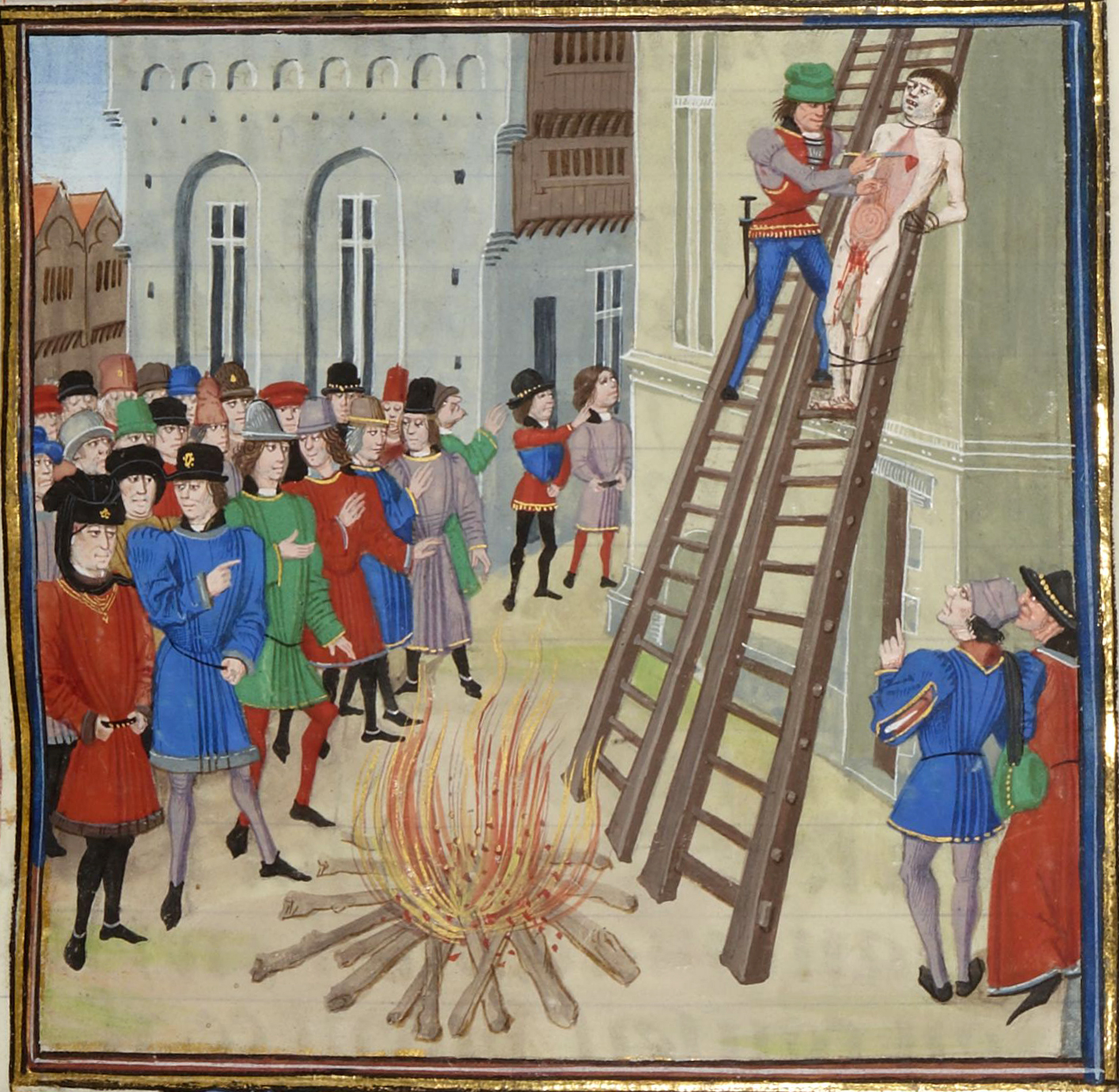
The execution of Hugh Despenser the Younger, as depicted in the Froissart of Louis of Gruuthuse

To be hanged, drawn and quartered was a method of capital punishment used principally to execute men convicted of high treason in late medieval and early modern Britain and Ireland. Convicted traitors were fastened by the feet to a hurdle, or wooden panel, and drawn behind a horse to the place of execution, where they were then hanged (almost to the point of death), emasculated, disembowelled, beheaded, and quartered. Their remains would then often be displayed in prominent places across the country, such as London Bridge, to serve as a warning of the fate of traitors. The punishment was only ever applied to men; for reasons of public decency, women convicted of high treason were instead burned at the stake.

It became a statutory punishment in the Kingdom of England for high treason in 1352 under King Edward III, although similar rituals are recorded during the reign of King Henry III. The same punishment applied to traitors against the king in Ireland from the 15th century onward; William Overy was hanged, drawn and quartered by Lord Lieutenant Richard Plantagenet, 3rd Duke of York in 1459, and from the reign of King Henry VII it was made part of statutory law. Matthew Lambert was among the most notable Irishmen to suffer this punishment, in 1581 in Wexford.

The severity of the sentence was measured against the seriousness of the crime. As an attack on the monarch's authority, high treason was considered a deplorable act demanding the most extreme form of punishment. Although some convicts had their sentences modified and suffered a less ignominious end, over a period of several hundred years many men found guilty of high treason were subjected to the law's ultimate sanction. They included many Catholic priests executed during the Elizabethan era, and several of the regicides involved in the 1649 execution of Charles I.

Although the Act of Parliament defining high treason remains on the United Kingdom's statute books, during a long period of 19th-century legal reform the sentence of hanging, drawing, and quartering was changed to drawing, hanging until dead, and posthumous beheading and quartering, before being abolished in England in 1870. The death penalty for treason was abolished in 1998.

== History ==
=== Early punishments for treason ===
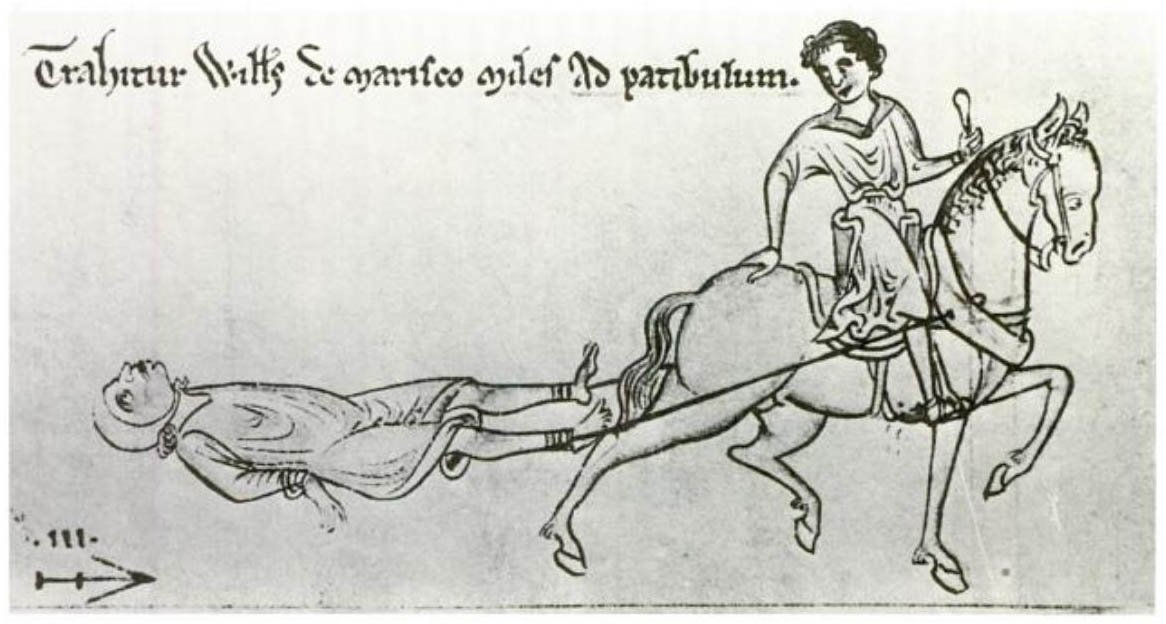
As illustrated in Matthew Paris's Chronica Majora, William de Marisco is drawn to his execution behind a horse.

During the High Middle Ages, those in the Kingdom of England found guilty of treason were punished in a variety of ways, often including drawing and hanging. Throughout the 13th century, more severe penalties were recorded, such as disembowelling, burning, beheading, and quartering.

The 13th-century English chronicler Matthew Paris described how in 1238 "a certain man at arms, a man of some education (armiger literatus)" attempted to kill King Henry III. His account records in detail how the would-be assassin was executed: "dragged asunder, then beheaded, and his body divided into three parts; each part was then dragged through one of the principal cities of England, and was afterwards hung on a gibbet used for robbers." (Note: "Rex eum, quasi regiae majestatis (occisorem), membratim laniatum equis apud Coventre, exemplum terribile et spectaculum comentabile praebere (iussit) omnibus audentibus talia machinari. Primo enim distractus, postea decollatus et corpus in tres partes divisum est.") He was apparently sent by William de Marisco, an outlaw who some years earlier had killed a man under royal protection before fleeing to Lundy Island. De Marisco was captured in 1242 and on Henry's order dragged from Westminster to the Tower of London to be executed. There he was hanged from a gibbet until dead. His corpse was disembowelled, his entrails burned, his body quartered, and the parts distributed to cities across the country.

=== First recorded examples ===
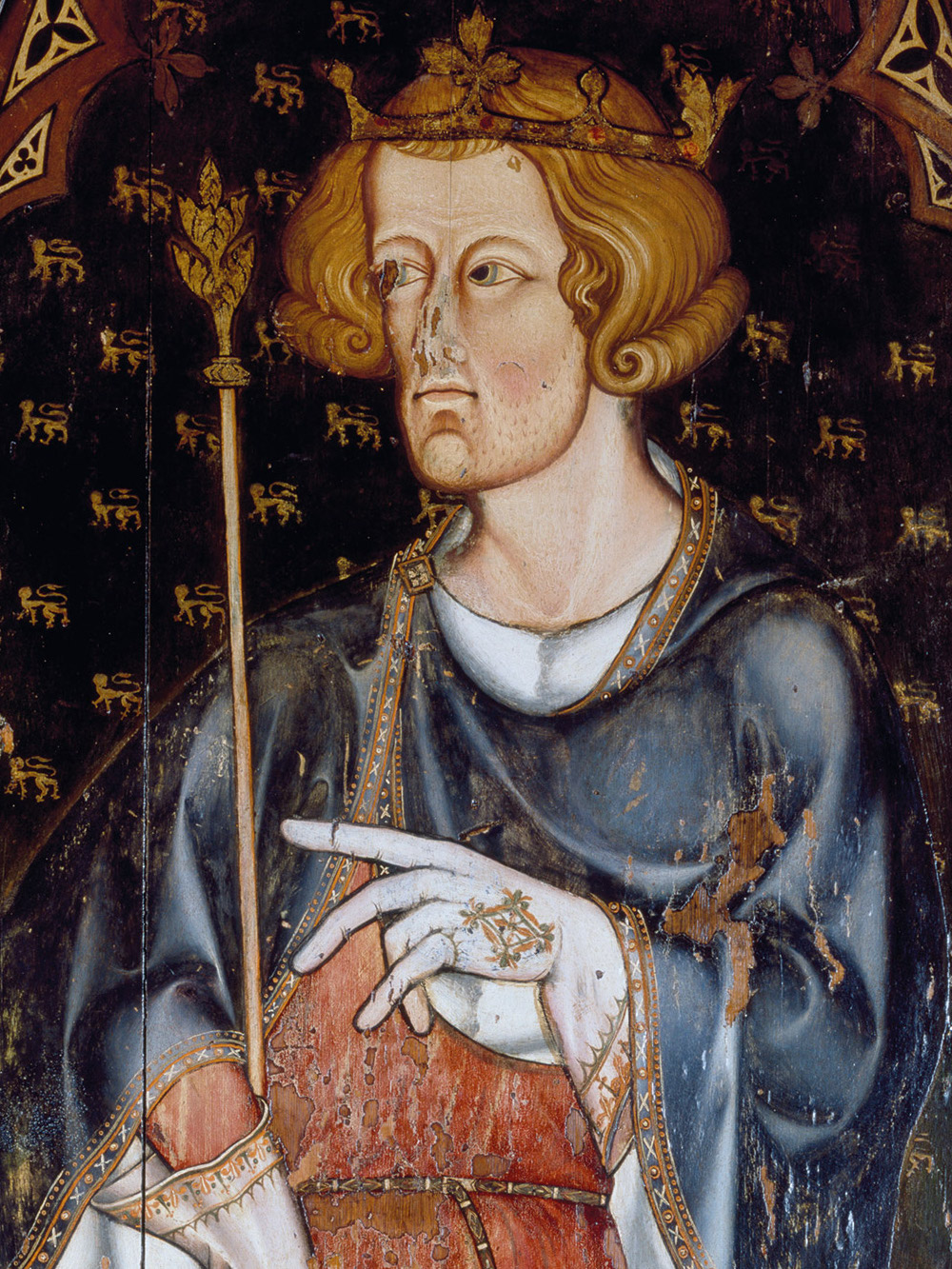
Edward I Longshanks, King of England (1272–1307)

The first recorded example of the punishment in its entirety was during Edward I's reign, for the Welsh prince Dafydd ap Gruffudd in 1283 after he turned against the king and proclaimed himself Prince of Wales and Lord of Snowdon. (Note: On de Marisco, Paris states "postea decollatus et corpus in tres partes divisum est" (Once beheaded his body was divided into three parts).) Following the capture of Dafydd ap Gruffudd, Edward proclaimed that the "treacherous lineage" (House of Aberffraw), and princes of that "turbulent nation" (Wales) were now his prisoners. Edward summoned a parliament at Shrewsbury to discuss Dafydd's fate. On 30 September, it was decided Dafydd would be executed for what from that time onward would be termed high treason.

On 3 October, Dafydd was attached to a horse's tail and drawn through the streets of Shrewsbury to his place of execution. There he was hanged for "killing English noblemen" until losing consciousness, then revived, disembowelled, and made to watch as his entrails burned before him for "sacrilege in committing his crimes in the week of Christ's passion" (Easter). Finally, Dafydd's body was cut into quarters "for plotting the king's death", and the parts were sent to different regions of Edward's realm: the right arm to York, the left arm to Bristol, the right leg to Northampton, and the left leg to Hereford. The head was bound with iron and set on a spear at the Tower of London.

In 1305, the Scottish knight Sir William Wallace, a primary leader of the First War of Scottish Independence, was punished in a similar manner. He was forced to wear a crown of laurel leaves and was drawn to Smithfield, where he was hanged, cut down before dying, emasculated and eviscerated, and then beheaded. His entrails were burned before him and his corpse quartered, while his head was set on London Bridge and the quarters sent to Newcastle, Berwick, Stirling, and Perth.

=== Treason Act 1351 ===
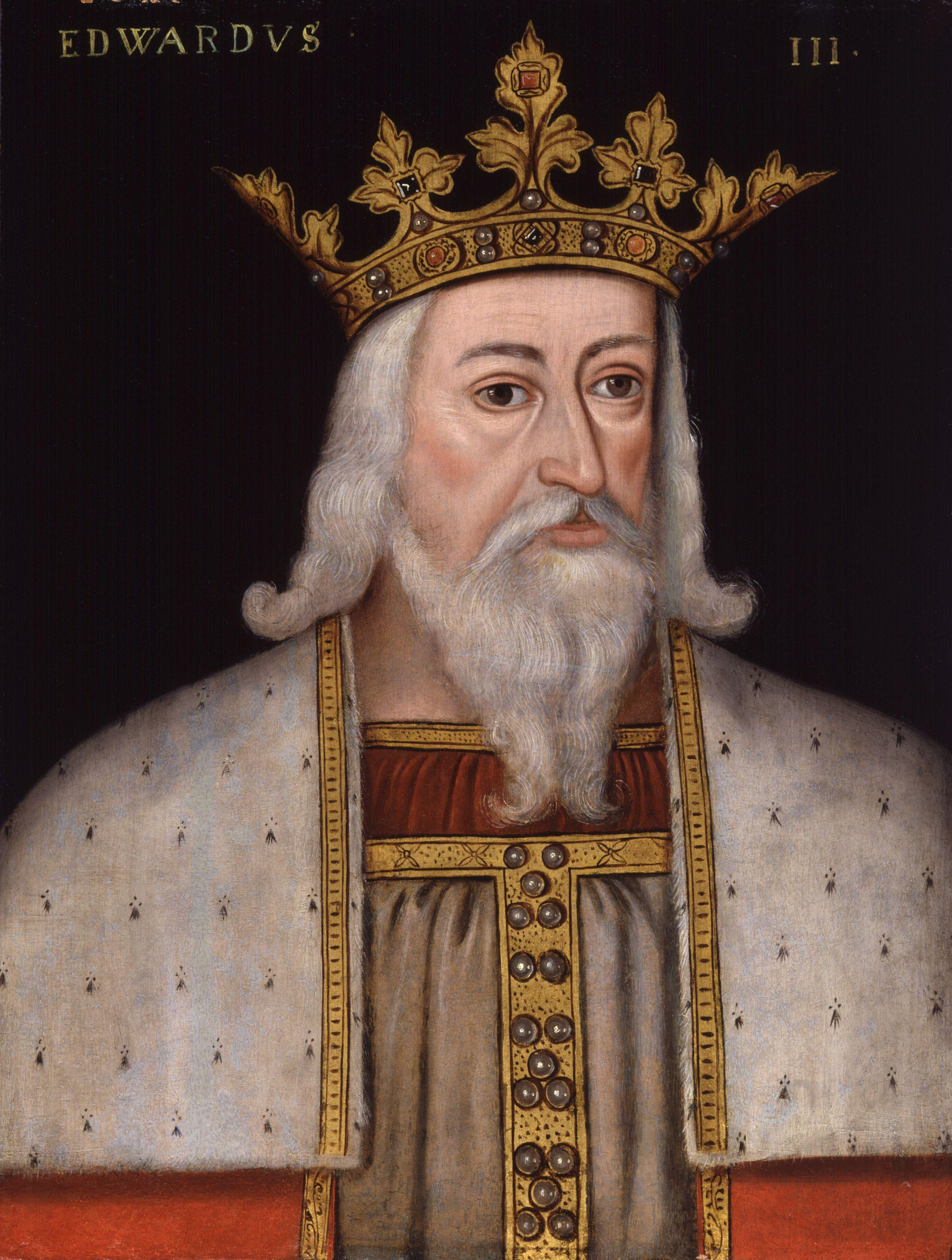
Edward III, under whose rule the Treason Act 1351 was enacted. It defined in law what constituted high treason.

These and other executions, such as those of Andrew Harclay, 1st Earl of Carlisle, and Hugh Despenser the Younger, which each occurred during Edward II's reign, happened when acts of treason in England, and their punishments, were not clearly defined in common law. (Note: Treason before 1351 was defined by Alfred the Great's Doom book. As Patrick Wormald wrote, "if anyone plots against the king's life ... [or his lord's life], he is liable for his life and all that he owns ... or to clear himself by the king's [lord's] wergeld.") Treason was based on allegiance owed to the sovereign from all subjects aged 14 or over, and it remained for the king and his judges to determine whether that allegiance had been broken. Edward III's justices had offered somewhat overzealous interpretations of what activities constituted treason, "calling felonies treasons and afforcing indictments by talk of accroachment of the royal power", prompting parliamentary demands to clarify the law. Edward therefore introduced the Treason Act 1351. It was enacted at a time in English history when a monarch's right to rule was indisputable and was therefore written principally to protect the throne and sovereign. The new law offered a narrower definition of treason than had existed before and split the old feudal offence into two classes. Petty treason referred to the killing of a master (or lord) by his servant, a husband by his wife, or a prelate by his clergyman. Men guilty of petty treason were drawn and hanged, whereas women were burned. (Note: Women were considered the legal property of their husbands, and so a woman convicted of killing her husband was guilty not of murder, but petty treason. For disrupting the social order a degree of retribution was therefore required; hanging was considered insufficient for such a heinous crime.)

High treason was the most egregious offence an individual could commit. Attempts to undermine the king's authority were viewed with as much seriousness as if the accused had attacked him personally, which itself would be an assault on his status as sovereign and a direct threat to his right to govern. As this might undermine the state, retribution was considered an absolute necessity and the crime deserving of the ultimate punishment. The practical difference between the two offences was therefore in the consequence of being convicted; rather than being drawn and hanged, men were to be hanged, drawn, and quartered, while for reasons of public decency (their anatomy being considered inappropriate for the sentence), women were instead drawn and burned.

The Act declared that a person had committed high treason if that person was:

- compassing or imagining the death of the king, his wife or his eldest son and heir;
- violating the king's wife, his eldest daughter if she were unmarried, or the wife of his eldest son and heir;
- levying war against the king in his realm;
- adhering to the king's enemies in his realm, giving them aid and comfort in his realm or elsewhere;
- counterfeiting the Great Seal or the Privy Seal, or the king's coinage;
- knowingly importing counterfeit money;
- killing the Chancellor, Treasurer or one of the king's Justices while performing their offices.

The Act did not limit the king's authority in defining the scope of treason. It contained a proviso giving English judges discretion to extend that scope whenever required, a process more commonly known as constructive treason. (Note: "And because that many other like cases of treason may happen in time to come, which a man cannot think nor declare at this present time; it is accorded, that if any other case supposed treason, which is not above specified, doth happen before any justice, the justice shall tarry without going to judgement of treason, till the cause be shewed and declared before the king and his parliament, whether it ought to be judged treason or other felony." Edward Coke) It also applied to subjects overseas in British colonies in the Americas, but the only documented incident of an individual there being hanged, drawn, and quartered was that of Joshua Tefft, an English colonist accused of having fought on the side of the Narragansett during the Great Swamp Fight. He was executed in January 1676. Later sentences resulted either in a pardon or a hanging.

=== Treason Act 1695 ===
Edward Stafford, 3rd Duke of Buckingham, was executed on 17 May 1521 for the crime of treason. The wording of his sentence has survived and indicates the precision with which the method of execution was described; he was to be "laid on a hurdle and so drawn to the place of execution, and there to be hanged, cut down alive, your members to be cut off and cast in the fire, your bowels burnt before you, your head smitten off, and your body quartered and divided at the King's will, and God have mercy on your soul."

The original 1351 Act required only one witness to convict a person of treason, although in 1547 this was increased to two. Suspects were first questioned in private by the Privy Council before they were publicly tried. They were allowed no witnesses or defence counsel, and were generally presumed guilty from the outset. This meant that for centuries anyone accused of treason was at a severe legal disadvantage, a situation that lasted until the late 17th century, when several years of politically motivated treason charges made against Whig politicians prompted the introduction of the Treason Act 1695. This allowed a defendant counsel, witnesses, a copy of the indictment, and a jury, and when not charged with an attempt on the monarch's life, to be prosecuted within three years of the alleged offence.

== Method ==
Once sentenced, malefactors were usually held in prison for a few days before being taken to the place of execution. During the High Middle Ages this journey may have been made tied directly to the back of a horse, but it subsequently became customary for the victim to be fastened instead to a wicker hurdle, or wooden panel, itself tied to the horse. Historian Frederic William Maitland thought that this was probably to "[secure] for the hangman a yet living body".

The use of the word "drawn", as in "to draw", has caused a degree of confusion. One of the Oxford English Dictionary's definitions of draw is "to draw out the viscera or intestines of; to disembowel (a fowl, etc. before cooking, a traitor or other criminal after hanging)", but this is followed by "in many cases of executions it is uncertain whether this, or [to drag (a criminal) at a horse's tail, or on a hurdle or the like, to the place of execution; formerly a legal punishment of high treason], is meant. The presumption is that where drawn is mentioned after hanged, the sense is as here." Historian Ram Sharan Sharma arrived at the same conclusion: "Where, as in the popular hung, drawn and quartered [use] (meaning facetiously, of a person, completely disposed of), drawn follows hanged or hung, it is to be referred to as the disembowelling of the traitor." Sharma is not the only historian to support this viewpoint as the phrase, "hanged until dead before being drawn and quartered", occurs in a number of relevant secondary publications. The historian and author Ian Mortimer disagrees, writing that the separate mention of evisceration is a relatively modern device, and that while it certainly took place on many occasions, the presumption that drawing means to disembowel is spurious. Instead, drawing (as a method of transportation) may be mentioned after hanging because it was a supplementary part of the execution.

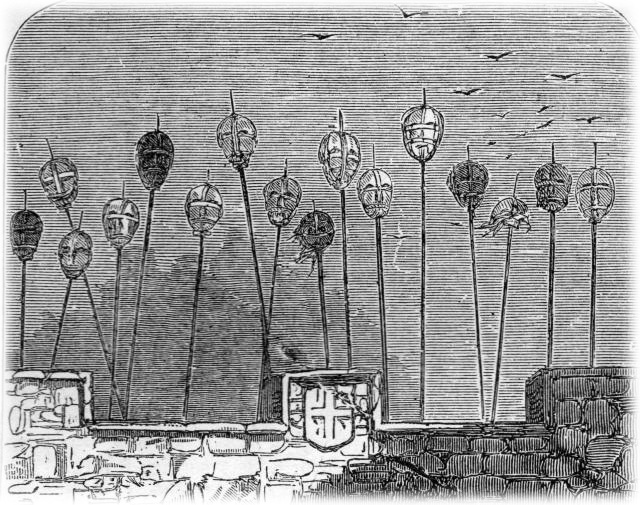
The spiked heads of executed criminals once adorned the gatehouse of the medieval London Bridge.

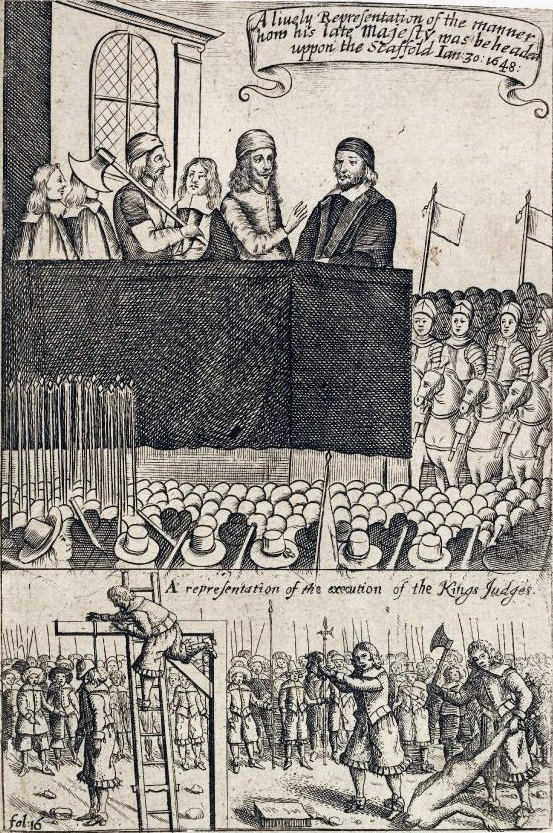
A liuely Representation of the manner how his late Majesty was beheaded uppon the Scaffold Ian 30: 1648; A representation of the execution of the King's Judges. In the top pane, Charles I is shown awaiting his execution. In the bottom pane, one regicide is hanged and another quartered, while the latter's head is shown to the crowd.

Some reports indicate that during Queen Mary I's reign bystanders were vocal in their support: while in transit, convicts sometimes suffered directly at the hands of the crowd. William Wallace was whipped, attacked and had rotten food and waste thrown at him, and the priest Thomas Pilchard was reportedly barely alive by the time he reached the gallows in 1587. Others found themselves admonished by "zealous and godly men"; it became customary for a preacher to follow the condemned, asking them to repent. According to Samuel Clarke, the Puritan clergyman William Perkins (1558–1602) once managed to convince a young man at the gallows that he had been forgiven, enabling the youth to go to his death "with tears of joy in his eyes ... as if he actually saw himself delivered from the hell which he feared before, and heaven opened for receiving his soul."

After the king's commission had been read aloud, the crowd was normally asked to move back from the scaffold before being addressed by the convict. While these speeches were mostly an admission of guilt (although few admitted treason), still they were carefully monitored by the sheriff and chaplain, who were occasionally forced to act; in 1588, Catholic priest William Dean's address to the crowd was considered so inappropriate that he was gagged almost to the point of suffocation. Questions on matters of allegiance and politics were sometimes put to the prisoner, as happened to Edmund Gennings in 1591. He was asked by priest hunter Richard Topcliffe to "confess his treason", but when Gennings responded "if to say Mass be treason, I confess to have done it and glory in it", Topcliffe ordered him to be quiet and instructed the hangman to push him off the ladder. Sometimes the witness responsible for the condemned man's execution was also present. A government spy, John Munday, was in 1582 present for the execution of Thomas Ford. Munday supported the sheriff, who had reminded the priest of his confession when he protested his innocence. The sentiments expressed in such speeches may be related to the conditions encountered during imprisonment. Many Jesuit priests suffered badly at the hands of their captors but were frequently the most defiant; conversely, those of a higher station were often the most apologetic. Such contrition may have arisen from the sheer terror felt by those who thought they might be disembowelled rather than simply beheaded as they would normally expect, and any apparent acceptance of their fate may have stemmed from the belief that a serious, but not treasonable act, had been committed. Good behaviour at the gallows may also have been due to a convict's desire for his heirs not to be disinherited.

The condemned were occasionally forced to watch as other traitors, sometimes their confederates, were executed before them. The priest James Bell was in 1584 made to watch as his companion, John Finch, was "a-quarter-inge". Edward James and Francis Edwardes were made to witness Ralph Crockett's execution in 1588, in an effort to elicit their co-operation and acceptance of Elizabeth I's religious supremacy before they were themselves executed. Normally stripped to the shirt with their arms bound in front of them, prisoners were then hanged for a short period, either from a ladder or cart. On the sheriff's orders the cart would be taken away (or if a ladder, turned), leaving the man suspended in mid-air. The aim was usually to cause strangulation and near-death, although some victims were killed prematurely, the priest John Payne's death in 1582 being hastened by a group of men pulling on his legs. Conversely, some, such as the deeply unpopular William Hacket (d. 1591), were cut down instantly and taken to be disembowelled and normally emasculated—the latter, according to Sir Edward Coke, to "show his issue was disinherited with corruption of blood." (Note: For an explanation of "corruption of blood", see Attainder.)

A victim still conscious at that point might have seen his entrails burned, before the body was decapitated and quartered (chopped into four pieces). The regicide Major General Thomas Harrison, after being hanged for several minutes and then cut open in October 1660, was reported to have leaned across and hit his executioner—resulting in the swift removal of his head. His entrails were thrown onto a nearby fire. (Note: Harrison's sentence was "That you be led to the place from whence you came, and from thence be drawn upon a hurdle to the place of execution, and then you shall be hanged by the neck and, being alive, shall be cut down, and your privy members to be cut off, and your entrails be taken out of your body and, you living, the same to be burnt before your eyes, and your head to be cut off, your body to be divided into four-quarters, and head and quarters to be disposed of at the pleasure of the King's majesty. And the Lord have mercy on your soul." His head adorned the sledge that drew fellow regicide John Cooke to his execution, before being displayed in Westminster Hall; his quarters were fastened to the city gates.) John Houghton was reported to have prayed while being disembowelled in 1535, and in his final moments to have cried "Good Jesu, what will you do with my heart?"

Executioners were often inexperienced and proceedings did not always run smoothly. In 1584, Richard White's executioner removed his bowels piece by piece, through a small hole in his belly, "the which device taking no good success, he mangled his breast with a butcher's axe to the very chine most pitifully." (Note: In the case of Hugh Despenser the Younger, Seymour Phillips writes: "All the good people of the realm, great and small, rich and poor, regarded Despenser as a traitor and a robber; for which he was sentenced to be hanged. As a traitor he was to be drawn and quartered and the quarters distributed around the kingdom; as an outlaw he was to be beheaded; and for procuring discord between the king and the queen and other people of the kingdom he was sentenced to be disembowelled and his entrails burned; finally he was declared to be a traitor, tyrant and renegade." In Professor Robert Kastenbaum's opinion the disfigurement of Despenser's corpse (presuming that his disembowelment was post-mortem) may have served as a reminder to the crowd that the authorities did not tolerate dissent. He speculates that the reasoning behind such bloody displays may have been to assuage the crowd's anger, to remove any human characteristics from the corpse, to rob the criminal's family of any opportunity to hold a meaningful funeral, or even to release any evil spirits contained within. The practice of disembowelling the body may have originated in the medieval belief that treasonable thoughts were housed there, requiring that the convict's entrails be "purged by fire". Andrew Harclay's "treasonous thoughts had originated in his 'heart, bowels, and entrails'", and so were to be "extracted and burnt to ashes, which would then be dispersed", as had happened with William Wallace and Gilbert de Middleton.) At his execution in January 1606 for his involvement in the Gunpowder Plot, Guy Fawkes managed to break his neck by jumping from the gallows.

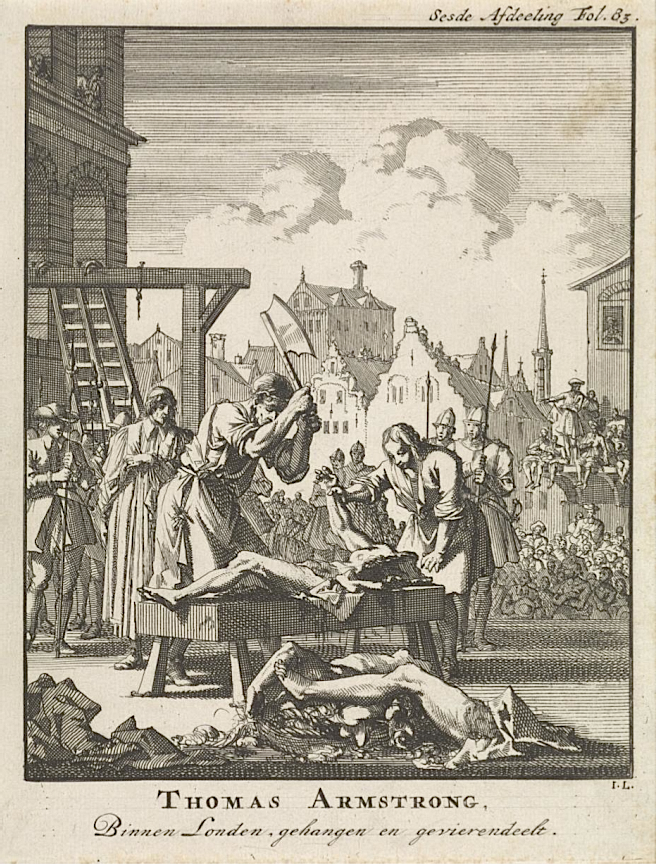
Engraving of the execution of Sir Thomas Armstrong

No records exist to demonstrate exactly how the corpse was quartered, although an engraving of the quartering of Sir Thomas Armstrong in 1684 shows the executioner making vertical cuts through the spine and removing the legs at the hip. The distribution of Dafydd ap Gruffudd's remains was described by Herbert Maxwell: "the right arm with a ring on the finger in York; the left arm in Bristol; the right leg and hip at Northampton; the left [leg] at Hereford. But the villain's head was bound with iron, lest it should fall to pieces from putrefaction, and set conspicuously upon a long spear-shaft for the mockery of London." After the execution in 1660 of several of the regicides involved in the death of King Charles I eleven years earlier, the diarist John Evelyn remarked: "I saw not their execution, but met their quarters, mangled, and cut, and reeking, as they were brought from the gallows in baskets on the hurdle." Such remains were typically parboiled and displayed as a gruesome reminder of the penalty for high treason, usually wherever the traitor had conspired or found support. Salt and cumin seed would be added during the boiling process: the salt to prevent putrefaction, and the cumin seed to prevent birds pecking at the flesh.

The head was often displayed on London Bridge, for centuries the route by which many travellers from the south entered the city. Several eminent commentators remarked on the displays. In 1566 Joseph Justus Scaliger wrote that "in London there were many heads on the bridge ... I have seen there, as if they were masts of ships, and at the top of them, quarters of men's corpses." In 1602 the Duke of Pommerania-Stettin emphasised the ominous nature of their presence when he wrote "near the end of the bridge, on the suburb side, were stuck up the heads of thirty gentlemen of high standing who had been beheaded on account of treason and secret practices against the Queen." (Note: In 1534, a woman's head adorned the bridge; Elizabeth Barton, a domestic servant and later nun who forecast the early death of Henry VIII, was drawn to Tyburn, and hanged and beheaded.) The practice of using London Bridge in this manner ended following the hanging, drawing, and quartering in 1678 of William Staley, a victim of the fictitious Popish Plot. His quarters were given to his relatives, who promptly arranged a "grand" funeral; this incensed the coroner so much that he ordered the body to be dug up and set upon the city gates. Staley's was the last head to be placed on London Bridge.

== Later history ==
Another victim of the Popish Plot, Oliver Plunkett, the Archbishop of Armagh, was hanged, drawn, and quartered at Tyburn in July 1681. His executioner was bribed so that Plunkett's body parts were saved from the fire; the head is now displayed at St Peter's Church in Drogheda. Francis Towneley and several other captured Jacobite officers involved in the Jacobite Rising of 1745 were executed, but by then the executioner possessed some discretion as to how much they should suffer and thus they were killed before their bodies were eviscerated. The French spy François Henri de la Motte was hanged in 1781 for almost an hour before his heart was cut out and burned, and the following year David Tyrie was hanged, decapitated, and then quartered at Portsmouth, being the last person to be executed with this method. Pieces of his corpse were fought over by members of the 20,000-strong crowd there, some making trophies of his limbs and fingers. In 1803 Edward Despard and six co-conspirators in the Despard Plot were sentenced to be hanged, drawn, and quartered. Before they were hanged and beheaded at Horsemonger Lane Gaol, they were first placed on sledges attached to horses, and ritually pulled in circuits around the gaol yards. Their execution was attended by an audience of about 20,000. A contemporary report describes the scene after Despard had made his speech:

This energetic, but inflammatory appeal, was followed by such enthusiastic plaudits, that the Sheriff hinted to the Clergyman to withdraw, and forbade Colonel Despard to proceed. The cap was then drawn over their eyes, during which the Colonel was observed again to fix the knot under his left ear, and, at seven minutes before nine o'clock the signal being given, the platform dropped, and they were all launched into eternity. From the precaution taken by the Colonel, he appeared to suffer very little, neither did the others struggle much, except Broughton, who had been the most indecently profane of the whole. Wood, the soldier, died very hard. The Executioners went under, and kept pulling them by the feet. Several drops of blood fell from the fingers of Macnamara and Wood, during the time they were suspended. After hanging thirty-seven minutes, the Colonel's body was cut down, at half an hour past nine o'clock, and being stripped of his coat and waistcoat, it was laid upon saw-dust, with the head reclined upon a block. A surgeon then in attempting to sever the head from the body by a common dissecting knife, missed the particular joint aimed at, when he kept haggling it, till the executioner was obliged to take the head between his hands, and to twist it several times round, when it was with difficulty severed from the body. It was then held up by the executioner, who exclaimed—"Behold the head of EDWARD MARCUS DESPARD, a Traitor!" The same ceremony followed with the others respectively; and the whole concluded by ten o'clock.

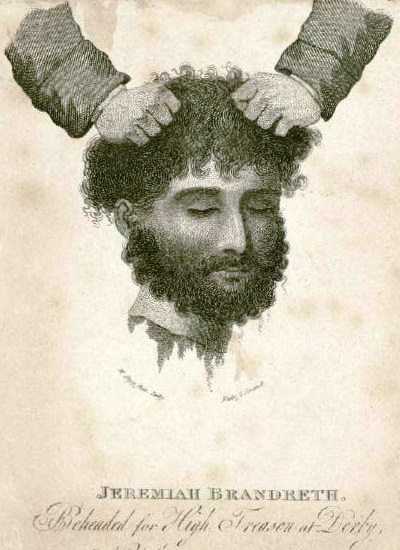
The severed head of Jeremiah Brandreth, one of the last men in England sentenced to be hanged, drawn, and quartered

At the burnings of Isabella Condon in 1779 and Phoebe Harris in 1786, the sheriffs present inflated their expenses; in the opinion of Simon Devereaux they were probably dismayed at being forced to attend such spectacles. Harris's fate prompted William Wilberforce to sponsor a bill which if passed would have abolished the practice, but as one of its proposals would have allowed the anatomical dissection of criminals other than murderers, the House of Lords rejected it. The burning in 1789 of Catherine Murphy, a counterfeiter, (Note: Although women were usually burned only after they had first been strangled to death, in 1726 Catherine Hayes's executioner botched the job and she perished in the flames, the last woman in England to do so.) was impugned in Parliament by Sir Benjamin Hammett. He called it one of "the savage remains of Norman policy". Amidst a growing tide of public disgust at the burning of women, Parliament passed the Treason Act 1790, which for women guilty of treason substituted hanging for burning. It was followed by the Treason Act 1814, introduced by Samuel Romilly, a legal reformer. Influenced by his friend, Jeremy Bentham, Romilly had long argued that punitive laws should serve to reform criminal behaviour and that far from acting as a deterrent, the severity of England's laws was responsible for an increase in crime. When appointed the MP for Queensborough in 1806 he resolved to improve what he described as "Our sanguinary and barbarous penal code, written in blood". He managed to repeal the death penalty for certain thefts and vagrancy, and in 1814 proposed to change the sentence for men guilty of treason to being hanged until dead and the body left at the king's disposal. However, when it was pointed out that this would be a less severe punishment than that given for murder, he agreed that the corpse should also be decapitated, "as a fit punishment and appropriate stigma." This is what happened to Jeremiah Brandreth, leader of a 100-strong contingent of men in the Pentrich rising and one of three men executed in 1817 at Derby Gaol. As with Edward Despard and his confederates the three were drawn to the scaffold on sledges before being hanged for about an hour, and then on the insistence of the Prince Regent were beheaded with an axe. The local miner appointed to the task of beheading them was inexperienced though, and having failed with the first two blows, completed his job with a knife. As he held the first head up and made the customary announcement, the crowd reacted with horror and fled. A different reaction was seen in 1820, when amidst more social unrest five men involved in the Cato Street Conspiracy were hanged and beheaded at Newgate Prison. Although the beheading was performed by a surgeon, following the usual proclamation the crowd was angry enough to force the executioners to find safety behind the prison walls. The plot was the last crime for which the sentence was applied.

Reformation of England's capital punishment laws continued throughout the 19th century, as politicians such as John Russell, 1st Earl Russell, sought to remove from the statute books many of the capital offences that remained. Robert Peel's drive to ameliorate law enforcement saw petty treason abolished by the Offences against the Person Act 1828, which removed the distinction between crimes formerly considered as petty treason, and murder. The Royal Commission on Capital Punishment 1864–1866 recommended that there be no change to treason law, quoting the "more merciful" Treason Felony Act 1848, which limited the punishment for most treasonous acts to penal servitude. Its report recommended that for "rebellion, assassination or other violence ...we are of opinion that the extreme penalty must remain", although the most recent occasion (and ultimately, the last) on which anyone had been sentenced to be hanged, drawn, and quartered was in November 1839, following the Chartist Newport Rising—and those men sentenced to death were instead transported. The report highlighted the changing public mood toward public executions. Home Secretary Spencer Horatio Walpole told the commission that executions had "become so demoralizing that, instead of its having a good effect, it has a tendency rather to brutalize the public mind than to deter the criminal class from committing crime". The commission recommended that executions should be performed privately, behind prison walls and away from the public's view, "under such regulations as may be considered necessary to prevent abuse, and to satisfy the public that the law has been complied with." The practice of executing murderers in public was ended two years later by the Capital Punishment Amendment Act 1868, introduced by Home Secretary Gathorne Hardy, but this did not apply to traitors. An amendment to abolish capital punishment completely, suggested before the bill's third reading, failed by 127 votes to 23.

Hanging, drawing, and quartering was abolished in England by the Forfeiture Act 1870, Liberal politician Charles Forster's second attempt since 1864 (Note: Forster's first attempt passed through both Houses of Parliament without obstruction, but was dropped following a change of government.) to end the forfeiture of a felon's lands and goods (thereby not making paupers of his family). The Act limited the penalty for treason to hanging alone, although it did not remove the monarch's right under the 1814 Act to replace hanging with beheading. Beheading was abolished in 1973, although it had long been obsolete; the last person on British soil to be beheaded was Simon Fraser, 11th Lord Lovat in 1747. The death penalty for treason was abolished by the Crime and Disorder Act 1998, enabling the UK to ratify protocol six of the European Convention on Human Rights in 1999.

== In the United States ==
After King Philip's War in 1676, the General Court of Massachusetts Bay sentenced Rhode Island man Joshua Tefft to be hanged, drawn, and quartered for fighting alongside the Narragansett Indians against the New England Colonies. The sentence was carried out in an army camp on January 18, 1676.

In 1683, New Hampshire Governor Edward Cranfield charged Edward Gove with treason in the aftermath of Gove's Rebellion. Gove was convicted and sent to the Tower of London to await execution. However, his sentence was commuted by King James II.

In some of the places where the American War of Independence developed into a fierce civil war among American factions, there are recorded cases of both sides hanging, drawing, and quartering people – both Loyalists and Patriots finding reasons to construe their opponents as being "traitors" deserving of such a fate.

== See also ==
- Dismemberment
- List of people hanged, drawn and quartered
