= Catherine Hayes (murderer) =

English murderer

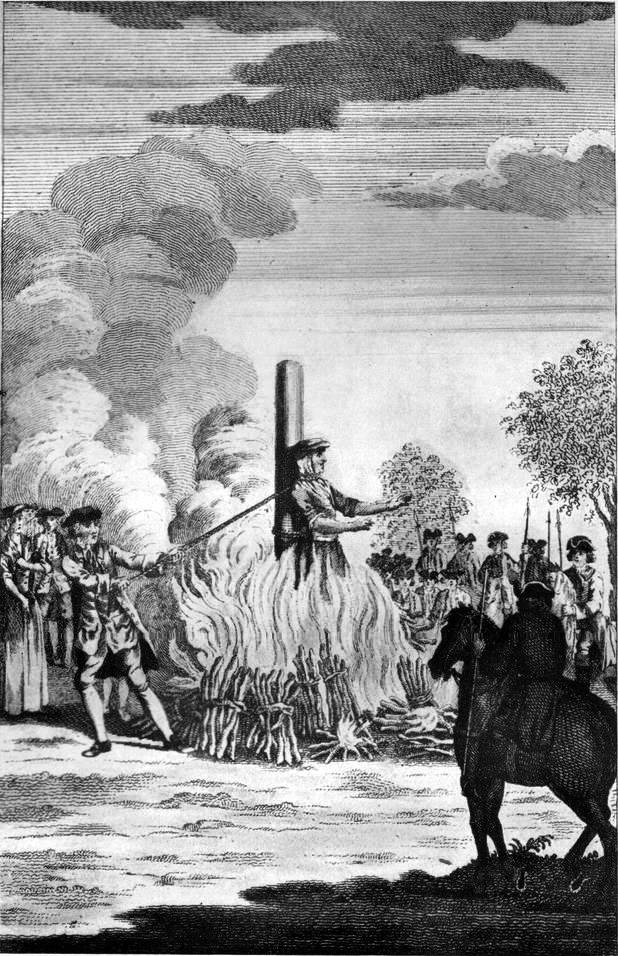
Contemporary illustration of Catherine Hayes being burned at the stake

Catherine Hayes (1690 – 9 May 1726), sometimes spelled Catharine Hayes, was an English woman who was burned at the stake for committing petty treason by killing her husband.

== Early life and marriage ==
Catherine Hall was born near Birmingham in 1690 to poor parents. At 16 she obtained employment as a servant in the household of a Warwickshire farmer named Hayes. The son of this household was 21-year-old John Hayes, a carpenter who soon fell in love with her. Within a year of their acquaintance, the two were married.

Several years into their marriage, the couple moved to London and set up a small shop in Oxford Road, Tyburn, while renting lodgings. Hayes also became a successful pawnbroker, and his wife would bear 12 children. Catherine would later claim that her husband was abusive, kept her isolated from church, and murdered their newborn children.

== Murder ==
Toward the end of 1725, two men named Thomas Wood and Thomas Billings (the latter the couple's biological son, adopted out) lodged with the couple. Having been promiscuous since her mid-teens, Hayes began conducting affairs with both men, and the trio soon decided to kill John Hayes. On 1 March 1726, they persuaded him to partake in a drinking contest, then killed him once he was intoxicated. The trio then dismembered Hayes' body, subsequently discarding many of his body parts in a pond at Marylebone. The head was cast into the River Thames and was found the next day. It was displayed in the churchyard of St Margaret's, Westminster, for several days, which resulted in John Hayes being identified.

On 24 March, the trunk and limbs were discovered. Catherine Hayes and Billings had meanwhile been arrested on a warrant. Wood was captured shortly afterwards and confessed. Billings then admitted his complicity, but Hayes denied all knowledge of the murder. At the trial, Hayes pleaded 'not guilty', but was convicted of petty treason, and sentenced to be burned at the stake. Wood and Billings were sentenced to be hanged, though Wood died in prison before the sentence could be carried out. The case excited much popular attention, and many noblemen and gentlemen attended the trial.

== Execution ==
Before 9 May, the day fixed for the execution, Wood died in Newgate Prison. Hayes unsuccessfully tried to poison herself. On 9 May, she was tied to a stake at Tyburn with a halter affixed round her neck. After 1652, it was the practice in these cases to strangle the condemned woman on a low gibbet before covering her with faggots and setting the stake alight; however, the execution of Hayes was to be botched.

One early report stated that "the executioner was foiled in an endeavour to strangle her by the burning of the rope, and the woman was finally killed by a piece of wood which was thrown at her head and dashed out her brains".

Later it was stated that Hayes was "the last woman in England to be burnt alive for petty treason (though the burning of women's bodies after execution continued until 1790)". Billings was hanged in chains in Marylebone Fields.

Ballads were written about Hayes's crime, and a correspondent of the London Journal compared the murder of John Hayes to the play Arden of Feversham. William Makepeace Thackeray based his story of Catherine, which first appeared in Fraser's Magazine 1839–40, on the career of Catherine Hayes.

== In popular culture ==
The story of John and Catherine Hayes was told in the 28 October 1953 episode of the CBS radio series Crime Classics entitled "John Hayes, His Head, and How They Were Parted." Catherine Hayes was portrayed by Betty Harford, while John Hayes was played by Alistair Duncan.
