= Treason by Women Act (Ireland) 1796 =

Act of the Parliament of Ireland

Treason by Women Act (Ireland) 1796 (Note: Short title given by Short Titles Act (Northern Ireland) 1951 (c. 1 (N.I.)))
- Act of Parliament
- Parliament of Ireland
- Long title: An Act for discontinuing the Judgment which has been required by Law to be given against Women convicted of certain crimes, and substituting another judgment in lieu thereof.
- Citation: 36 Geo. 3. c. 31 (I)
- Territorial extent: Ireland

Dates
- Royal assent: 15 April 1796
- Commencement: 15 April 1796 (Note: The Acts of Parliament (Commencement) Act (Ireland) 1795.)
- Repealed: Republic of Ireland: 24 November 1962; Northern Ireland: 30 September 1998 (Note: The Crime and Disorder Act 1998 (Commencement No. 2 and Transitional Provisions) Order 1998 (SI 1998/2327).)

Other legislation
- Amended by: Offences Against the Person (Ireland) Act 1829; Statute Law Revision (Ireland) Act 1879; Statute Law Revision Act 1953
- Repealed by: Republic of Ireland: Statute Law Revision (Pre-Union Irish Statutes) Act 1962; Northern Ireland: Crime and Disorder Act 1998
- Relates to: Treason Act 1790

Status: Repealed

Text of statute as originally enacted

The Treason by Women Act (Ireland) 1796 (36 Geo. 3. c. 31 (I)) was an act of the Parliament of the Kingdom of Ireland which reduced the penalty for women convicted of high treason and petty treason from death by burning to death by hanging. It was the Irish equivalent of the Treason Act 1790 (30 Geo. 3. c. 48) passed by the Parliament of Great Britain.

== Subsequent developments ==
In the Republic of Ireland, the act was explicitly repealed by the Statute Law Revision (Pre-Union Irish Statutes) Act 1962.

In Northern Ireland, the short title was assigned in 1951.

Section 4 of the act, so far as unrepealed, was repealed by section 2 of, and the second schedule to, the Statute Law Revision Act 1953 (2 & 3 Eliz. 2. c. 5), which came into force on 18 December 1953.

The whole act was repealed by section 36(3)(a) and section 120(2) of, and schedule 10 to the Crime and Disorder Act 1998, which came into force on 30 September 1998. The 1998 act abolished the death penalty for treason.

== See also ==
- Treason Act
