= Elizabeth Broadingham =

British murderer, burned at the stake

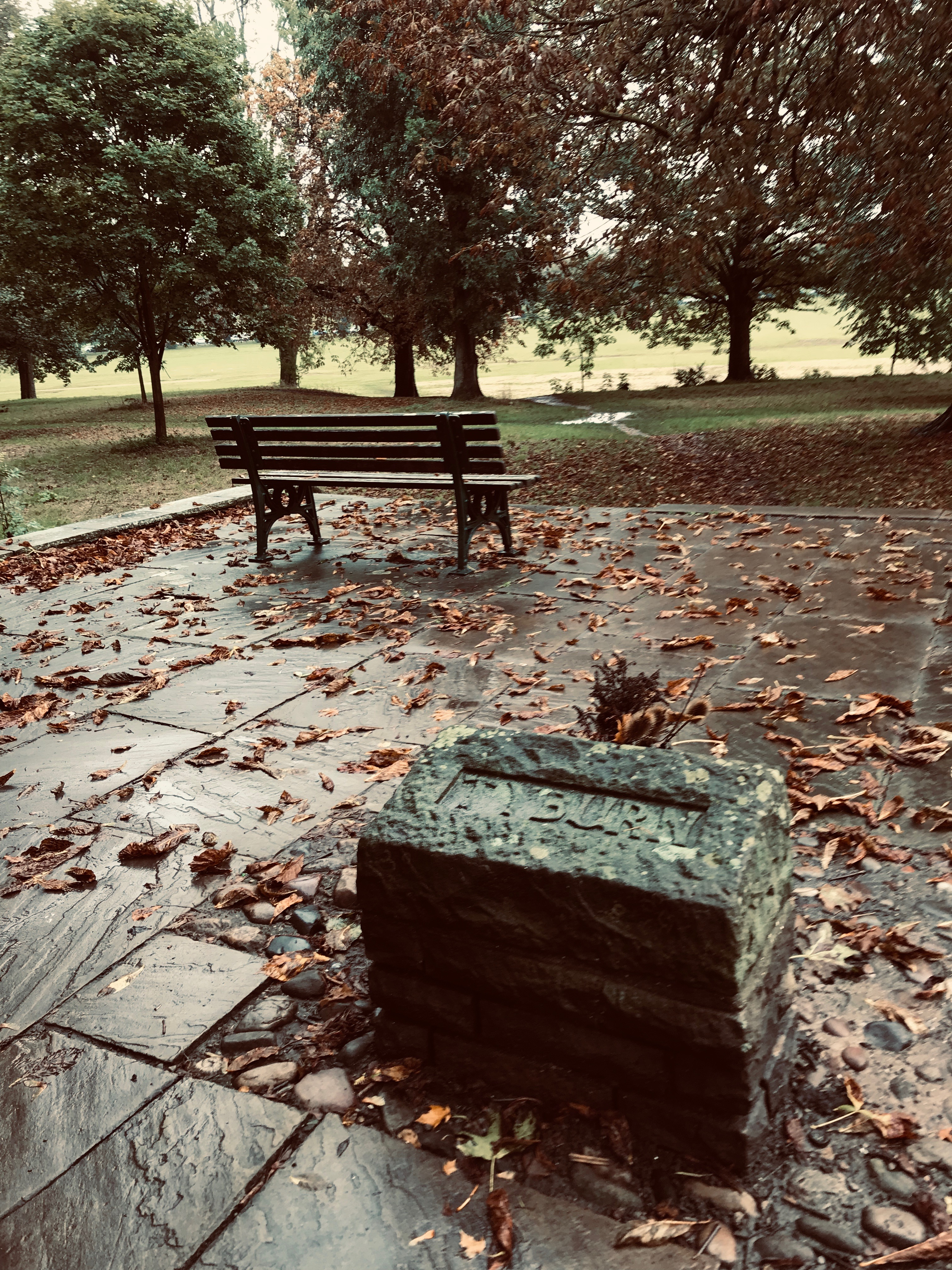
- She died at York's Tyburn at Knavesmire
- Died: 20 March 1776; Knavesmire
- Known for: one of the last women to be burned at the stake
- Spouse: John Broadingham
- Partner: Thomas Aikney

Elizabeth Broadingham (died 20 March 1776) was a British murderer. She was executed in 1776 with her lover for the murder of her husband in York. Her husband was considered to be her social superior so she was one of the last women to be burned at the stake (after being killed).

== Life ==
Broadingham's early life is unrecorded. She was living with her husband, John Broadingham, in Flamborough when he was convicted for smuggling. While he was serving his sentence she started an adulterous relationship with a man called Thomas Aikney. John Broadingham completed his sentence, but by this time his wife was living with Thomas Aikney in Lincolnshire.

According to later accounts it was Elizabeth who initially proposed that her husband should be murdered. She was said to have repeated this proposal to her lover, particularly when he was inebriated. Thomas eventually agreed. Elizabeth was said to have pretended that she was reconciled with her husband and she moved back into their home. A week or so later on 13 February 1776 Thomas was said to have knocked at the door. Elizabeth woke her husband to tell him and he went to the door to investigate. John was attacked and died with a wound on his leg and a wound so deep in his abdomen that the knife was left in the wound. John made it away but with his bowels visible, he died on the following day.

Elizabeth and Thomas were arrested and tried and both were sentenced to death even though Elizabeth was just an accomplice. The key evidence was the knife which was identified as belonging to Thomas. Elizabeth was convicted of killing her social superior making the crime not murder but petty treason. For this reason she was not only strangled on 20 March but her body was burned at the stake at a place called Tyburn in York. Thomas died too and his body was sent to Leeds for dissection.

== Death and legacy ==
She was executed in 1776 with her lover for the murder of her husband in York. She was one of the last women to be burned at the stake (after being killed). She is regarded as infamous.

The place where she and several other notable people died is Tyburn in York.
