= William Rowley (Royal Navy officer) =

British Royal Navy officer and politician (c. 1690–1768)

Admiral of the Fleet Sir William Rowley KB
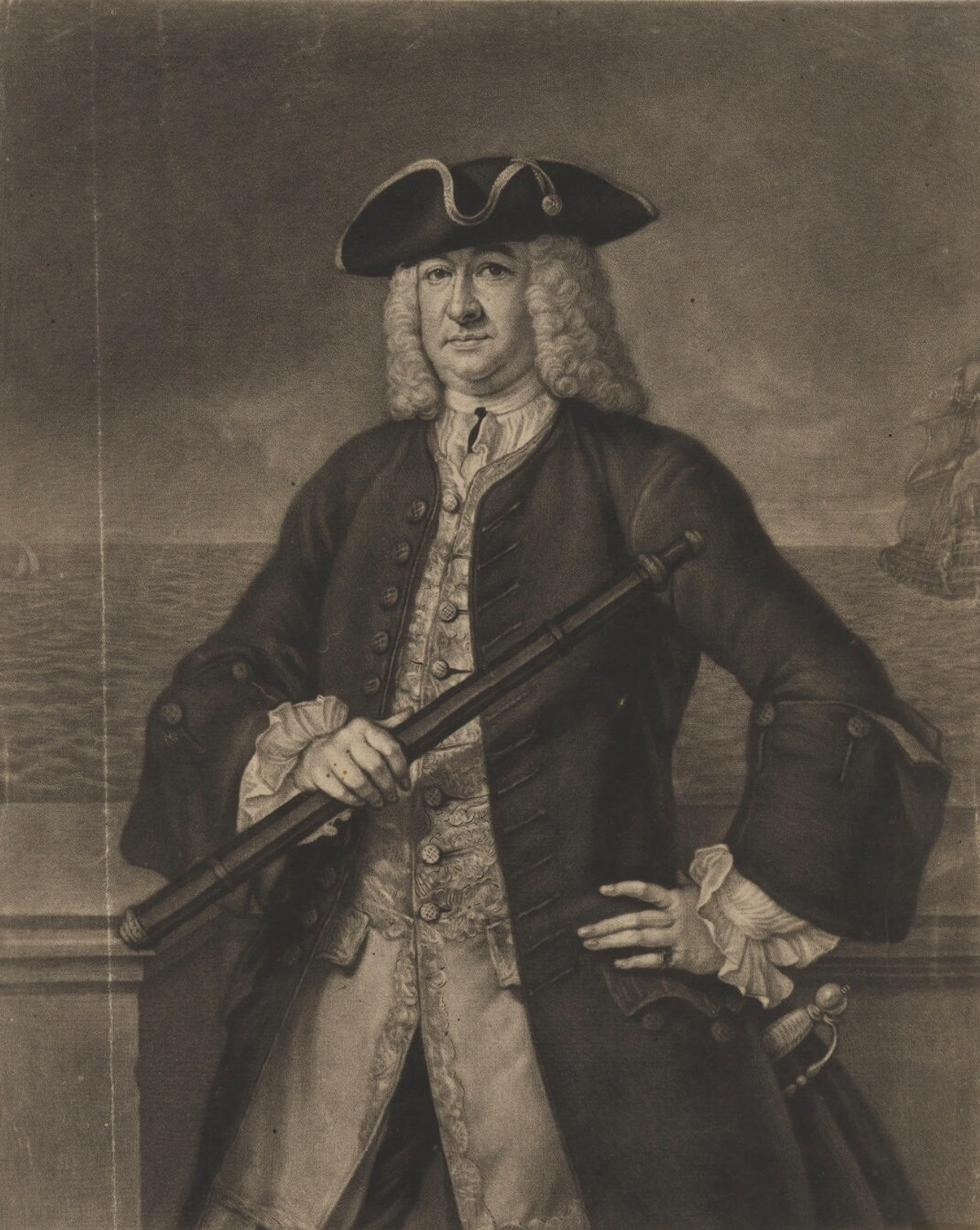
- Engraving by John Faber the Younger after a Claude Arnulphy portrait, 1745
- Born: 1690
- Died: 1 January 1768 (aged 77–78)
- Burial place: St Mary's Church, Stoke-by-Nayland
- Military career
- Allegiance: England; Great Britain
- Branch: Royal Navy
- Service years: 1704–1768
- Rank: Admiral of the Fleet
- Commands: HMS Bideford; HMS Lively; HMS Barfleur; Mediterranean Fleet
- Conflicts: War of the Spanish Succession; War of the Austrian Succession; Battle of Toulon (1744)
- Awards: Knight of the Order of the Bath

Admiral of the Fleet Sir William Rowley KB (c. 1690 – 1 January 1768) was a Royal Navy officer and politician. He distinguished himself by his determination as commander of the vanguard at the Battle of Toulon in February 1744 during the War of the Austrian Succession. He went on to be Commander-in-Chief of the Mediterranean Fleet in August 1744 and successfully kept the Spanish and French fleets out of the Mediterranean area but was relieved of his command following criticism of his decision as presiding officer at a court-martial. Rowley later became a Lord Commissioner of the Admiralty on the Board of Admiralty. He was a Member of Parliament for Taunton and then for Portsmouth.

== Early career ==
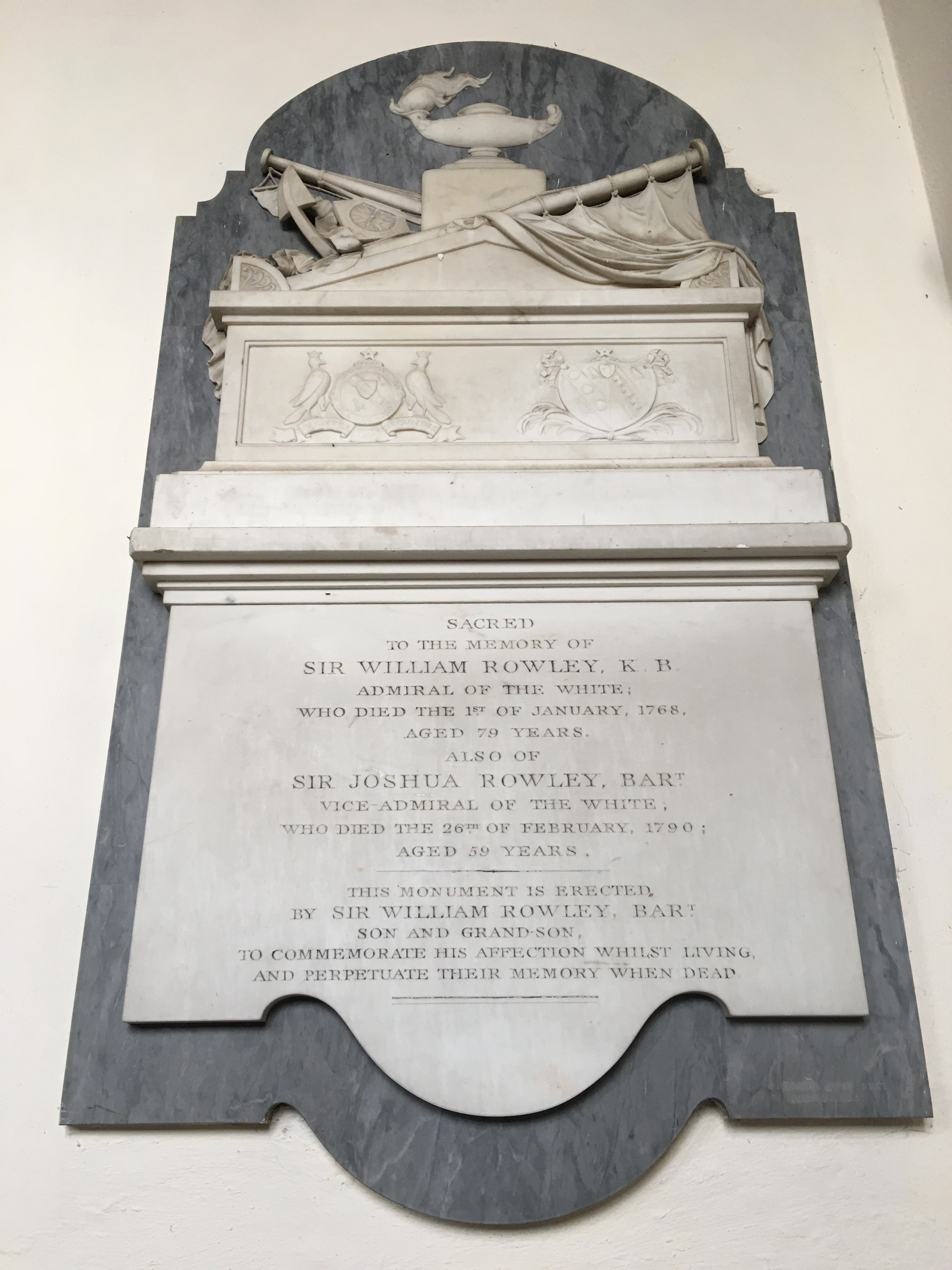
Memorial to Rowley in St Mary's Church, Stoke-by-Nayland

Born the second son of William Rowley and his wife, Elizabeth Rowley (née Baldwin), Rowley joined the Royal Navy as a volunteer in 1704. He was assigned to the third-rate HMS Orford, commanded by Captain John Norris, and saw action in the Mediterranean during the War of the Spanish Succession. Having passed his exams for lieutenant on 15 September 1708, he transferred to the third-rate HMS Somerset in December 1708. After carrying out diplomatic duties for King George I in Paris in early 1716, he was promoted to captain on 26 June 1716 and given command of HMS Bideford at Gibraltar and was involved in naval action against pirates. He transferred to the command of the sixth-rate HMS Lively in the Irish Sea in September 1719 and then went on half-pay in June 1728.

== Senior command ==
Rowley was recalled and appointed to command second-rate HMS Barfleur in 1741. Promoted to rear-admiral on 7 December 1743, he hoisted his flag in HMS Barfleur and distinguished himself by his determination as commander of the vanguard at the Battle of Toulon in February 1744 during the War of the Austrian Succession. Promoted to vice-admiral on 23 June 1744, he "succeeded to the chief command of the Mediterranean Fleet" in August 1744 and successfully kept the Spanish and French fleets out of the Mediterranean area.

Rowley was asked to preside over a court-martial of Captain Richard Norris (son of Admiral Sir John Norris) on the second-rate HMS Torbay in relation to Norris's conduct at the Battle of Toulon. Rowley found the court incompetent to try the case and Norris escaped censure. Rowley was suspected of showing favour to the son of an old colleague and relieved of his command in May 1745.

Promoted to full admiral on 15 July 1747, Rowley became Rear-Admiral of Great Britain on 4 July 1749. He entered Parliament as Whig member for Taunton in 1750. He also bought Tendring Hall in Stoke-by-Nayland in Suffolk in 1750: the house was subsequently rebuilt to a design by Sir John Soane and remained in the Rowley family until it was demolished in 1955.

Rowley joined the Board of Admiralty led by Lord Anson as Senior Naval Lord in June 1751. He was appointed a Knight Companion of the Order of the Bath on 12 December 1753 and was elected as Member of Parliament for Portsmouth in May 1754. When the First Newcastle Ministry fell in November 1756 he left office but then returned, briefly, as Senior Naval Lord again, during the caretaker ministry which lasted from April to July 1757.

Promoted to Admiral of the Fleet on 17 December 1762, Rowley died on 1 January 1768 and is presumed to have been buried at St Mary's Church in Stoke-by-Nayland in Suffolk.

== Family ==
William Rowley married Arabella Dawson and had five children: four sons and one daughter. Several of his descendants reached high positions in the Navy including his son Vice Admiral Sir Joshua Rowley, his grandson Admiral Sir Josias Rowley, his grandson Admiral Sir Charles Rowley and his grandson Admiral of the Fleet Sir George Martin.

== Sources ==
- Heathcote, Tony (2002). The British Admirals of the Fleet 1734 – 1995. Pen & Sword. ISBN 0-85052-835-6.
- Rodger, N.A.M. (1979). The Admiralty. Offices of State. Lavenham: T. Dalton Ltd. ISBN 0900963948.

Military offices
Preceded by Lord Anson	Senior Naval Lord; 1751–1756	Succeeded by Edward Boscawen
Preceded by Edward Boscawen	Senior Naval Lord; April 1757–July 1757	Succeeded by Edward Boscawen
Preceded by Lord Anson	Admiral of the Fleet; 1762–1768	Succeeded by Sir Edward Hawke
Parliament of Great Britain
Preceded by Sir Charles Wyndham; Robert Webb	Member of Parliament for Taunton; 1750–1754; With: Robert Webb	Succeeded by John Halliday; Lord Carpenter
Preceded by Sir Edward Hawke; Isaac Townsend	Member of Parliament for Portsmouth; 1754–1761; With: Sir Edward Hawke	Succeeded by Sir Edward Hawke; Sir Matthew Fetherstonhaugh, Bt
Honorary titles
Preceded by Thomas Mathews	Rear-Admiral of Great Britain; 1749–1763	Succeeded by Sir Edward Hawke
