= William Morland =

English banker and politician

William Morland (1739–1815) was an English banker and politician, Member of Parliament for Taunton from 1796 to 1806.

== Life ==
Morland formed a bank in 1786 with Griffin Ransom II and Thomas Hammersley; it had London premises at 57 Pall Mall, and traded as Ransom, Morland & Hammersley. George Kinnaird, 7th Lord Kinnaird married Elizabeth Ransom, daughter of the banker Griffin Ransom I, who died 5 January 1784. Lord Kinnaird was also a partner in the bank, though it never traded using his name.

== In politics ==
The bank became closely involved in the financial affairs of the Prince of Wales. Morland had a role in the Duchy of Cornwall in 1789–90. In the 1790 general election he stood for the first time as a parliamentary candidate in the two-seat Taunton constituency, as partner to John Halliday; Ginter suggests that by then he had had some contact with the political manager William Adam of Blair Adam. Morland and Halliday were unsuccessful in the poll.

By 1796, the situation at Taunton was changed by the withdrawal of the sitting Pittite, Alexander Popham. Morland, standing as a Whig, was able to discourage Walter Boyd, another Pittite, from making a serious bid to replace Popham. The election was not contested, and Morland was elected with Sir Benjamin Hammet.

Morland supported the second Pitt administration and opposed the Ministry of All the Talents. The latter took steps in 1806 to exploit resentments in Taunton about process in the 1802 election, and Morland lost his seat to Alexander Baring, prompted by Lord Henry Petty.

== Banking ==
Morland was involved in the setting up at the end of 1801 of the Dundee New Bank, in which Lord Kinnard and John Baxter of Idvies were the major players.

== Family ==
Morland married in 1762 Mary Ann Mills, daughter of Austin Mills of Greenwich. They had one daughter Hannah, or Harriet, who married in 1785 Scrope Bernard.
