= Burning of women in England =

Historical form of capital punishment in England inflicted on women

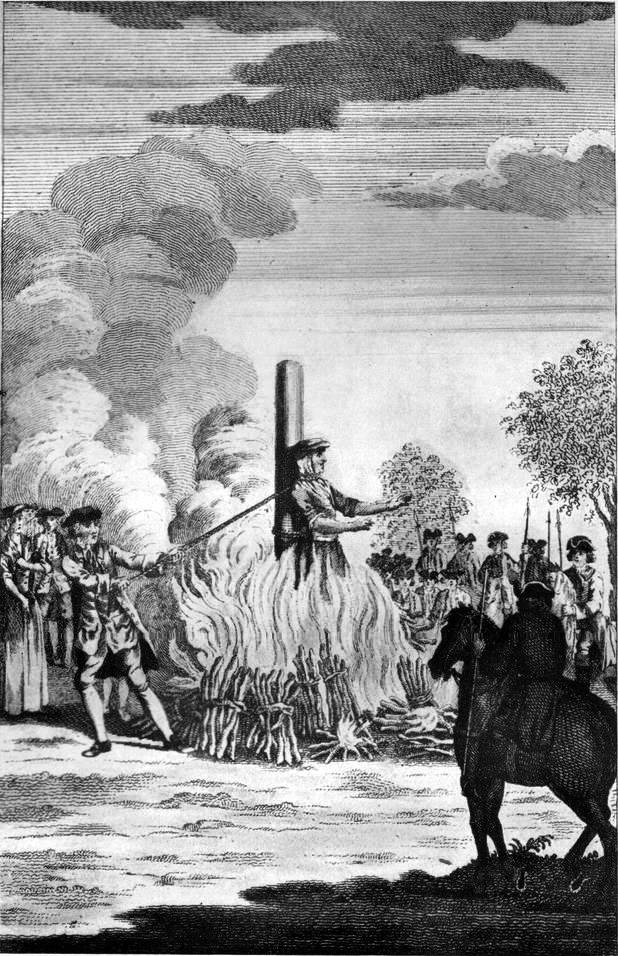
The burning of Catherine Hayes

In England, death by burning was a legal punishment inflicted on women found guilty of high treason, petty treason, and heresy during the Middle Ages and Early Modern period. Over a period of several centuries, female convicts were publicly burnt at the stake, sometimes alive, for a range of activities including coining and mariticide.

While men guilty of heresy were also burned at the stake, those who committed high treason were instead hanged, drawn and quartered. The English jurist William Blackstone supposed that the difference in sentencing, although "full as terrible to the sensation as the other", could be explained by the desire not to publicly expose a woman's body. Public executions were well-attended affairs, and contemporary reports detail the cries of women on the pyre as they were burned alive. It later became commonplace for the executioner to strangle the convict, and for the body to be burned post-mortem.

In the latter half of the eighteenth century, changing attitudes to such public displays prompted Sir Benjamin Hammett MP to denounce the practice in Parliament. His bill, by no means the first such attempt to end the public burning of women, led to the Treason Act 1790, which abolished the sentence.

== Crimes punishable by burning ==
=== Treason ===
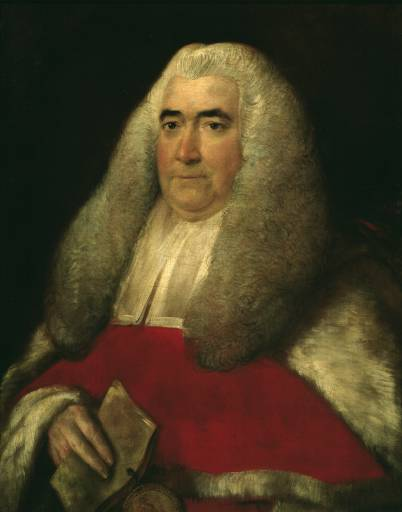
Portrait of William Blackstone (1774) by Thomas Gainsborough. Blackstone believed the reason women were burned rather than hanged, drawn and quartered was to preserve their decency.

By the end of the 13th century, several offences against either one's lord, or one's king, were treasonable. High treason, defined as transgressions against the sovereign, was first codified during King Edward III's reign by the Treason Act 1351. It clarified exactly what crimes constituted treason, following earlier, somewhat "over zealous" interpretations of England's legal codes. For instance, high treason could be committed by anyone found to be compassing the king's death or counterfeiting his coin. High treason remained distinct though, from what became known as petty treason: the killing of a lawful superior, such as a husband by his wife. Though 12th century contemporary authors made few attempts to differentiate between high treason and petty treason, (Note: Records of a woman sentenced to be burned during Edward II's reign, for the attempted murder of her husband, make no mention of petty treason.) enhanced punishments may indicate that the latter was treated more seriously than an ordinary felony.

As the most egregious offence an individual could commit, viewed as seriously as though the accused had personally attacked the monarch, high treason demanded the ultimate punishment. But whereas men guilty of this crime were hanged, drawn and quartered, women were drawn and burned. In his Commentaries on the Laws of England the 18th-century English jurist William Blackstone noted that the sentence, "to be drawn to the gallows, and there to be burned alive", was "full as terrible to the sensation as the other". Blackstone wrote that women were burned rather than quartered as "the decency due to the sex forbids the exposing and publicly mangling their bodies". However, an observation by historian Jules Michelet, that "the first flame to rise consumed the clothes, revealing poor trembling nakedness", may, in the opinion of historian Vic Gatrell, suggest that this solution is "misconceived". In The Hanging Tree, Gatrell concludes that the occasional live burial of women in Europe gave tacit acknowledgement to the possibility that a struggling, kicking female hanging from a noose could "elicit obscene fantasies" from watching males.

=== Heresy ===
Another law enforceable by public burning was De heretico comburendo, introduced in 1401 during the reign of Henry IV. It allowed for the execution of persons of both sexes found guilty of heresy, thought to be "sacrilegious and dangerous to souls, but also seditious and treasonable." Bishops were empowered to arrest and imprison anyone suspected of offences related to heresy and, once convicted, send them to be burned "in the presence of the people in a lofty place". Although the act was repealed in 1533/34, it was revived over 20 years later at the request of Queen Mary I who, during the Marian persecutions, made frequent use of the punishment it allowed.

De heretico comburendo was repealed by the Act of Supremacy 1558, although that act allowed ecclesiastical commissions to deal with occasional instances of heresy. Persons declared guilty, such as Bartholomew Legate and Edward Wightman, could still be burned under a writ of de heretico comburendo issued by the Court of Chancery. The burning of heretics was finally ended by the Ecclesiastical Jurisdiction Act 1677 which, although it allowed ecclesiastical courts to charge people with "atheism, blasphemy, heresy, schism, or other damnable doctrine or opinion", limited their power to excommunication.

== Execution of the sentence ==
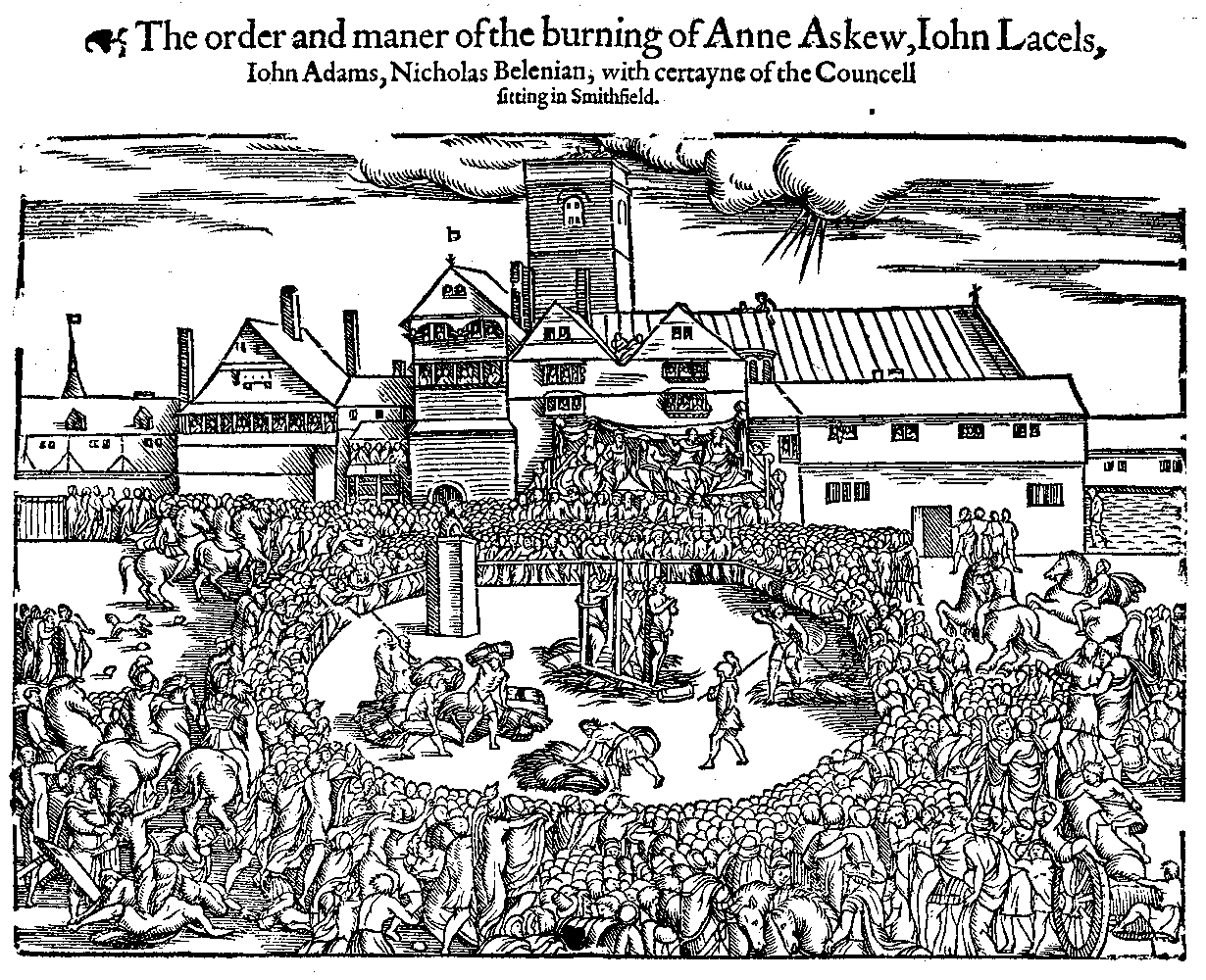
Woodcut of the burning of Anne Askew, for heresy, at Smithfield in 1546

Public executions were normally attended by large crowds. For the killing in 1546 of Anne Askew, charged with heresy and tortured at the Tower of London, a "Substantial Stage" was built to seat the various officials who presided over her burning. A witness to proceedings reported that Askew was so badly injured by her torture that she was unable to stand. Instead, "the dounge carte was holden up between ij sarjantes, perhaps sitting there in a cheare".

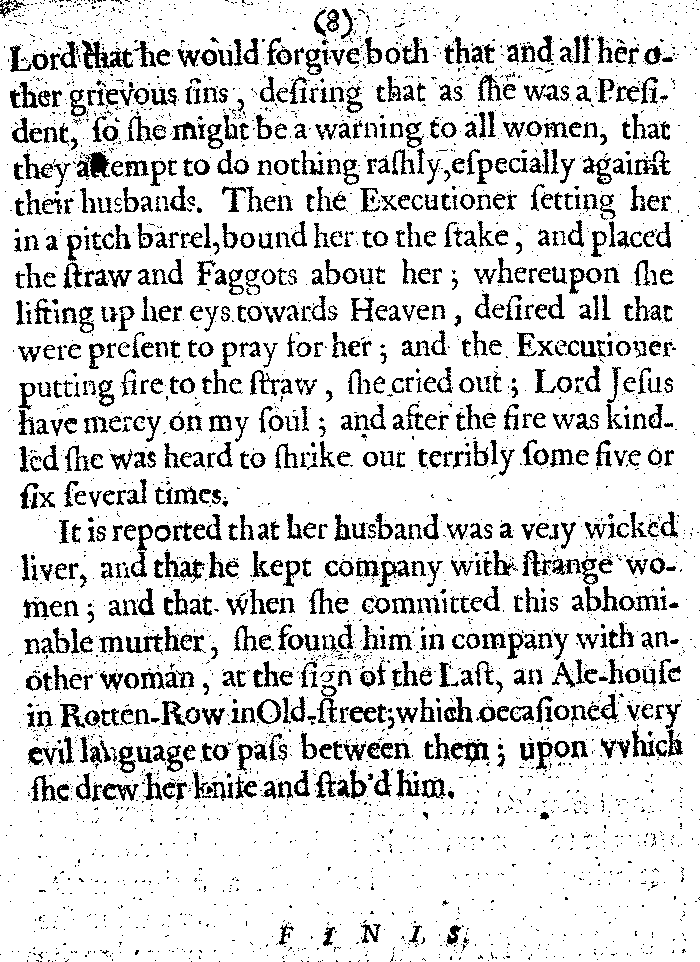
A report detailing the burning of Prudence Lee in 1652

A pamphlet detailing the burning in April 1652 of Joan Peterson, the so-called Witch of Wapping, also describes the execution of Prudence Lee, found guilty of mariticide. Lee was apparently brought on foot, between two sheriff's officers and dressed in a red waistcoat, to the place of execution in Smithfield. There she confessed to having "been a very lewd liver, and much given to cursing and swearing, for which the Lord being offended with her, had suffered her to be brought to that untimely end". She admitted to being jealous of and arguing with her husband, and stabbing him with a knife. The executioner put her in a pitch barrel, tied her to the stake, placed the fuel and faggots around her and set them alight. Lee was reported to have "desired all that were present to pray for her" and, feeling the flames, "shrike[d] out terribly some five or six several times." Burning alive for murder was abolished in 1656, although burning for adultery remained. Thereafter, out of mercy, the condemned were often strangled before the flames took hold. Notable exceptions to this practice were the burnings in 1685 and 1726 of Elizabeth Gaunt, found guilty of high treason for her part in the Rye House Plot, and Catherine Hayes, for petty treason. Hayes apparently "rent the air with her cries and lamentations" when the fire was lit too early, preventing the executioner from strangling her in time. She became the last woman in England to be burned alive.

The law also allowed for the hanging of children aged seven years or more. (Note: One of the last children to be sent to the scaffold was 14-year-old John Bell, who in 1831 was hanged for murdering another boy, Richard Taylor.) Mary Troke, "but sixteen years of age", was burned at Winchester in 1738 for poisoning her mistress. An unidentified 14-year-old girl imprisoned at Newgate was more fortunate. Found guilty in 1777 of being an accomplice to treason, for concealing whitewashed farthings on her person (at her master's request), she had been sentenced to burn. She was saved by the intervention of Thomas Thynne, 1st Marquess of Bath, who happened to be passing.

== Changing attitudes ==
In 1786, Phoebe Harris and her accomplices were "indicted, for that they, on the 11th of February last, one piece of false, feigned, and counterfeit money and coin, to the likeness and similitude of the good, legal, and silver coin of this realm, called a shilling, falsely, deceitfully, feloniously, and traiterously did counterfeit and coin". Watched by a reported 20,000 people, she was led to the stake and stood on a stool, where a noose, attached to an iron bolt driven into the top of the stake, was placed around her neck. As prayers were read, the stool was taken away and over the course of several minutes, her feet kicking as her body convulsed, Harris strangled to death. About 30 minutes later, faggots were placed around the stake, her body was chained into position, and subsequently burned for over two hours.

Executions like this had once passed with little to no comment in the press. Historically, while fewer women than men were subjected to capital punishment, proportionately more were acquitted, found guilty of lesser charges, or pardoned if condemned. In centuries past, these women were judged by publications such as The Newgate Calendar to have succumbed to their own perversions, or to have been led astray. But while 18th and 19th-century women guilty of treasonable crimes were still seen as villains, increasingly, the cause of their descent was ascribed to villainous men. Those people concerned about the brutality inflicted on condemned women were, in Gatrell's opinion, "activated by the sense that even at their worst women were creatures to be pitied and protected from themselves, and perhaps revered, like all women from whom men were born." Commenting on Harris's execution, The Daily Universal Register claimed that the act reflected "a scandal upon the law", "a disgrace to the police" and "was not only inhuman, but shamefully indelicate and shocking". The newspaper asked "why should the law in this species of offence inflict a severer punishment upon a woman, than upon a man"?

Harris's fate prompted William Wilberforce to sponsor a bill which, if passed, would have abolished the practice. But as one of its proposals would have allowed the anatomical dissection of criminals other than murderers, the House of Lords rejected it. Though sympathetic to reform of England's Bloody Code, Lord Chief Justice Loughborough saw no need to change the law: "Although the punishment, as a spectacle, was rather attended with circumstances of horror, likely to make a more strong impression on the beholders than mere hanging, the effect was much the same, as in fact, no greater degree of personal pain was sustained, the criminal being always strangled before the flames were suffered to approach the body".

When on 25 June 1788 Margaret Sullivan was hanged and burned for coining, the same newspaper (by then called The Times) wrote:

There is something so inhuman in burning a woman, for what only subjects a man to hanging, that human nature shudders at the idea. Must not mankind laugh as our long speeches against African slavery—and our fine sentiments on Indian cruelties, when just in the very eye of the Sovereign we roast a female fellow creature alive, for putting a pennyworth of quicksilver on a half-penny worth of brass. The savage barbarity of the punishment—and the smallness of the offence in the eye of God are contrasts that should meet the consideration of Government.

The Gentleman's Magazine addressed the Prime Minister, William Pitt the Younger:

the woman was brought out attended by a priest of the Romish persuasion, and as soon as she came to the stake she was placed upon a stool, which was instantly removed from under her, and she left suspended, when the faggots were placed around her, and being set on fire she was soon consumed to ashes.—Mr. Pitt, himself a lawyer, 'tis hoped, will not suffer this cruel remain of savage legislation to escape his notice, and continue a disgrace to the enlightened sense of this country.

Although in his objections to Wilberforce's 1786 bill Loughborough had noted that these women were dead long before they suffered the flames, many newspapers of the day made no such distinction. The Times incorrectly stated that Sullivan was burned alive, rhetoric which, in Dr Simon Devereaux's opinion, could be "rooted in the growing reverence for domesticated womanhood" that might have been expected at the time. As many objections may also have been raised by the perceived inequity of drawing and burning women for coining, whereas until 1783, when the halting of executions at Tyburn removed ritualistic dragging from public view, men were simply drawn and hanged. A widening gulf between the numbers of men and women whipped in London (during the 1790s, 393 men versus 47 women), which mirrors a similar decline in the sending of women to the pillory, may also indicate an imposition of commonly held gender ideals on English penal practices.

== Abolition ==
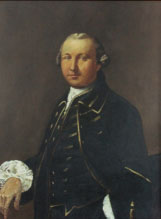
Portrait of Sir Benjamin Hammett

The burning in 1789 of Catherine Murphy, for coining, received practically no attention from the newspapers (perhaps owing to practical limitations on how much news they could publish across only four pages), but it may have been enacted by Sir Benjamin Hammett, a former sheriff of London. Hammett was also an MP, and in 1790 he introduced to Parliament a Bill for Altering the Sentence of Burning Women. He denounced the punishment as "the savage remains of Norman policy" which "disgraced our statutes", as "the practice did the common law". He also highlighted how a sheriff who refused to carry out the sentence was liable to prosecution. William Wilberforce and Hammett were not the first men to attempt to end the burning of women. Almost 140 years earlier, during the Interregnum, a group of lawyers and laymen known as the Hale Commission (after its chairman Matthew Hale), was tasked by the House of Commons to take "into consideration what inconveniences there are in the law". Among the proposed reforms was the replacement of burning at the stake with hanging, but, mainly through the objections of various interested parties, none of the commission's proposals made it into law during the Rump Parliament. Hammett was confident though. He believed that public opinion was on his side and that "the House would go with him in the cause of humanity". The change in execution venues, from Tyburn to Newgate, also attracted criticism. Following Phoebe Harris's burning in 1786, as well as questioning the inequality of English law The Times complained about the location of the punishment and its effect on locals:

When remission of burning was refused, the scene of inhumanity should have been changed; the consequences have been serious; several persons in the neighbourhood of Newgate lying ill, have been severely affected by the smoke which issued from the body of the unhappy female victim.

Another factor was the fate of Sophia Girton, found guilty of coining. Hammett's bill was introduced only four days before Girton's fate was to be decided, but a petition for her respite from burning, supported by another sheriff of London (either Thomas Baker or William Newman) and brought to King George III's notice by William Grenville, proved successful. Devereaux suggests that her impending fate lent weight to the eventual outcome of Hammett's bill, which was to abolish the burning of women for treason through the Treason Act 1790. Catherine Murphy, who at her execution in 1789 was "drest in a clean striped gown, a white ribbon, and a black ribbon round her cap", was the last woman in England to be burned.

== See also ==
- Outline of capital punishment
- Arden of Faversham
- Coventry Martyrs
- Pleading the belly
