= Alexander Popham (penal reformer) =

British penal reformer and politician

Alexander Popham (18 July 1729 – 13 October 1810) was a British penal reformer and politician who sat in the House of Commons between 1768 and 1796.

== Life ==
Born to Alexander Popham, a rector, and his wife Mary, Popham matriculated at Balliol College, Oxford on 11 November 1746, transferring to All Souls College, Oxford, where he was awarded his Bachelor of Arts degree in 1751 and his Master of Arts degree in 1755. While at All Souls, Popham studied under and became friends with Sir William Blackstone; his notes are the only surviving records of Blackstone's first set of law lectures.

After being called to the Bar by the Middle Temple in 1755, Popham worked as a barrister before his election as Member of Parliament for Taunton in 1768. As a chairman of Quarter Sessions, Popham saw the disturbing conditions in which prisoners were held, and on 17 February 1774 introduced a bill to provide proper ventilation, bathing, the immediate treatment of the ill and a qualified surgeon or apothecary at each jail. Losing his seat in the 1774 election, he was returned to Parliament again in March 1775, only to again lose his seat in 1780. Returning in 1784, Popham held the seat until 1796, supporting the Pitt Administration, and in 1791 introduced a poor law amendment bill that was significantly watered down due to its radical nature.

Popham died on 13 October 1810, and was buried in Temple Church.

Parliament of Great Britain
Preceded by Laurence Sulivan; Robert Maxwell	Member of Parliament for Taunton; 1768–1774; With: Nathaniel Webb	Succeeded by Hon. Edward Stratford; Nathaniel Webb
Preceded by Hon. Edward Stratford; Nathaniel Webb	Member of Parliament for Taunton; 1775–1780; With: John Halliday	Succeeded by John Halliday; Major-General John Roberts
Preceded by John Halliday (Sir) Benjamin Hammet	Member of Parliament for Taunton; 1784–1796; With: (Sir) Benjamin Hammet	Succeeded by William Morland (Sir) Benjamin Hammet
