= Catherine Murphy (counterfeiter) =

English counterfeiter

- Died: 18 March 1789
- Cause of death: Execution by burning
- Other names: Christian Murphy
- Occupation: counterfeiter
- Known for: Last woman to be officially executed by burning in England
- Criminal charge: Coining (counterfeiting)
- Criminal penalty: Death
- Spouse: Hugh Murphy

Catherine Murphy (died 18 March 1789) (also known as Christian Murphy) was an English counterfeiter, the last woman in England to be officially burned at the stake.

Catherine Murphy and her husband, Hugh Murphy, were convicted for coining at the Old Bailey in London and sentenced to death on 18 September 1788. She and her husband were executed on the morning of 18 March 1789 at Newgate Prison along with seven other men who had been convicted of various offences.

The eight men were executed by hanging. But as a woman, the law provided that Murphy should be burnt at the stake. She was brought out past the hanging bodies of the others, and made to stand on a foot-high, 10-inch-square platform in front of the stake. She was secured to the stake with ropes and an iron ring. When she finished her prayers, her executioner, William Brunskill, piled faggots of straw around the stake and lit them.

Murphy was not burned alive. After Prudence Lee in 1652, it had been the practice to strangle the condemned before setting the stake alight. According to testimony given by Sir Benjamin Hammett, the Sheriff of London, he gave instructions that she should be strangled before being burned. She was, reportedly, tied with one rope around her neck, after which the platform was removed from under her feet and 30 minutes passed before the fire was lit, and thus, she was not actually burned alive.

Murphy remains the last person to have been sentenced and, at least officially, executed by the method of burning. In part through the efforts of Sir Benjamin Hammett, who took the execution of Murphy as an example when he criticised this form of punishment, burning as a method of execution was abolished the next year, by the Treason Act 1790.
