= Prudence Lee =

Prudence Lee (died 10 April 1652) was an English woman who was executed for murder in London.

She was put on trial for murdering her husband Philip Lee. Philip Lee was reportedly "a very wicked liver and kept the company of strange women" and habitually unfaithful, and Prudence Lee had stabbed him with a knife after a public argument resulting from her discovering him in the company of another woman at an alehouse in Rotten Row on Old Street.

She was judged guilty as charged. Since the murder of a husband was defined as petty treason, the punishment was death by burning. She confessed to have "been a lewd liver and much given to cursing" and hope that her case would serve as a warning to others.

She was executed at Smithfield in London by burning alive at the stake on 10 April 1652. She is known as one of the last women to be executed in England for murder by burning alive; while the punishment remained on paper until the execution of Catherine Murphy in 1789, practice after Prudence Lee became to strangle the condemned on a low gibbet before covering her with faggots and setting the stake alight (Elizabeth Gaunt, executed for treason in 1685, was in practice denied strangulation).

Her case was the subject of a contemporary pamphlet treatise, The Witch of Wapping (1652).
