= Almeria Carpenter =

British courtier

Lady Almeria Carpenter
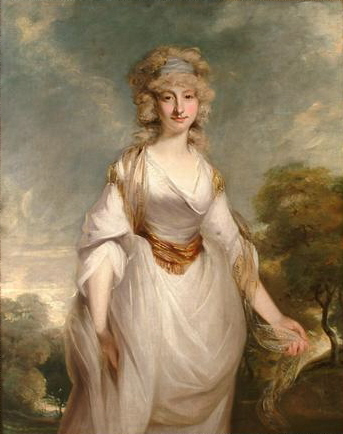
- Portrait by Richard Cosway
- Born: 1752
- Died: 1809 (aged 56–57)
- Partner: Prince William Henry, Duke of Gloucester and Edinburgh
- Parent(s): George Carpenter, 1st Earl of Tyrconnell; Frances Clifton

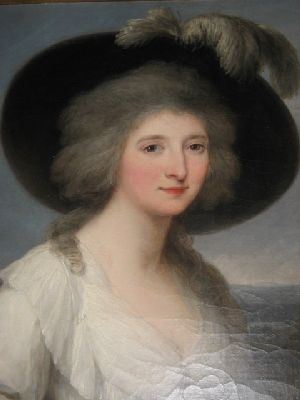
Portrait by Angelica Kauffmann on display at Kiplin Hall.

Lady Almeria Carpenter (1752 – 1809) was a British courtier. She is most known for being the mistress of Prince William Henry, Duke of Gloucester and Edinburgh from circa 1780 until his death in 1805.

== Life ==
She was the daughter of the politician George Carpenter, 1st Earl of Tyrconnell, and his wife, Frances Clifton, daughter of Sir Robert Clifton, 5th Baronet. She never married. Not much is known about her life until she was employed as the lady-in-waiting of Maria Walpole, wife of Prince William Henry, Duke of Gloucester and Edinburgh.

She became the mistress of Prince William Henry, Duke of Gloucester and Edinburgh, in the early 1780s. She was his mistress by the time they and William's wife made a trip together to Italy in 1782. She lived with William at Gloucester House, officially as the lady-in-waiting of his wife, and was said to be “its ornament and pride” and hostess at their house. She was widely appreciated for her beauty and her disdain of convention, but it was also noted that she was not very clever.

She continued to be the lover of William until his death in 1805. She died in 1809.

Almira Carpenter was painted by Richard Cosway and Angelica Kauffmann.

== Possible child ==
In 1910 Alice the wife of Sir Alexander Bosville Macdonald of the Isles privately published A romantic chapter in family history (London, 1910) in which she said that her husband’s great-grandmother Louisa was the daughter of Lady Almeria Carpenter by William Henry, Duke of Gloucester. She claimed to be drawing on an unpublished account written by Louisa’s daughter Hon Elizabeth Diana Davidson of Tulloch (1804-1839).

Alice Macdonald wrote that Almeria ‘always considered herself the Duke of Gloucester’s wife, and said she had letters from himself which proved this. Unfortunately these letters by her own request were buried with her when she died at Holyrood Palace, Edinburgh (in 1809 aged fifty-seven) where she had been given rooms by the king’. Almeria actually died on 13 September 1809 at a house which she had rented at Brompton, Middlesex, and she was buried near her brother Hon Charles Carpenter (who had lived at Thames Ditton and died in 1803) at Richmond, Surrey, 19 September 1809. Her testamentary writings (dated at Brompton, 9 August 1809) made no mention of the Duke or of any child. The duke had in any case legally married Maria, Countess Waldegrave in 1766 and had children by her in 1773, 1774 and 1776, she living unhappily with the Duke until his death in 1805.

Alice Macdonald also claimed that Almeria had a daughter, Louisa, by the Duke of Gloucester, who at Christmas 1799 was abducted by Godfrey Macdonald (subsequently Godfrey Bosville-Macdonald, 3rd Baron Macdonald of Slate), he having seen her at Esher, they going to Ireland and marrying ‘by mutual consent’. They had three children and then in 1803, when she was again pregnant, they married by licence of the Archdeacon of Norwich dated the same day at St Gregory, Norwich, 29 December 1803; she appears in the marriage allegation and bond as Louisa Maria LacCoast. The handwriting of the entry in the register is again ‘LacCoast’ with her signature as ‘Laccoast’. Why she married in this surname is not explained. The register entry includes the standard wording ‘married in this Church’ but Alice Macdonald says, ‘The entry in the Register of the Church does not say whether they were married actually in church or not’.

The late Professor Arthur Aspinall equated Louisa Maria LacCoast with ‘Miss Lacoste’ an attendant on Caroline, Princess of Wales, mentioned in a letter from the Earl of Moira to the Prince of Wales dated June 1796 in which the Duke of York is mentioned as not thinking it politic to dismiss her. If this is the same person she would have been aged about 14 in 1796. The Duke of York had a popular Groom of the Chamber called Lacoste from 1789 to 1813 but no connection between him and Louisa has been shown.

In a formal declaration made about their marriage before the Provost of Annan on 26 October 1807 Louisa, without mentioning the name LacCoast, described herself as ‘Mrs Louisa Maria Edsir’, saying that she and Godfrey were ‘engaged and betrothed to each other as husband and wife in Christmas week 1799, and from that period understood themselves to be married persons’ Godfrey Macdonald’s wife Louisa Maria had in fact for many years been described in printed peerages as the ‘daughter of Farley Edsir, Esq.’, and she was so described in Godfrey Macdonald’s obituary in 1832, in her own obituary in 1835 and in the above-mentioned daughter’s obituary in 1839, as well as in the Gentleman's Magazine, in Edmund Lodge’s Peerage of the British Empire in 1837 and in Burke’s Peerage in 1901.

Alice Macdonald says that Louisa had initially been adopted by and taken the surname of one Farley Edsir a steward to the Duke of Gloucester and tenant of a dairy farm near Hampton Court. She says that Louisa believed that she was born 6 January 1782 and that her ‘birth’ was entered incorrectly under the date 4 February 1781 in the baptismal register of Leatherhead, Surrey, where an entry in 1781 reads ‘Maria D. of Farley & Mary Edsar – Febry 4’. She seems to be suggesting some later interpolation but searches show that Maria was the eighth of ten children baptised to Farley and Mary Edsor, Edsar or Edser, seven at Stoke d’Abernon between 1766 and 1780 and then three at Leatherhead between 1781 and 1787. Farley Edser, a labourer unable to sign his name, had married Mary Rampton at Stoke D’Abernon, Surrey (between Esher and Leatherhead) on 15 May 1766 and was buried at Esher, Surrey, 17 March 1811. His wife Mary was buried at Esher from Chelsea, aged 72, in 1815. Mrs Davidson of Tulloch had apparently claimed to have seen a paper signed by Mary Edser after the death of the Duke of Gloucester in 1805 to the effect that Louisa Maria was ‘not her child, but of great parents’ words which echo those that Farley is alleged to have used to Godfrey Macdonald when he asked permission to marry the girl in 1799. Alice Macdonald admitted that 'there is no evidence that her 'great' parents ever took the smallest notice of her'.

No evidence has been produced to show a link between Almeria Carpenter and the child baptised Edser, or to the attendant Lacoste and the LacCoast who became Mrs Macdonald and was later said to have been an Edsir. The evidence indicates that Louisa was Farley Edser’s legitimate child.
