= Nathaniel Webb (MP) =

British politician and plantation owner

Nathaniel Webb (1725–1786) was a West Indies plantation owner and British politician who sat in the House of Commons between 1768 and 1780.

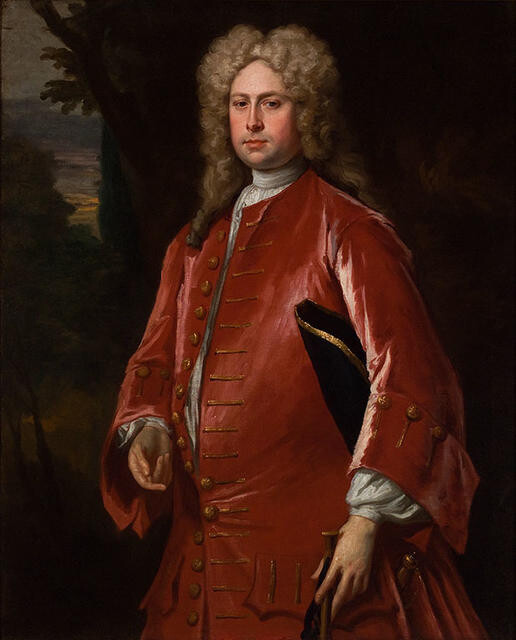
Painting of Nathanial Webb father, c.1705

Webb was the second son of Nathaniel Webb and his wife Bethiah Gerrish, daughter of William Gerrish of Montserrat, and was baptized on 21 August 1725. His father was collector of customs at Montserrat. He was possibly educated at Eton College in 1742. In 1741 he inherited his father's West Indian plantations. He married Elizabeth Nanton on 2 December 1747. In 1765 he inherited the family property in Taunton from his brother Robert.

In the 1768 general election Webb was returned unopposed as Member of Parliament for Taunton. He was supported by local tradesmen who formed an association in the Market House Society. He then gave £2,000 for the new market house. He stood again at Taunton in the 1774 general election with the support of Lord North, who was then recorder of Taunton. He was returned after an expensive contest but was unseated on petition on 16 March 1775. He successfully contested Ilchester at a by-election on 14 December 1775. He did not stand again in 1780. He is not recorded as having spoken in Parliament.

Webb died in November 1786.

Parliament of Great Britain
| Preceded by Laurence Sulivan; Robert Maxwell | Member of Parliament for Taunton; 1768–1775; With: Alexander Popham; Hon. Edward Stratford | Succeeded by John Halliday; Alexander Popham |
| Preceded by Peregrine Cust; William Innes | Member of Parliament for Ilchester; 1775–1780; With: Owen Salusbury Brereton | Succeeded by Peregrine Cust; Samuel Smith |
