= John Halliday (died 1805) =

British politician

John Halliday (c. 1737–1805) was a British politician who sat in the House of Commons from 1775 to 1784.

Halliday was the eldest son of John Halliday of Yard House, Taunton and his wife Mary Welman, daughter of Isaac Welman of Poundisford Park, Somerset. He succeeded his father in 1754. In 1756 he entered Inner Temple. He founded the banking firm of Halliday and Co. in Lombard Street in about 1770, and went into partnership with Sir John Duntze, Bt in 1776.

Halliday contested Taunton on the interest of the Market House Society in the 1774 general election but was defeated. However he was returned on petition as Member of Parliament on 16 March 1775. In 1780 he was returned without contest with the help of Lord North whom he was now supporting. Halliday did not stand at the 1784 general election because he hoped to be given a post as commissioner of taxes. To this end he gave up his partnership in the banking house to remove any objection to the appointment, and worked hard to get an Administration supporter returned at Taunton. In spite of this effort and sacrifice, he did not get the post. He stood again for Taunton in 1790 but was defeated.

Halliday died unmarried on 21 April 1805, aged 68.

== Sources ==
Parliament of Great Britain
| Preceded by Hon. Edward Stratford; Nathaniel Webb | Member of Parliament for Taunton; 1775–1784; With: Alexander Popham 1775-1780; Major-General John Roberts1780-1782 (Sir) Benjamin Hammet1782-1784 | Succeeded by Alexander Popham (Sir) Benjamin Hammet |
