= John Maxwell, 1st Baron Farnham =

Irish peer and politician (1687–1759)

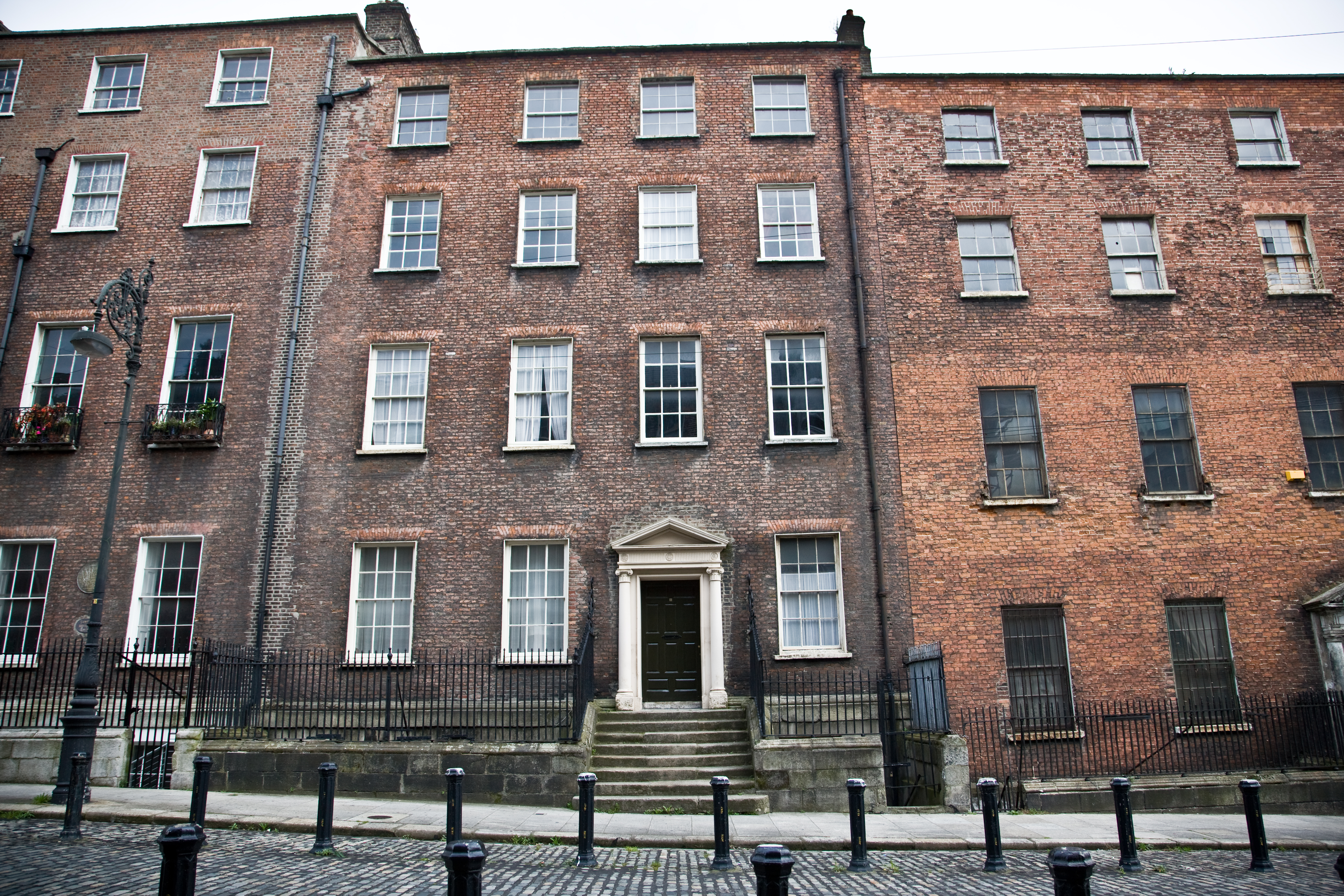
Farnham's town house 4 Henrietta Street, Dublin, August 2008

John Maxwell, 1st Baron Farnham (1687 – 6 August 1759) was an Irish peer and politician.

He was the son of the Reverend Robert Maxwell and Anne Stewart, daughter of Colonel George Stewart. His paternal grandfather was Robert Maxwell, Bishop of Kilmore.

He was appointed Prothonotary of the Court of Common Pleas (Ireland) and held the office from 1725 until his death. He was a member of parliament (MP) of the Irish House of Commons for County Cavan from 1727 to 1756. He inherited Farnham estate from his cousin in 1737 and was appointed High Sheriff of Cavan for 1739. The latter year he was raised to the Peerage of Ireland as Baron Farnham, of Farnham in the County of Cavan.

He had married in 1719 Judith Barry, daughter of James Barry of Newton Barry and Anne Meredyth, and had the following children:

1. Robert Maxwell, 1st Earl of Farnham, 2nd Baron Farnham (born c. 1720 – died 16 November 1779 without male issue). (Earldom extinct, 1779)
2. Barry Maxwell, 1st Earl of Farnham, 3rd Baron Farnham (died 7 October 1800). (Earldom restored, 1785)
3. Rt. Rev. Henry Maxwell (died 7 October 1798) was Bishop of Dromore (1765–1766) and Bishop of Meath (1766–1798). He married in 1759 Margaret Foster, daughter of the Rt. Hon. Anthony Foster, and sister of John Foster, 1st Baron Oriel. Their two sons, John and Henry, eventually succeeded as the 5th and 6th Baron Farnham.

He died in August 1759 and was succeeded in the barony by his son Robert. In 1760 Robert was created Viscount Farnham and three years later created Earl of Farnham.

Parliament of Ireland
Preceded by Mervyn Pratt; Brockhill Newburgh	Member of Parliament for County Cavan; 1727–1756; With: Charles Coote 1727–1750; Hon. Brinsley Butler 1751–1756	Succeeded by Lord Newtown-Butler; Hon. Barry Maxwell
Peerage of Ireland
New creation	Baron Farnham; 1756–1759	Succeeded by Robert Maxwell
