= Treason Act 1790 =

Act of the Parliament of Great Britain

Treason Act 1790 (Note: The citation of this act by this short title was authorised by section 1 of, and the first schedule to, the Short Titles Act 1896. Due to the repeal of those provisions it is now authorised by section 19(2) of the Interpretation Act 1978.)
- Act of Parliament
- Parliament of Great Britain
- Long title: An Act for discontinuing the Judgement which has been required by Law to be given against Women convicted of certain Crimes, and substituting another Judgement in lieu thereof.
- Citation: 30 Geo. 3. c. 48
- Territorial extent: Great Britain

Dates
- Royal assent: 9 June 1790
- Commencement: 5 June 1790 (Note: Section 1.)
- Repealed: 30 September 1998 (Note: The Crime and Disorder Act 1998 (Commencement No. 2 and Transitional Provisions) Order 1998 (SI 1998/2327).)
Other legislation
Amended by	Offences Against the Person Act 1828; Criminal Law (India) Act 1828; Forfeiture Act 1870; Statute Law Revision Act 1871; Statute Law Revision Act 1888; Statute Law Revision Act 1948; Criminal Justice (Scotland) Act 1949; Statute Law Revision Act 1960
Repealed by	Crime and Disorder Act 1998
Relates to	Treason by Women Act (Ireland) 1796

Status: Repealed

Text of statute as originally enacted

Revised text of statute as amended

The Treason Act 1790 (30 Geo. 3. c. 48) was an act of the Parliament of Great Britain which abolished burning at the stake as the penalty for women convicted of high treason, petty treason and abetting, procuring or counselling petty treason, and replaced it with drawing and hanging.

Identical provision was made for Ireland by the Treason by Women Act (Ireland) 1796 (36 Geo. 3. c. 31 (I)).

== Provisions ==
=== Section 1 ===
The original penalty for high treason, petty treason or abetting counselling or procuring petty treason for women was to be drawn to the place of execution and burned to death. This was replaced, with effect from 5 June 1790, with drawing to the place of execution followed by hanging by section 1.

=== Section 2 ===
Section 2 of the act made provision for women convicted of petty treason to suffer additional punishments which were already provided for murder by the Murder Act 1751 (25 Geo. 2. c. 37), ss. 1 - 10. This included provision for the disposal of the body.

=== Section 3 ===
This section allowed the King to alter the sentence of any woman condemned to burning having been convicted of those offences prior to (the commencement of section 1 on) 5 June 1790. By warrant under the hand of one of the principal Secretaries of State, the King had the discretionary ("if he shall think proper") authority to order that the condemned woman be hanged in the execution of that judgement.

=== Section 4 ===
Section 4 of the act was a saving clause and provided that women convicted of those offences would still be liable to such forfeitures and corruption of blood as they would have been if they had been attainted of those offences before the passing of the act.

== Subsequent developments ==
The whole act "as relates to petit treason" was repealed for England and Wales by section 1 of the Offences Against the Person Act 1828 (9 Geo. 4. c. 31), which came into force on 1 July 1828. The repeal was consequential on the abolition of petty treason by section 2 of the 1828 act.

Section 1 of the act was amended by the Forfeiture Act 1870 (33 & 34 Vict. c. 23) to abolish drawing.

Section 3 of the act was repealed by section 1 of, and the schedule to, the Statute Law Revision Act 1871 (34 & 35 Vict. c. 116), which came into force on 21 August 1871.

Section 4 of the act was repealed by section 1(1) of, and the schedule to, the Statute Law Revision Act 1960 (8 & 9 Eliz. 2. c. 56), which came into force on 29 July 1960.

The whole act was repealed by section 36(3)(a) and section 120(2) of, and schedule 10 to the Crime and Disorder Act 1998, which came into force on 30 September 1998. The 1998 act abolished the death penalty for treason.

== See also ==
- Capital punishment in the United Kingdom
- High treason in the United Kingdom
- Treason Act
