= Robert Maxwell, 1st Earl of Farnham =

Irish peer (c. 1720–1779)

Robert Maxwell, 1st Earl of Farnham PC (c. 1720 – 16 November 1779), styled The Honourable Robert Maxwell from 1756 to 1759, was an Irish peer and a Member of both the Parliament of Great Britain and the Parliament of Ireland.

== Early life ==
Farnham was the eldest son of John Maxwell, 1st Baron Farnham and Judith Barry, daughter of James Barry, and was educated at Trinity College Dublin. He inherited the Farnham estate in County Cavan on the death of his father in 1759. He was appointed High Sheriff of Cavan in 1757.

== Career ==
Farnham was elected to the Irish House of Commons for Lisburn in 1743, a seat he held until 1759. Crossing to England he also became Member of Parliament for Taunton at a ruinously expensive by-election in 1754, his father putting up £3,000 which had to be more than matched from the government's "secret service" funds to secure his election. He afterwards described the campaign, in a letter to Lord George Sackville, as "a great deal of smoaking, some drinking, and kissing some hundreds of women; but it was to good purpose... I may venture to say that I have now near 150 majority".

He succeeded as 2nd Baron Farnham on 6 August 1759. He was created Viscount Farnham on 10 September 1760, and Earl of Farnham on 13 May 1763. He also became a Privy Councillor in Ireland on 19 September 1760. He remained in the British House of Commons until 1768, being re-elected in 1761 and supporting the governments of Lord Bute and George Grenville, though there is no record of his ever having spoken in the House.

== Personal life ==
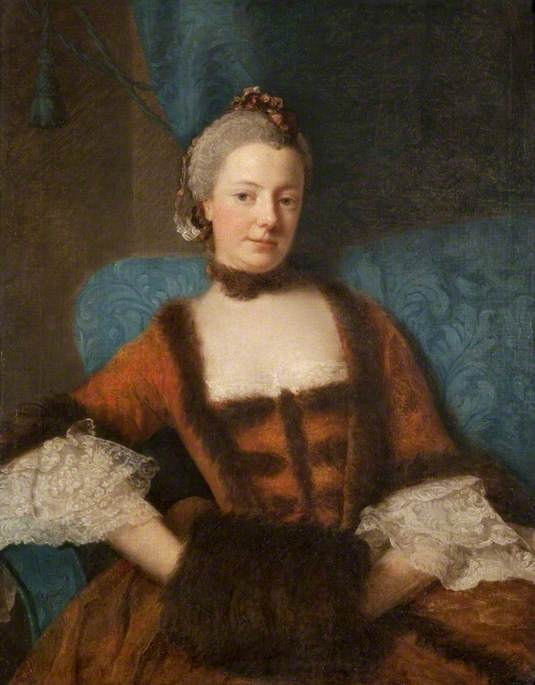
Portrait of his wife, Henrietta Diana, Dowager Countess of Stafford, by Allan Ramsay, 1759

Lord Farnham married twice, firstly in 1759 to Henrietta (née Cantillon), widow of William Matthias Stafford-Howard, 3rd Earl of Stafford (died 1761), and daughter of Richard Cantillon and Mary Mahoney. They had two children:

- John Maxwell (1760–1777), styled Viscount Maxwell who died unmarried.
- Lady Henrietta Maxwell (d. 1852), who married the Irish politician Denis Daly and had issue.

He married secondly in 1771 to Sarah Cosby, daughter of Pole Cosby of Stradbally and Mary Dodwell and sister of Dudley Cosby, 1st Baron Sydney, but had no further issue.

On his death the earldom and the viscountcy titles became extinct, whilst the barony passed to his brother, Barry Maxwell.

Parliament of Ireland
Preceded by Nicholas Price; Edward Smyth	Member of Parliament for Lisburn; 1743–1759; With: Edward Smyth 1743–1759	Succeeded by Francis Price; Edward Smyth
Parliament of Great Britain
Preceded by The Lord Carpenter; John Halliday	Member of Parliament for Taunton; 1754–1768; With: The Lord Carpenter 1754–1762; Laurence Sulivan 1762–1768	Succeeded by Alexander Popham; Nathaniel Webb
Peerage of Ireland
New creation	Earl of Farnham; 1763–1779	Extinct
New creation	Viscount Farnham; 1760–1779	Extinct
Preceded by John Maxwell	Baron Farnham; 1759–1779	Succeeded by Barry Maxwell
