= George Carpenter, 1st Earl of Tyrconnell =

British peer and politician

The Right Honourable The Earl of Tyrconnell
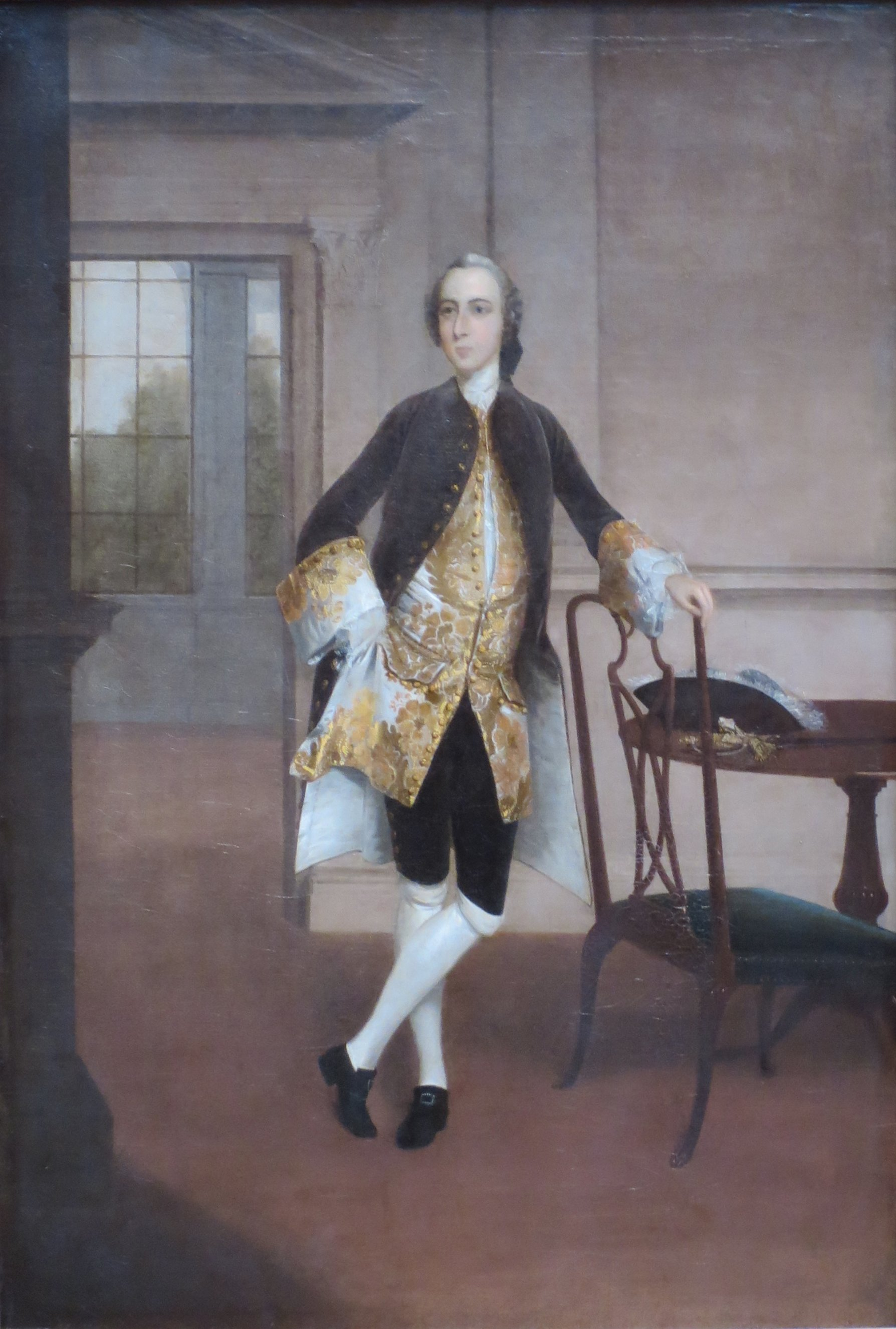
- Portrait by Arthur Devis, 1745

Personal details
- Born: 26 August 1723 Herefordshire, England
- Died: 9 March 1762 (aged 38)
- Spouse: Lady Frances Clifton
- Children: 6, including George and Almeria
- Parent(s): George Carpenter, 2nd Baron Carpenter; Elizabeth Petty

George Carpenter, 1st Earl of Tyrconnell (26 August 1723 – 9 March 1762), known as The Lord Carpenter between 1749 and 1761, was a British peer and politician.

== Background ==
Carpenter was the only surviving son of George Carpenter, 2nd Baron Carpenter by Elizabeth (née Petty), of Ocle Pychard, Herefordshire, England.

This nobleman married in March 1747/1748, Frances, the only daughter and heiress of Sir Robert Clifton, 5th Baronet, of Clifton, county of Nottingham, England and heiress of her mother, Lady Frances Coote, only daughter of Nanfan Coote, 2nd Earl of Bellamont. They had six children;

- George Carpenter, later 2nd Earl, (1750–1805)
- Hon. Frances Carpenter, (1751 – 1751/1752) who died as an infant
- Lady Almeria Carpenter (1752 – 1809), a Lady of the Bedchamber to Maria, Duchess of Gloucester and Edinburgh.
- Hon. Elizabeth Carpenter (1753–1753) who died as an infant
- Hon. Charles Carpenter (1757–1803), a naval officer and MP for Berwick-upon-Tweed, whose son George succeeded as 3rd Earl of Tyrconnell.
- Lady Caroline Carpenter (abt 1759 – 1826) married Uvedale Price, of Foxley.

== Career ==
Lord Carpenter sat as Member of Parliament for Taunton between 1754 and 1762. He was created Viscount Carlingford, in the County of Louth, and Earl of Tyrconnell, in the Province of Ulster, in the Peerage of Ireland on 29 May 1761. This line became extinct in 1853.

== Coat of arms ==
Lord Carpenter's arms appears to be of French or Norman heritage, "Paly of six, argent and gules, on a chevron azure, 3 cross crosslets or." Crest, on a wreath a globe in a frame all or. Supporters, two horses, party-perfess, embattled argent and gules. Motto: "Per Acuta Belli" (Through the Asperities of War). These arms descend from John Carpenter, the younger (abt. 1372 – 1442) who was the noted Town Clerk of London during the reigns of King Henry V and King Henry VI.

These arms are often referred to as the Hereford Arms, named for the later ancestral home of the Carpenter family in Hereford, England. The crest, supporters and motto have apparently changed several times over the centuries.

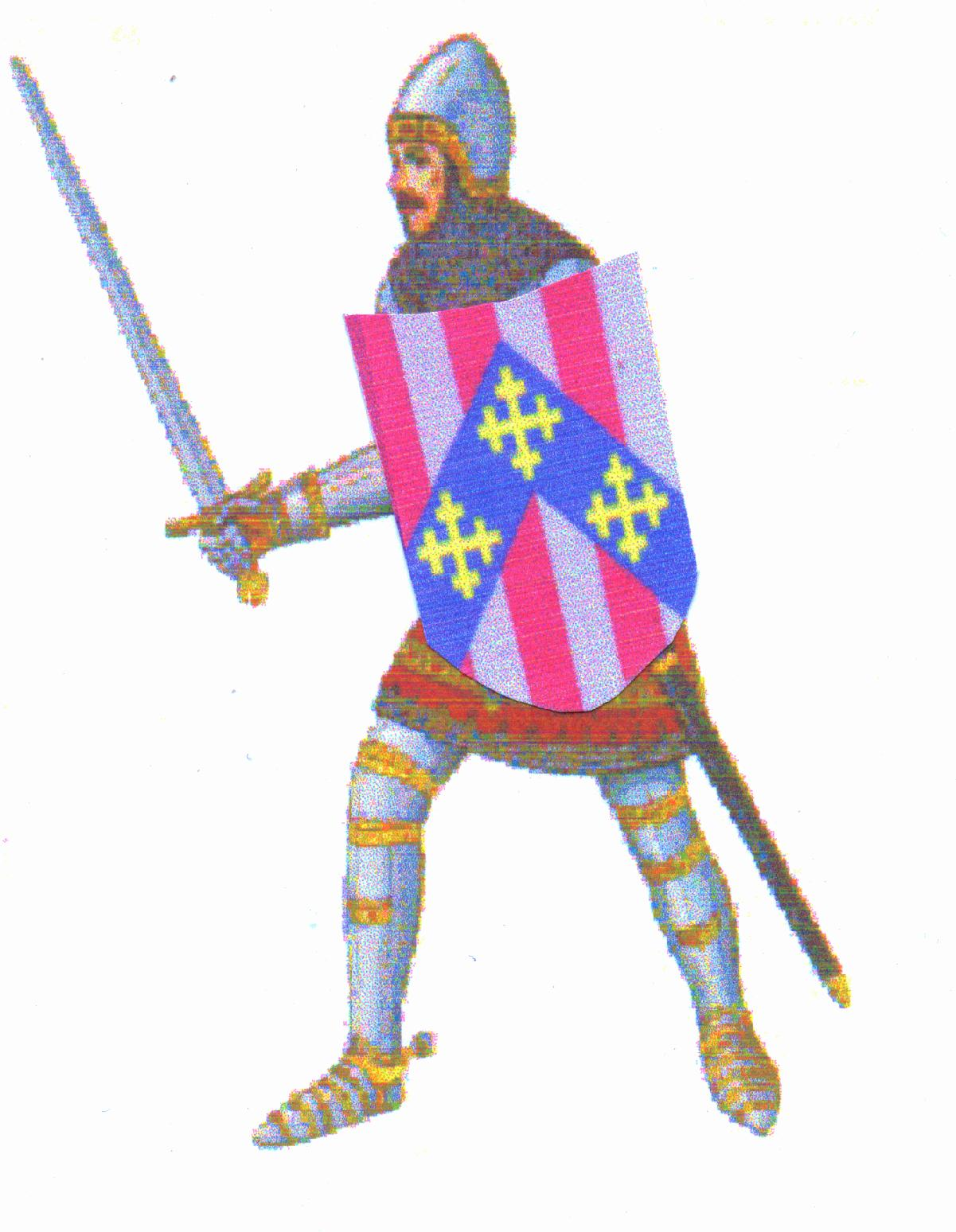
Sample of a medieval knight with an early Carpenter coat of arms on shield

Sir William Boyd Carpenter (1841–1918), an English clergyman of the Established church of England, Bishop of Ripon, afterwards a Canon of Westminster and Chaplain to the reigning sovereign of England, wrote in a letter dated 7 August 1907 that his family bore the Hereford Arms. Sir Noel Paton, upon painting the family arms, informed him that the supporters were originally a round-handled sword, which in drawing over time became shortened, until nothing but the cross and globe were left beneath it. Those Hereford Arms were used by "John Carpenter, town clerk of London, who died 1442 A. D." His grandson John Boyd-Carpenter, Baron Boyd-Carpenter (1908–1998), continued the Arms into the new century by passing it down to his son, Thomas Boyd-Carpenter, who was himself knighted after a military career as a Lieutenant-General and for public service.

There is no direct male-to-male Carpenter descent connecting Lord Carpenter and Sir William Boyd Carpenter. The family connection is by marriage through the females in the family.

The Hereford Coat of Arms described above should not be confused with the Arms of Bishop Richard Carpenter (c1450s?–1503) presented in the "Visitations of the County of Oxford taken in 1566, 1574, and 1634", published in 1871, which describe the arms displayed in the buildings at the University in Oxford – "In the Lyberarye of Baliall College" – as recorded by the officials performing the visitations in those years. The Visitations describe the arms of Richard Carpenter (theologian) as: "Paly of nine Gu. and Az. on a chevron Arg. surmounted by a mitre Or, three cross crosslets of—nine pales alternating red and blue, with a silver chevron bearing three gold cross-crosslets.

Parliament of Great Britain
Preceded by Robert Webb; Sir William Rowley	Member of Parliament for Taunton; 1754–1762; With: John Halliday 1754; Hon. Robert Maxwell 1754–1762	Succeeded by The Viscount Farnham; Laurence Sulivan
Peerage of Ireland
New creation	Earl of Tyrconnell; 1761–1762	Succeeded by George Carpenter
Preceded by George Carpenter	Baron Carpenter; 1749–1762	Succeeded by George Carpenter
