= Robert Webb (MP) =

British politician and plantation owner

Robert Webb (ca. 1719 – 9 September 1765) was a West Indies plantation owner and British politician who sat in the House of Commons between 1747 and 1754.

Webb was the eldest son of Nathaniel Webb, collector of customs at Montserrat, and his wife Bethiah Gerrish, daughter of William Gerrish of Montserrat. He entered Middle Temple in 1736 and was called to the bar in 1741. In 1741 he inherited his father's estates at Taunton. He became a member of Inner Temple in 1745. He was a prominent sugar merchant, owning plantations on Montserrat.

Webb was returned unopposed as Member of Parliament for Taunton on the dissenting interest at the 1747 general election. He was classed as a government supporter. At the 1754 general election he withdrew because he did not want the expense of a contest.

Webb died on 9 September 1765. His estates were inherited by his brother Nathaniel.

Parliament of Great Britain
Preceded by Percy Wyndham-O'Brien; Sir John Chapman	Member of Parliament for Taunton; 1747–1754; With: Sir Charles Wyndham (1747–1750); Admiral William Rowley (1750–1754)	Succeeded by John Halliday; Lord Carpenter
