= HMS Lively (1713) =

History

Great Britain
- Name: HMS Lively
- Ordered: 22 April 1712
- Builder: Royal Dockyard, Plymouth
- Launched: 28 May 1713
- Completed: 19 March 1715
- Commissioned: 1715
- Fate: Breaking completed at Portsmouth in December 1738

General characteristics
- Type: 20-gun Sixth Rate
- Tons burthen: 278 73/94 bm
- Length: 94 ft 10 in (28.9 m) gundeck; 76 ft 7 in (23.3 m) keel for tonnage
- Beam: 26 ft 0 in (7.9 m) for tonnage
- Depth of hold: 11 ft 6 in (3.5 m)
- Sail plan: ship-rigged
- Armament: 20 × 6-pdr 19 cwt guns on wooden trucks (UD)

HMS Lively was a member of the Gibraltar Group of 24-gun Sixth Rates. After commissioning she spent her career in Home waters on trade protection duties. She was broken in 1738.

Lively was the eighth named vessel since it was used for a 45-gun ship launched at Deptford in 1545, rebuilt 1558 and wrecked in 1563 off the Rye.

== Construction ==
She was ordered on 22 April 1712 from Plymouth Dockyard to be built under the guidance of John Phillips, Master Shipwright of Plymouth. She replaced a smaller Sixth Rate of 12 guns with the same name, which was sold in 1712. She was launched on 28 May 1713. She was completed for sea on 19 March 1715. Due to her completion in 1715 she would not carry the 4-pounder guns as they were removed from these ships in 1714.

== Commissioned service ==
She was commissioned in 1715 under the command of Captain St John Charlton, RN for service on the west coast of Scotland and Irish Waters. In 1720 she was under the command of Captain William Rowley, RN on the same service. She underwent a small repair at Plymouth costing £1,605.11.4d (Note: A total cost accounting for inflation of approximately £304,400 in today's money.) completed in August 1723. She returned to her previous service. In 1729 she underwent another small repair at Plymouth costing £559.19.8d, (Note: A total cost accounting for inflation of approximately £104,700 in today's money.) which was completed in May 1729. In January 1729 she had come under the command of Captain John Onley, RN, and she was deployed after her repairs to the Bristol Channel, moving to Irish Waters in 1732. With the court-martial of Captain Onley on 3 December 1738, she came under the command of Captain Edward Legge, RN, for service in the Bristol Channel. She was paid off on 21 November 1738.

== Disposition ==
HMS Lively was broken at Portsmouth by Admiralty Order (AO) 30 November 1738, completing in December 1738.
