= John Halliday (died 1754) =

British Member of Parliament (died 1754)

John Halliday (c. 1709–1754) was a British politician who sat in the House of Commons in 1754.

Halliday was the eldest son of John Halliday of Yard House and his wife Mary Trowbridge, daughter of Edmund Trowbridge of Lipyeate, Somerset. He married Mary Welman, daughter of Isaac Welman of Poundisford Park, Somerset in 1737. He was High Sheriff of Somerset in 1746-47

Halliday was returned unopposed for Taunton at the 1754 general election. He died a week after the new Parliament assembled on 8 June 1754, aged 44. He was succeeded by his son John who was also MP for Taunton.

Parliament of Great Britain
Preceded by Admiral William Rowley; Robert Webb	Member of Parliament for Taunton; 1754–1754; With: The Lord Carpenter	Succeeded by The Lord Carpenter; Robert Maxwell
