= Benjamin Hammet =

English businessman, banker and politician (1736-1800)

Sir Benjamin Hammet
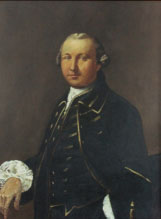

Member of Parliament for Taunton
- In office 20 March 1782 – 22 July 1800
- Preceded by: John Roberts
- Succeeded by: John Hammet

Personal details
- Born: Benjamin Hammet; 1736
- Died: 22 July 1800 (aged 63–64) Castle Malgwyn, Pembrokeshire, Great Britain
- Spouse: Louisa Esdaile
- Children: John
- Occupation: Businessman

Sir Benjamin Hammet (c. 1736 – 22 July 1800) was an English businessman, banker and politician, who served as Member of Parliament from Taunton (1782–1800), and as Sheriff of the City of London

== Background ==
Contemporary accounts state that he was a footman, son of a Taunton barber, who courted and married Louisa Esdaile, the sister-in-law of his master John 'Vulture' Hopkins. Louisa was the daughter of Sir James Esdaile, a rich banker; and Hammet's success as a banker and building contractor was credited to the influence and funding provided by his father-in-law, who on the occasion of their marriage settled £5,000 on the bride.

== Political career ==
In March 1782 Hammet entered Parliament in a by election for the seat of Taunton in Somerset.

Hammet was elected as Lord Mayor of London (a title which his father-in-law had held previously) in 1797, but paid a £1,000 penalty rather than serve (pleading ill health).

== Personal life ==
He died 22 July 1800 at Castle Malgwyn, his Welsh estate. Upon his death, his son John Hammet succeeded him as M.P., and would hold that seat until his own death in 1811.

Parliament of Great Britain
Preceded by John Roberts	Member of Parliament for Taunton; 1782–1800; With: John Halliday, Alexander Popham and William Morland	Succeeded by John Hammet
Civic offices
Preceded by James Fenn; Matthew Bloxam	Sheriff of the City of London; 1788; With: William Curtis, John Newman	Succeeded by William Newman; Thomas Baker
