= Petty treason =

Offence under the common law of England

Petty treason or petit treason was an offence under the common law of England in which a person killed or otherwise violated the authority of a social superior, other than the king. In England and Wales, petty treason ceased to be a distinct offence from murder by virtue of the Offences against the Person Act 1828. It was abolished in Ireland in 1829. It never existed in Scotland. It has also been abolished in other common-law countries.

== Element of betrayal ==
The element of betrayal is the reason why this crime was considered worse than an ordinary murder; medieval and post-medieval society rested on a framework in which each person had his or her appointed place and such murders were seen as threatening this framework. Many people had somebody subordinate to them and feared the consequences if the murder of superiors was not punished harshly.

== Codification in English law ==
The common law offence was codified in the Treason Act 1351. Under that Act, petty treason was an aggravated form of murder. It consisted of:

1. a wife killing her husband,
2. a clergyman killing his prelate,
3. a servant killing his master or mistress, or his master's wife.

The Act abolished three other forms of petty treason which had existed under common law:

1. a wife attempting to kill her husband,
2. a servant forging his master's seal, or
3. a servant committing adultery with his master's wife or daughter.

Counterfeiting gold or silver coin was also petty treason before the 1351 Act elevated this to high treason. However the method of execution was not changed.

== Penalty ==
The punishment for a man convicted of petty treason was to be drawn to the place of execution and hanged, but not quartered as in the case of high treason. The punishment for a woman was to be burned at the stake without being drawn there (the penalty for high treason was drawing and burning). In later years the law offered a modicum of mercy to women who were to be executed in this fashion: the executioner was equipped with a cord passed around the victim's throat and, standing outside of the fire, would pull it tight, strangling her before the flames could reach her. In a few instances, however, this could go wrong, with the cord burning through and the victim burning alive; the ensuing scandals contributed to the abolition of this punishment and its replacement by hanging in 1790.

== Defences and rules of procedure ==
The common law defence of provocation, by which a verdict of murder could be reduced to manslaughter, was also available in petty treason trials.

The rules of evidence and procedure in petty treason trials were the same as in high treason trials, except that the Treason Act 1695 did not apply to petty treason. Petty treason also differed from high treason in that the legal defence of benefit of clergy was available for petty treason until 1496, whereas it was never available for high treason.
