= Flyglobespan =

Scottish low cost airline

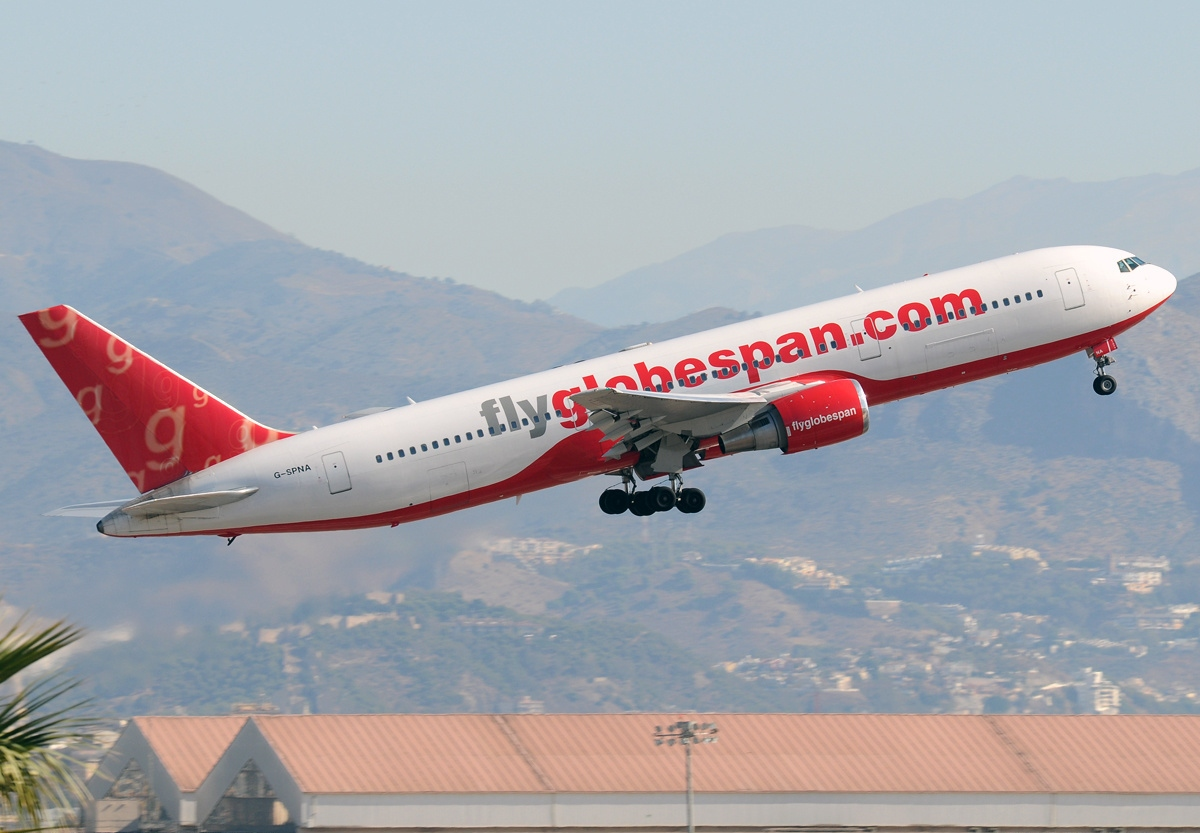
- Boeing 767-300ER
IATA	ICAO	Call sign
Y2	GSM	GLOBESPAN
- Founded: 7 November 2002
- Commenced operations: April 2003
- Ceased operations: 16 December 2009
- Operating bases: Aberdeen; Edinburgh; Glasgow; Liverpool
- Fleet size: 9
- Destinations: 24
- Parent company: Globespan Group plc
- Headquarters: Edinburgh, Scotland
- Key people: Tom Dalrymple, Chairman
- Website: flyglobespan.com

Flyglobespan was a Scottish low-cost airline based in Edinburgh. It operated scheduled services from five airports across Scotland, England and Ireland to destinations in Europe, North America, North Africa and South Africa. Its main bases were Glasgow, Edinburgh, Aberdeen and Liverpool airports. It was placed in administration on 16 December 2009 and later liquidated.

== History ==
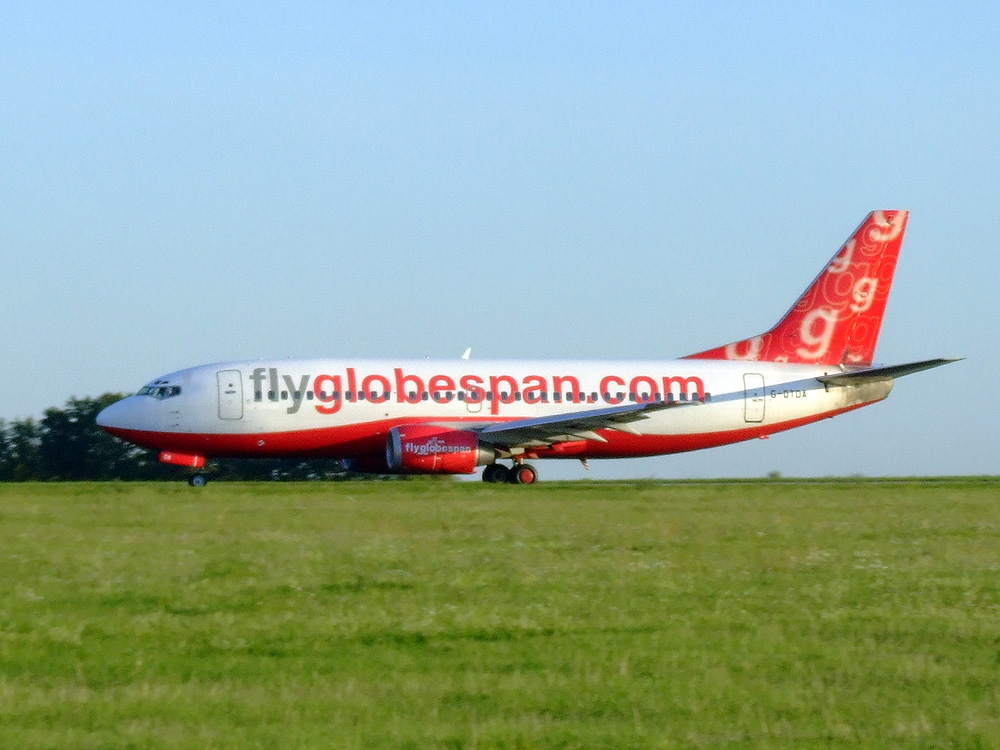
Boeing 737-300

Globespan, an Edinburgh-based tour operator with over 30 years' experience, already offered scheduled and charter flights, cruise travel, rail and coach travel, motorhome and car rental, and hotel accommodation tailored for holidaymakers visiting destinations in Canada, the United States and Spain. The scheduled flights, mainly to Canada, were operated by Air Transat from airports throughout the United Kingdom, with Globespan acting as the booking agent and selling the flights under its own brand. In summer 2002 a similar arrangement was trialled between Edinburgh and Nice, in the south of France. This was to prove successful for Globespan, and led to the creation of its own no-frills brand, 'Flyglobespan'. The offshoot proved successful and flight frequencies were increased. At this point, the operator relocated from Glasgow Prestwick Airport to the larger Glasgow Airport, which is much closer to the population centres of Central Scotland, within months of commencing operation.

Operations started in April 2003 using two Boeing 737-300 aircraft leased from Channel Express on scheduled services from Glasgow Prestwick and Edinburgh to five destinations in Spain, France and Italy. All the aircraft had Flyglobespan titles with red and white livery.

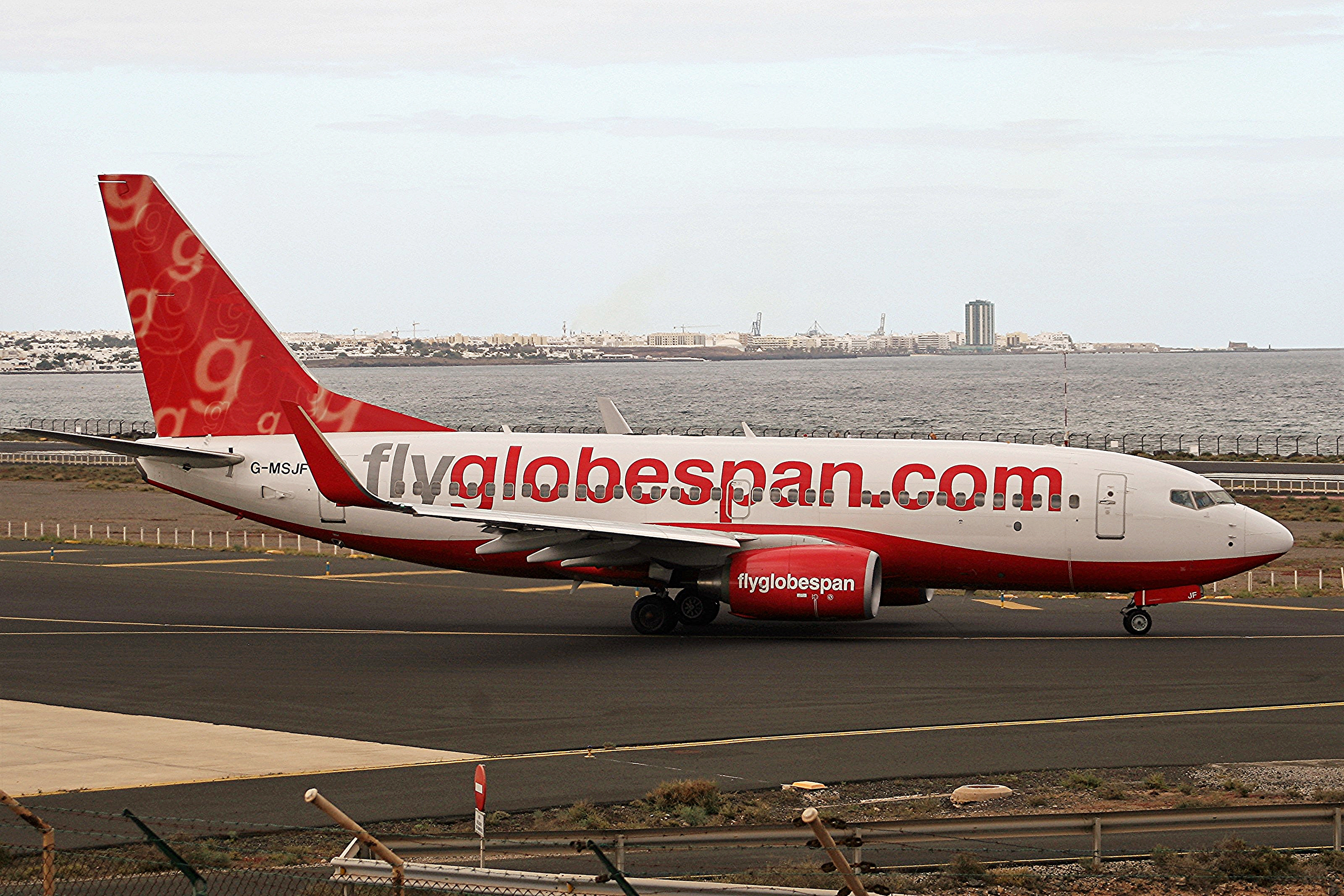
Boeing 737-700

So it could operate its own aircraft, in 2004 the Globespan Group bought the defunct operator Cougar Leasing along with its Civil Aviation Authority of the United Kingdom (CAA) Aircraft operating certificate. Now with its own licence, expansion was swift for the new airline. New destinations were added to the network, including Prague, where the airline faced competition from Czech Airlines, and further points in Spain, including the Canary Islands. CSA withdrew its Glasgow to Prague service on 1 August 2005.

By March 2005 the airline had grown to offer 15 destinations across Europe, with a fleet of nine aircraft—of which three were leased from new—and had tripled its passenger numbers to 1.5 million annually. Profits for the year ending October 2004 had risen from £2 million in its first year to £3.7 million, on a turnover of £98 million.

BBC's Watchdog programme featured the airline for a second time on 28 November 2007, where the airline was primarily featured for complaints due to a flight stopping 600 miles before its destination because the cabin crew were up to their safety limit in working hours. The CAA's suspension of the airline's ETOPS licence was also featured.

=== Domestic services ===
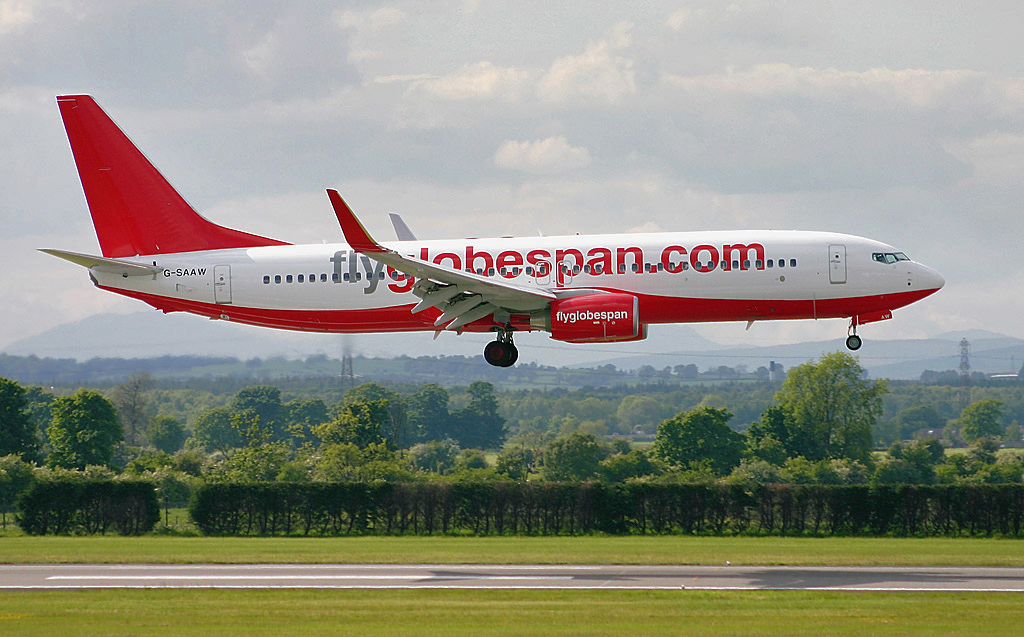
Boeing 737-800 at Glasgow Airport

In May 2005, the first domestic services were launched, with twice-daily flights from Glasgow and Edinburgh to London Stansted - routes that were already operated by the much larger low fares carrier easyJet, with much higher frequencies. These services were withdrawn in February 2006, together with plans to serve Bournemouth from Edinburgh.

=== Fuel costs ===
Despite high fuel costs and intense competition in the no-frills market, the airline continued to expand. Flights from London Stansted commenced in October 2005, though a new daily service between Glasgow and Amsterdam, replacing the twice-daily easyJet service between the two cities, was withdrawn in June 2006 due to low passenger numbers.

On 1 November 2005, Flyglobespan announced its first long-haul service, from Glasgow to Orlando Sanford International Airport in Florida, United States. The service commenced in June 2006 and was operated by a Boeing 767 aircraft in a three-class configuration. The three classes were Economy, Premium Economy and Business Class which included 50-inch sleeper seats, gourmet food, and wines. Alicante and Málaga services were upgraded to twice-daily throughout the summer for 2006, and Murcia was served daily. Fuerteventura was added to the winter 2006 schedule. Weekly services linking Glasgow with Athens and Heraklion were launched in May 2006 for the summer season.

In June 2006, the airline announced plans to operate from Aberdeen Airport after 24-hour airport operation there had been confirmed. The first route to operate from Aberdeen was Tenerife, which commenced in winter 2006. It also announced routes to Alicante, Barcelona, Faro, Murcia, Palma and Paphos, which commenced in summer 2007.

=== Long-haul expansion ===
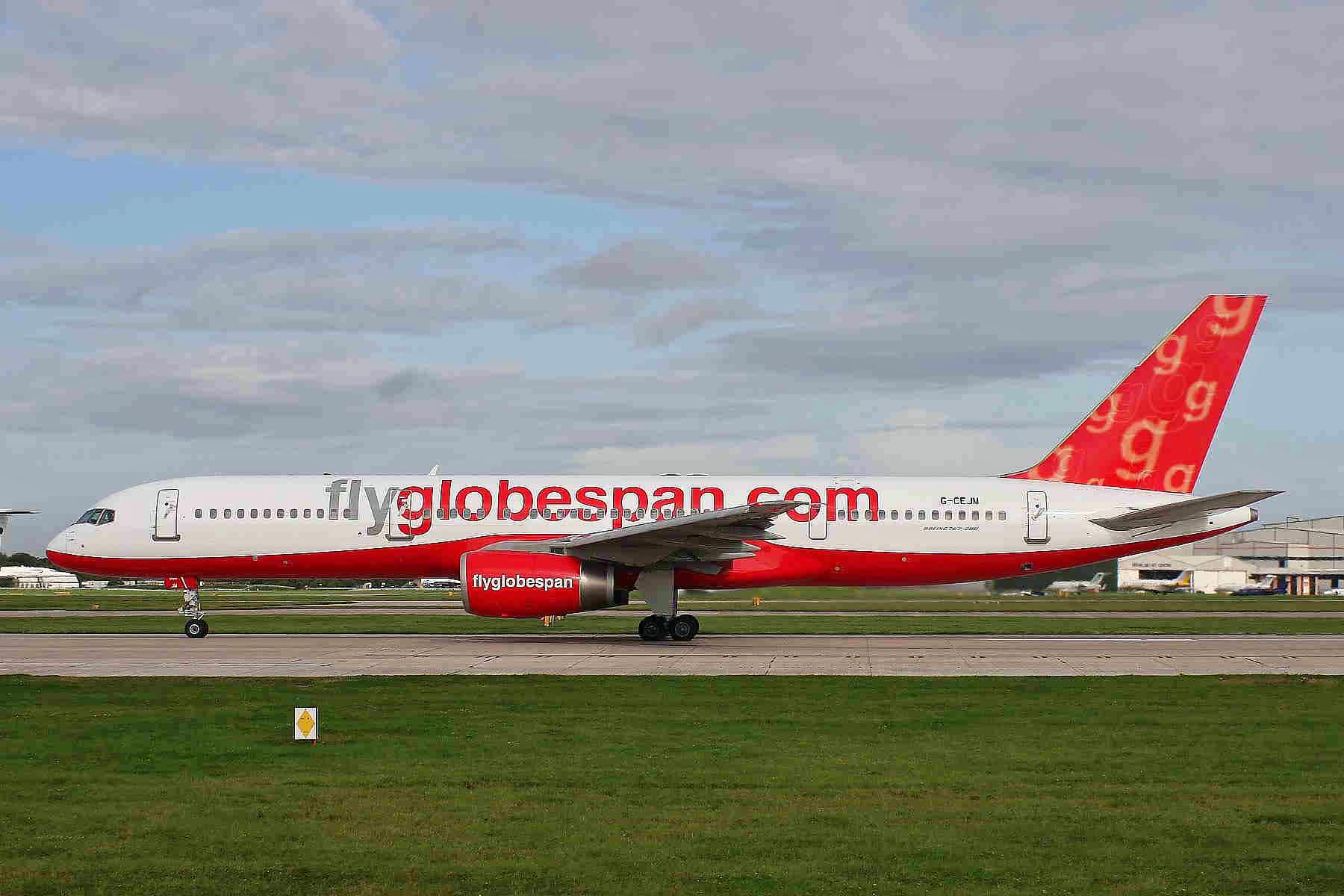
Boeing 757-200 at Manchester Airport on 2 September 2008

Liverpool was added to the Flyglobespan network from November 2006, with flights to Tenerife. The airline began Liverpool's first long-haul flight, to New York (John F Kennedy International Airport), using Boeing 757-200 aircraft, daily in May 2007. However, after a series of problems with the service, due largely to reliability problems with the route's sole aircraft which resulted in frequent major delays on the service, Flyglobespan announced in early July that they would abandon the route in October of the same year, only six months after its inception.

Flights to Hamilton, Ontario, Canada from Manchester started in November, with two of the three weekly flights. It also commenced a three times a week service from Manchester to Cape Town, South Africa on 4 November 2006, but this service was withdrawn at the end of the 2007 summer season.

Flyglobespan started new services in May 2007 from Hamilton/John C. Munro International Airport, Canada to destinations in the UK and Ireland, including Doncaster-Sheffield Airport; this was the first scheduled transatlantic flight to operate from the airport. Hamilton Airport is located between Toronto and nearby Niagara Falls, about 75 kilometres southwest, or an hour's drive from, Toronto's main Pearson International Airport. Hamilton Airport is about one hour away from Toronto's city centre whereas Pearson International Airport is about thirty minutes away.

Flyglobespan commenced services in May 2007 from Ireland West Airport to John F. Kennedy International Airport with three services a week, and Boston Logan International Airport twice a week. Some flights from Knock to New York made unscheduled refuelling stops at a number of remote locations including Keflavik, Iceland (though this is an exception, when they stopped at a major hub); Bangor, Maine; Stephenville and St. John's, Newfoundland. These refuelling stops were scheduled when a 737-800 was used instead of the usual 757-200.

In 2007, Flyglobespan had its Skytrax rating withdrawn and suspended, owing to "product and service inconsistency". The airline did not regain its rating.

=== Financial difficulties ===
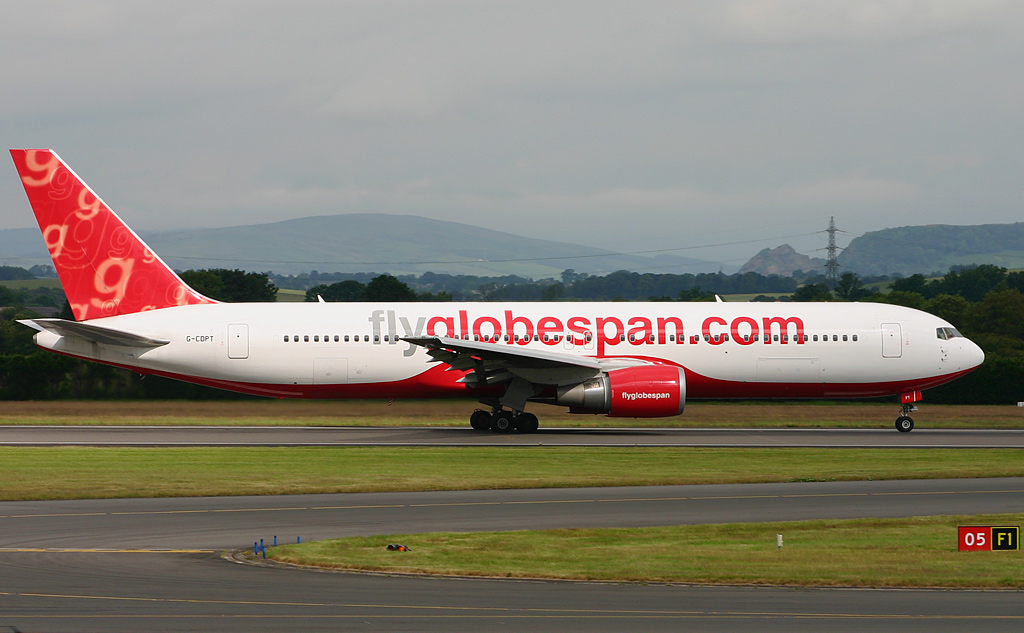
Boeing 767-300ER at Glasgow Airport

In July 2008, Globespan lost its ability to get insurance industry credit card repayment cover, before the collapse of Zoom and XL. From that point, credit card clearing company E-Clear, whose CEO was Elias Elia, rather than paying the normal amounts of cash to Globespan, argued that in certain cases passengers could make valid claims against them via the credit card companies up to six months after having taken their flight. E-Clear hence held a greater amount of money paid through them to Globespan.

By October 2009, the amount of money owed by E-Clear to Globespan was in dispute; Globespan later claimed it to be £35m. After various discussions, Globespan asked E-Clear to agree to independent audit of the sums, which was turned down by E-Clear. Also at this point, Halcyon Investments—the operational arm of an August 2008 Jersey-based trust fund—offered to make a large investment in Globespan. Halcyon's investors included Elias Elia.

In November 2009, The Independent on Sunday reported that Flyglobespan had required a 'last-ditch cash injection' as a result of cash flow difficulties caused following delays in payment by a credit card clearing company, E-Clear.

Concerns regarding the future of the airline resurfaced on 13 December 2009 when several newspapers reported that Flyglobespan had so far been unsuccessful in obtaining regulatory approval for the funding package from Halcyon Investments. The Guardian suggested that Halcyon Investments was controlled by E-Clear. The company stated it had "secured a financial investment package that will see Scotland's leading airline continue to prosper and grow".

=== End of operation ===
The Globespan Group PLC, Globespan Airways Ltd. and Alba Ground Handling Limited ceased operations on 16 December 2009 and were placed into administration on 17 December with PwC appointed as the administrator. The last flight was GSM706 from Hurghada to Glasgow which landed at 2230 on 16 December. Approximately 4,500 passengers were left stranded.

On 19 January 2010, a High Court judge granted an administration order, following a request from PWC, against credit card processing firm E-Clear UK which handled all of Globespan's credit card transactions.

PwC administrator Bruce Cartwright, stated after E-Clear UK's administration that it was clear the funds withheld from the Globespan Group were no longer there.

== Destinations ==
It was announced in July 2007 that the Liverpool to New York and the Ireland West Airport service would be suspended for the winter season from 30 October. The company gave the reason as poor passenger figures on the Liverpool flights, particularly inbound passengers from the United States. The passenger figures for Ireland West Airport were higher than expected. The company also admitted to providing a poor operating service since the route was launched on 25 May 2007, which affected the passenger figures. The route was to recommence for the Summer 2008 season. The poor operating service was compounded by some PR failures and sub-standard customer service.

On 18 October 2007, the CAA suspended Flyglobespan's ETOPS certificate, the first time in 15 years a UK operator has lost ETOPS approval. This effectively meant Flyglobespan transatlantic flights were forced to adopt a flight path which never took the aircraft more than an hour away from the nearest airport, in case of engine problems. However, this only applied to Flyglobespan's own aircraft and leased-in aircraft could continue to follow ETOPS rules as these are operated by other airlines with their own ETOPS approval. Flyglobespan's ETOPS rating was reinstated at a CAA hearing on 26 October 2007.

Flyglobespan operated services to the Falkland Islands and Ascension Island on behalf of the UK Government. This was in support of the military and civilian communities of those islands, and involved long-haul flights between RAF Brize Norton in Oxfordshire, RAF Ascension Island, and RAF Mount Pleasant on East Falkland. These flights were taken over by Air Italy on a temporary basis, before another airline puts in for a permanent basis.

The company also operated flights for the UK Ministry of Defence between RAF Brize Norton and staging posts in the Middle East in support of the operations in Afghanistan and Iraq.

== Statistics ==
	Number of Passengers	Number of Flights	Load Factor
2005	929,552	7,952	79.2%
2006	1,489,377	11,625	82.5%
2007	2,060,727	15,980	82.2%
2008	1,634,900	12,197	79.6%
^{Source: UK Civil Aviation Authority}

== Fleet ==
The fleet included the following aircraft as of 16 December 2009 prior to ceasing operations:

Aircraft	In fleet	Orders	Passengers	Remarks
Boeing 737-300	6	0	142 & 148	2 were leased from Air Atlanta Icelandic
Boeing 737-700	2	0	148	
Boeing 737-800	5	0	189	
Boeing 757-200	3	0	189	2 were wet leased from Icelandair in 2007
Boeing 767-300ER	6	0	276	2 were wet leased from Neos in 2007
Boeing 787-8	0	2		Were to be leased from International Lease Finance Corporation, order cancelled
Total	13	2		

Flyglobespan announced in August 2006 that it would lease two Boeing 787-8s from the International Lease Finance Corporation for ten years, to be delivered in March and November 2011. Due to the administration placed on 16 December 2009, the order was cancelled.

== See also ==
- List of defunct airlines of the United Kingdom
