= Oasis Hong Kong Airlines =

Low-cost airline based in Hong Kong

Oasis Hong Kong Airlines 甘泉香港航空
IATA	ICAO	Call sign
O8	OHK	OASIS
- Founded: February 2005
- Ceased operations: 9 April 2008
- Hubs: Hong Kong International Airport
- Headquarters: Hong Kong
- Key people: Stephen H. Miller, (CEO) Rev. Raymond C. Lee & Priscilla H. Lee, (Chairman and Executive Director)

Oasis Hong Kong Airlines
- Chinese: 甘泉香港航空
Transcriptions
Standard Mandarin
- Hanyu Pinyin: Gānquán Xiānggǎng Hángkōng
Yue: Cantonese
- Yale Romanization: Gām chyùhn hēung góng hòhng hūng
- Jyutping: Gam^{1} cyun^{4} hoeng^{1} gong^{2} hong^{4} hung^{1}

Oasis Hong Kong Airlines Limited (Chinese: 甘泉香港航空公司) was a long-haul, low-cost Asian airline. It operated scheduled services to London Gatwick and Vancouver from its hub, Hong Kong International Airport. The airline offered low fares as its selling technique, which was similar to the operation principle of a low-cost airline.

Oasis was one of a growing number of long-haul passenger airlines, such as Zoom Airlines, to adopt a budget airline model pioneered by the now defunct Laker Airways Skytrain service in the 1970s. Oasis offered non-stop service from Hong Kong to London, and began a service to Vancouver on 28 June 2007. The airline was voted "World's Leading New Airline" at the Annual World Travel Awards 2007.

Much of the original success of Oasis Hong Kong was due to the airline's widely advertised minimum fares beginning at just GBP£75 one way. However, fares later became much less competitive.

On 9 April 2008, Oasis's CEO Stephen Miller announced at a press conference that the company would cease operations after suffering an accumulated loss of HK$1 billion (US$128 million) since its launch in October 2006. Accounting firm KPMG was appointed provisional liquidator by the airline.

== History ==
Oasis Hong Kong Airlines was founded by Rev. Raymond C. Lee, and his wife, Priscilla H. Lee in February 2005. The chief executive, Steve Miller, was founder and first chief executive of another Hong Kong-based airline, Dragonair. Its inaugural route to London commenced service on 26 October 2006, The first flight, flight O8 700, took off from Hong Kong International Airport after a 24-hour delay. The airline had been scheduled to begin operations on 25 October, but Russia revoked the London-bound flight's fly-over rights at 12:09 pm, one hour before the flight's scheduled departure.

Oasis originally operated as a low-fare airline, and claimed that it had already broken-even after the first six months of operations. The airline said that this was achieved through flying long-haul so as to decrease maintenance and fuel costs. It also has a lower cost per passenger-kilometer compared to other airlines in Hong Kong. Business passengers, and those who used to have to transfer en route to get to London, would be Oasis' main sources of revenue. Like many other airlines, Oasis planned to hedge a proportion of its fuel purchases to guard against future fuel price increases.

Oasis's subsequent liquidation proved the airline's unviability in practice. In an attempt to be competitive, the airline offered lower than sustainable fares leading to rapidly accumulating losses. Oasis also faced stiff competition by a number of well established carriers operating on its Hong Kong-London route including Cathay Pacific, British Airways, Qantas, Air New Zealand and Virgin Atlantic, and by the fact that its competitors flew into the more convenient and centrally located Heathrow while Oasis was consigned to Gatwick.

Oasis Hong Kong Airlines was liquidated on 9 April 2008. The last flight, flight O8 901, departed from Vancouver at 10:15 am and arrived at Hong Kong at 3:09 pm. Liquidator KPMG announced the liquidation at 2:00 pm on that day and over the following few days it would conduct a search for potential buyers for the airline.

On 8 July 2008, it was announced that unsecured creditors of collapsed Oasis Hong Kong Airlines, including ticket holders, will eventually receive no more than 10 percent of what they are owed, according to the airline's provisional liquidator, KPMG.

On 16 September 2008, this estimate was reduced to 'less than 5%'. No timetable was given for distribution of these funds.

== Services ==
Tickets were sold through the company website and travel agents. One-way fares between Hong Kong and London were launched from £75 or HK$1,000 (excluding taxes and charges), but there were actually four fare classes. As time went on fares became uncompetitive with airlines such as Air New Zealand and British Airways offering full-service for a similar price and flying from the more convenient Heathrow and supply varied from time to time.

Seat pitch of economyOasis was 32" (the same as Cathay Pacific and Air Canada; one inch more than British Airways and Virgin Atlantic), and a businessOasis section offered at least 50" seat pitch. The 747-400 cabins were configured for 81 business and 278 economy passengers or 71 business and 268 economy passengers, in which a section of what were First Class seats were sold as Business Class.

Two hot meals and soft drinks were served free on both long haul routes in all classes. Snacks and alcoholic drinks were also free for business class passengers and available to be ordered in economy. Free headphones, blankets and pillows were also distributed in all classes, while passengers could purchase noise-canceling headphones and amenity kits on board. Each passenger had personal seat-back TV which had at least 16 channels available, in addition to up to 12 channels of audio, although these were not on demand.

On 28 February 2007, Oasis Hong Kong moved all its passenger check-in operation into the newly commissioned Terminal 2 of the Hong Kong International Airport, being the first airline in Hong Kong to do so.

== Destinations ==
The airline originally operated on two routes, from Hong Kong to London Gatwick and Vancouver. It expected to introduce a six-weekly service to Vancouver, the focus city of another low-cost carrier WestJet, from 28 June 2007. The airline's press release which stated that "it's a market where there is substantially less reliance on feeder traffic" suggested nothing about the WestJet connectivity. It was also believed that the long-awaited Oakland service (near San Francisco) would soon come on line once the Vancouver service was established. Other routes were also planned to Sacramento Airport and Sydney. Oasis is believed to have wanted to commence service to Chicago and New York before reaching Washington DC.

On 17 August 2007, Oasis Hong Kong Airlines expressed its interest to provide service to many destinations in Europe and Asia on the HKSAR Government website, and on 7 September 2007 expressed its interest in providing services to six destinations in North America.

== Fleet ==
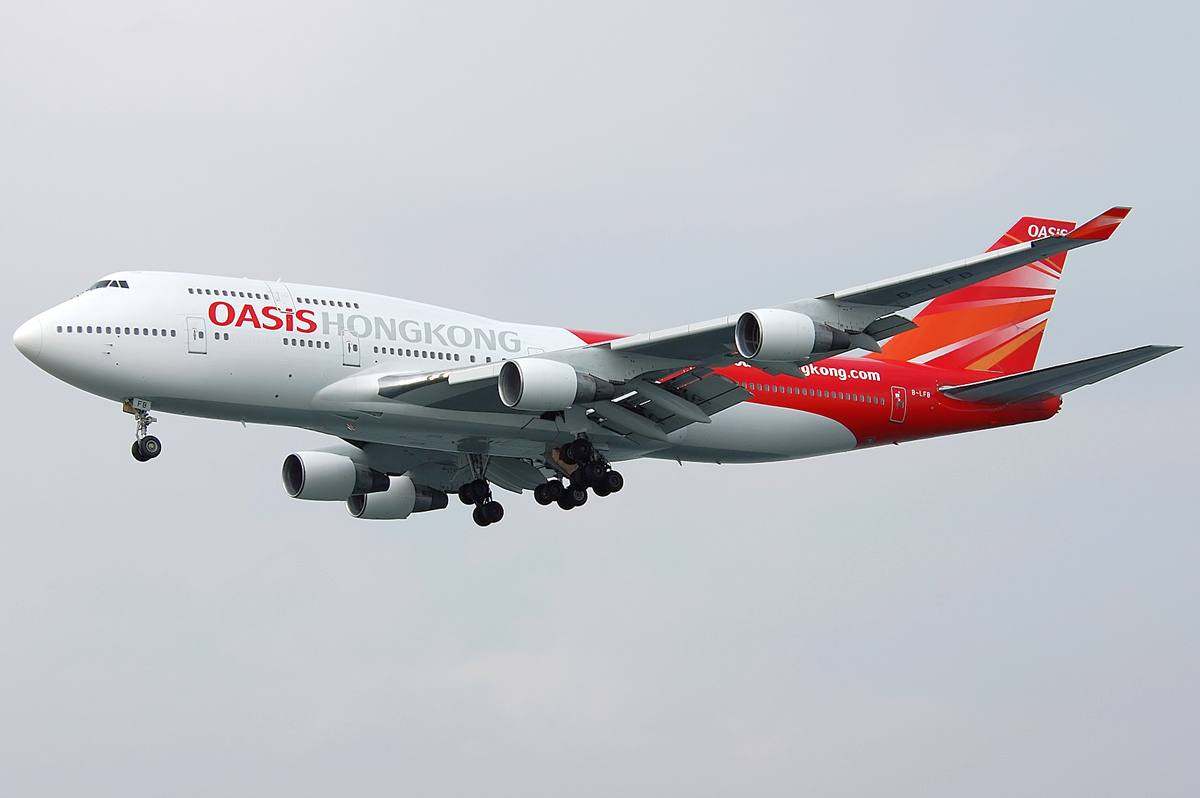
An Oasis Hong Kong Airlines Boeing 747-400 at Chek Lap Kok Airport in 2007

The Oasis Hong Kong Airlines fleet consisted of the following aircraft:

At the time operations ceased, Oasis Hong Kong Airlines operated four Boeing 747-400s.

== Awards ==
In 2007, Oasis Hong Kong was voted "World's Leading New Airline" and "Asia's Leading Budget/No Frills Airline" at the Annual World Travel Awards 2007. It was also named "New Airline of the Year" by the Centre for Asia Pacific Aviation of Australia, and was voted "Best New Service" and "Best Business Class Carrier" at the 2007 World Low Cost Airline Congress Awards held in London.
