= ZX =

ZX may refer to:

== Arts and entertainment ==
- Kamen Rider ZX (pronounced "Zed-Cross"), the tenth fictional superhero in the "Kamen Rider" franchise
- Mega Man ZX, a video game for the Nintendo DS
- ZX Tunes, remastered soundtracks of the "Mega Man ZX" game
- Z/X, Japanese collectible card game

== Science ==
- ZX-calculus, in quantum computing, a graphical language for reasoning about linear maps between qubits

== Technology ==
- Chinasat, a family of communications satellites (from the transliteration, Zhongxing)
- Walkman ZX Series, a series of digital audio players made by Sony
- ZX80, ZX81 and ZX Spectrum, home computers produced by Sinclair

== Transport ==
- ZX Auto, also known as Zitsubishi, a Chinese SUV and truck manufacturer
- ZXMOTO, a Chinese motorcycle manufacturer.
- Citroën ZX, a car model
- Nissan 300ZX, a car model
- Kawasaki Ninja series motorcycles (model designation codes ZX and ZX-R)
- Air Georgian (IATA airline code ZX, 1994–2020)
- Zoom Airlines Limited, the British subsidiary of Canadian airline Zoom Airlines (IATA airline code ZX, 2006–2008)
