= Elias Elia =

Elias Elia may refer to:

- Elias Elia (footballer) (born 1985), Cypriot footballer
- Elias Elia (businessman), Greek Cypriot businessman
