= Reginald Wells-Pestell, Baron Wells-Pestell =

British politician

Reginald Alfred Wells-Pestell, Baron Wells-Pestell, CBE (27 January 1910 – 17 January 1991) was a British social worker and Labour Party politician.

Born Reginald Pestell, he obtained a diploma in economic and social sciences from the University of London before working as a probation officer for fifteen years. During World War II he served in the Home Guard as weapons training officer.

In 1946 he entered local politics when he was elected to both Stoke Newington Borough Council and the London County Council. He served as Mayor of Stoke Newington for 1947–49.

He made four unsuccessful attempts to enter the House of Commons. At the 1950 and 1951 general elections he stood at Hornsey and at the 1955 general election at Taunton. His final attempt was at the 1956 Taunton by-election, when he fell 657 votes short of a majority over the Conservative winner, Edward du Cann.

He moved to Suffolk and became a member of East Suffolk County Council. He was created a life peer on 10 May 1965 taking the title Baron Wells-Pestell, of Combs in the County of Suffolk. He had married Irene Wells in 1935, and combined their surnames in his title, also taking the name of the Suffolk village in which he lived. He was a spokesman in the Lords for the Department of Health and Social Security in 1979, subsequently becoming a junior whip when the Labour Party went into opposition. From 1981 he was a Deputy Speaker of the House of Lords. He was appointed CBE in the 1988 Birthday Honours for services to Parliamentary Committees.

He died, aged 80, a few hours after his wife.
