= 1956 Taunton by-election =

UK Parliamentary by-election

The 1956 Taunton by-election was held on 14 February 1956. It was held due to the elevation to a hereditary peerage of the Conservative MP, Henry Hopkinson. The seat was retained by the Conservative candidate Edward du Cann, albeit with a narrow majority of 657 votes.

By-election 14 February 1956: Taunton
Party	Candidate	Votes	%	±%
Conservative	Edward du Cann	19,820	50.84	−1.27
Labour	Reginald Alfred Pestell	19,163	49.16	+9.63
Majority		657	1.68	−10.90
Turnout		38,983		
Conservative hold		Swing		
