= Zoom Airlines =

Canadian low-fare transatlantic airline

Zoom Airlines Inc.

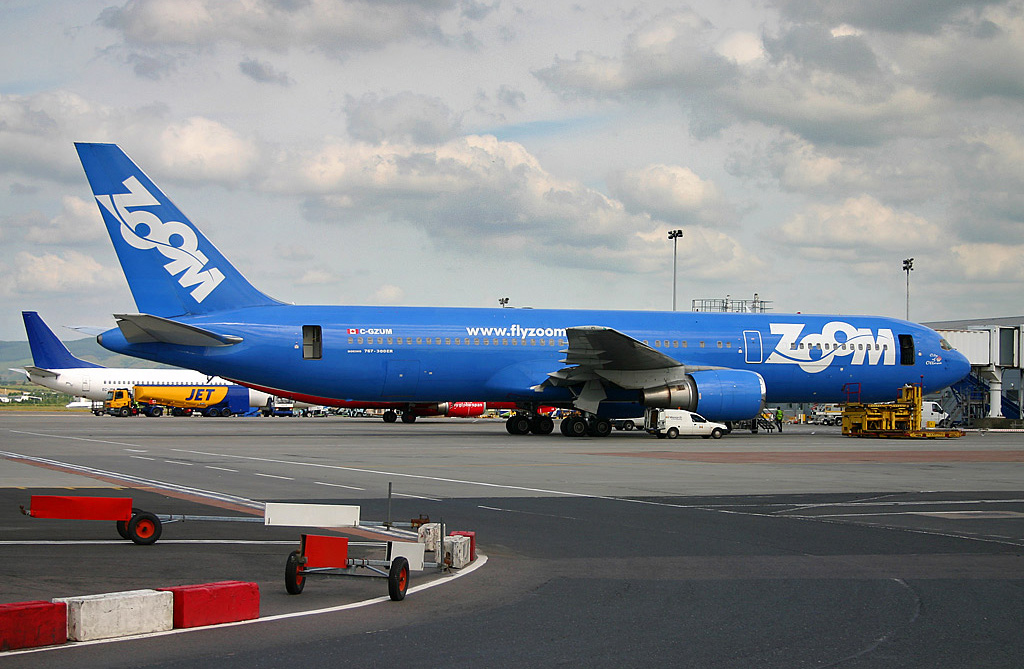
- Zoom Airlines Boeing 767 at Glasgow Airport
IATA	ICAO	Call sign
Z4	OOM	ZOOM
- Founded: May 2002
- Ceased operations: August 28, 2008
- Fleet size: 5
- Destinations: 25
- Headquarters: Ottawa, Ontario
- Key people: Hugh Boyle, John Boyle, Margaret Matheson, Ian Dodd and Kris Dolinki

Zoom Airlines Inc. was a Canadian low-fare scheduled transatlantic airline with its headquarters in the Place Bell Canada building in Ottawa, Ontario. Zoom operated year-round scheduled services to Europe, and charter services to South America, Caribbean, and Southern United States destinations with Canadian tour operators.

Zoom ceased all operations and filed for bankruptcy protection on August 28, 2008 because of its deteriorating financial position. Zoom Airlines was organised as two units - Zoom Airlines Ltd., administered by PKF, and Zoom Airlines Inc with Doyle Salewski Inc as trustees.

== History ==
Zoom Airlines Inc. was founded in May 2002 as a charter airline serving Go Travel Direct to the Caribbean, using aircraft from FirstAir and Monarch Airlines. It would later become a low-fare transatlantic airline. The carrier, based in Canada's capital city, Ottawa, was conceived by two Scottish brothers, John and Hugh Boyle, to fill an opportunity in the Canadian leisure travel market.

The brothers entered the holiday business in the 1980 with their startup company Falcon Holidays in their native Scotland, which was later sold for a large profit to a major United Kingdom tour operator.

Their next venture, Direct Holidays, was started in 1991 and gained strength and market share in Scotland, becoming a household name and the largest 'direct sell' travel company in the UK.

After the sale of Direct Holidays in 1998 to MyTravel Group for £84m (C$200 million), Hugh relocated to Canada. Boyle started GO Travel Direct Vacations, introducing the 'direct sell' method. This business model eliminates the role of travel agents, passing the savings back to the holiday maker. In taking this business model one step further, Boyle launched Zoom Airlines, removing the remaining third parties from the booking process.

In November 2006, Zoom Airlines and Flyglobespan.com embarked on a codeshare agreement. Zoom Airlines operated two of three weekly Manchester to Toronto Flyglobespan flights. Zoom flights from Toronto to Belfast, Cardiff, Glasgow, London Gatwick, London Stansted and Manchester were available for booking on the Flyglobespan website, as well as Ottawa to London Gatwick. This agreement was only for the 2006/2007 winter season, as Flyglobespan subsequently commenced their own Canadian program.

In the summer of 2006, John Boyle founded a sister company in the UK known as Zoom Airlines Limited. It operated until 28 August 2008, when it ceased trading along with the original Canadian company.

In January 2008, Zoom Airlines Inc received approval from the Canadian Minister of Transport, Lawrence Cannon, to operate flights between Canada and Italy.

== 2008 financial difficulties ==
On August 27, 2008, an aircraft leased to Zoom was grounded at Calgary International Airport when the owner cancelled the lease agreement. The fuel supplier would not refuel the aircraft due to outstanding debts. Zoom subsequently announced it had requested creditor protection.

=== Administration ===
On August 28, 2008, a Boeing 757 aircraft was held at Glasgow Airport because of the airline's financial difficulties. It was reported that the aircraft was impounded after the airline failed to pay its air traffic control charges. An aircraft at Cardiff Airport was also grounded as the aircraft being used to perform the flight had been impounded before scheduled take off. Shortly afterwards, the airline announced that it had filed for administration under the Canadian Companies Creditors Arrangement Act and that it was ceasing operations.

On the same day shortly after C-GZNA had departed London Gatwick for Bermuda/Fort Lauderdale under the command of Captain Tony Hampson and Senior First Officer Howard Barnard the company's sister airline filed for bankruptcy under the British legal system in August 2008. The company failed to hedge its pre-sold low cost service against globally rising fuel prices. Zoom Airlines is reported to have blamed the "horrendous" price of aviation fuel and the wider economic slowdown.

== Re-launch as XPO Airlines ==
On January 14, 2009, Globe Span Capital announced the acquisition of Zoom Airlines Inc. A plan was in place to get the new Zoom off the ground in early 2009. The Kingston, Ontario, based financial services company planned to relocate Zoom Airlines' finance, human resources and call-centre divisions to Kingston. The operation centre of the airline was to remain in Toronto. On 25 March 2009, a website was launched for the new airline, XPO Airlines. The executives at Globe Span had planned to use the Zoom Airlines brand name, but chose to change to the name XPO, meaning Cross Pacific Ocean.

In May 2009, XPO announced a planned focus on the Canada-Asia market with a revised launch date of late 2009 or early 2010. However, by August 2010, the website was shut down and as of May 2020, the website, flyxpo.com is offline. In February 2018, XPO Airlines was in advanced stages of talks with investors, hoping to raise a total of about $18,000,000 CAD by the end of the fiscal year of 2018.

== Destinations ==
=== Europe ===
- France
  - Paris (Charles de Gaulle Airport)
- Italy
  - Rome (Rome Fiumicino Airport) (seasonal)
- Netherlands
  - Amsterdam (Amsterdam Airport Schiphol)
- United Kingdom
  - England
    - London (London Gatwick Airport)
    - London (London Stansted Airport)
    - Manchester (Manchester Airport)
  - Northern Ireland
    - Belfast (Belfast International Airport)
  - Scotland
    - Glasgow (Glasgow Airport)
  - Wales
    - Cardiff (Cardiff Airport)

=== North America ===
- Canada
  - Alberta
    - Calgary (Calgary International Airport)
    - Edmonton (Edmonton International Airport)
  - British Columbia
    - Abbotsford (Abbotsford International Airport)
    - Vancouver (Vancouver International Airport)
  - Manitoba
    - Winnipeg (Winnipeg James Armstrong Richardson International Airport)
  - Nova Scotia
    - Halifax (Halifax Stanfield International Airport)
  - Ontario
    - Hamilton (John C. Munro Hamilton International Airport)
    - Ottawa (Ottawa Macdonald–Cartier International Airport)
    - Toronto (Toronto Pearson International Airport)
  - Quebec
    - Montreal (Montréal-Pierre Elliott Trudeau International Airport)
- United States ^{*}
  - Fort Lauderdale (Fort Lauderdale-Hollywood International Airport) seasonal
  - New York City (John F. Kennedy International Airport)
  - San Diego (San Diego International Airport)

=== Caribbean ===
- Barbados (Grantley Adams International Airport)
- Bermuda (L.F. Wade International Airport)
- Grenada (Point Salines International Airport)
- Jamaica (Norman Manley International Airport)
- Trinidad (Piarco International Airport)

=== South America ===
- Guyana (Cheddi Jagan International Airport)

== Fleet ==
As of September 2008 the fleet consisted of:

Zoom Airlines fleet
Aircraft	Total	Passengers (*W/Y)	Registration	Name	Year built
Boeing 757-200	2	205 (45/160); 202 (42/160)	C-GTSN; C-GTDX	City of Montreal; City of Toronto	1990; 1990
Boeing 767-300ER	3	269 (62/207); 270 (63/207); 269 (62/207)	C-GZMM; C-GZUM; C-GZNC	City of Ottawa; City of Vancouver; City of Calgary (Changes between Halifax)	1993; 1995; 1993

^{*W Premium Economy offered only on select flights.}

- As of August 2008, the average age of the Zoom Airlines Inc. fleet was 15.9 years.

== See also ==
- List of defunct airlines of Canada
