= Baron Colyton =

Title in the Peerage of the United Kingdom

The title of Baron Colyton, of Farway in County of Devon and of Taunton in the County of Somerset, is a title in the Peerage of the United Kingdom. It was created on 19 January 1956 for the diplomat and Conservative politician Henry Lennox D'Aubigne Hopkinson, 1st Baron Colyton. He notably served as Minister of State for the Colonies from 1952 to 1955. He resided at Netherton Hall in the parish of Farway, Devon. As of As of 2010, the title is held by his grandson, the second Baron, who succeeded in 1996.

== Barons Colyton (1956) ==
- Henry Lennox D'Aubigne Hopkinson, 1st Baron Colyton (1902–1996)
- Alisdair John Munro Hopkinson, 2nd Baron Colyton (b. 1958)

The heir apparent is the present holder's son, Hon. James Patrick Munro Hopkinson (b. 1983).

=== Line of Succession ===
Crest: A demi-lion Sable between two mullets of six points Or. Escutcheon: Azure on a chevron Argent between three mullets of six points Or as many mascles Gules a bordure engrailed Or. Supporters: On either side an angel Proper habited Azure winged Or the dexter holding in the exterior hand a Saxon crown and the sinister likewise holding a trumpet Gold. Motto: Look Forward.Henry Lennox D'Aubigne Hopkinson, 1st Baron Colyton (1902—1996) Badge: In front of a portcullis chained Or a grasshopper Proper.

  - Hon. Nicholas Henry Eno Hopkinson (1932—1991)
    - Alisdair John Munro Hopkinson, 2nd Baron Colyton (born 1958)

Alisdair John Munro Hopkinson, 2nd Baron Colyton

      - (1) Hon. Hon. James Patrick Munro Hopkinson (b. 1983)
      - (2) Hon. Thomas Charles Robert Hopkinson (b. 1985)
    - (3) Charles Henry Kenneth Hopkinson (b. 1960)
      - (4) Frederick Nicholas Hugo Hopkinson (b. 1990)
      - (5) Henry Jonathan Arthur Hopkinson (b. 1992)

== Arms ==
Coat of arms of Baron Colyton
| Crest A demi-lion Sable between two mullets of six points Or. Escutcheon Azure on a chevron Argent between three mullets of six points Or as many mascles Gules a bordure engrailed Or. Supporters On either side an angel Proper habited Azure winged Or the dexter holding in the exterior hand a Saxon crown and the sinister likewise holding a trumpet Gold. Motto Look Forward Badge In front of a portcullis chained Or a grasshopper Proper. |
