= Henry Hopkinson, 1st Baron Colyton =

British politician (1902–1996)

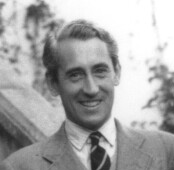
Hopkinson in Lebanon, 1942

Henry Lennox D'Aubigne Hopkinson, 1st Baron Colyton, KCVO PC (3 January 1902 – 6 January 1996), was a British diplomat and Conservative politician. He was the eldest son of Henry Lennox Hopkinson (1855-1936).

== Biography ==
Colyton was educated at Eton and Trinity College, Cambridge, and then joined the Diplomatic Service. He served in various positions at the British embassies in Washington and Stockholm and was also assistant private secretary to the Foreign Secretary, Sir John Simon, from 1932 to 1934 and First Secretary to the War Cabinet Office from 1939 to 1940. He then served as private secretary to the Permanent Under-Secretary of State for Foreign Affairs, Sir Alexander Cadogan, between 1940 and 1941 and to Oliver Lyttelton, Minister of State in the Middle East, from 1941 to 1943, being posted to Cairo. Colyton was stationed in Lisbon from 1943 to 1944 and from 1944 to 1946 he served as Deputy High Commissioner and Vice-President of the Allied Commission in Italy.

He resigned from the Diplomatic Service the latter year to work for the Conservative Party and was Head of the Conservative Parliamentary Secretariat and Joint Director of the Conservative Research Department between 1946 and 1949. The following year, in 1950, he was elected Member of Parliament for Taunton, a seat he held until 1956, and served under Winston Churchill as Secretary for Overseas Trade from 1951 to 1952 and as Minister of State for Colonial Affairs from 1952 to 1955.

On May 21 1952 during the British Malayan headhunting scandal, the Labour Party MP Michael Stewart asked Hopkinson in the House of Commons if the British government intended to punish British soldiers caught posing with decapitated human heads in images taken during the Malayan Emergency and leaked by the Daily Worker. Hopkinson confirmed that none of the British soldiers would be punished, claiming that said soldiers had never explicitly been forbidden from mutilating corpses.

Hopkinson was also a Delegate to the Consultative Assembly of the Council of Europe from 1950 to 1952 and to the General Assembly of the United Nations from 1952 to 1955. He was admitted to the Privy Council in 1952 and on 19 January 1956 he was raised to the peerage as Baron Colyton, of Farway in the County of Devon and of Taunton in the County of Somerset.

Lord Colyton married Alice Labouisse Eno, daughter of Henry Lane Eno, a banker and Princeton University professor, in 1927. They had one son and one daughter. After his first wife's death in 1953 he married, secondly, Barbara Estella Barb, who had previously been married to cartoonist Charles Addams, in 1956. Lord Colyton died in January 1996, aged 94, and was succeeded in the barony by his grandson Alisdair Hopkinson, his eldest son Hon. Nicholas Henry Eno Hopkinson having predeceased him.

== Arms ==
Coat of arms of Henry Hopkinson, 1st Baron Colyton
Crest A demi-lion Sable between two mullets of six points Or. Escutcheon Azure on a chevron Argent between three mullets of six points Or as many mascles Gules a bordure engrailed Or. Supporters On either side an angel Proper habited Azure winged Or the dexter holding in the exterior hand a Saxon crown and the sinister likewise holding a trumpet Gold. Motto Look Forward Badge In front of a portcullis chained Or a grasshopper Proper.

Parliament of the United Kingdom
Preceded by Victor Collins	Member of Parliament for Taunton; 1950 – 1956	Succeeded by Edward du Cann
Political offices
Preceded by Arthur Bottomley	Secretary for Overseas Trade; 1951–1952	Succeeded by Harry Ripley Mackeson
Preceded by Alan Lennox-Boyd	Minister of State for the Colonies; 1952–1955	Succeeded by John Hare
Peerage of the United Kingdom
New creation	Baron Colyton; 1956–1996	Succeeded by Alisdair John Munro Hopkinson
