= Doyle Salewski Inc =

- Company type: Private
- Founded: 1996
- Founder: Brian Doyle
- Headquarters: 161 Greenbank Road, Ottawa, Ontario
- Number of locations: 17 Branches
- Area served: Ontario; Quebec
- Key people: Brian Doyle (President); Paul Salewski (Senior Vice-President)
- Services: Bankruptcy; Credit Counseling; Consumer Proposal; Commercial Insolvency
- Number of employees: 45 (2021)
- Website: doylesalewski.ca

Doyle Salewski Inc. is a Licensed Insolvency Trustee firm specializing in corporate and personal insolvency and is based in Ottawa, Ontario, Canada. Personal services include credit counselling, bankruptcy and consumer proposals. Doyle Salewski Inc. also provides corporate insolvency services as a Licensed Insolvency Trustee under the Bankruptcy and Insolvency Act; monitoring under the Companies’ Creditors Arrangement Act; corporate proposals and bankruptcies; and acting as receiver or receiver and manager.

== History ==
Doyle Salewski Inc. was co-founded in 1996 by partners Brian Doyle and Paul Salewski, both of whom are chartered professional accountants, chartered insolvency and restructuring practitioners, Licensed Insolvency Trustee, and certified fraud examiners. In 2004, Doyle Salewski Inc. commissioned a study from the Centre for Research on Stress, Coping, and Well-being at Carleton University to improve the quality and style of services being delivered. The report is titled Consequences of Financial Stress for Individuals, Families, and Society

== Notable clients and cases ==
Since its inception, Doyle Salewski Inc. has taken the lead in insolvency assignments in a number of high-profile cases involving Canadian businesses and individuals.

In October 2008, Doyle Salewski Inc. was responsible for filing court documents which initiated a probe into whether certain transactions made by Zoom Airlines "were a breach of the fiduciary responsibilities of the directors." Zoom, a Canadian airline company, was alleged to have transferred $6 million to its partner and tour operator, Go Travel Direct Inc.

In July 2013, Doyle Salewski Inc. acted as the court-appointed receiver for Golden Oaks Rent 2 Own Canada after multiple lawsuits were filed against the company's owner for more than $2 million in damages.

Later in 2013, acting as trustee for four bankrupt companies and interim receiver of a charitable foundation, Doyle Salewski Inc. successfully negotiated a settlement with the son of renowned Ottawa developer Thomas G. Assaly in the alleged misappropriation of $3.7 million. The court required Assaly to turn over assets on which Doyle Salewski Inc. hoped to recover between $1.85 million and $2.8 million to be divided among investors and other creditors. (Ottawa Citizen, October 20, 2014)
