= Low-cost carrier =

Airline with generally lower fares

Jin Air Boeing 737-800 landing at Incheon International Airport

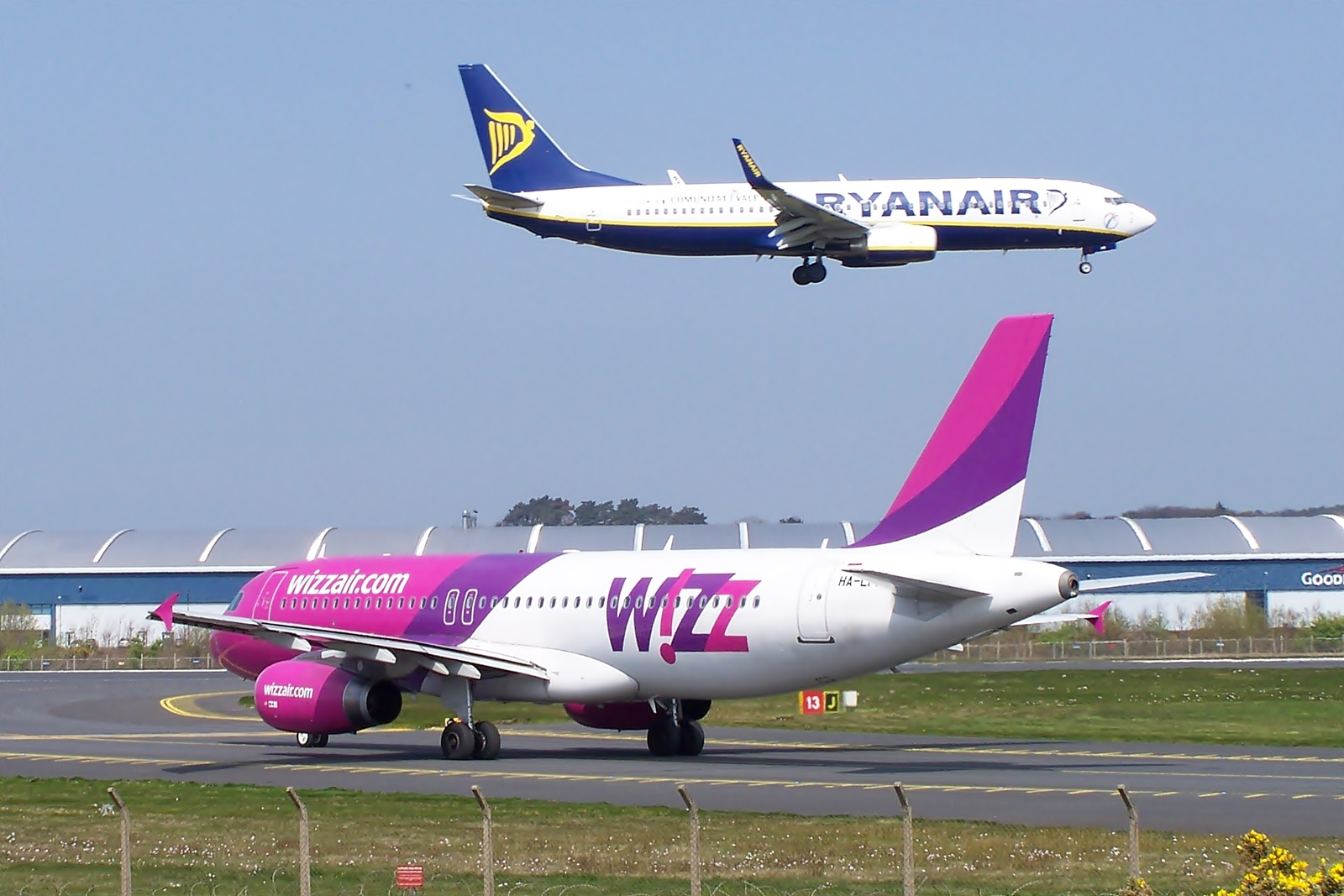
Ryanair and Wizz Air are the two major ULCCs in the European market.

A low-cost carrier (LCC) or low-cost airline, also called a budget or discount carrier or airline, is an airline that is operated with an emphasis on minimizing operating costs. It sacrifices certain traditional airline luxuries for cheaper fares. To make up for revenue lost in decreased ticket prices, the airline may charge extra fees, such as for carry-on baggage.

The term originated within the airline industry referring to airlines with a lower operating cost structure than their competitors. The term is often applied to any carrier with low ticket prices and limited services regardless of their operating models. Low-cost carriers should not be confused with regional airlines that operate short-haul flights without service, or with full-service airlines offering some reduced fares.

Some airlines advertise themselves as low-cost while maintaining products usually associated with traditional mainline carriers' services. These products include preferred or assigned seating, catering, differentiated premium cabins, satellite or ground-based Wi-Fi internet, and in-flight audio and video entertainment. The term ultra-low-cost carrier (ULCC) has been used, particularly in North America and Europe, to refer to carriers that do not provide these services and amenities.

== Business model ==
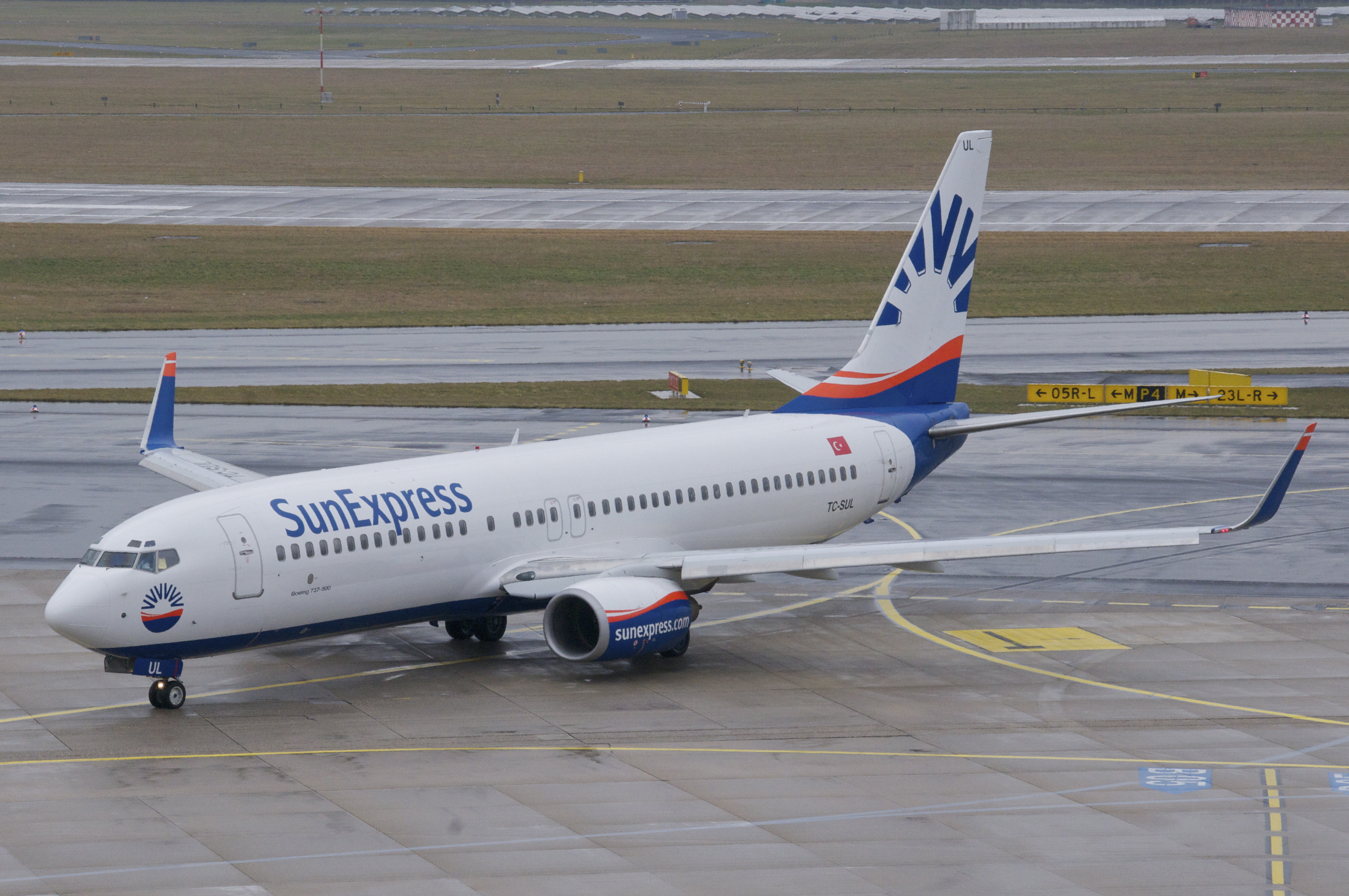
A SunExpress Boeing 737-800 at Zurich Airport

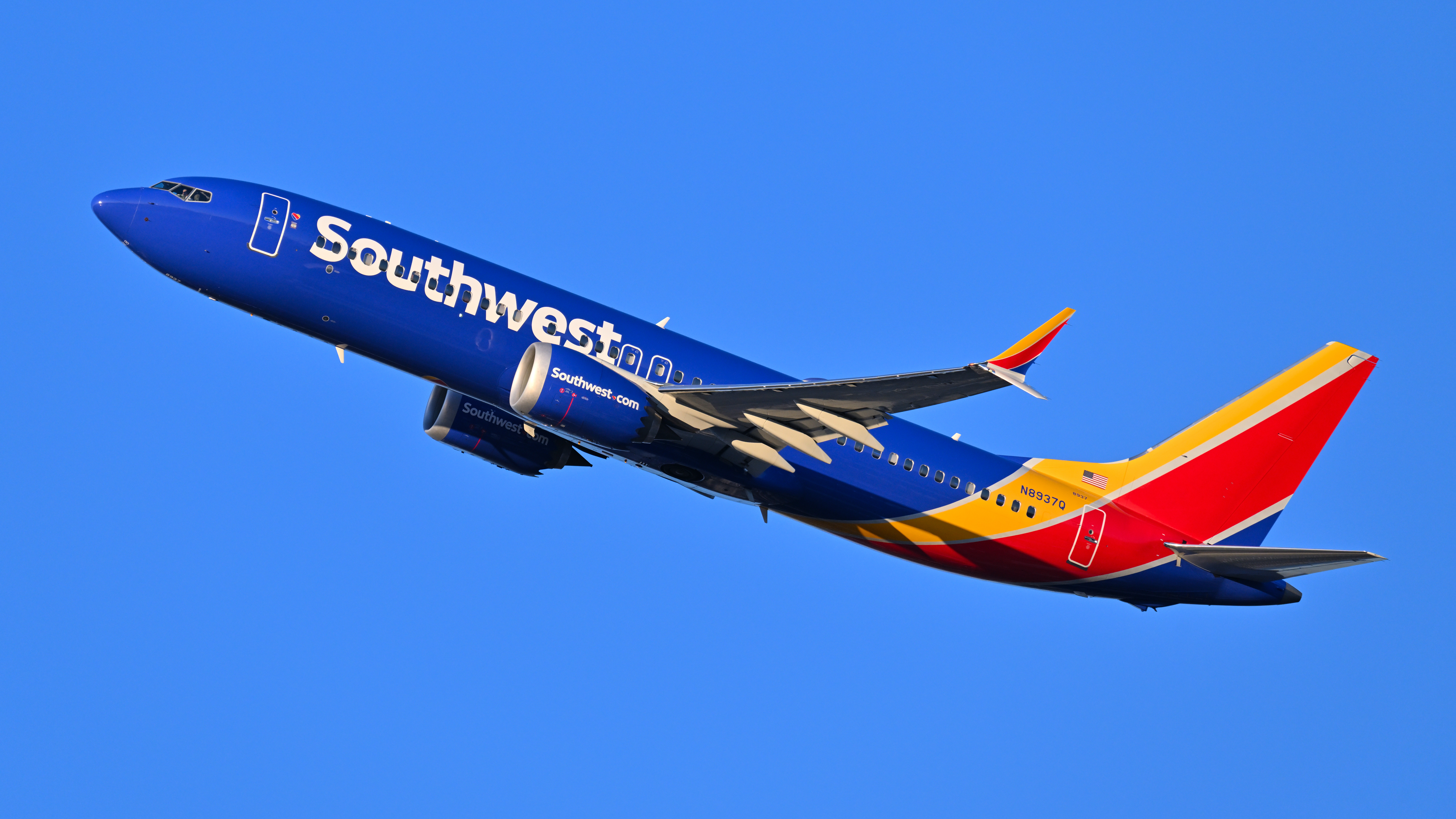
Southwest Airlines is the world's largest low-cost carrier by fleetsize and revenue

The low-cost carrier business model practices vary widely. Some practices are more common in certain regions, while others are generally universal. The common theme among all low-cost carriers is the reduction of cost and reduced overall fares compared to legacy carriers.

Traditional airlines have also reduced their cost using several of these practices.

=== Common practices ===
==== Aircraft ====
While some low-cost carriers choose to operate more than one type of aircraft and configure their aircraft with more than one passenger class, most operate aircraft configured in a single class, as well as utilizing just a single aircraft type. In this way, cabin and ground crew only have to be trained to work on one type of aircraft. This is also beneficial from a maintenance standpoint as spare parts and mechanics will only be dedicated to one type of aircraft. These airlines tend to operate short-haul flights that suit the range of narrow-body (single aisle) planes. Since the mid-2020s, there has also been a rise in demand for long-range low-cost flights and the availability of next-generation aircraft (such as the Airbus A321neoLR and A321XLR) that make long-haul routes more feasible for low-cost carriers.

In 2013, ch-aviation published a study about the fleet strategy of low-cost carriers. They stated that major LCCs that order aircraft in large numbers get large discounts for doing so, and due to this they can sell their aircraft just a few years after delivery at a price high enough to keep their operating costs relatively low.

Aircraft often operate with a minimum set of equipment, further reducing costs of acquisition and maintenance, as well as keeping the weight of the aircraft lower and thus saving fuel. Some low-cost airlines have seats that do not recline to reduce aircraft weight and lower maintenance costs, and some airlines also remove features like rear seat pockets and other cabin items to reduce operating expenses. Often, no in-flight entertainment systems are made available, though many US low-cost carriers do offer satellite television or radio in-flight. It is also becoming a popular approach to install LCD monitors onto the aircraft and broadcast advertisements on them, coupled with the traditional route–altitude–speed information. Some allow priority boarding for an extra fee instead of reserved seating, and some allow reserving a seat in an emergency exit row (for longer leg room) at an extra cost.

==== Bases ====
Like the major carriers, many low-cost carriers develop one or more bases to maximize destination coverage and defend their market. Many do not operate traditional hubs, but rather focus cities.

==== Simplicity ====
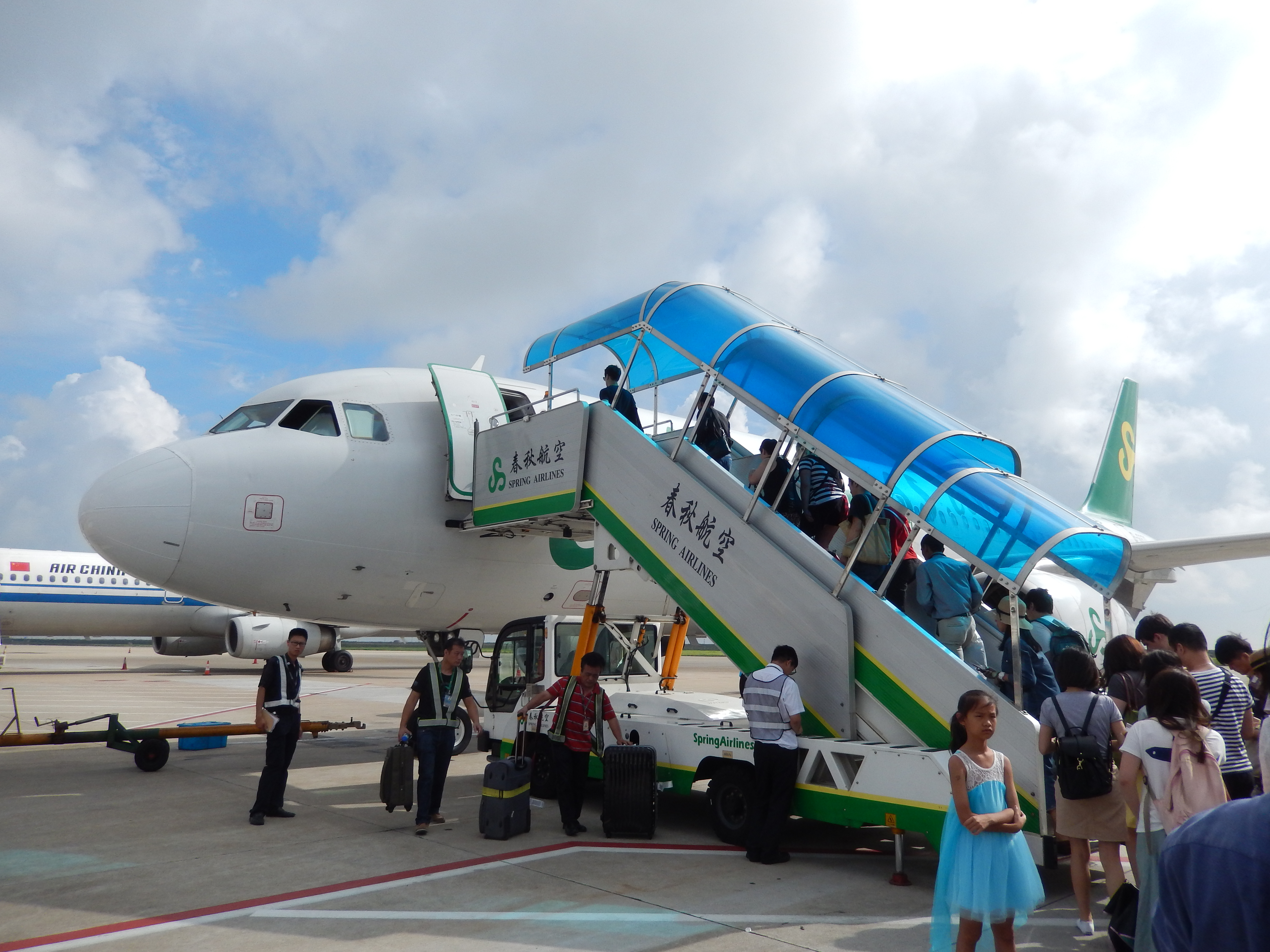
Passengers boarding a Spring Airlines Airbus A320-200 via passenger boarding stairs at Shanghai Pudong International Airport

Airlines often offer a simpler fare scheme, such as selling only one-way tickets. Typically fares increase as the plane fills up, which rewards early reservations. In Europe (and early in Southwest's history) luggage is not transferred from one flight to another, even if both flights are with the same airline. This saves costs and is thought to encourage passengers to take direct flights. Tickets are not sold with transfers, so the airline can avoid responsibility for passengers' connections in the event of a delay. Low-cost carriers often have a sparse schedule with one flight per day and route, so it would be hard to find an alternative for a missed connection. Modern US-based low-cost carriers generally transfer baggage for continuing flights, as well as transferring baggage to other airlines. Many airlines opt to have passengers board via stairs, since jetways generally cost more to lease.

Often, low-cost carriers fly to smaller, less congested secondary airports and/or fly to airports during off-peak hours to avoid air traffic delays and take advantage of lower landing fees. This is why Ryanair flies to Gatwick Airport, Luton Airport, and Stansted Airport in the London area and how easyJet can fly to Paris-Charles de Gaulle, and Amsterdam Airport Schiphol. In London's case, however, low-cost carriers would not be able to use Heathrow as the airport is running at near capacity, so there is no room to build a base. The airlines tend to offload, service and re-load the aircraft (turnaround) in shorter time periods and do not wait for late passengers, allowing maximum utilization of aircraft.

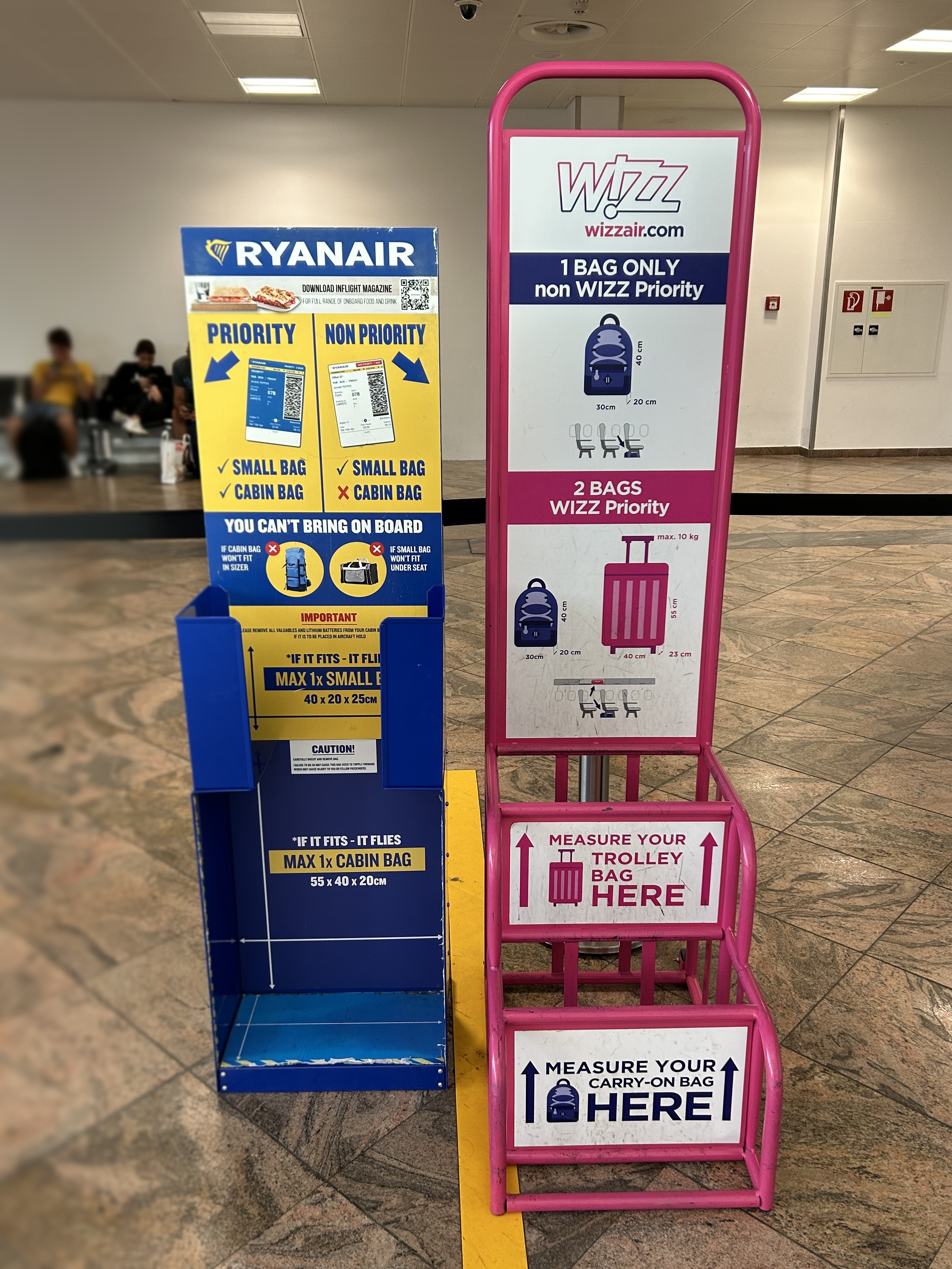
Many ULCCs and LCCs have very strict baggage policy, prompting a majority of passengers to buy extra luggage or to pay for a higher-class priority. The addition of such "extra services" potentially costs the customer more than buying a full-service ticket. Pictured here: Ryanair, Wizz Air, AirAsia, and Thai Lion Air

==== Non-flight revenue ====
Low-cost carriers generate ancillary revenue from a variety of activities, such as à la carte features and commission-based products. Some airlines may charge a fee for a pillow or blanket or for carry-on baggage. In Europe, it is common for each and every convenience and service to have an additional charge.

==== Limit personnel costs ====
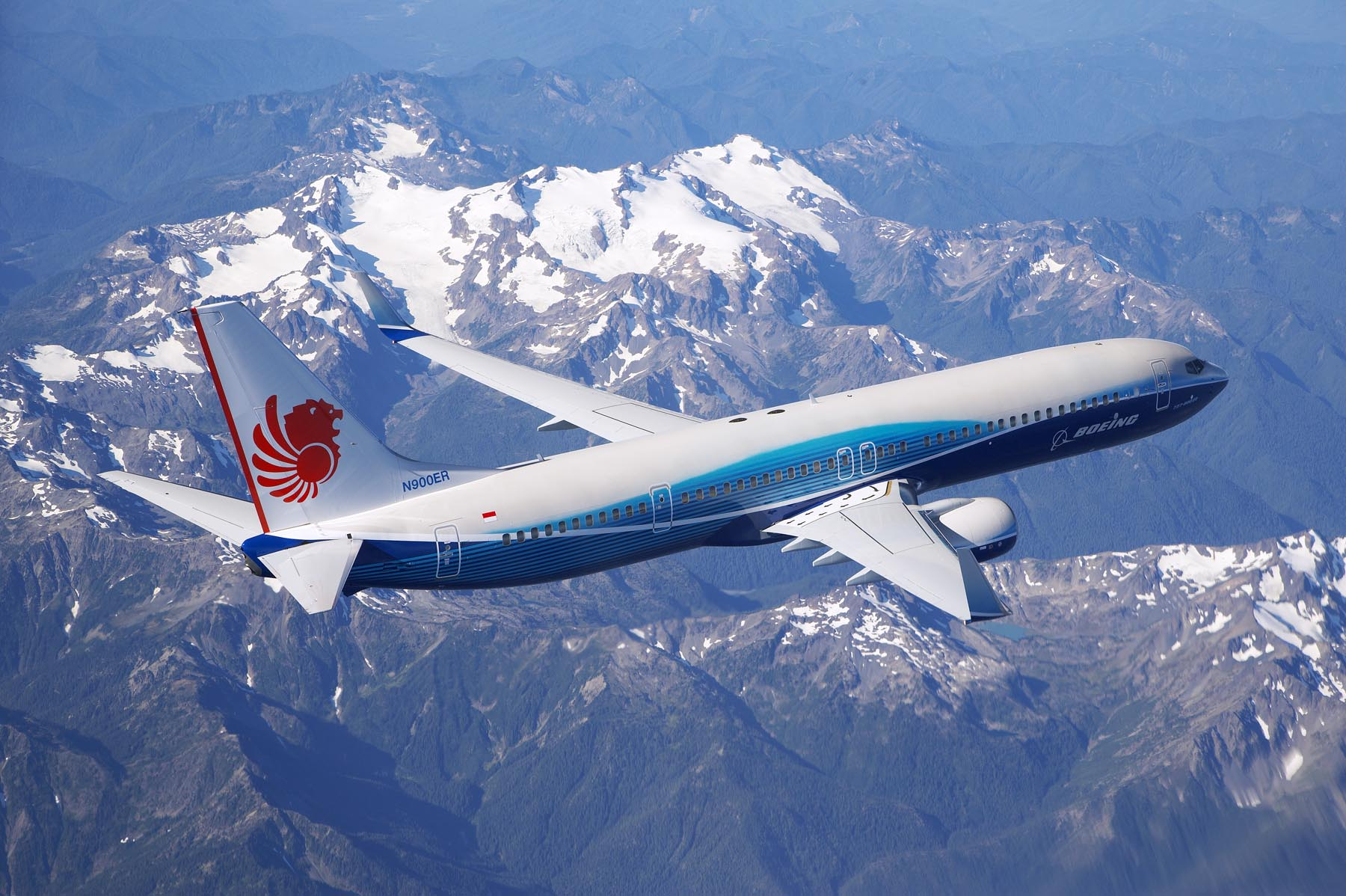
Lion Air 737-900ER in September 2006. The aircraft has Boeing's livery on the fuselage and Lion Air's on the vertical stabilizer. This is one of the largest carriers and budget airlines in Southeast Asia.

To keep costs down, low-cost carriers will, in many cases, have employees work multiple roles. At some airlines, flight attendants also work as gate agents or assume other roles, thereby limiting personnel costs. Southwest Airlines is well known for using fuel hedging programs to reduce its overall fuel costs. Check-in at the gate of luggage requires fees, as it requires addition to the weight calculation and last-minute baggage handling.

Online check-in is becoming common, again in the interest of avoiding personnel costs.

Where permissible, some airlines have a disinclination to handle Special Service passengers, for instance by placing a higher age limit on unaccompanied minors than full-service carriers. Often these airlines do not offer connecting tickets, since the airline will have to pay for ground crew to transfer luggage. A customer may create a connection manually by purchasing two separate tickets, but these are considered separate contracts, and the passenger bears the risk if a delayed inbound flight causes a missed connection. On international travels, passengers have to be mindful of visa requirements if they have checked-in luggage which has to be manually retrieved during the stop(s) to be checked-in again for the next leg(s), as baggage pick-up is only available after immigration clearance/passport control.

After deregulation, which led to lower fares, many airlines remained bound to these salary agreements and pensions, whereas new low-cost carriers employed new staff with lower salaries, especially for cabin crew, keeping personnel costs low and allowing for competitive fares. In some cases airlines have gone bankrupt (e.g., Alitalia, Sabena, and Swissair), and new airlines replaced them.

Traditional carriers followed the low-cost carriers by enabling web check-in, encouraging machine check-in at the airport, and generally reducing ground personnel cost.

The number of crew members follow international conventions that require one flight attendant per 50 passenger seats and two pilots. However, carriers can save money by reducing the amount of ground crew.

Carriers hire pilots through third-party agencies based in low-tax countries without benefits for sick pay, pensions or health insurance. Traditional carriers have also started to try this, including starting their own low-tax agencies. These agencies can easily find less experienced co-pilots and cabin crew, as the profession is popular, but there are problems for low-cost carriers to recruit and keep captains who have to be experienced.

==== Principles of operation ====
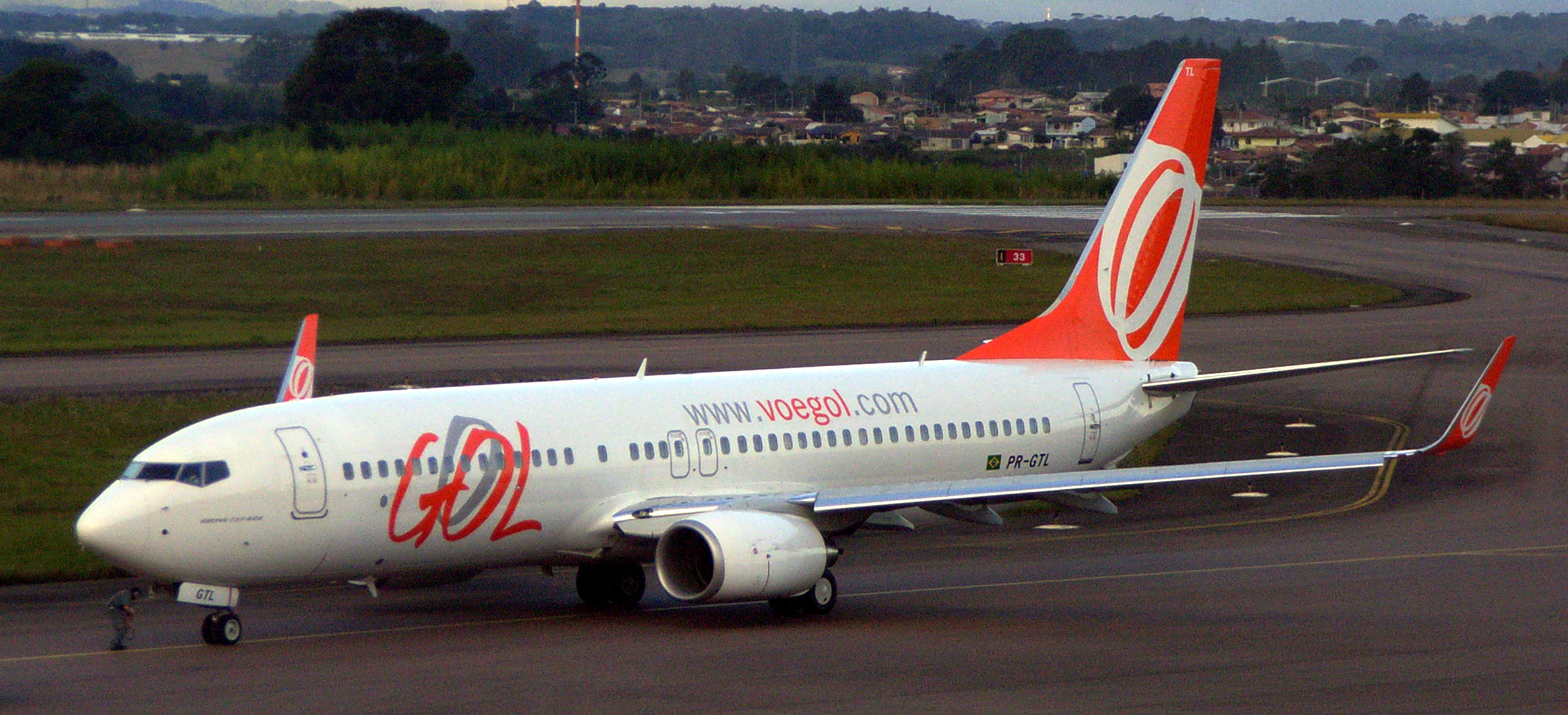
A Gol Linhas Aéreas Inteligentes Boeing 737-800 at Afonso Pena International Airport

At IATA, a LCC operation is defined as including the following characteristics, at least to some degree:

- Primarily point-to-point operations
- Short-haul routes, often between regional or secondary airports
- Strong focus on price-sensitive traffic, mostly leisure passengers
- Typically a single service class, with no (or limited) customer loyalty programmes
- Limited passenger services, with additional charges for some services (e.g., on-board catering)
- Low average fares, with a strong focus on price competition
- Different fares offered, related to aircraft load factors and length of time before departure
- A very high proportion of bookings made through the Internet
- High aircraft utilisation rates, with short turnaround between operations
- A fleet of just one or two aircraft types
- Private-sector companies
- A simple management and overhead structure with a lean strategic decision-making process

While low-cost airlines differ in service offerings, by definition they feature most of the following:

- Standardized fleet (which lowers the cost of training and maintenance)
- Absent non-essential features (reclining seats, frequent flyer programs)
- Use of secondary airports for lower landing fees and marketing support
- Avoidance of airports with high costs
- Rapid turnaround (less time on the ground, more flights per day)
- Fly at less desirable times (red-eye flights) of the day, which price sensitive tourists accept
- Online ticket sales to avoid the cost of call centres or agents
- Online check-in (fewer check-in desks), charge for desk check-in
- Baggage charges for checked bags to offset baggage handling and loading costs
- Use staff for multiple jobs (for example, check-in desk agents loading bags or cabin crew checking tickets at the gate)
- Hedge fuel costs (buying fuel in advance when cheaper)
- Charge for all services (including on-board services, reserved seating, and extra baggage)
- Do not use reserved seating (which slows down boarding), or charge extra for reserved seating or early boarding.
- Fly point-to-point (passenger transfers to other flights are not accommodated, no compensation for missed connections)
- Carry little extra fuel (reducing aircraft weight)
- Outfit plane with fuel-saving modifications, such as winglets
- Route planning before aircraft arrives at airport (saving time on the ground)
- Market destination services such as hotels and rental cars for commissions
- Cabin panels decorated with advertisements

=== Differentiation ===
Not every low-cost carrier implements all of the above points. For example, some try to differentiate themselves with allocated seating, while others operate more than one aircraft type, still others have relatively high operating costs but lower fares. JetBlue, for instance, has in-flight entertainment in every passenger seat. Other airlines are limited on what points they can implement based on local laws. For example, Irish low cost airlines cannot remove window blinds from its aircraft, as they are required by the Irish Aviation Authority. As supply increases, this sort of differentiation by brand is an important criteria for the future success of low-cost carriers, since many experts believe price competition alone is not enough, given the number of carriers.

As the number of low-cost carriers has grown, these airlines have begun to compete with one another in addition to the traditional carriers. In the US, airlines have responded by introducing variations to the model. In Europe, the emphasis has remained on reducing costs and no-frills service.

=== Ultra-low-cost carrier ===
A secondary term ultra-low-cost carrier (ULCC) has been used to differentiate some low-cost airlines whose model deviates further from that of a standard low-cost carrier, with ultra-low-cost carriers having minimal inclusions in the fare and a greater number of add-on fees.

In the US market, Allegiant Air, Avelo Airlines, Frontier Airlines, and Sun Country Airlines are considered to be ULCCs. On May 2, 2026, Spirit Airlines, the largest ULCC in America at the time, shut down amid rising fuel costs as a result of the 2026 Iran war after negotiations with the United States government for a potential bailout deal failed.

In Europe, Ryanair and Wizz Air are the most prominent ULCCs.

In Asia, AirAsia is the most prominent ULCC.

=== Pricing policy ===
The pricing policy of the low-cost carriers is usually very dynamic as befits their business model, with frequent discounts and tickets in promotion. Like other carriers, however, even if the advertised base prices are very low, charges and taxes are typically not mentioned. With some airlines, some flights are advertised as free (plus applicable taxes, fees and charges). Depending on the airline, perhaps as many (or as few) as ten percent of the seats on any flight are offered at the lowest price and are the first to sell. The prices steadily rise thereafter to a point where they can be comparable or more expensive than a flight on a full-service carrier.

Most airlines charge additional taxes and fees on their tickets. Some low-cost airlines have been known to charge fees for the seemingly ridiculous, such as levying a credit card charge if credit card is the only payment method accepted.

== History ==
The world's first low-cost airline was Pacific Southwest Airlines, which started intrastate flights connecting Southern and Northern California on 6 May 1949. PSA's light-hearted atmosphere and efficient operations were a runaway success early on, and inspired a number of low-cost start-ups across the United States, beginning in the mid-1960s. Herb Kelleher studied the success of PSA, and copied their culture closely when he established Southwest Airlines in 1971.

The first airline to offer cheaper transatlantic fares was Icelandic airline Loftleiðir in 1964, often referred to as "the Hippie Airline". Many young Americans travelled to Europe after graduation, to experience the "old-world culture", and they were more concerned with getting there cheaply than comfortably or even exactly on time. Loftleiðir was not famous for speed or punctuality, but flying with the company became a sort of rite of passage for those young "hippies", one of whom was Bill Clinton, later US president.

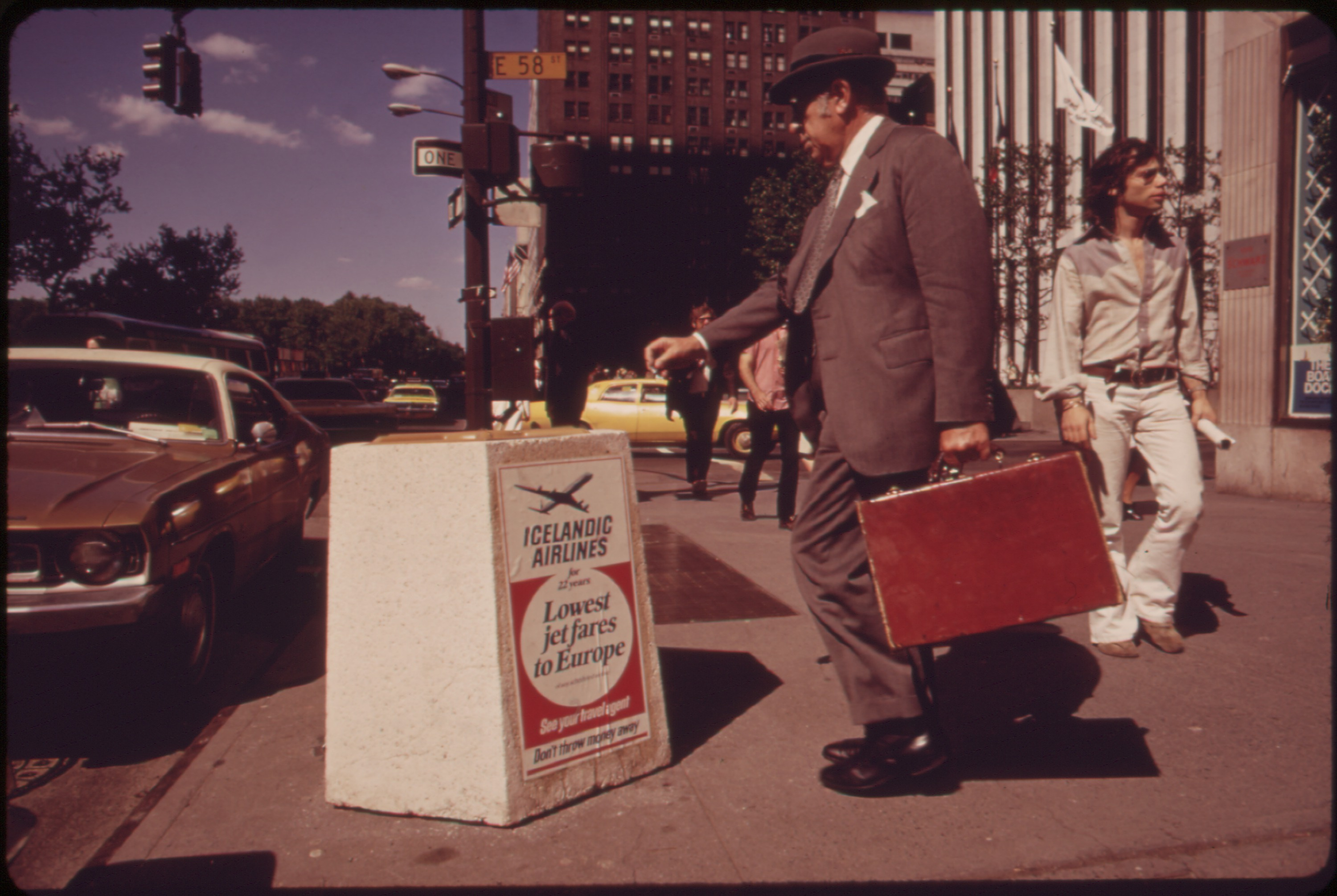
Advert for Loftleiðir Icelandic Airlines on Fifth Avenue, New York in 1973

The first airline offering no-frills transatlantic service was Freddie Laker's Laker Airways, which operated its famous "Skytrain" service between London and New York City during the late 1970s. The service was suspended after Laker's competitors, British Airways and Pan Am, were able to price Skytrain out of the market.

In the U.S., airline carriers such as Midway Airlines and America West Airlines, which commenced operations after 1978, soon realized a cost of available seat mile (CASM) advantage in relation to the traditional and established, legacy airlines such as Trans World Airlines and American Airlines. Often this CASM advantage has been attributed solely to the lower labor costs of the newly hired and lower pay grade workers of new start-up carriers, such as ValuJet, Midway Airlines, and their like. However, these lower costs can also be attributed to the less complex aircraft fleets and route networks with which these new carriers began operations, in addition to their reduced labor costs.

Noteworthy starts-ups that managed to get off the ground by using the larger aircraft services of established charter airlines were the virtual airlines; Direct Air, PeoplExpress, Western, and those that never began service such as JetAmerica.

In Japan, low-cost airlines made major inroads into the market in 2012 when Peach, Jetstar Japan and AirAsia Japan began operations, each with financial sponsorship by a domestic legacy airline and one or more foreign investors. By mid-2013, these new LCCs were operating at a unit cost of around 8 yen per seat-kilometer, compared to 10–11 yen per seat-kilometer for domestic legacy airlines. However, their unit cost was still much higher than the 3 yen per seat-kilometer for AirAsia in Malaysia, due to the higher cost of landing fees and personnel in Japan.

In 2010s and 2020s, the low-cost airline sector, once a relatively minor segment of the aviation industry, has expanded significantly and is projected to continue growing. The market is expected to increase from an estimated value of US$221.3 billion to US$430.5 billion by 2033.

=== Market share ===
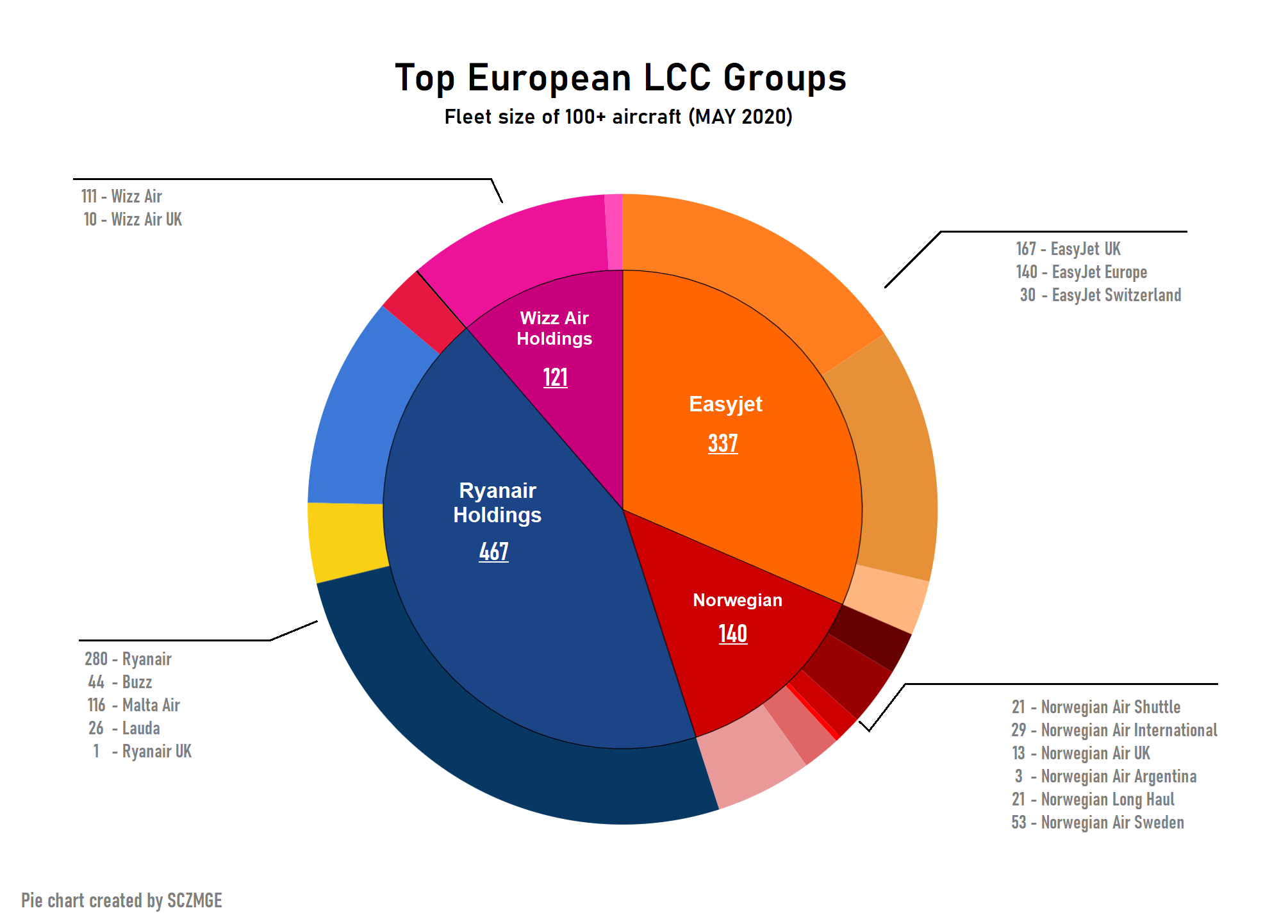
Top European low-cost carrier holding companies and their current fleet size

By 2017, low-cost carriers had achieved market share of 57.2% in South Asia and 52.6% in Southeast Asia. Market share remained somewhat lower in Europe at 37.9% and North America at 32.7%.

For the European Commission, the LCCs market share (44.8%) exceeded legacy carriers (42.4%) in 2012: between 2002 and 2017, LCC share of international seat capacity rose from 23% to 57% in the UK, from 10% to 55% in Italy and from 9% to 56% in Spain but have still room for growth in domestic seat-capacity In France with 19% and in Germany with 25% in 2017, compared with 66% in the UK, 48% in Spain and 47% in Italy.

By early 2019, there were more than 100 LCCs operating 6,000 aircraft, doubled from 2,900 aircraft at the end of 2009, while seat capacity reached nearly 1.7 billion in 2018. LCCs accounted for 33% of intra-regional seat capacity in 2018 with 1.564 billion, up from 25% in 2008 with 753 million, and 13% of seat capacity between regions with 101 million, up from 6% in 2009 with 26 million. In 2018, penetration rate was 41% of seats within Europe, 36% within Latin America, 32% within North America, 29% within Asia Pacific, 17% within the Middle East and 12% within Africa.

=== Long-haul low-cost ===
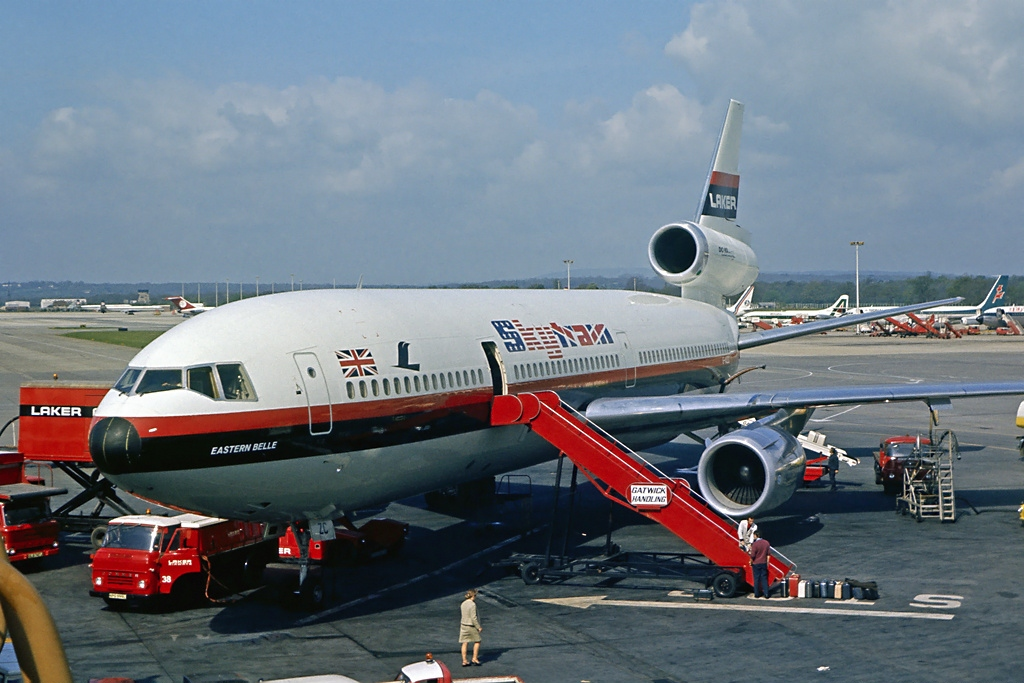
A Laker Airways Skytrain DC-10, nicknamed Eastern Belle, in London, 1973

A long-haul low-cost operation would be harder to differentiate from a conventional airline as there are few cost savings possibilities, while the seat costs would have to be lower than the competition. Long-haul aircraft scheduling is often determined by time zone constraints, like leaving the US East Coast in the evening and arriving in Europe the following morning, and the longer flight times mean there is less scope to increase aircraft utilization as in short-haul. The business model is financially risky, and many companies have entered bankruptcy, like Laker Airways.

==== History ====
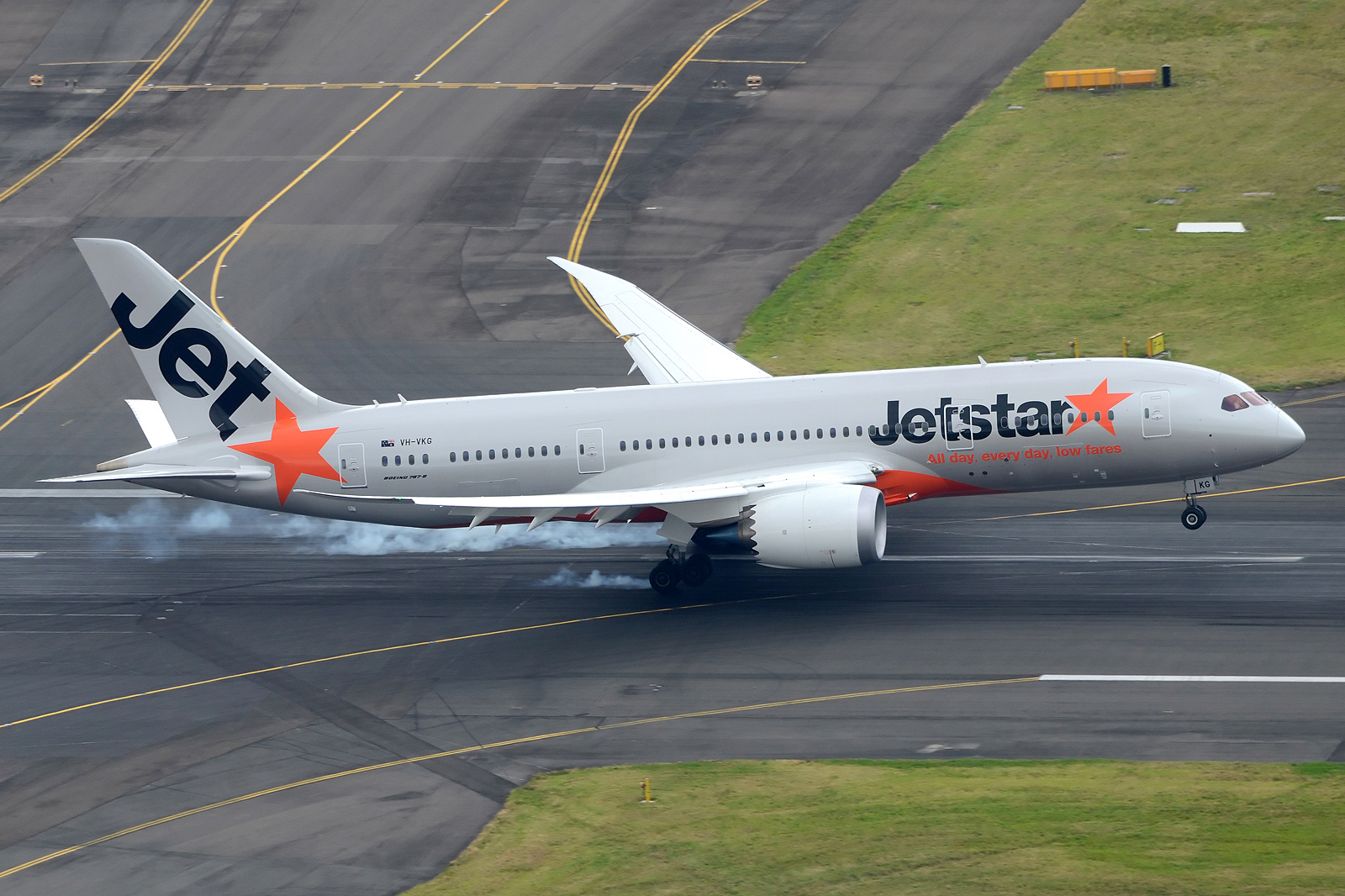
Jetstar is one of the leading long-haul low-cost carriers, operating international medium-to-long-haul flights with widebody aircraft. They also operate regional services with Airbus A320 aircraft.

In 2004, Irish Aer Lingus maintained a full service on transatlantic flights while it lowered its prices to compete with Ryanair on short haul. Late in 2004, Oasis Hong Kong Airlines offered London to Hong Kong flights from £199, and Canadian Zoom Airlines started selling transatlantic flights between the United Kingdom and Canada for £89. In August 2006, Zoom announced a UK subsidiary to offer low-cost long-haul flights to the United States and India, but suspended its operations from 28 August 2008 due to high fuel prices inducing financial problems.

In 2005, Emirates' Tim Clark viewed long-haul low-cost as inevitable, flights could be operated on 760 seats all-economy Airbus A380s, or 870 for an hypothetical A380 stretch. Since 2005, Australia's Jetstar operates international flights, starting with Christchurch, New Zealand. In late 2006, others followed from Sydney, Melbourne and Brisbane, to popular tourist destinations within 10 hours like Honolulu, Japan, Vietnam, Thailand and Malaysia. With new aircraft deliveries, it hopes to fly to the continental US and Europe.

In April 2006, the industry magazine Airline Business analysed the potential for low-cost long-haul service and concluded that a number of Asian carriers, including AirAsia, were closest to making such a model work. On 26 October 2006, Oasis Hong Kong Airlines started flying from Hong Kong Airport to London-Gatwick. The lowest prices for flights between Hong Kong to London could be as low at £75 (approximately US$150) per leg (not including taxes and other charges) for economy class and £470 (approximately US$940) per leg for business class for the same route. From 28 June 2007, a second long-haul route to Vancouver, British Columbia, was started. The company ceased operations on 9 April 2008, after over a billion Hong Kong dollars in losses.

On 2 November 2007, AirAsia X, a subsidiary of AirAsia and Virgin Group flew its inaugural flight from Kuala Lumpur, Malaysia, to Gold Coast, Australia. AirAsia X claims that it is the first true low-cost long-haul carrier since the end of Skytrain. In late 2007, Cebu Pacific, the Philippines' largest low-cost carrier, announced non-stop flights from the Philippines to the United States West Coast and other US cities from mid-2009. The airline also intends to launch low-cost service to Middle East, where around a million Filipinos are based, and in Europe. Flights to Dubai — its first long-haul destination — started in 2013. As of September 2024, it operates flights to Dubai daily, to Sydney four times a week, and Melbourne thrice weekly.

On 11 March 2009, AirAsia X started its first low-cost long-haul service into Europe, to London Stansted. The daily flights were operated by two leased Airbus A340-300s. A one-way economy-class ticket often cost £150, and the premium-class one-way often cost £350. On 12 January 2012, AirAsia announced that it would be suspending services to Europe on 1 April 2012.

Low-cost European airline, Norwegian Air Shuttle, started long-haul low-cost operations in May 2013 under their Norwegian Long Haul arm. Norwegian initially operated flights to Bangkok and New York from Scandinavia using leased Airbus A340 aircraft, switching to new Boeing 787s in the second half of 2013 after Boeing resumed deliveries following extensive problems and delays. It served direct routes from the United States (Los Angeles, Fort Lauderdale, New York City, Oakland-San Francisco, Boston and Orlando) to Scandinavia (Oslo, Stockholm, Copenhagen). In January 2021 Norwegian announced the immediate cessation of their long-haul operations, along with a large-scale reduction of its fleet of Boeing 737 aircraft and operations.

In March 2017, International Airlines Group established Level, a long-haul low-cost virtual airline based in Barcelona Airport and serving destinations in North and South America. Long-haul low-cost carriers are emerging on the transatlantic flights market with 545,000 seats offered over 60 city pairs in September 2017 (a 66% growth over one year), compared to 652,000 seats over 96 pairs for Leisure airlines and 8,798,000 seats over 357 pairs for mainline carriers.

Former American Airlines CEO Bob Crandall thinks the legacy carriers will force Long-haul LCCS to lose too much money and will continue to dominate. While Asian carriers like AirAsia X, Scoot, Cebu Pacific and Jetstar Airways are successful, the October 2018 demise of Primera Air and its $99 transatlantic flights illustrates the difficulties of the model, as the US World Airways will be relaunched in 2019.

Norse Atlantic Airways was founded in 2021 and commenced operations in 2022, operating transatlantic flights as well as flights to Thailand beginning in 2023.

In June 2024, HiSky started long haul operations between Bucharest-Otopeni to New York JFK.

=== Low-cost business-only carriers ===
A trend from the mid-2000s was the formation of new low-cost carriers exclusively targeting the long-haul business market. Aircraft are generally configured for a single class of service, initially on transatlantic routings.

Similarly, Midwest Express (later Midwest Airlines) which operated from 1984 until it was absorbed into Frontier Airlines in 2010, and Legend Airlines which ceased operations in late 2000 were also founded on this operating model.

Probably best described as "fewer frills" rather than "no frills", the initial entrants in this market utilized second-hand, mid-sized, twin jets, such as Boeing 757 and Boeing 767, in an attempt to service the lucrative London-US Eastern Seaboard market:

- La Compagnie
- Eos Airlines, which ceased operating on 27 April 2008
- MAXjet, which ceased its scheduled business flights in December 2007 and was unable to transition to charter as planned.
- Silverjet, which ceased operations on 30 May 2008.

== Criticism ==
Some elements of the low-cost model have been subject to criticism by governments and regulators; and in the UK in particular, the issue of "unbundling" of ancillary charges by both low-cost carriers and other airlines (showing airport fees or taxes as separate charges rather than as part of the advertised fare) to make the "headline fare" appear lower has resulted in enforcement action. Considering that this amounts to a misleading approach to pricing, the United Kingdom's Office of Fair Trading (OFT) in February 2007 gave all carriers and travel companies three months to include all fixed non-optional costs in their basic advertised prices. Although the full-service carriers had complied within the specified timescales, the low-cost carriers have been less compliant in this respect, leading to the prospect of legal action by the OFT.

Some destination cities lie relatively far from the airports that low-cost airlines use to save costs. Examples of this are Hahn, Weeze and Girona airports—which low-cost airlines advertise as the destinations for Frankfurt, Düsseldorf, and Barcelona, respectively—even though these airports are 50 to 90 kilometres away. This has drawn criticism, mostly from competing airlines that fly closer to the destinations.

IAG CEO Willie Walsh found established airlines arrogant facing the LCC model. For instance, Aer Lingus turned down the opportunity to buy Ryanair for £29 million Irish pounds (€36.8 million). The company further stated that it would not have developed Ryanair and instead would have shut it down.

== See also ==
- Low cost carrier terminal
- List of low-cost airlines
