= E-Clear =

British payment processing company

- Type: Private Limited Company
- Industry: Finance, digital payment
- Founded: 2002
- Defunct: 2010
- Headquarters: Mayfair, City of Westminster, United Kingdom
- Services: Payment processing

E-Clear was a British payment processor that provided merchant accounts for companies, allowing them to accept credit cards. E-Clear specialized in the travel industry in the United Kingdom.

Members of the company's board included Elias Elia, Derek Tullett and Sir Edward du Cann.

Formed in 2002 and based in Mayfair, City of Westminster, the company was based in Britain, but owned by a parent company registered in Cyprus, and its chief executive Elias Elia is a Greek Cypriot.

== History ==
In 2007, Deutsche Bank announced the end of its agreement for card processing with E-Clear. As a result, E-Clear began buying shares in NordFinanz, a small loss-making bank in Bremen. By 2009, E-Clear owned 97% of the shares in the bank. In 2010, it sold the stake.

In January 2010, the company was put into administration. Once the company went under, insolvency experts from the accounting firm BDO took control of E-Clear to audit its book.
