= Edward du Cann =

British politician and businessman (1924-2017)

The Right Honourable Sir Edward du Cann KBE
- Du Cann in 1963

Chairman of the 1922 Committee
- In office 1972–1984
- Leader: Edward Heath; Margaret Thatcher
- Preceded by: Harry Legge-Bourke
- Succeeded by: Cranley Onslow

Chairman of the Conservative Party
- In office 21 January 1965 – 11 September 1967
- Leader: Alec Douglas-Home; Edward Heath
- Preceded by: The Viscount Blakenham
- Succeeded by: Anthony Barber

Member of Parliament for Taunton
- In office 14 February 1956 – 18 May 1987
- Preceded by: Henry Hopkinson
- Succeeded by: David Nicholson

Personal details
- Born: Edward Dillon Lott du Cann; 28 May 1924 Beckenham, England
- Died: 31 August 2017 (aged 93) Cyprus
- Party: Conservative
- Spouses: Sallie Innes (m. 1962; div. 1990) Jennifer Cooke (m. 1990; died 1995): Maureen Hope-Wynne
- Children: 3 (by Innes)
- Education: St John's College, Oxford
- Profession: Business

Military service
- Allegiance: United Kingdom
- Branch/service: Royal Navy
- Rank: Lieutenant
- Battles/wars: Second World War

Sir Edward Dillon Lott du Cann KBE (28 May 1924 – 31 August 2017) was a British politician and businessman. He was a member of Parliament (MP) from 1956 to 1987 and served as Chairman of the Conservative Party from 1965 to 1967 and as chairman of the party's 1922 Committee from 1972 to 1984.

== Early life ==
Du Cann was born in Beckenham in 1924, the son of barrister and writer Charles du Cann, and Martha Janet (née Murchie) du Cann. He was educated at Colet Court, Woodbridge School and St John's College, Oxford, where he was a friend of Kingsley Amis. During the Second World War, he was commissioned as an officer in the Royal Navy. Serving as a lieutenant in motor torpedo boats based in East Anglia patrolling the North Sea, he served alongside both Owen Aisher (later a yachtsman and entrepreneur) and David Wickins (the founder of British Car Auctions and an entrepreneur). At the end of the war, he became a company director.

== Political career ==
In 1951, du Cann contested Walthamstow West and, in 1955, Barrow-in-Furness, on both occasions without success. He was elected as MP for Taunton in a 1956 by-election. Du Cann served as the Economic Secretary to the Treasury from 1962 and as a Minister of State at the Board of Trade 1963–64. He was then the chairman of the Conservative Party from 1965 to 1967, and chairman of the 1922 Committee from 1972 to 1984. He was sworn of the Privy Council in 1964.

In 1974, du Cann played a part in the events surrounding the elevation of Margaret Thatcher to the leadership of the Conservative Party. Following two narrow defeats for the Conservatives at the polls, in the February and October general elections, significant disquiet in the party had developed over the leadership of Edward Heath, who had lost three elections as leader. On 14 October, the executive of the 1922 Committee met at du Cann's home, amidst a good deal of press attention.

That was soon followed by a more public meeting of the executive at du Cann's offices at Keyser Ullman, on Milk Street, where it was decided that the committee would press Heath to hold a leadership election. The location of this meeting led to Fleet Street nicknaming the attendees the "Milk Street Mafia". As Alec Douglas-Home, at Heath's request, considered the procedures for a leadership election, there was some speculation that du Cann would himself stand as a representative of the party's right wing against Heath.

By the time Douglas-Home reported in December 1974, however, events had intervened. The devastating collapse of the banking boom had swept up du Cann's firm, Keyser Ullman, in its path. He was criticized as "incompetent" by a 1974 Department of Trade and Industry report regarding the bankrupt Keyser Ullman bank, of which he was a director. Du Cann did not put himself forward as a candidate in the leadership contest. This released key support for Margaret Thatcher, especially as another potential right-wing candidate, Keith Joseph, withdrew from any leadership attempt following a series of controversial speeches on social policy. Consequently, after defeating Heath in the first round, Thatcher emerged triumphant in the second round in early 1975, defeating a number of other candidates who would play significant roles in her subsequent premiership.

In the last week of the 1975 referendum on British membership of the European Economic Community, du Cann came out against British membership. He was chairman of the Public Accounts Committee from 1974 to 1979.

== Post-political retirement ==
Du Cann retired from the House of Commons in 1987, selling his home Cothay Manor in 1993 and returning to live in London. He was instrumental in creating a scholarship programme for rugby league players at the University of Oxford.

Du Cann succeeded Duncan Sandys as chairman of Lonrho, a position from which he was forced to resign due to his role as deputy chairman of Homes Assured, a finance company which crashed. His resignation came two days before the company collapsed, owing £10 million to creditors. Du Cann was involved in several legal disputes over debts; his Somerset estate was repossessed in 1992 and his London flat was repossessed in 1993. He later had a bankruptcy order served against him.

He was a board member of E-Clear, a British payment processing company, which went into administration in January 2010.

== Personal life ==
He married three times; first, in 1962, to Sallie (a cousin), whom he divorced in 1987, then to Jennifer (the widow of Robert Cooke, former MP for Bristol West), whom he married in 1990 and was with until her death in 1995. He was declared bankrupt in 1993 and lived for several years in Alderney. As of 2013 he was a resident of Lemona in Cyprus. He died from cancer in Cyprus on 31 August 2017 and is survived by his third wife, Maureen Hope-Wynne.

Parliament of the United Kingdom
Preceded by Henry Hopkinson	Member of Parliament for Taunton; 1956–1987	Succeeded by David Nicholson
Political offices
Preceded by Lord Blakenham	Chairman of the Conservative Party; 1965–1967	Succeeded by Anthony Barber
Preceded by Sir Harry Legge-Bourke	Chairman of the 1922 Committee; 1972–1984	Succeeded by Cranley Onslow
