= Elias Elia (businessman) =

Cypriot businessman

Elias Elia is a Greek Cypriot businessman whose profile made headlines after multiple airlines across Europe collapsed. He was the owner of E-Clear, a $ billion company that handled payments mostly for the travel industry.

== Background ==
Elias was successful in the travel payment industry. In an interview he said, "We're here today to expand on the collaborations with airlines".

He tried to prop up another company after buying E-Clear back from its administrators. A report claimed that Elia bought a brand-new £135,000 Ferrari in the spring of 2008 and a £155,000 Rolls-Royce Phantom, in May of the same year.

== Other Companies ==
Links were found from Elias to Elian properties and the Allbury Travel Group, both of which also went into administration soon after E-Clear's demise.
