= Zoom Airlines Limited =

British airline

Zoom Airlines
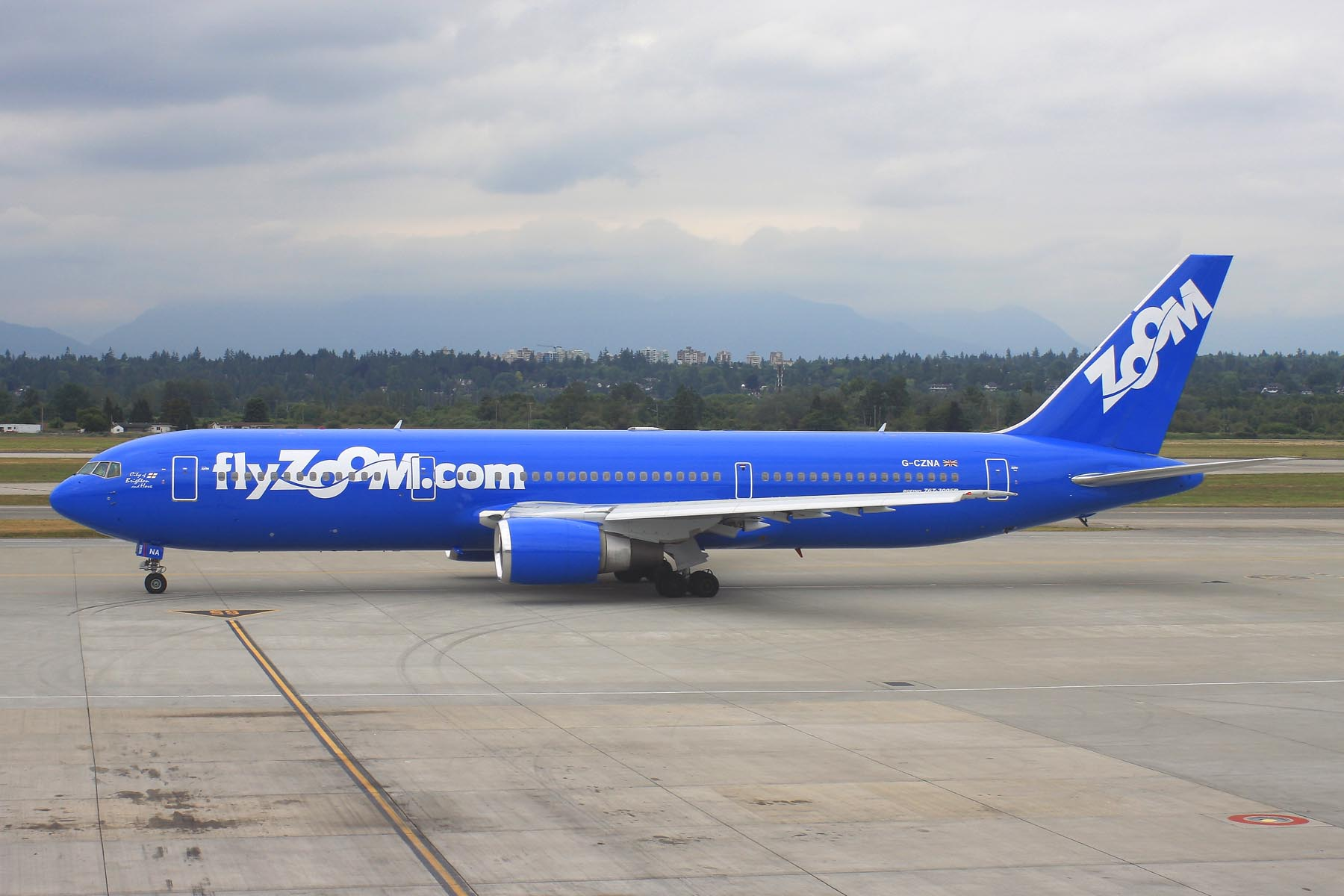
- Boeing 767-300ER
IATA	ICAO	Call sign
ZX	UKZ	FLYZOOM
- Founded: August 2006
- Commenced operations: April 2007
- Ceased operations: August 2008
- Hubs: London Gatwick Airport
- Fleet size: 3
- Destinations: 5+3
- Parent company: Zoom Airlines Inc.
- Headquarters: Crawley, West Sussex, England, United Kingdom
- Key people: John Boyle – Chairman, Jonathan Hinkles – UK Managing Director
- Website: http://www.flyzoom.com

Zoom Airlines Ltd. was a British scheduled, low-fare, transatlantic airline, a subsidiary company to Zoom Airlines Inc., from Canada. The British air carrier was based in Crawley, West Sussex, England. It held a United Kingdom Civil Aviation Authority Type A Operating Licence (Number OL/A/540), which permitted it to carry passengers, cargo, and mail on aircraft with 20 or more seats. The airline operated year-round scheduled services to the United States, United Kingdom, and Bermuda, as well as charter services to Asia, South America and the Caribbean destinations with several European tour operators. On 28 August 2008 Zoom suspended all operations and filed for bankruptcy protection due to deteriorating financial position.

== History ==
Zoom Airlines Ltd. was founded in the summer of 2006 as a low-fare transatlantic airline. The carrier, based in London, was conceived by two Scottish brothers, Hugh and John Boyle, to fill an emerging opportunity in the UK-US leisure travel market. The Bank of Scotland Growth Equity acquired a minority stake as part of a £5.7m investment package. This provided the additional funds for the start up of the UK air carrier. Flight operations were launched on 12 April 2007. Twice weekly off-peak flights to Bermuda commenced on 8 June, while early in July 2008 a third route was launched to San Diego; Fort Lauderdale was later also added to the growing network. On 28 August 2008, Zoom announced that they were ceasing operations due to rising oil prices. All aircraft would be returned to their respective lessors, and all flights were cancelled.

== Fleet ==
Zoom Airlines fleet consisted of the following aircraft (as of 10 July 2008):

Aircraft type	Total	Passengers (Premium Economy/Economy)	Remarks
Boeing 757-200	1	201 (44/167)	Operated by Air Finland
Boeing 767-300ER	2	266 (84/182); 270 (63/207)	Aircraft named City of London Aircraft named City of Brighton and Hove
