= Charles Norman (cricketer) =

English banker and cricketer

Charles Loyd Norman (10 March 1833 – 17 February 1889) was an English banker and a cricketer who played first-class cricket for Cambridge University, Kent, the Marylebone Cricket Club and other amateur teams in the 1850s. He was born at Bromley Common, Kent and died at San Remo in Italy.

== Life ==
A member of the Norman family which has been prominent in British banking and business for nearly 200 years, Charles Norman was the eldest son of George Warde Norman, a director of the Bank of England. Charles' younger brother was Frederick Norman, a leading merchant banker of Victorian times, and Frederick's son was Montagu Norman who became Governor of the Bank of England. There were family connections too in politics and public life: Ronald Collet Norman, chairman of London County Council and of the British Broadcasting Corporation, and Maurice Bonham Carter, H. H. Asquith's Principal Private Secretary, were nephews. Many of the family also played first-class cricket, including Charles Norman's father, his brothers Frederick and Philip, and Maurice Bonham Carter.

Norman was educated at Eton College and Trinity College, Cambridge. He was captain of cricket at Eton in 1850 and played as a right-handed batsman for Cambridge University in both 1852 and 1853, appearing in the University match against Oxford University in both seasons, the first as an opening batsman, the second in the middle order. By modern standards his batting figures are not impressive and he averaged only 9.09 runs per innings across 13 first-class matches; against the MCC in a match for Cambridge University at Fenner's in 1853, however, he scored 31 and 34, the two highest scores of his career.

Norman became a merchant banker and was a partner at Baring Brothers from 1853 to his death in 1889.

== Bibliography ==
- Carlaw, Derek (2020). Kent County Cricketers, A to Z: Part One (1806–1914) (PDF). Cardiff: ACS.
