= Norman family =

The Norman family became prominent in British banking circles from about 1820 to 1950. The most prominent member of the family was Sir Montagu Norman, the powerful Governor of the Bank of England from 1920 to 1944.

- George Warde Norman (1793–1882), was a director of the Bank of England from 1821 to 1872. His fourth son was :
  - Frederick Norman (1839–1916), a director of the merchant bank Brown, Shipley & Co. He married Lina Susan Collet (1852–1950), a daughter of Sir Mark Wilks Collet, 1st Baronet, of St. Clere, Ightham, Sevenoaks, on 15 November 1870. They had three children together (two sons and one daughter) :
    - Sir Montagu Norman, 1st Baron Norman (6 September 1871 – 4 February 1950), a long serving Governor of the Bank of England;
    - Ronald Collet Norman (1873–5 December 1963), chaired the BBC and the London County Council. He was the father of :
      - Mark Norman CBE (3 April 1910 – 1994) was an English banker, managing director of Lazard Brothers, the merchant bankers and chairman of Gallaher, the cigarette manufacturers. He was the father of :
        - David Norman (born 30 January 1941), a management consultant and entrepreneur.
  - Philip Norman (1842–1931), another son of George Warde Norman, was a noted artist, author and antiquarian.

The banking Normans are not descended from the Dukes of Rutland, but are related to the Bonham-Carter family.
