= Collet baronets =

Extinct baronetcy in the Baronetage of the United Kingdom

- Escutcheon of the Collet baronets of St Clere
- Creation date: 1888
- Status: extinct
- Extinction date: 1944

The Collet Baronetcy, of St Clere in the parish of Ightham in the County of Kent, was a title in the Baronetage of the United Kingdom. It was created on 12 June 1888 for Mark Collet, Governor of the Bank of England. The title became extinct on the death of his son, the second Baronet, in 1944.

== Collet baronets, of St Clere (1888) ==
- Sir Mark Wilks Collet, 1st Baronet (17 September 1816 – 25 April 1905) was an English merchant and banker. He served as Governor of the Bank of England between 1887 and 1889, and was granted a baronetcy in 1889. His grandsons by his daughter Lina Penelope Collet included Montagu Norman (Governor of the Bank of England between 1920 and 1944) and Frederick Henry Norman.
- Sir Mark Edlmann Collet (12 January 1864 – 24 September 1944)

Baronetage of the United Kingdom
Preceded by Northcote baronets	Collet baronets of St Clere; 12 June 1888	Succeeded by Tupper baronets
