= Charles Norman =

Charles Norman may refer to:

- Charles Norman (British Army officer) (1891–1974), served in World War I and World War II
- Charles Norman (cricketer) (1833–1889), English cricketer and banker

== See also ==
- Charles Normand, Scottish meteorologist
