= Alice, Lady Northcote =

The Right Honourable Alice Northcote Lady Northcote, DBE CI
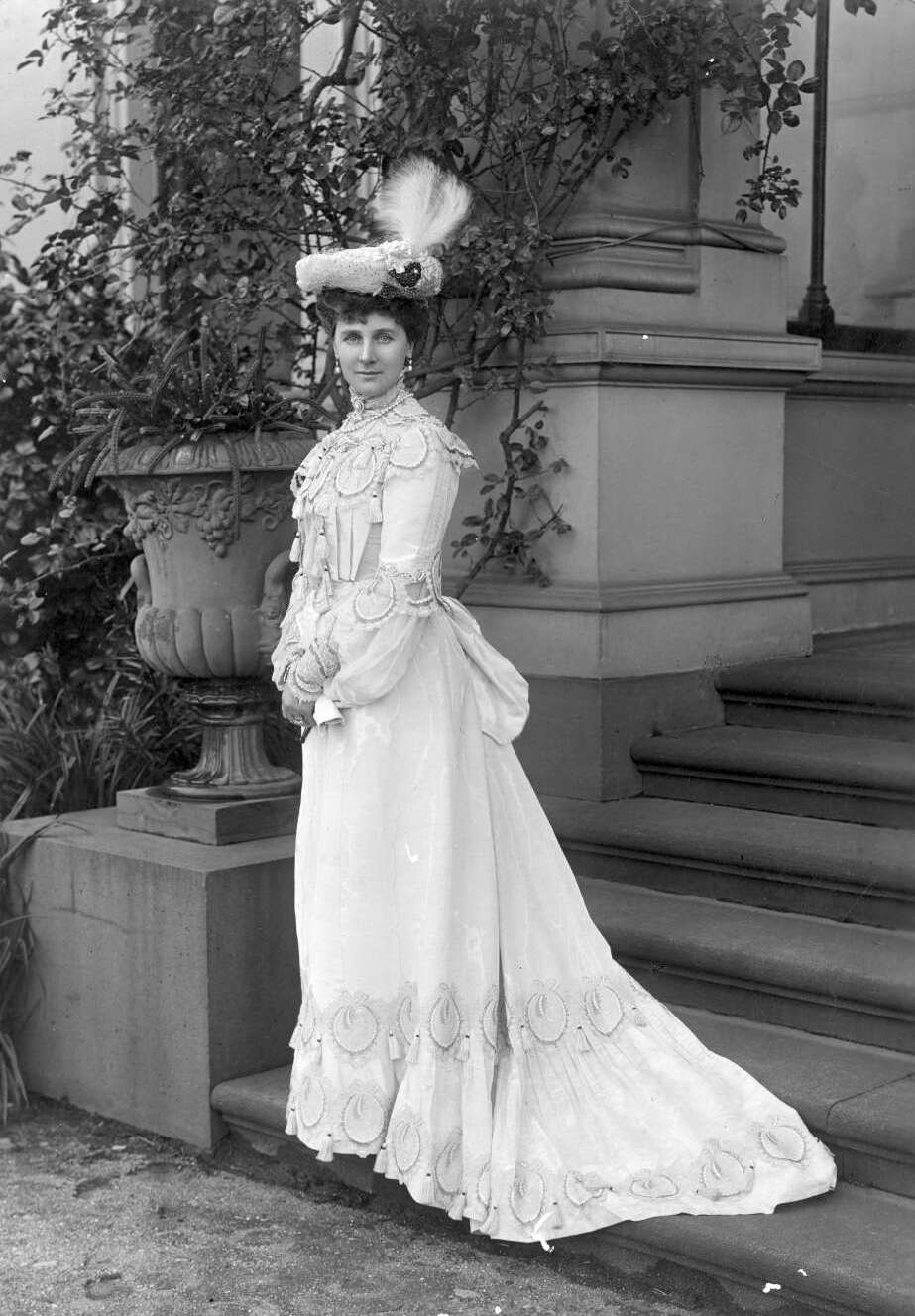
- Born: Alice Brooke
- Died: June 1, 1934
- Other name: Alice Maude Stephen
- Spouse: Henry Northcote, 1st Baron Northcote
- Honours: Dame Commander of the Order of the British Empire (1919), Imperial Order of the Crown of India (1900)

Lady Alice Northcote, DBE (died 1 June 1934) known also as Alice Maude Stephen and Alice Brooke, was a philanthropist and public figure. She was appointed to the Imperial Order of the Crown of India in 1900 after her husband took office as Governor of Bombay. She was appointed a Dame Commander of the Order of the British Empire (DBE) in the 1919 Birthday Honours.

Lady Northcote was also known for her role organising – and as president of – the Australian Exhibition of Women's Work, which took place in Melbourne in 1907. She opened the exhibition alongside Pattie Deakin, wife of the Prime Minister and with whom she formed a "collaborative friendship".

== Adoption and marriage ==
Known as Alice Maude Stephen, she was adopted in Montreal as a young woman by the Canadian railroad tycoon George Stephen, 1st Baron Mount Stephen known as the "richest man in Canada" and Annie, Lady Mount Stephen. She was purportedly the daughter of a Vermont clergyman and had been born Alice Brooke, changing her name when adopted.

In October 1873, she married the British politician Henry Northcote, 1st Baron Northcote, who she met through her adoptive parents. He later became Governor of Bombay and Governor General of Australia.

== Philanthropy ==
Northcote was the first Patron of the Melbourne Symphony Orchestra upon its founding in 1906 and established the Lady Northcote Permanent Orchestra Trust Fund to fund orchestral music in the city.

At her bequest, the Northcote Trust was established in 1936 to assist poor British children "to migrate from any part of Great Britain." This led to the construction of the Northcote Farm School, where English children were sent upon selection by trustees. After the school closed in 1975, the Trust continued providing support in the form of scholarships, such as the Lady Alice Northcote Scholarship at RMIT University, and other educational grants.
