= Lord Norman =

Lord Norman may refer to:

- Montagu Norman, 1st Baron Norman (1871–1950), British banker
- Norman Smiley, British professional wrestler, ring name Lord Henry Norman
