= William Menzies Tweedie =

Scottish portrait-painter (1826–1878)

- Born: 19 February 1826; Glasgow, Scotland
- Died: 19 March 1878 (aged 52); London, England

William Menzies Tweedie (19 February 1826– 19 March 1878) was a Scottish portrait-painter.

== Life ==
He was born in Glasgow, the son of David Tweedie, a lieutenant in the Royal Marines, and Mary Menzies. He was himself intended for the navy, but was allowed to study art. He entered the Edinburgh Academy at the age of sixteen, and remained there for four years, gaining a prize for the best copy of William Etty's picture The Combat.

In 1846 Tweedie came to London and became a student at the Royal Academy. He then studied for three years in Paris under Thomas Couture. From 1856 till 1859 he resided in Rodney Street, Liverpool. He settled in London in 1859, and resided at first in Baker Street; after 1862 he was at 44 Piccadilly.

Tweedie died on 19 March 1878 in London, England.

== Works ==
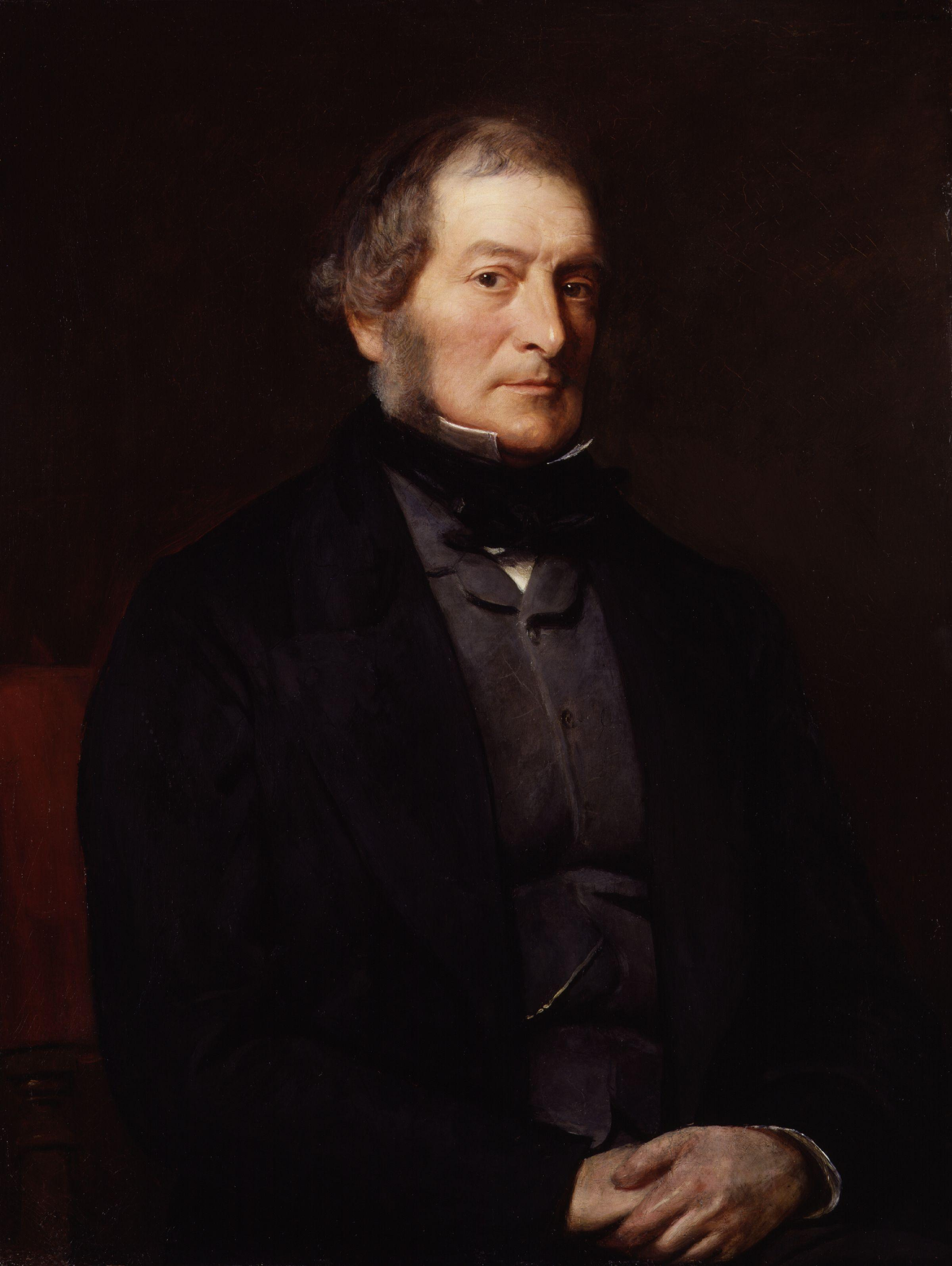
Henry Labouchere, 1st Baron Taunton, portrait by William Menzies Tweedie

In 1843 Tweedie exhibited a portrait in oils at the Royal Scottish Academy. In 1847 his Summer appeared at the Royal Academy. He did not exhibit there again till 1856, when he sent a portrait of Austen Henry Layard. He exhibited four pictures, studies and figure-subjects, at the British Institution, 1857–60, and 33 in all, portraits with only a few exceptions, at the Royal Academy. His pictures were not always accepted at the Academy, and after 1874 they were always refused.
