= St Clere, Kent =

St Clere
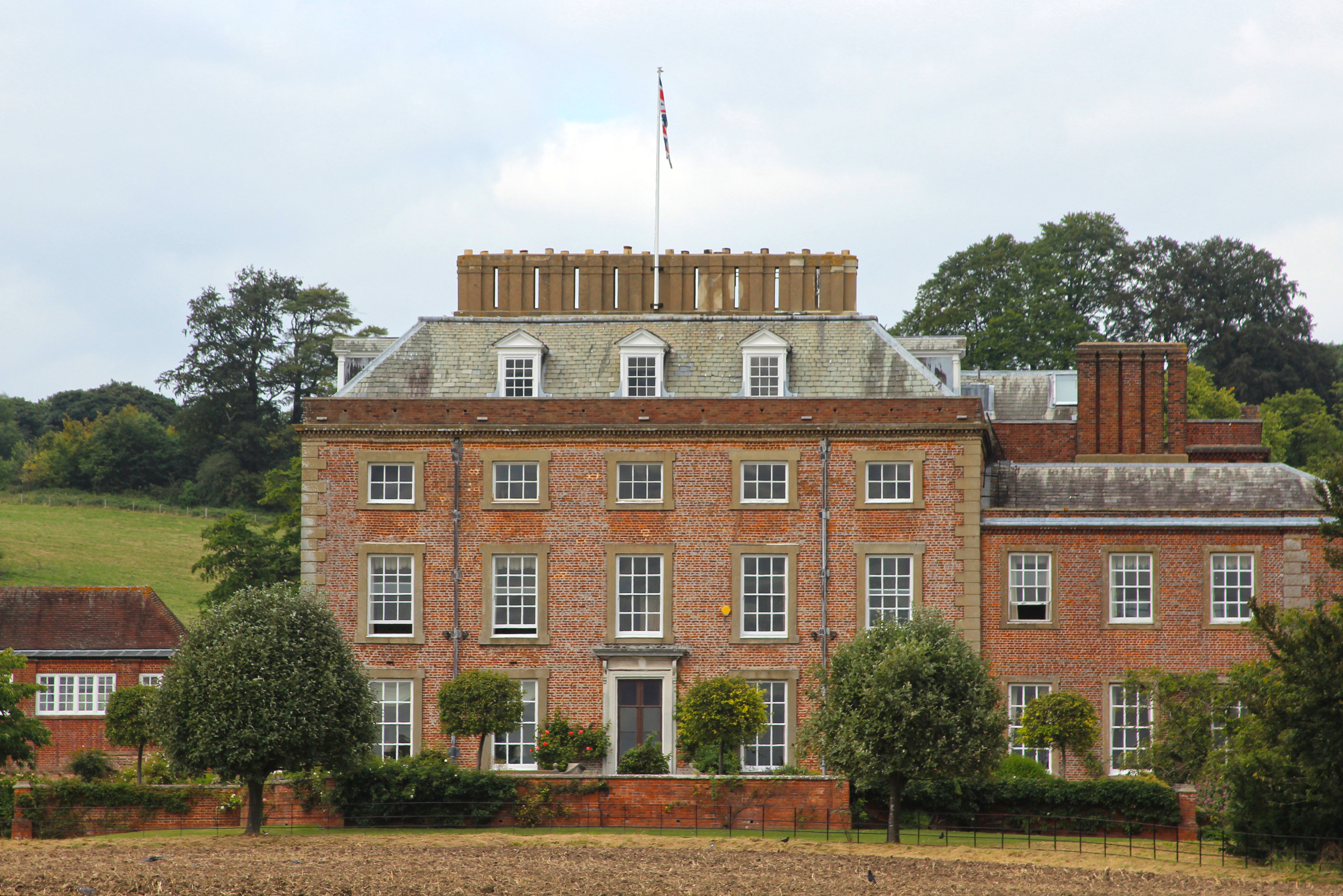

- Location within Kent

General information
- Type: Country house
- Location: Kemsing, Kent, England
- Coordinates: 51.30936°N 0.26105°E
- Completed: 17th century

St Clere is a Grade I listed 17th-century country house in Kemsing, Kent, England.

The house is built in brick in three storeys plus basement and attic. It has a five bay front facade with a 19th-century central porch and a parapet. The high pitched hipped slated roof is surmounted by a row of linked tall brick chimneys. Extensions have been built to the side. Within the house is a chimneypiece by Sir John Soane, which was brought from the old Bank of England.

== History ==
In the 13th century, the property was known as Aldham and owned by a family of the same name, later passing to the St Clere family. Aldham became Aldham St Cleres and eventually St Cleres. The St Clere family died out in the 1400s and the estate was acquired by Henry Lovell, who built a new house there. In 1625 it passed to Sir John Sedley, 2nd Baronet (of Great Chart), who built the present house. By the death of the 4th baronet in 1702 the house was somewhat neglected and was sold to William Glanville, MP (formerly William Evelyn), High Sheriff of Kent for 1757.

The house passed down in the Evelyn family via William Evelyn, MP and his son-in-law Alexander, who took the surname Evelyn and was High Sheriff of Kent for 1816. He left it to a cousin Lt-Col William John Evelyn, who rarely used the house and occasionally rented it out and in 1878 it was finally sold to Sir Mark Wilks Collet, Bt., a London merchant and later a Governor of the Bank of England.

Collet carried out a series of renovations to the buildings and grounds, as did his son and successor Sir Mark Edlman Collet. When the latter moved abroad in 1935 the estate passed to Montagu Norman, 1st Baron Norman, in whose family it remains.

== In popular culture ==
The house was the main filming location for The Mirror Crack'd, a 1980 British mystery film directed by Guy Hamilton based on Agatha Christie's thriller and starring Angela Lansbury as Miss Marple. The estate was also used to film scenes for television series The Great, and the British action series Gangs of London.
