= Mark Norman (banker) =

English banker

- Born: April 5, 1910; London, United Kingdom
- Died: December 6, 1994 (aged 84)
- Education: Magdalen College, Oxford
- Occupation: Merchant banker
- Spouse: Helen Bryan (m. 1933)
- Children: 5

Mark Richard Norman CBE (3 April 1910 – 6 December 1994) was an English banker from the Norman family. He was a managing director of Lazard Brothers, the merchant bankers from 1960 to 1975 and chairman of Gallaher, the cigarette manufacturers.

Norman combined his respective careers in the City and industry with a prominent role in the affairs of the National Trust — an interest he inherited from his father, Ronald Collet Norman. Norman took over as deputy chairman of the Trust in 1977. Faced with rising maintenance costs and a rapid expansion of the property portfolio, he guarded short-term solvency while keeping a clear eye on long-term liabilities.

== Early life and education ==
Mark Richard Norman was born in London on 5 April 1910, into a City family connected with the banking house of Brown, Shipley & Co. His uncle Montagu Norman, was a long-serving governor of the Bank of England, and both his paternal great-grandfathers were directors. His mother Lady Florence Bridgeman, was a daughter of the 4th Earl of Bradford. His father was chairman of the Board of Governors of the BBC (1935-1940) and of the London County Council (1915-1917). He also served as vice-chairman of the National Trust during the 1930s, but declined the chairmanship, because he was not himself a great landowner. Ronald Collet Norman also placed the Trust's finance committee on a more professional footing; it subsequently fell to his son to chair that committee through the difficult economic circumstances of the 1970s.

Mark Norman was educated at Eton and Magdalen College, Oxford, where he read history. In 1930 he joined Gallahers, but he later moved to the City in 1932 to join Lazard Brothers, taking posts in London, Paris and Berlin.

== Military service ==
In 1939 Norman enlisted in the Hertfordshire Yeomanry, before transferring to the Special Operations Executive, joining a six-man team led by the journalist and explorer Peter Fleming. Their task formulated by Churchill, was to recruit Italian POWs in Egypt to the Allied cause, and then to hold back the German advance in Greece. Norman was badly wounded escaping from Greece, and on his return to England became an assistant military secretary in the War Cabinet offices; he later attended the Potsdam Conference, and was promoted to lieutenant-colonel.

== Career ==
After the war Norman became a partner in the small merchant-banking firm of Edward de Stein, which merged with Lazards in 1960. A managing director of Lazards from the merger until 1975, Norman was noted for his strong empathy with industrial clients. It was this quality that brought him the chairmanship of Gallahers in 1963; he served until 1975 when after a long courtship, the firm became a subsidiary of American Brands. "Independence is sweet," Norman remarked, "but there comes a time when matrimony is attractive too." He was also chairman of Wiggins Teape, and a director of various companies.

== Personal life ==
He married in 1933, Helen Bryan, a Virginian whom he had met during his apprenticeship in the tobacco business; they had two sons and three daughters. Their son David Norman became a successful city figure in his own right.

== Recognition ==
When he retired in 1980 the Trust's annual report noted that he had guided its financial affairs "with a flair which approaches genius".

His perspective on the Trust was much broader than its financial aspect. Contrary to the recommendations of the 1968 Benson Committee, he argued successfully for the devolution of power to the Trust's regional chairmen — "a splendid lot", he called them, though some were reputedly "embryo brigands". Shown plans to rebuild derelict outbuildings at Erddig in Clwyd, his first response to the local agent was one of disbelief. But he helped to steer through the proposal, and in due course the outbuildings became a celebrated feature of the Erddig restoration, which was opened in 1977.

Norman was appointed OBE in 1945 and CBE in 1977. He derived much pleasure from Moor Place, the Hertfordshire house acquired by his grandfather, where he had lived since boyhood.
