= Edward Johnson (British politician) =

English politician

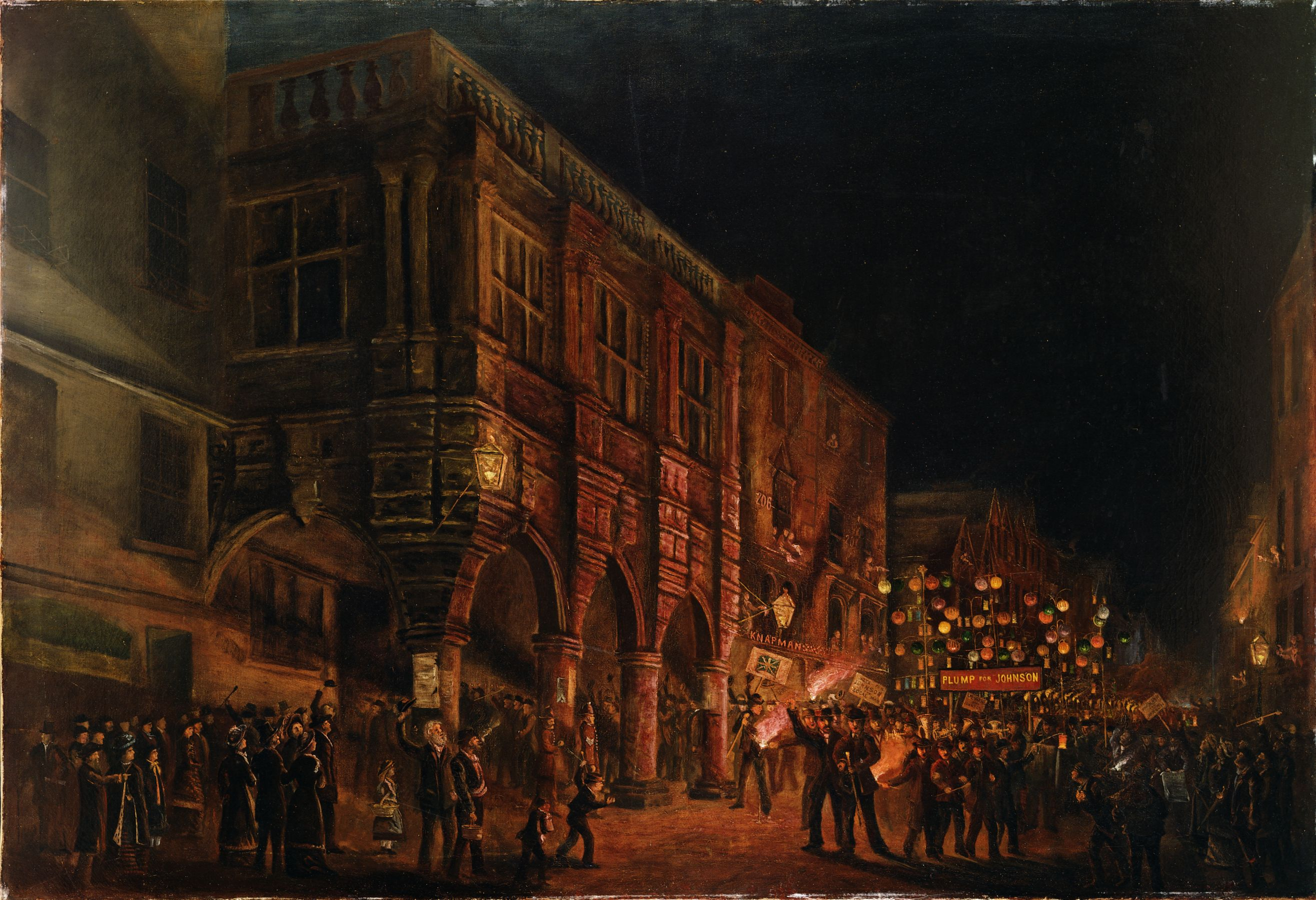
A painting by Alfred George Palmer of the 1880 election night in the Royal Albert Memorial Museum's collection (333/1997)

Edward Johnson (1833 - 2 November 1894) was an English Liberal politician who sat in the House of Commons from 1880 to 1885.

Johnson was the son of John Johnson of St Osyth's Priory, Essex, and his wife Ann Haward, daughter of William Haward of Battersea. He was educated at King's College London and became a merchant in London. He was J.P. for Devon.

At the 1880 general election Johnson was elected Member of Parliament for Exeter. He held the seat until 1885 when the representation was reduced from two members to one under the Redistribution of Seats Act 1885.

Johnson died in Algiers at the age of 61.

Johnson married Eliza Matilda Pellier daughter of Philip Pellier of Jersey, in 1855 and they had one child. His wife died prior to his election as an MP.

Parliament of the United Kingdom
Preceded by Arthur Mills; John George Johnson	Member of Parliament for Exeter; 1880–1885; With: Henry Northcote	Succeeded by Henry Northcote
