= John George Johnson =

English Conservative Party politician

John Johnson MP

Member of Parliament for Exeter
- In office 31 January 1874 – 31 March 1880 Serving with Arthur Mills
- Preceded by: John Coleridge; Edgar Alfred Bowring
- Succeeded by: Edward Johnson; Henry Northcote

High Sheriff of Devon
- In office 1 January 1872 – 31 December 1872
- Preceded by: Lydston Newman
- Succeeded by: John Henry Ley

Personal details
- Born: 1829
- Died: 1896 (aged 66–67)
- Party: Conservative

John George Johnson (1829–1896) was an English Conservative Party politician.

He was elected Conservative MP for Exeter in 1874 but was defeated at the following election in 1880.

During 1872, he was also High Sheriff of Devon. He married Frances Grace Brinckman, daughter of Sir Theodore Brinckman, 1st Baronet.

Parliament of the United Kingdom
Preceded by John Coleridge and Edgar Alfred Bowring	Member of Parliament for Exeter; 1874 – 1880; With: Arthur Mills	Succeeded by Edward Johnson and Henry Northcote
