= Henry Labouchere, 1st Baron Taunton =

British Whig and Liberal Party politician

The Right Honourable The Lord Taunton PC
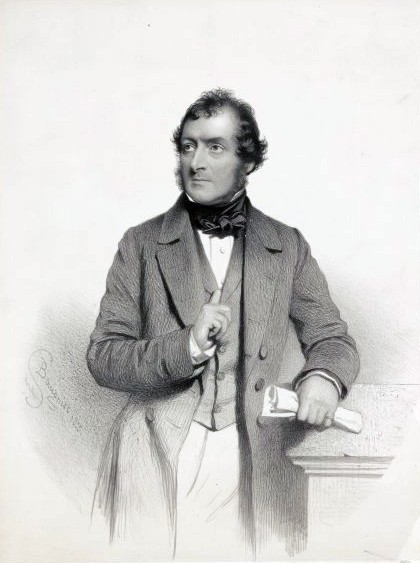
- Lord Taunton (1855) by Charles Baugniet.

President of the Board of Trade
- In office 29 August 1838 – 30 August 1841
- Monarch: Victoria
- Prime Minister: The Viscount Melbourne
- Preceded by: Charles Poulett Thomson
- Succeeded by: The Earl of Ripon
- In office 22 July 1847 – 21 February 1852
- Monarch: Victoria
- Prime Minister: Lord John Russell
- Preceded by: The Earl of Clarendon
- Succeeded by: J. W. Henley

Secretary of State for the Colonies
- In office 21 November 1855 – 21 February 1858
- Monarch: Victoria
- Prime Minister: The Viscount Palmerston
- Preceded by: Sir William Molesworth, Bt
- Succeeded by: Lord Stanley

Chief Secretary for Ireland
- In office 1846 – 22 July 1847
- Monarch: Victoria
- Prime Minister: Lord John Russell
- Preceded by: The Earl of Lincoln
- Succeeded by: Sir William Somerville

Personal details
- Born: 15 August 1798 Marylebone, London, England
- Died: 13 July 1869 (aged 70) Belgrave Square, London, England
- Resting place: Over Stowey, Somerset, England
- Party: Whig; Liberal Party
- Spouse(s): (1) Frances Baring (1813–1850) (2) Lady Mary Howard (d. 1892)
- Education: University of Oxford

Henry Labouchere, 1st Baron Taunton, PC (/læbuːˈʃɛər/; 15 August 1798 – 13 July 1869) was a British Whig and Liberal Party politician of the mid-19th century.

== Background and education ==
Labouchere was born in London into a prominent family, the son of Peter Cesar Labouchere of Hylands, a Dutch-born banker of French Huguenot ancestry who had settled in England, and his wife Dorothy Elizabeth, daughter of Sir Francis Baring. He was educated at Winchester College and Christ Church, Oxford, where he took his B.A. (1821) and his M.A. (1828).

== Political career ==
In 1826, Labouchere became MP for St Michael, as a Whig. In 1830, he moved to the Taunton seat, which he held until 1859. In 1835 he was opposed by Benjamin Disraeli for the Taunton seat; Labouchere won by 452 votes to 282. He was first appointed to office by Lord Grey in 1832, serving as Civil Lord of the Admiralty . After beginning the second Melbourne ministry as Master of the Mint, Privy Counsellor, and Vice-President of the Board of Trade (and, later, Under-Secretary of State for War and the Colonies), Labouchere was raised to a cabinet post, President of the Board of Trade, which he held from 1839 until the Melbourne government fell in 1841.

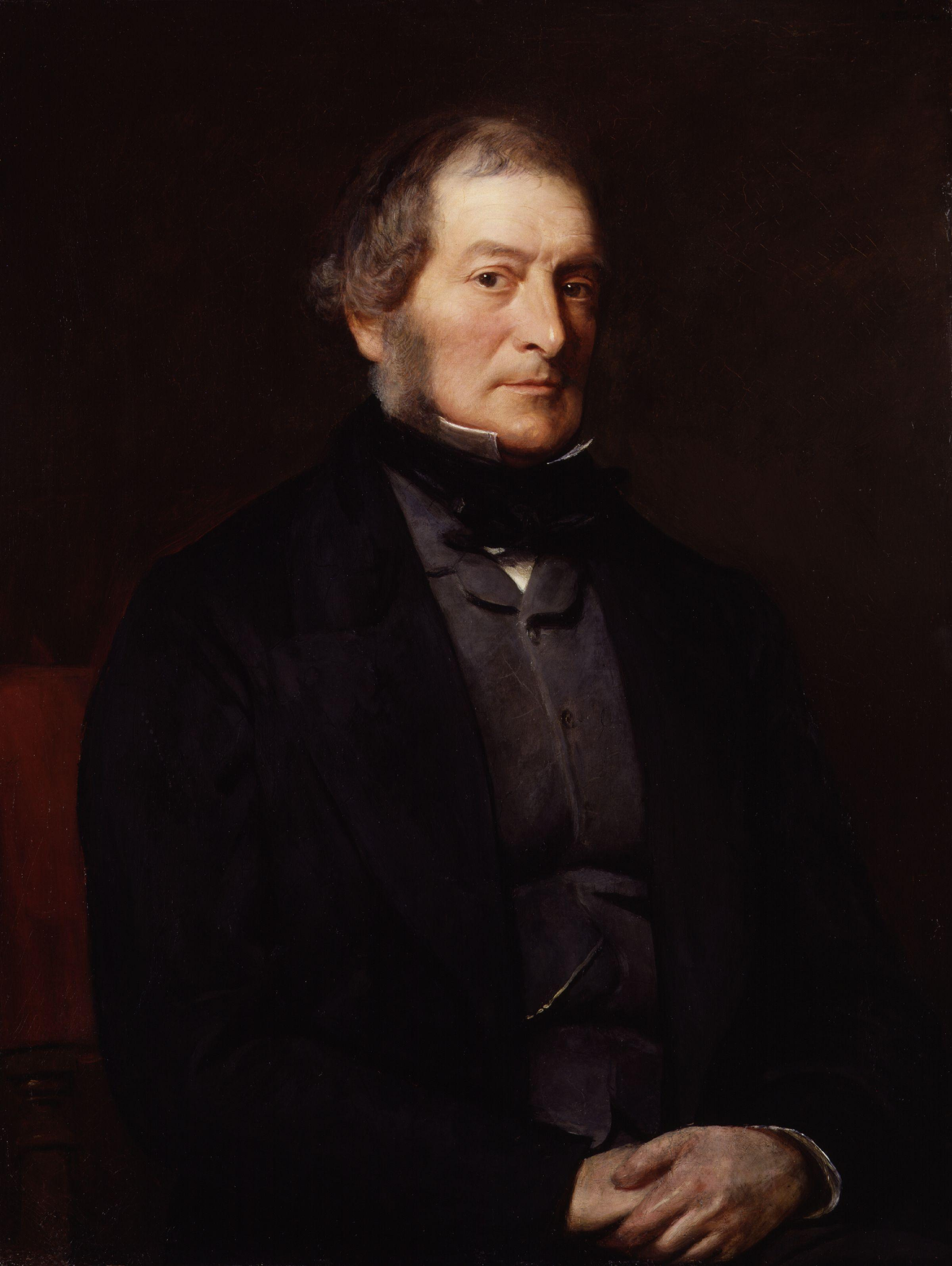
Lord Taunton by William Menzies Tweedie, 1863.

When the Whigs, now led by Lord John Russell, returned to office in 1846, Labouchere returned to the cabinet, this time as Chief Secretary for Ireland. Under his administration the worst effects of the Great Irish Famine began to be felt in Ireland. The following year, he once again became President of the Board of Trade, and stayed in that post until Russell's government fell in 1852. From 1853 to 1854 he sat on the Royal Commission on the City of London. Labouchere's final cabinet posting came during the first Palmerston ministry, for which he served as Secretary of State for the Colonies from 1855 to 1858. In 1859, Labouchere was raised to the peerage as Baron Taunton, of Taunton in the County of Somerset. Between 1864 and 1868 the then Lord Taunton chaired the Schools Enquiry Commission.

== Family ==
In 1840 Labouchere married his first cousin Frances, daughter of Sir Thomas Baring. They had three daughters:

- Emily (1844–1933) who married Henry Eliot, 5th Earl of St Germans
- Mina Francis, who married Sir Arthur Ellis
- Mary Dorothy who married Edward James Stanley MP

Frances Labouchere died in May 1850, aged 36, in premature childbirth.

In 1852 Labouchere married Lady Mary Howard (1823–1892), a daughter of the Earl of Carlisle. There were no children from this marriage. Lady Mary was buried at St Mary's Church, Charlynch, Somerset where a reredos was erected in 1893 in her memory.

Taunton died in July 1869, aged 70, at his London house in Belgrave Square. He was buried near his country house Quantock Lodge at Over Stowey. As he had no sons, the barony became extinct on his death. His nephew, also Henry Labouchere, inherited part of his fortune, and later became a well-known newspaper editor and politician.

== Arms ==
Coat of arms of Henry Labouchere, 1st Baron Taunton
Crest A stork Argent holding in the beak a lotus-flower Proper. Escutcheon Quarterly Ermine and Azure in the 2nd and 3rd quarters a cross patonce Or. Supporters On either side a stork Argent holding in the beak a lotus-flower Proper. Motto Passibus Citis Sed Æquis

Parliament of the United Kingdom
Preceded by Sir George Staunton, Bt; William Taylor Money	Member of Parliament for Mitchell; 1826–1830; With: William Leake	Succeeded by Hon. Lloyd Kenyon; John Heywood Hawkins
Preceded by Henry Seymour; William Peachey	Member of Parliament for Taunton; 1830–1859; With: Edward Thomas Bainbridge, 1830–1842; Sir Thomas Colebrooke, Bt, 1842–1852; Arthur Mills, 1852–1853; Sir John William Ramsden, 1853–1857; Arthur Mills, 1857–1859	Succeeded by Arthur Mills; George Cavendish-Bentinck
Political offices
Preceded by Viscount Lowther	Vice-President of the Board of Trade; 1835–1839	Succeeded by Richard Lalor Sheil
Preceded by Charles Thomson	President of the Board of Trade; 1839–1841	Succeeded by The Earl of Ripon
Preceded by The Earl of Lincoln	Chief Secretary for Ireland; 1846–1847	Succeeded by Sir William Somerville, Bt
Preceded by The Earl of Clarendon	President of the Board of Trade; 1847–1852	Succeeded by Joseph Warner Henley
Preceded by Sir William Molesworth, Bt	Secretary of State for the Colonies; 1855–1858	Succeeded by Lord Stanley
Peerage of the United Kingdom
New creation	Baron Taunton; 1859–1869	Title extinct
