= Sir Mark Collet, 1st Baronet =

British banker

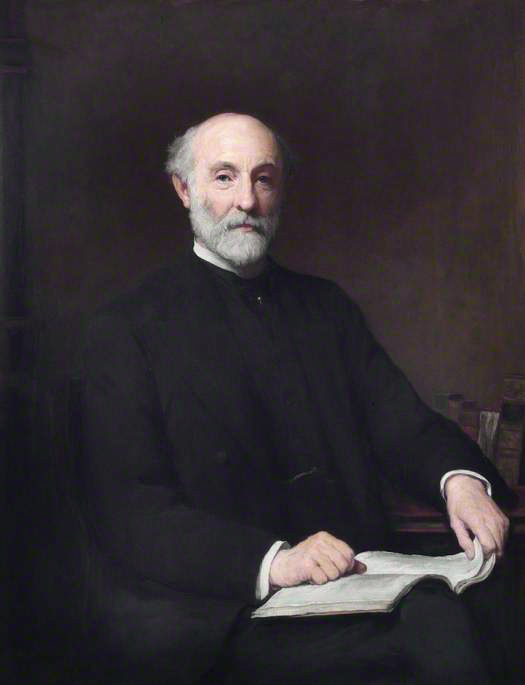
Mark Wilks Collet (Walter William Ouless)

Sir Mark Wilks Collet, 1st Baronet (September 1816 – 25 April 1905) was an English merchant and banker. He served as Governor of the Bank of England between 1887 and 1889 and was made a baronet on 12 June 1888 in connection with his services in converting the National Debt (retirement of Consols). He was also a Lieutenant for the City of London.

== Banking career ==
He opened the London branch of a Liverpool bank, Brown, Shipley & Co., (later Brown Brothers & Harriman, one of the most powerful banks in modern American history), in 1864 and died as senior partner of that bank. In 1866, he became a director of the Bank of England, then its Deputy Governor and finally its Governor, remaining a director until his death in 1905.

His grandson, Montagu Norman, would also serve as Bank of England Governor between 1920 and 1944.

== Family ==
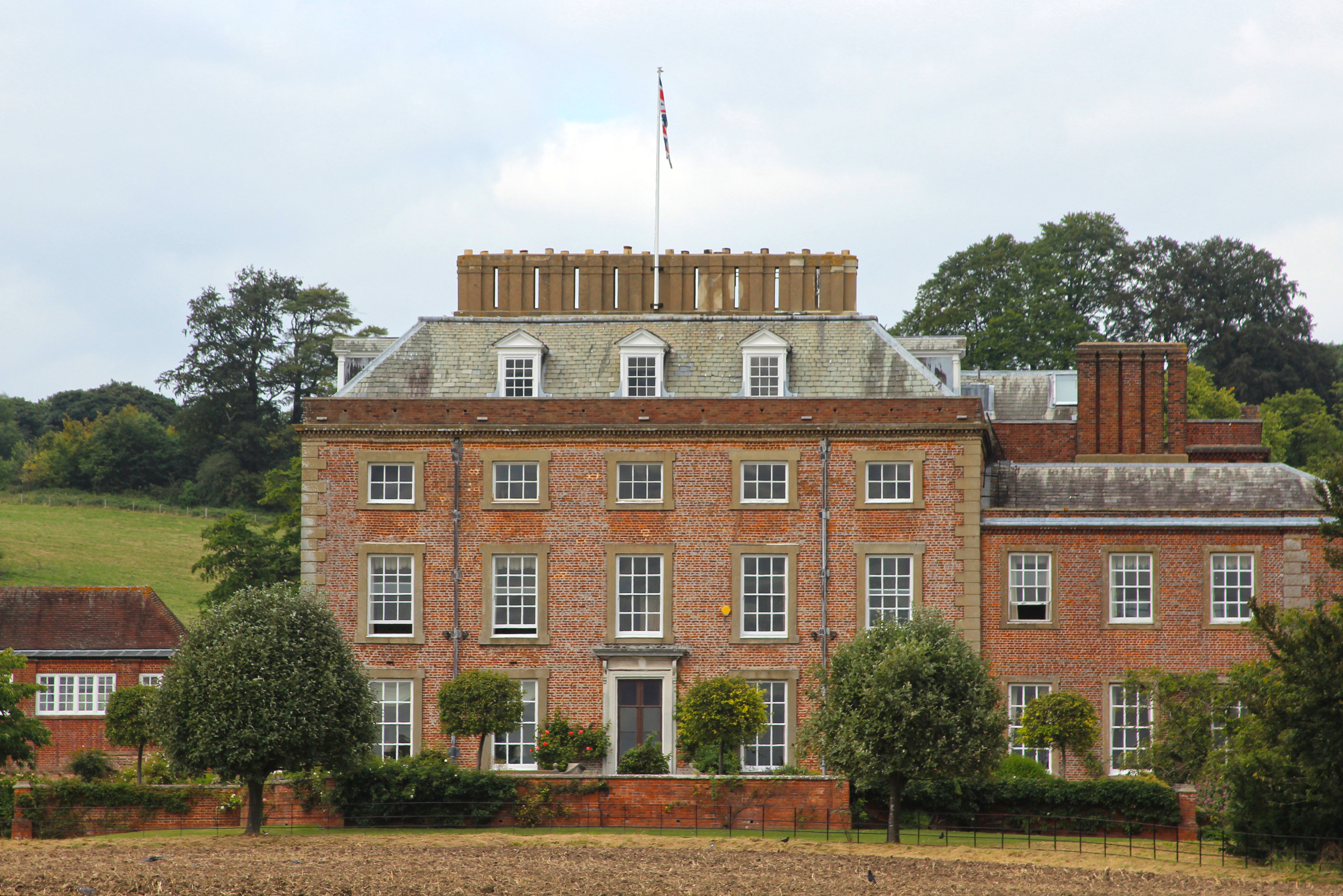
St Clere, near Sevenoaks, Kent

Mark Wilks Collet was one of the three sons of James Collet (27 July 1784 – ) and his wife Wendelina Elizabeth, daughter of Abraham Van Brienen, whom he married in 1812 at Archangel, Russia. James Collet was the son of Capt. John Corlett or Collet (1751–1814), a sea captain born in Douglas, Isle of Man, who settled in Philadelphia, PA, and his wife Ann Wilks (1758–1840)

Collet married firstly Susannah (or Susan) Gertrude Eyre (d. 22 July 1851, Liverpool, aged 29), the youngest daughter of the Rev. James Eyre, by whom he had a daughter, Lina Susan Penelope Collet. She married, on 15 November 1870, Frederick Henry Norman (1839–1916), himself the son of a prominent British banker. Her eldest son became the Right Hon. Montagu Collet Norman, later Lord Norman, Privy Councillor, and Governor of the Bank of England from 1920 to 1944. Another son was Ronald Collet Norman.

By a second marriage to Antonia Edlmann, he had a son, Sir Mark Edlmann Collet (1864–1944).

In 1878, he bought and renovated the country house of St. Clere, in Kemsing, Kent.

== Notes ==
Government offices
Preceded by James Pattison Currie	Governor of the Bank of England; 1887–1889	Succeeded by William Lidderdale
Baronetage of the United Kingdom
New creation	Baronet (of St. Clere, Kent); 1888–1905	Succeeded by Mark Edlmann Collet
