= 1873 Exeter by-election =

UK parliamentary by-election

The 1873 Exeter by-election was held on 9 December 1873, due to the resignation of the incumbent MP of the Liberal Party, John Coleridge, and was won by the Conservative candidate, Arthur Mills.
