= William Lidderdale =

British merchant and banker (1832–1902)

The Right Honourable William Lidderdale
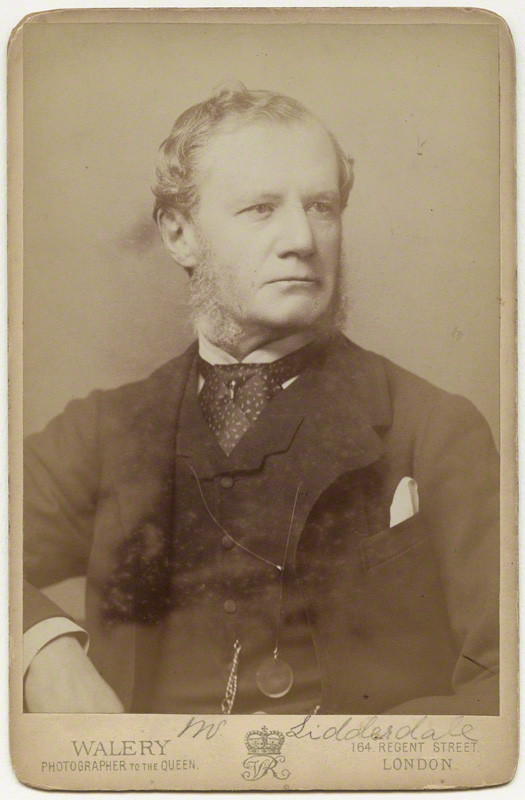
- Born: 4 July 1832; Saint Petersburg
- Died: 26 June 1902 (aged 69); London
- Occupation: governor of the Bank of England
- Known for: Panic of 1890
- Spouse: Mary Martha Busk
- Children: 8

William Lidderdale PC (4 July 1832 – 26 June 1902) was a British merchant, and governor of the Bank of England between 1889 and 1892.

== Life ==
Lidderdale was born to British parents at the British Chaplaincy in Saint Petersburg, Russia, and was educated at Birkenhead in Cheshire.

After working for the Russian merchants Heath and Co, he joined the Liverpool merchant house of Rathbone Brothers, working in their New York City office from 1857 to 1863. He was made a partner in 1864, and went on to establish the firm's London office.

He became a Bank of England director in 1870, becoming Deputy Governor in 1887, and Governor in 1889.

Lidderdale's period in office is notable for his handling of the Barings crisis, cause of the 'Panic of 1890'. Barings became over-extended in underwriting Argentine debt, the value of which strongly declined following political unrest in Buenos Aires, and the recognition of the inefficient use of borrowed funds. Lidderdale organised a successful consortium to rescue the bank. In recognition, he was granted the Freedom of the City of London and was made a member of the British Privy Council.

Lidderdale lived at Ascot Place at North Ascot in Winkfield, Berkshire. He became a commissioner of the Patriotic Fund in 1893, and held (among other financial offices) the presidency of the council of the Corporation of Foreign Bondholders.

He died on 26 June 1902 at 55 Montagu Square, London, W., and was buried at Winkfield, near Windsor.

== Family ==
He married in 1868, Mary Martha, elder daughter of Wadsworth Dawson Busk of Winkfield. Berkshire (formerly of St. Petersburg), by his wife Elizabeth Thielcke. They had eight children; four sons and three daughters survived him.

His daughter Constance Margaret (1877 - 1936) married Hervey Wedgwood Vaughan Williams, brother of Ralph Vaughan Williams and great nephew of Charles Darwin.

== Cultural references ==
- Appears as a minor character in the historical-mystery novel Stone's Fall, by Iain Pears.

Government offices
Preceded by Mark Wilks Collet	Governor of the Bank of England; 1889–1892	Succeeded by David Powell
