= Northcote Farm School =

Coordinates: 37°42′58″S 144°19′01″E

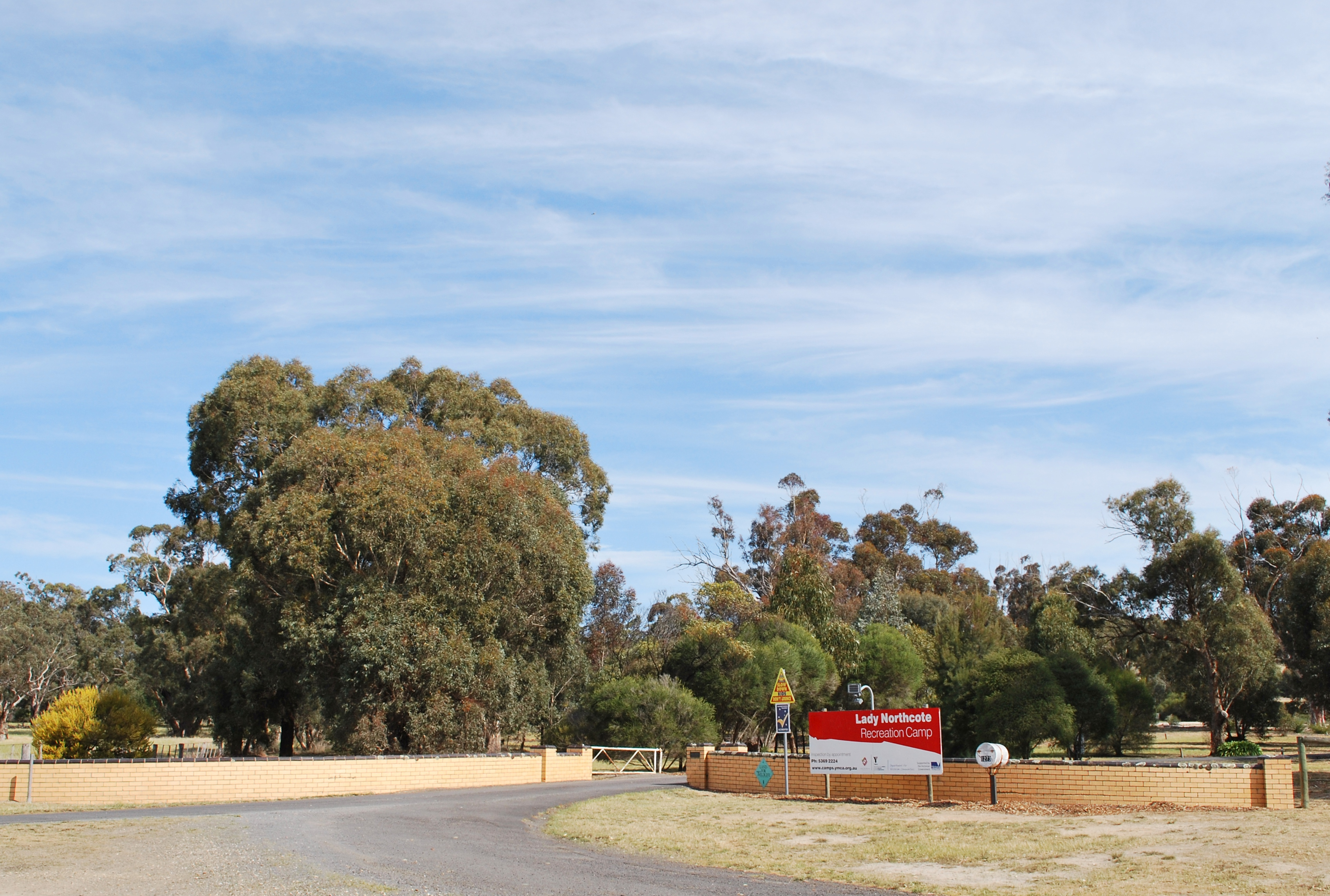
Entrance to the Lady Northcote Recreation Camp, 2011

The Northcote Farm School (NFS) (also known as the Lady Northcote Farm School) was a farm school built at Glenmore, near Bacchus Marsh, Victoria, in 1937.

It was constructed for the education of child migrants, of whom it received 273 from 1937 to the 1970s; it was closed from 1944 to 1948 due to the decline in child migrants during World War II. It was shut down in the late 1970s due to the redistribution of funds, and now operates as a school camp.

NFS is listed on the Victorian Heritage Register, as having "historical, architectural and social significance to the State of Victoria".
