= Edgar Alfred Bowring =

British politician and translator (1826–1911)

Edgar Alfred Bowring (/ˈboʊrɪŋ/; 26 May 1826 – 8 August 1911) was a British translator, author and civil servant, serving as a librarian and registrar to the Board of Trade (1848–1863), secretary to the Royal Commission for the Exhibition of 1851, and Liberal Member of Parliament for Exeter (1868–1874).

He was the youngest son of Sir John Bowring (1792–1872), of Exeter, Devon, Governor of Hong Kong and also a traveller and translator of literary works, and was brother of John Charles Bowring and Lewin Bentham Bowring.

He translated various works of poetry from German into English.

== Works ==
- Free Trade and Its So-Called Sophisms: A Reply to 'Sophisms of Free Trade, etc., Examined by a Barrister' with Lord Vere Henry Hobart (1850)
- The Most Holy Book of Psalms Literally Rendered Into English Verse, According to the Prayer Book Version (1858)

== Translations ==
- The Poems of Schiller (1851)
- The Poems of Goethe (1853)
- The Poems of Heine Complete (1861)
- The Works of Frederick Schiller, vol. 5: the poems of Schiller (1875)
- The Tragedies of Vittorio Alfieri (1876) (revisions of the 1815 translations of Charles Lloyd)
- The dramatic works of J. W. Goethe, translated from the German with Sir Walter Scott, and Anna Swanwick and others (1880)

== Notes ==
Parliament of the United Kingdom
Preceded by John Coleridge; The Viscount Courtenay	Member of Parliament for Exeter; 1868–1874; With: John Coleridge 1868–1873; Arthur Mills 1873–1874	Succeeded by Arthur Mills; John George Johnson
