= Arthur Mills (MP) =

British politician

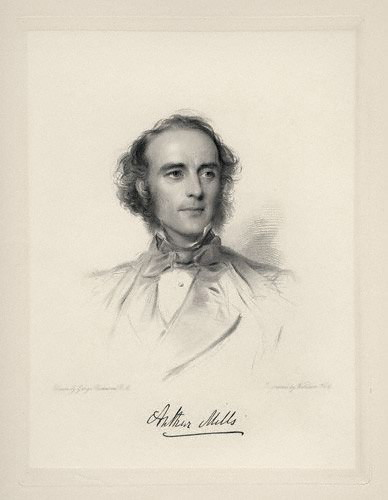
- Stipple engraving by William Holl, Jr., 1863
- Born: Arthur Mills; 20 February 1816; Barford, Warwickshire, United Kingdom
- Died: 12 October 1898 (aged 82); United Kingdom
- Citizenship: England; Great Britain
- Occupations: M.P., barrister, magistrate, author
- Spouse: Agnes Lucy Dyke Acland (1821-1895)
- Children: Revd Barton R. V. Mills, son (1857-1932); Col. Dudley Acland Mills, son (1859-1938)
- Relatives: Sir Thomas Dyke Acland, 10th Baronet, father-in-law John Acland (brother-in-law); George Mills (writer), author, schoolmaster, and grandson Arthur F. H. Mills, novelist and grandson Lady Dorothy Mills, novelist, travel writer, and granddaughter-in-law
- Writing career
- Period: Victorian England
- Subjects: 19th century Colonial politics and economics
- Notable works: Colonial Military Expenditure (E. Stanford: London, 1863); Colonial Constitutions (John Murray: London, 1856); India in 1858 (John Murray: London, 1858); Systematic Colonisation (John Murray: London, 1848)
- Website: www.whoisgeorgemills.com

Arthur Mills (20 February 1816 – 12 October 1898) was a British Conservative Party Member of Parliament (MP). In his career, he was also a barrister, magistrate, and author in Cornwall and London. His travels to the 19th century British colonies and his studies of their finances and systems of governance made him an expert in the field.

== Family ==
Mills was born in Barford, Warwickshire in 1816. He was the first surviving son (the second son born) of Revd Francis Mills and Lady Catherine Mordaunt. He was educated at Rugby School under Dr. Thomas Arnold. He attended Balliol College in 1835 and earned an M.A. from Oxford in 1838.

Arthur Mills married Lady Agnes Lucy Dyke Acland, daughter of Sir Thomas Dyke Acland, 10th Baronet of Killerton, Devon, and Lydia Elizabeth Hoare on 3 August 1848. They had two sons, Revd Barton R. V. Mills and Col. Dudley Acland Mills of the Corps of Royal Engineers.

Grandchildren of Arthur Mills included children's book author and schoolmaster George Mills, crime and adventure novelist Arthur F. H. Mills, and Arthur Hobart Mills' wife, Lady Dorothy Mills, the renowned novelist, explorer, and travel writer. From 1873 to 1885 Mills was a member of the London School Board representing Marylebone.

== Career ==
Mills became a barrister when he was called to the bar at the Inner Temple, London, in 1842. He joined the Canterbury Association on 25 October 1849. He was an MP for Taunton (1852–1853 and 1857–1865) and Exeter (1873–1880).

== Notable publications ==
Two of his publications, India in 1858 (1858) and Systematic Colonization (1847) are still in print, the former still being the definitive work on the costs and conditions of the Indian Rebellion of 1857. The manuscript for India in 1858 was proofed by his friend John Stuart Mill. In Systematic Colonization, Mills advocates a colonial policy based on seeking to "protect the moral and political health" of colonies in the British Empire. However, his policy of systematic colonization was primarily intended to benefit white British settlers; he stated that "the extermination of native races by force or fraud may be a necessary precedent condition of the civilization of the countries they inhabit".

== Death ==
He died on 12 October 1898 at Efford Down, Budehaven, Cornwall.

Parliament of the United Kingdom
Preceded by Sir Thomas Colebrooke, Bt; Henry Labouchere	Member of Parliament for Taunton; 1852–1853; With: Henry Labouchere	Succeeded by Sir John Ramsden; Henry Labouchere
Preceded by Sir John Ramsden; Henry Labouchere	Member of Parliament for Taunton; 1857–1865; With: Henry Labouchere to 1859; George Cavendish-Bentinck 1859–65	Succeeded by Alexander Charles Barclay; Lord William Hay
Preceded by John Coleridge; Edgar Alfred Bowring	Member of Parliament for Exeter; 1873–1880; With: Edgar Alfred Bowring; John George Johnson	Succeeded by Edward Johnson; Henry Northcote
