= Henry Norman (cricketer) =

English cricketer

Henry Norman (12 December 1801 – 28 December 1867) was an English cricketer with amateur status. He was associated with Kent and Marylebone Cricket Club (MCC) and made his debut in 1827. He played for the Gentlemen against the Players.

== Bibliography ==
- Carlaw, Derek (2020). Kent County Cricketers, A to Z: Part One (1806–1914) (PDF). Cardiff: ACS.
- Haygarth, Arthur (1996) [1862]. Scores & Biographies, Volume 1 (1744–1826). Kennington: Frederick Lillywhite. ISBN 978-19-00592-23-9.
- Haygarth, Arthur (1997) [1862]. Scores & Biographies, Volume 2 (1827–1840). Kennington: Frederick Lillywhite. ISBN 978-19-00592-23-9.
