= Philip Norman (artist) =

English artist and cricketer

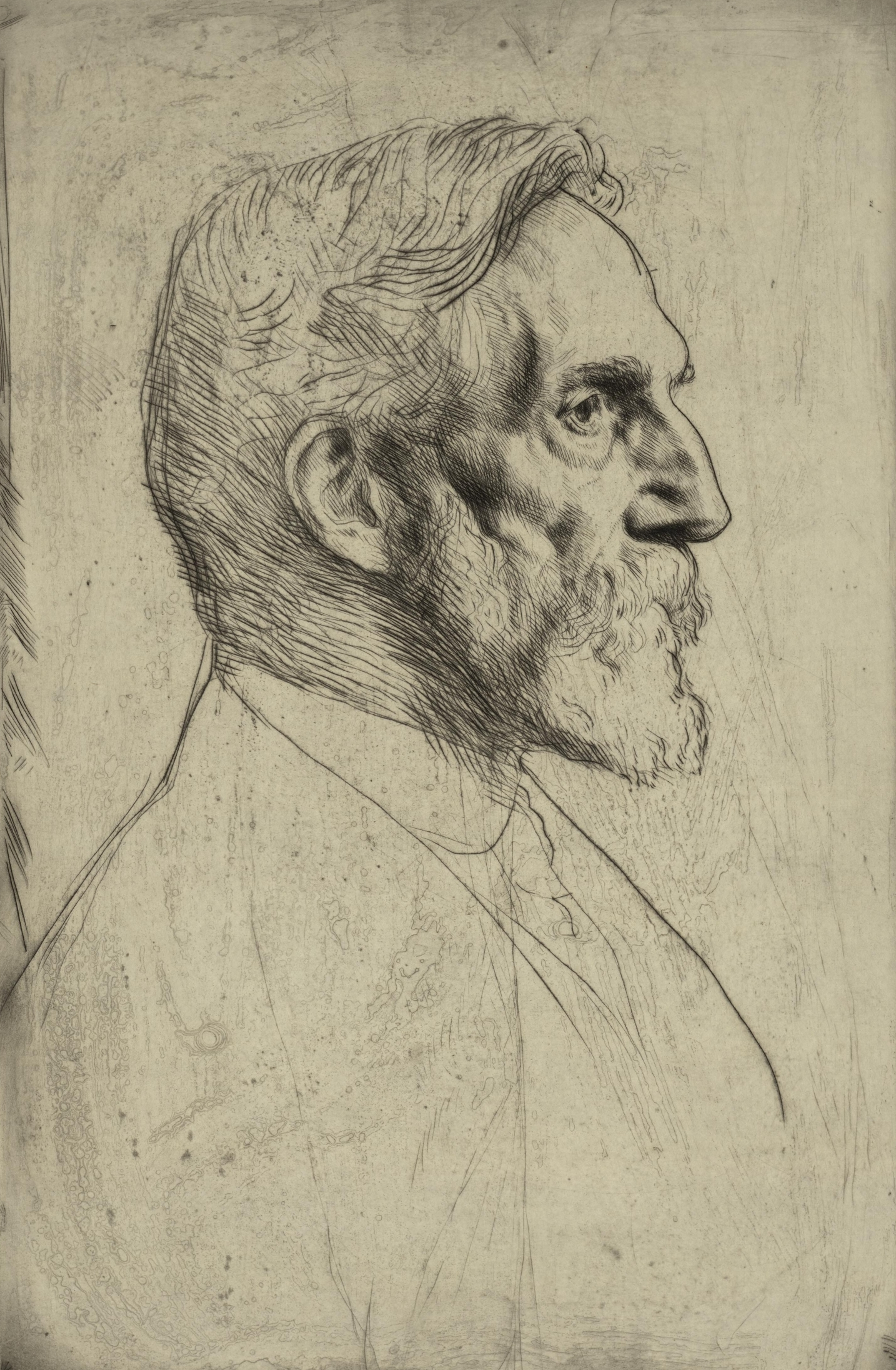
- Born: 9 July 1842; Bromley, England
- Died: 17 May 1931 (aged 88); London, England
- Occupation: Artist
- Parent: George Warde Norman
- Relatives: Frederick Norman (brother)

Philip E. Norman FSA (9 July 1842 – 17 May 1931) was a British artist, author and antiquary.

== Life ==
Born in 1842 in Bromley Common, Kent, Norman was the son of George Warde Norman (1793–1882), who was a director of the Bank of England, and writer on banking and currency, and brother of Frederick Norman, the merchant banker. He lived in London, and died on 17 May 1931 in South Kensington at the age of 88.

== Cricket ==
Norman was educated at Eton College, where he was a notable cricketer, and where, at the age of 17, he won the 120 yards hurdle race in the then record time of 18 seconds. He was later to play one season of first-class cricket in 1865 with the Gentlemen of Kent.

== Art ==
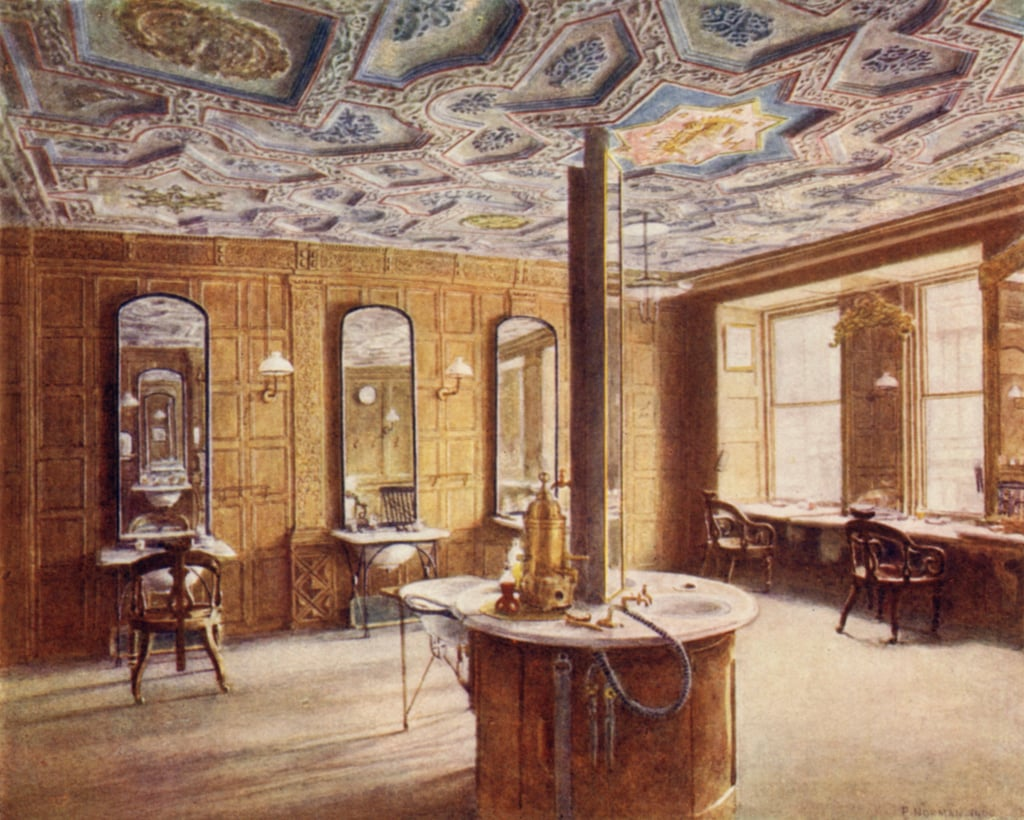
Room in Inner Temple Gate-house 1899 by Philip Norman

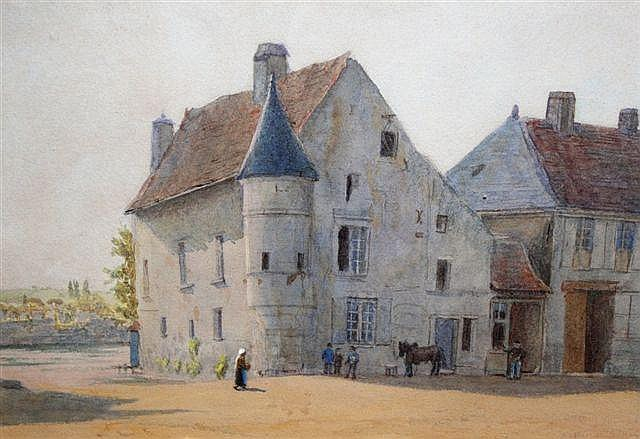
A French Chateau by Philip Norman (before 1931)

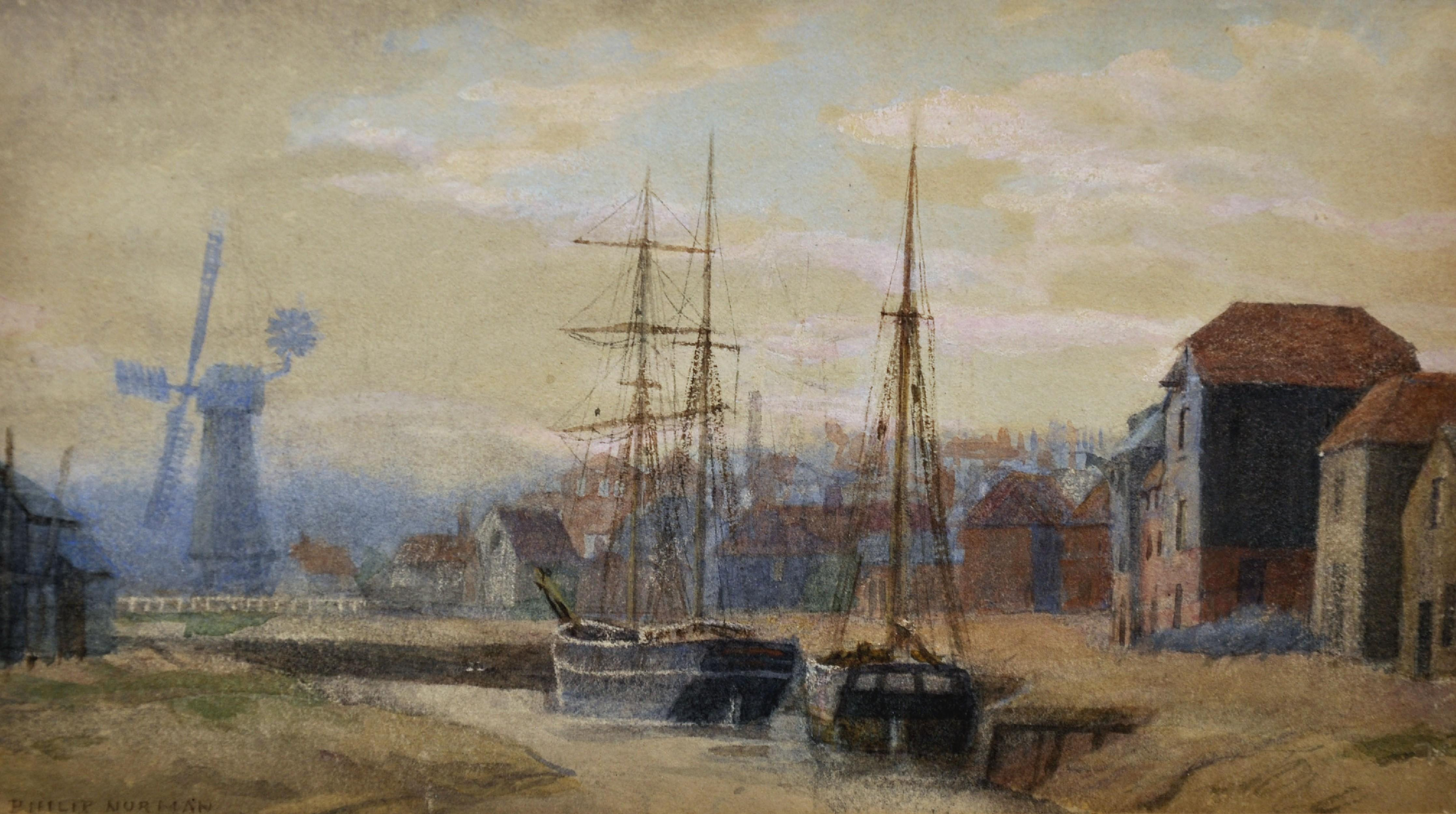
A canal scene by Philip Norman (before 1931)

Norman was trained as a draughtsman and painter in watercolours at the Slade School, often exhibiting at the Royal Academy. A large part of his work consisted of depicting parts of London that he knew, particularly buildings or areas which stood as a survivor of a bygone past or which were about to be demolished. Norman also recorded the history of the buildings which he painted or photographed, and works such as London Vanished and Vanishing, written in 1905, provide a fascinating record of bygone London. The historian Hermione Hobhouse has described Norman as one-third of the "triumvirate" of key figures whose works record the topography of London between 1890 and 1950, the others being Walter Hindes Godfrey and Percy Wells Lovell.

=== Exhibitions ===
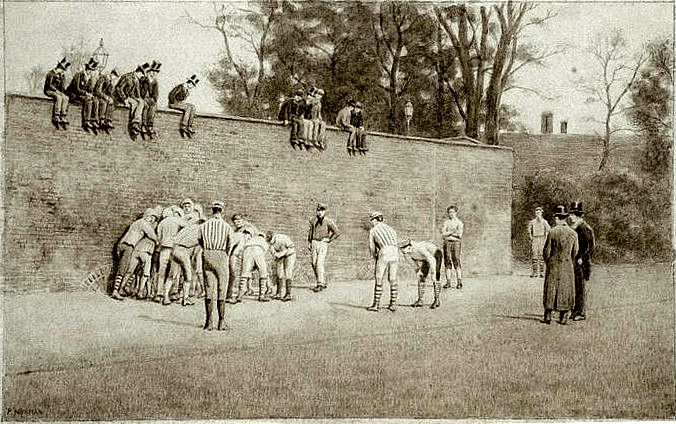
The Eton Wall Game by Philip Norman (before 1931)

Norman exhibited at the Royal Academy Summer Exhibition on at least 26 occasions from 1877 to 1926, and also at other galleries in London.

== Institutions ==
Norman was elected a Fellow of the Society of Antiquaries in 1886, acting as Treasurer from 1897 to 1913 and Vice-President from 1913 to 1917.

== Collections ==
Norman gave many of his works to the London Museum. His photographs are now held by the English Heritage Archive, and his watercolour paintings and drawings of London are kept by the Victoria and Albert Museum.

== Publications ==
Norman authored, illustrated or contributed to the following:

- London Signs and Inscriptions, London: Elliot Stock (1893)
- "London buildings photographed, 1860–1870", London Topographical Record, vol. 2 (1903), pp. 36–41
- London Vanished and Vanishing, London: Adam & Charles Black (1905)
- Survey of London, London County Council (1909).
- Cromwell House Highgate: its history and associations, London: John Murray (1917)
- The London City Churches, London: The London Society (1929)
