= Henry Northcote, 1st Baron Northcote =

British politician (1846–1911)

The Right Honourable The Lord Northcote GCMG GCIE CB PC
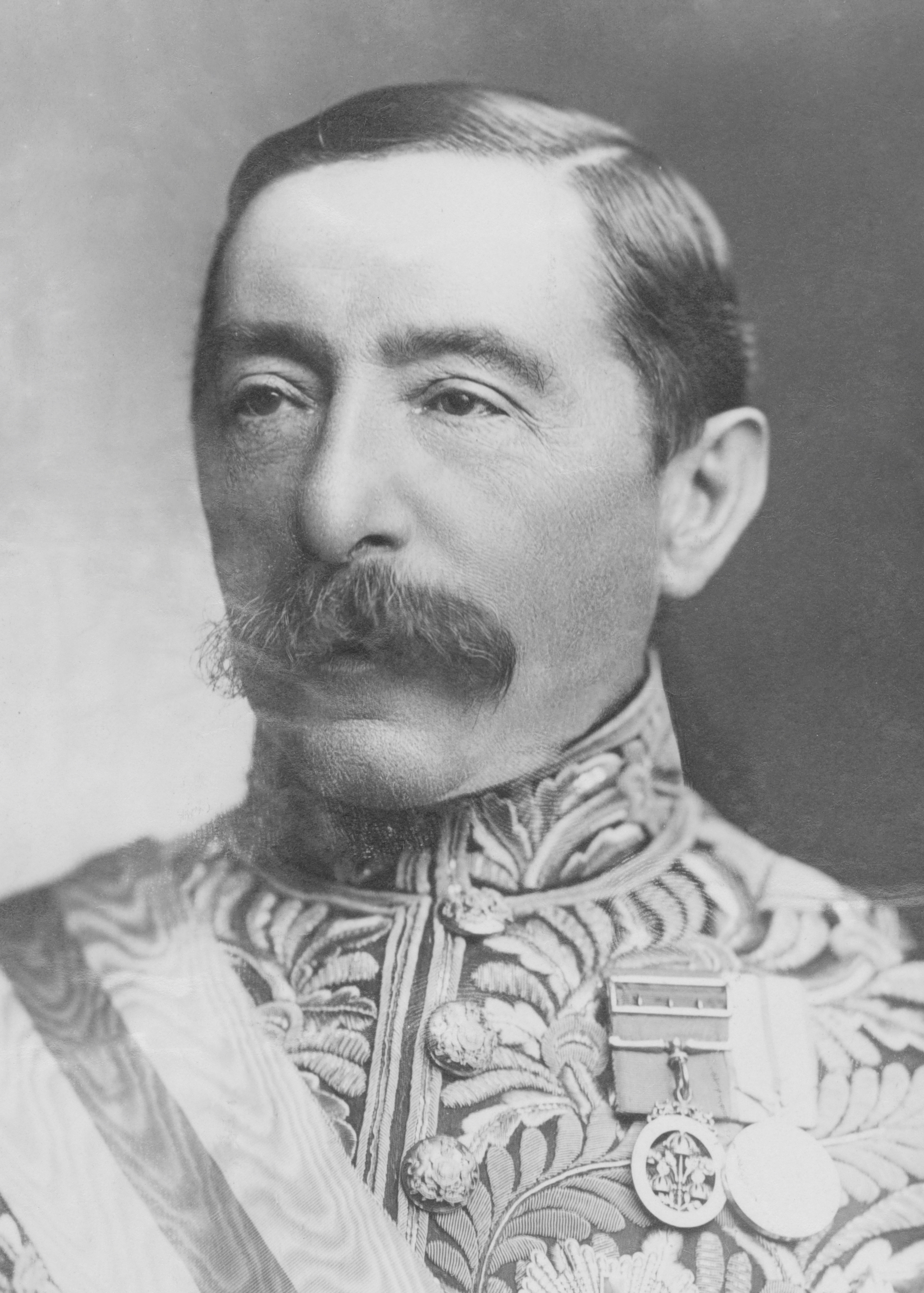
- Northcote in 1905

3rd Governor-General of Australia
- In office 21 January 1904 – 9 September 1908
- Monarch: Edward VII
- Prime Minister: Alfred Deakin; Chris Watson; George Reid
- Preceded by: Lord Tennyson
- Succeeded by: Lord Dudley

Governor of Bombay
- In office 17 February 1900 – 5 September 1903
- Monarchs: Victoria; Edward VII
- Governor General: Lord Curzon of Kedleston
- Preceded by: William Mansfield
- Succeeded by: James Monteath

Member of Parliament for Exeter
- In office 1 April 1880 – 19 December 1899 Serving with Edward Johnson (1880–1885)
- Preceded by: John George Johnson
- Succeeded by: Edgar Vincent

Personal details
- Born: 18 November 1846 London, England
- Died: 29 September 1911 (aged 64) Ashford, Kent, England
- Spouse: Alice, Lady Northcote (m. 1873)
- Education: Eton College, Merton College, Oxford

Henry Stafford Northcote, 1st Baron Northcote (18 November 1846 – 29 September 1911), was a British Conservative politician who served as the third governor-general of Australia, in office from 1904 to 1908. He was previously the governor of Bombay from 1900 to 1903, as well as a government minister under Lord Salisbury.

Northcote was the son of Stafford Northcote, 1st Earl of Iddesleigh. He was educated at Eton and Merton College, Oxford, and then worked for the Foreign Office and as private secretary to his father. Northcote was elected to the House of Commons in 1880, and served as Financial Secretary to the War Office (1885–1886) and Surveyor-General of the Ordnance (1886–1888) during Lord Salisbury's first and second terms as prime minister. Northcote was made Governor of Bombay in 1900, at which point he was raised to the peerage; he had previously been created a baronet in 1887. He became Governor-General of Australia in 1904, and brought much needed stability to the post – his two predecessors had both resigned after less than two years in office. Northcote played a relatively active role in politics, due to the unstable three-party system then in place. He served for almost five years, resigning in 1908 following a falling-out with Prime Minister Alfred Deakin.

== Background and education ==
Northcote was born in London, the second son of the prominent Conservative politician Sir Stafford Northcote, later first Earl of Iddesleigh, by his wife Cecilia Frances, daughter of Thomas Farrer and sister of Thomas Farrer, 1st Baron Farrer. He was educated at Eton and Merton College, Oxford (B.A. 1869; M.A. 1873), and then joined the Foreign Office as a diplomat.

== Diplomatic and political career ==
=== Early career ===
Northcote was secretary to the British delegation negotiating the Alabama Claims between 1871 and 1873. From 1877 to 1880 he was private secretary to his father, then Chancellor of the Exchequer. In 1880 he was elected to the House of Commons as MP for Exeter, a seat he held until 1899. He served under Lord Salisbury as Financial Secretary to the War Office between 1885 and 1886 and as Surveyor-General of the Ordnance between 1886 and 1888, when that office was abolished. He was appointed a Companion of the Order of the Bath (CB) in 1880 and created a Baronet, of Seamore Place in the Parish of St George, Hanover Square, in the County of Middlesex, in 1887. On his resignation after 20 years as MP, in January 1900 he was presented with the Freedom of the City of Exeter.

=== Governor of Bombay ===
Northcote was appointed Governor of Bombay in November 1899, through the influence of his father-in-law, Lord Mount Stephen. He visited Queen Victoria at Osborne and kissed hands upon his appointment in early January 1900, and was raised to the peerage as Baron Northcote, of the City and County of the City of Exeter, on 22 January 1900. Lord and Lady Northcote left London in late January, and arrived in Bombay the following month, where he took up the position of Governor on 17 February 1900 and was appointed a Knight Grand Commander of the Order of the Indian Empire (GCIE) on the same day.

=== Governor-General of Australia ===
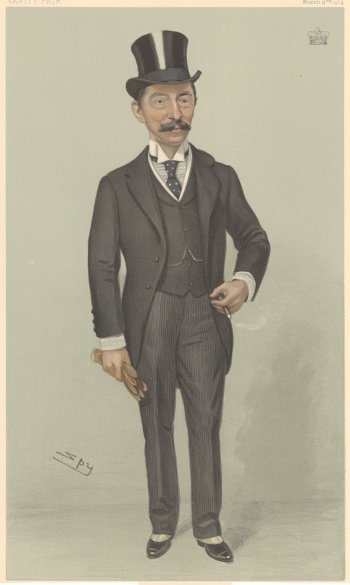
Northcote caricatured by Spy for Vanity Fair, 1904

Northcote was still Governor of Bombay when the Colonial Secretary, Joseph Chamberlain, offered him the post of Governor-General of Australia in 1903. The first two Governors-General, Lord Hopetoun and Lord Tennyson, had served shortened terms and had had difficult relations with Australian ministers. Both the British and Australian governments wanted stability and continuity, and Northcote was appointed for a five-year term. His lifelong experience in politics and his time in Bombay made him a suitable appointment. He was neither as imperious as Hopetoun nor as stuffy as Tennyson, and he made a good impression with both politicians and the public.

This was just as well, because Northcote was the first Australian Governor-General to have to deal with political instability. In doing this, he sought the advice of the Chief Justice of the newly created High Court of Australia, Sir Samuel Griffith. In April 1904 the Prime Minister, Alfred Deakin, resigned, and was succeeded in quick succession by the Labor leader Chris Watson, the Free Trade leader George Reid and then Deakin again. Both Watson and Reid asked Northcote to dissolve Parliament before their resignations, and in both cases he refused. At this time no-one doubted that the Governor-General had a discretion in these cases. It is a measure of Northcote's standing that all these leaders respected his decisions.

Like his predecessors, Northcote saw himself as a diplomatic representative of the British government as well a vice-regal representative. He was actively involved in negotiations between the British and Australian governments over contentious trade and shipping issues, although his role diminished after 1906 when the Liberal Party came to power in Britain, cutting off much of his influence in London.

In 1907 Northcote and Deakin had a falling-out when the Governor-General, on instructions from London, declined to give his royal assent to a bill restricting appeals from the Australian courts to the Privy Council in London. Deakin, although a loyal Imperialist, believed that Australian parliaments should be sovereign in Australia, and bluntly told Northcote so. This prompted Northcote to announce in February 1908 that he wished to resign, a year early. He left Australia in September. He had been made a Knight Grand Cross of the Order of St Michael and St George in 1904 and in 1909 he was sworn of the Privy Council of the United Kingdom.

== Personal life ==
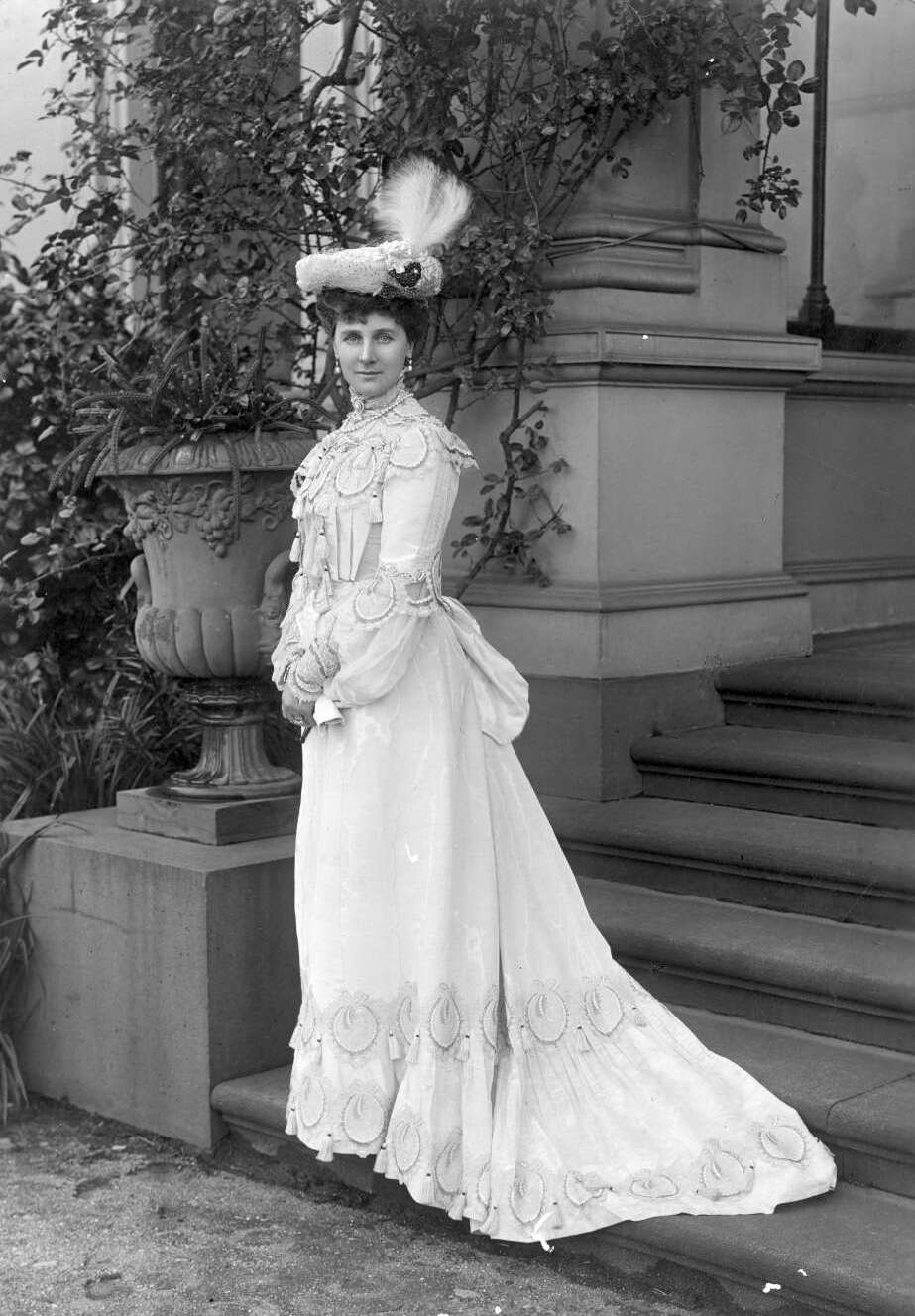
Alice, Lady Northcote

Lord Northcote married in 1873 to Alice, adopted daughter of George Stephen, 1st Baron Mount Stephen, "the richest man in Canada". There were no children from the marriage. Lady Northcote was created a Companion of the Order of the Crown of India (CI) when her husband became Governor of Bombay in 1900 and a Dame Commander of the Order of the British Empire (DBE) in 1919.

He was a Provincial Grand Master for Devon in the Masonic United Grand Lodge of England.

Northcote's health declined after his return to Britain from Australia and he died on 29 September 1911, aged 64. The barony became extinct on his death. Lady Northcote died in June 1934.

== Arms ==
Coat of arms of Henry Stafford Northcote, 1st Baron Northcote
| Crest Upon a chapeau gules, turned-up ermine, a stag trippant argent, charged on the shoulder with a crescent for difference. Escutcheon Argent, three cross-crosslets in bend sable, a crescent for difference. Supporters Two stags proper, pendant from the neck of each by a gold chain an escutcheon ermine, thereon a pine cone or, and charged on the shoulder with a crescent for difference. Motto Christi crux est mea lux (The cross of Christ is my light) |

== Sources ==
- Serle, Percival (1949). "Northcote, Henry Stafford". Dictionary of Australian Biography. Sydney: Angus & Robertson.
- Donald Markwell. "Griffith, Barton and the early governor-generals: aspects of Australia's constitutional development", Public Law Review, 1999.

Parliament of the United Kingdom
| Preceded by Arthur Mills; John George Johnson | Member of Parliament for Exeter; 1880–1899; With: Edward Johnson (1880–1885) (representation reduced to one member 1885) | Succeeded by Edgar Vincent |
Party political offices
| Preceded by Charles Stuart-Wortley | Chairman of the National Union of Conservative Constitutional Associations; 1893 | Succeeded by James Rankin |
Political offices
| Preceded by Sir Arthur Hayter, Bt | Financial Secretary to the War Office; 1885–1886 | Succeeded by Herbert Gladstone |
Military offices
| Preceded by William Woodall | Surveyor-General of the Ordnance; 1886–1887 | Post abolished |
Government offices
| Preceded by The Viscount Sandhurst | Governor of Bombay; 1900–1903 | Succeeded by The Lord Lamington |
| Preceded by The Lord Tennyson | Governor-General of Australia; 1904–1908 | Succeeded by The Earl of Dudley |
Peerage of the United Kingdom
| New creation | Baron Northcote; 1899–1911 | Extinct |
Baronetage of the United Kingdom
| New creation | Baronet of Seamore Place; 1887–1911 | Extinct |
| Preceded by Hudson-Kinahan baronets | Northcote baronets of Seamore Place; 23 November 1887 | Succeeded by Collet baronets |
