= George Warde Norman =

English director of the Bank of England (1793-1882)

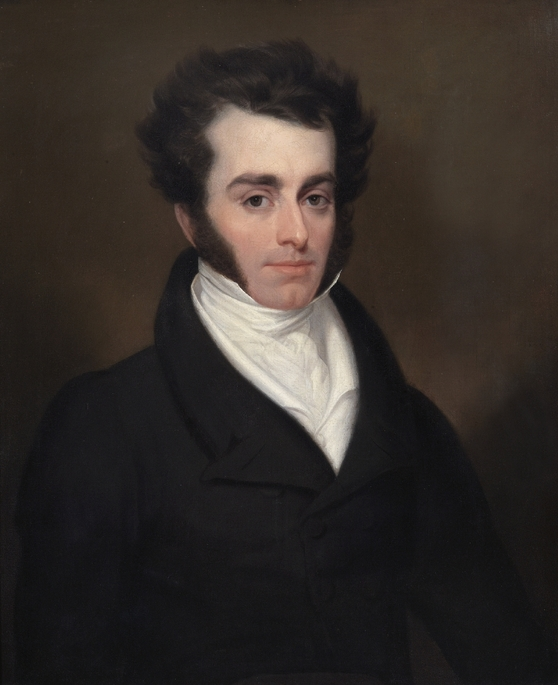
George Warde Norman, painted by Francis William Wilkin

George Warde Norman (1793–1882) was an English director of the Bank of England, known as a writer on finance.

== Early life ==
He was born at Bromley Common, Kent, on 20 September 1793, the son of George Norman, a merchant in the Norway timber trade, and Charlotte, third daughter of Edward Beadon, rector of North Stoneham, Hampshire. He was educated at Eton College from 1805 to 1810, and then was in business with his father, spending time in 1819 to 1821 in Norway. His father retired in 1824, and he remained in the timber trade till 1830, when he transferred it to Sewell & Co., his brother Richard Norman becoming a partner in the new firm.

== Financial interests ==
From 1821 to 1872 Norman was a director of the Bank of England, and in 1826 played a role in the establishment of its branch offices. About 1840 he was appointed a member of the committee of the treasury at the bank. During the commercial crisis of 1847 he spent much of his time at the bank, and conferred daily with Sir Charles Wood, Chancellor of the Exchequer, in Downing Street. In 1832 he was examined before Lord Althorp's committee of the House of Commons inquiry into currency, and in 1840 he gave evidence for six days before Sir Charles Wood's committee on matters connected with circulation. In 1848 he was examined before a committee of the House of Lords on currency matters.

Norman became an exchequer bill commissioner in 1831; was renominated a commissioner in 1842, when the business was transferred to the public works loan commissioners, and served till 1876. He was also a director of the Sun Insurance Office from 1830 to 1864.

== Other interests ==
Norman was for many years a governor of Guy's Hospital, and the last surviving original member of the Political Economy Club, founded in 1821. In politics he was a liberal, and an advocate of free trade; in 1835 he was asked to stand for election to Parliament for the City of London, and later to contest West Kent, but declined. He took an interest in matters connected with the Poor Law administration.

Norman was also a cricketer who played as an amateur between 1827 and 1838. He probably played at school and made his debut in 1832. He appeared in nine matches, three for Kent and six for the Gentlemen of Kent. He scored a total of 81 runs with a highest score of 37 not out. He was one of the founders of Prince's Plain Club which played on Bromley Common and retained his association with the club after it moved to Chislehurst and became the West Kent Cricket Club, serving as the club's president from 1832 until his death in 1882 and authoring a history of the club. Norman's brother, Henry Norman also played for Kent and the Gentlemen of Kent, as did his son Frederick Norman. Another son, Philip Norman played a single match for the Gentlemen of Kent and other members of his family played, including a grandson, Maurice Bonham-Carter, who played a single match for Kent in the early 20th century.

== Personal ==
Soon after leaving Eton, Norman formed a close friendship with George Grote the historian. In 1814 Norman introduced Grote to Harriet Lewin, who later became Grote's wife; and it was at Norman's suggestion that Grote undertook to write the history of Greece rather than that of Rome, which he had originally intended. They had also a common interest in the development of cricket in West Kent.

== Death ==
Norman died at Bromley Common, Kent, on 4 September 1882, within a few days of completing his eighty-ninth year.

== Works ==
In 1833 Norman published for private use and circulation Remarks upon some prevalent Errors with respect to Currency and Banking, and Suggestions to the Legislature as to the Renewal of the Bank Charter. An influential pamphlet, it was criticised by Samuel Jones Loyd, John Horsley Palmer, and Robert Torrens, and was republished under somewhat new name in 1838. His other major work, was An Examination of some prevailing Opinions as to the Pressure of Taxation in this and other Countries (1850, 4th edition, 1864), in which he combated the view that the increase of public expenditure was a proof of heavier taxation. Other works were:

- Letter to Charles Wood, esq., M.P., on Money, and the Means of economising the Use of it, 1841.
- Remarks on the Incidence of Import Duties, with special reference to the England and Cuba Case contained in "The Budget", 1860.
- Papers on various subjects, 1869.
- The Future of the United States, a paper read before the British Association at Belfast in August 1874; printed in the Journal of the Statistical Society, March 1875.
- A Memoir of the Rev. F. Beadon, 1879.

He also contributed to The Economist.

== Family ==
Norman married in 1830 Sibella (1808–1887), daughter of Henry Stone, of the Bengal civil service, and then a partner in the banking firm of Stone & Martin. Their sons included Frederick Norman and Philip Norman. The elder daughter Sibella Charlotte married the barrister Henry Bonham Carter.

== Bibliography ==
- Carlaw, Derek (2020). Kent County Cricketers, A to Z: Part One (1806–1914) (PDF). Cardiff: ACS.

Attribution

This article incorporates text from a publication now in the public domain: Lee, Sidney, ed. (1895). "Norman, George Warde". Dictionary of National Biography. Vol. 41. London: Smith, Elder & Co.
