= Frederick Norman =

English merchant banker and cricketer

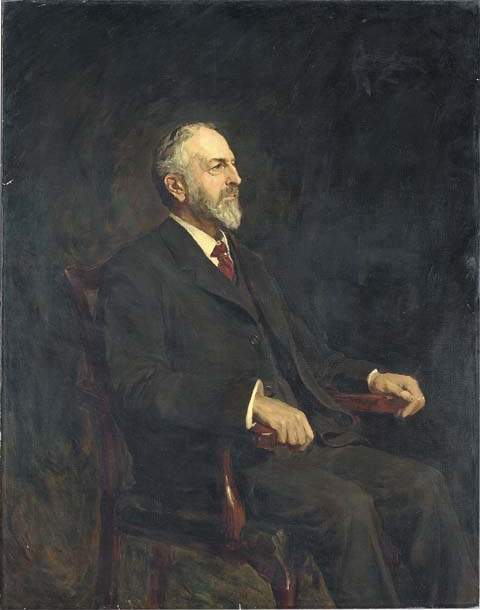
Frederick Henry Norman, painting after Sir Hubert von Herkomer

Frederick Henry Norman (23 January 1839 – 6 October 1916) was an English merchant banker and a director of the merchant bank Brown, Shipley & Co. He was also a first-class cricketer, appearing for Kent, Cambridge University, Cambridge Town Club (aka Cambridgeshire) and some amateur teams. He was born at Bromley Common, Kent and died in Mayfair, London.

The Norman family have a long history in English banking. Frederick was the fourth son of George Warde Norman (1793–1882), a director of the Bank of England from 1821 to 1872. His older brother Charles, also a first-class cricketer, became a merchant banker too with Baring Brothers. He was appointed High Sheriff of Hertfordshire for 1899.

== Cricket career ==
Norman was educated at Eton College and at Trinity College, Cambridge. He played in the Eton v Harrow cricket matches in four seasons from 1854 to 1857 as a right-handed middle-order batsman. At Cambridge University in 1858 he went straight into the first team for cricket and in his first first-class match, against the Cambridge Town Club, he made 100, putting on 160 for the fourth wicket with William Benthall who made 103 and was also making his first-class cricket debut. He retained his place for the season, and was picked for the University Match against Oxford University; in this game, he top-scored for Cambridge with 43 in the first innings but, in the second innings, the whole team was dismissed for just 39. At the end of the university cricket season, Norman was picked for the 1858 Gentlemen v Players match at Lord's, which the Players team won decisively. Right at the end of the season, he played a single game for Kent which Sussex, largely through the bowling of John Wisden and Jemmy Dean, also won easily. In neither of these games did he reach double figures.

Norman retained his place in the Cambridge first team through 1859 and 1860 and was captain in the second of these years, leading his team to victory in the 1860 University Match, which was a very low-scoring game. He also appeared in intermittent matches for Kent through to 1864. His second century and highest first-class score was an innings of 103 for the Gentlemen of Kent team against the Gentlemen of England in 1859. His final first-class game was in 1866, but he played for I Zingari into the 1870s.

== Marriage and family ==
He married Lina Susan Penelope Collet (1850–1950), a daughter of Sir Mark Wilks Collet, 1st Baronet, of St. Clere, Ightham, Sevenoaks, on 15 November 1870. Their children were:

- Sir Montagu Norman, 1st Baron Norman (6 September 1871 – 4 February 1950), a long serving Governor of the Bank of England and
- Ronald Collet Norman (15 November 1873 – 5 December 1963), who chaired the BBC and the London County Council.

== Bibliography ==
- Carlaw, Derek (2020). Kent County Cricketers, A to Z: Part One (1806–1914) (PDF). Cardiff: ACS.
