= Ronald Collet Norman =

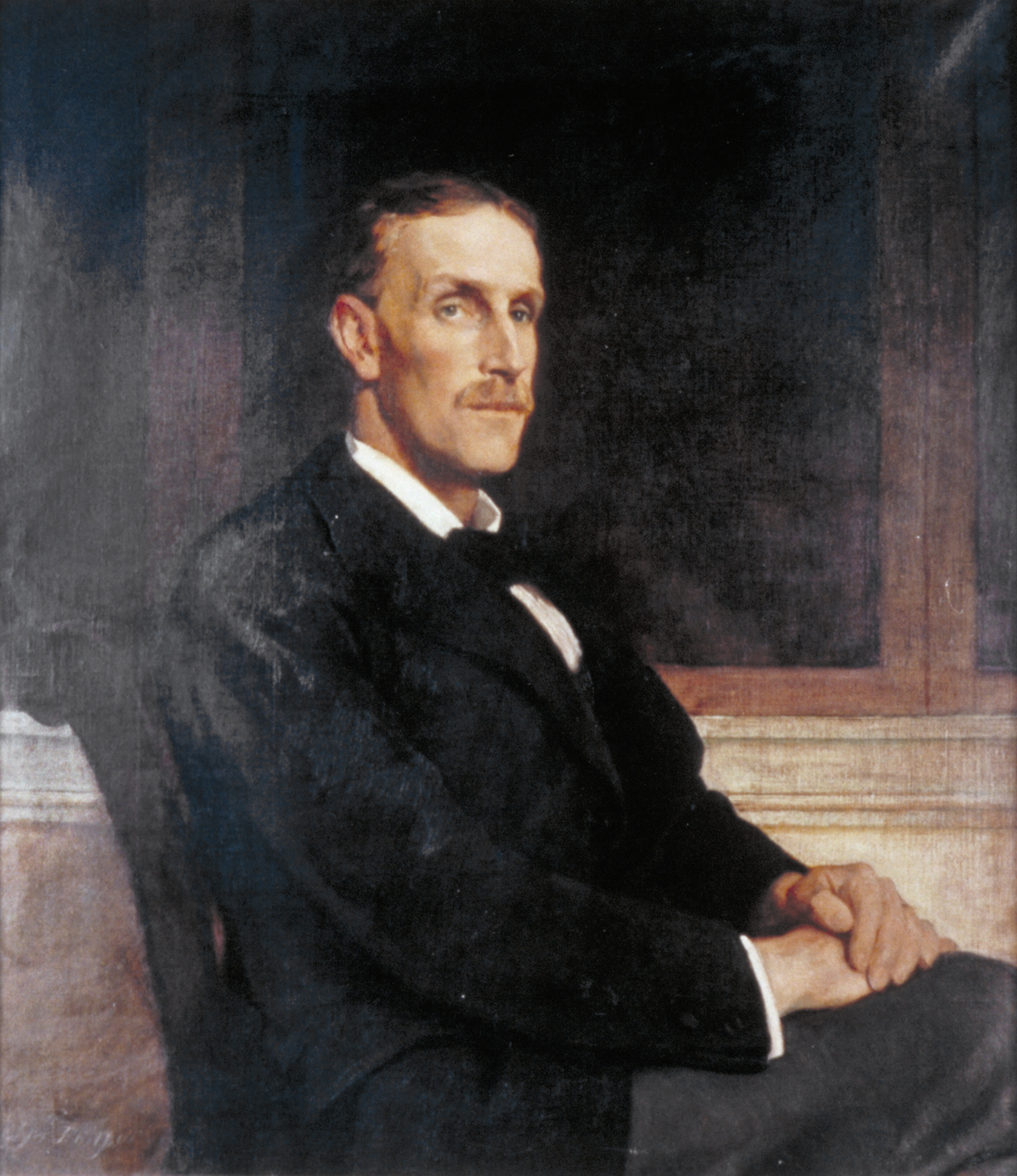
Ronald Collet Norman (1873–1963), Chairman of the BBC; City of London Corporation; by Glyn Philpot

Ronald Collet Norman JP (15 November 1873 – 5 December 1963) was a banker, administrator and politician. He was chairman of the Board of Governors of the BBC from 1935 to 1939 and of the London County Council from 1918 to 1919.

== Biography ==
Norman was the son of Frederick Norman of the Norman family, long prominent in banking. He was educated at Trinity College, Cambridge (MA 1901).

In March 1900, he was appointed an assistant private secretary (unpaid) to the (Conservative) Under-Secretary of State for War, George Wyndham.

In 1907 he was elected to the London County Council as a Municipal Reformer. From 1918 to 1919 he served as chairman and was an alderman of the council from 1922 to 1934. He served as the vice-chairman of the National Trust during the 1930s, but he declined the chairmanship, because he was not "a great landowner". He placed the Trust's finance committee on a more professional footing; it subsequently fell to his son Mark Norman to chair that committee through the difficult economic circumstances of the 1970s. From 1933 to 1935 he served as vice-chairman of the BBC, and was chairman from 1935 to April, 1939.

== Descendants ==
Norman married Lady Florence Sibell Bridgeman (1877–1959), a daughter of the 4th Earl of Bradford. They had three sons and one daughter:

1. Brigadier Hugh Norman (1905–1979); father of
  1. Patricia Norman (b. 27 May 1940), former wife of Henry Colum Crichton-Stuart and now wife of the 3rd Baron Kindersley;
2. Mark Norman (1910–1994), a successful merchant banker;
  1. David Norman
    1. Isabella Julia Norman is married to Timothy Nicholas Sean Knatchbull, a descendant of Queen Victoria through her great-grandson Louis Mountbatten, 1st Earl Mountbatten of Burma.
3. Sibyl Margaret Norman (1908–2010) who married 1stly Archibald Edward Cubitt (16 January 1901 – 13 Feb 1972); they had issue, 1 son and 1 surviving daughter.
  1. (Mark) Robin Cubitt (13 June 1936 – 1991), who was father of three sons, including
    1. Mark Edward Cubitt, 5th Baron Ashcombe (b. 29 February 1964)
  2. Priscilla Cubitt (b. 30 May 1941) is the third wife of the 11th Earl of Harrington, and they are parents of
    1. Lady Isabella Stanhope, wife of the 7th Earl Cawdor.
4. Richard Norman (1917–1994) who married an Anglo-Spanish aristocrat, descended from the Bourbon duques de Marchena (Dukes of Marchena) themselves descended morganatically from Spanish kings.

== Family connections ==
Through the Bridgemans, the Normans descended from Ronald Collet Norman and Lady Florence are thus related to several prominent English and Scottish aristocrats including the Duke of Gloucester (whose maternal grandmother was a sister of Lady Florence Norman), the 7th Marquess of Salisbury (whose maternal great-grandmother was another sister), the 9th Duke of Buccleuch (whose paternal grandmother, shared with the Duke of Gloucester, was a sister of Lady Florence), and so forth.

His brother Montagu Norman, became a long-serving governor of the Bank of England and was elevated to the peerage as the 1st Baron Norman (but that title is now extinct, Lord Norman having had no issue). Both their grandfathers were directors.

== Sources ==
- Lundy, Darryl. "Ronald Collet Norman". The Peerage. is shown for his marriage and some of his descendants.
- Lundy, Darryl. "Lady Florence Sibell Bridgeman". The Peerage. was the wife of Ronald Collet Norman, and the mother of all his children.
- Lundy, Darryl. "Richard Norman". The Peerage. was the youngest son.
- Lundy, Darryl. "Patricia Norman's marriage". The Peerage. shows one of Ronald Collet Norman's granddaughters, formerly wife of the 3rd Baron Kindersley.
- Lundy, Darryl. "Lady Isabella Rachel Stanhope". The Peerage. is Ronald Collet Norman's great-granddaughter and now The Countess Cawdor.

Political offices
Preceded by Marquess of Crewe	Chairman of the London County Council; 1918–1919	Succeeded by Lord Downham
Preceded by Hayes Fisher	Chairman of the Finance Committee of London County Council; 1911–1915	Succeeded by George Goldie
Media offices
Preceded by William Bridgeman	Chairman of the BBC Board of Governors; 1935-1939	Succeeded by Sir Allan Powell
