= List of Conservative Party MPs (UK) =

This is a list of Conservative Party MPs. It includes all members of Parliament elected to the House of Commons of the United Kingdom representing the Conservative Party from 1834 onwards. Members of the Scottish Parliament, the Senedd or the European Parliament are not listed. The provided period of a member's tenure as a constituency MP is only relevant to those times that member was also party to the Conservative whip. Those in italics are overall leaders of the Conservative Party, those in bold are prime ministers.

== List of MPs ==
=== A ===
- Benjamin St John Ackers; MP for West Gloucestershire (1885)
- James Ackers; MP for Ludlow (1841–1847)
- Sir Thomas Dyke Acland, 10th Baronet; MP for North Devon (1837–1857)
- Sir Thomas Dyke Acland, 11th Baronet; MP for West Somerset (1837–1847)
- Sir Gilbert Acland-Troyte; MP for Tiverton (1924–1945)
- William à Court-Holmes; MP for Isle of Wight (1837–1847)
- William Acton; MP for County Wicklow (1841–1848)
- William Augustus Adam; MP for Woolwich (1910)
- Nigel Adams; MP for Selby and Ainsty (2010–2023)
- Vyvyan Adams; MP for Leeds West (1931–1945)
- Charles Adderley; MP for Staffordshire North (1841–1878)
- William Addington; MP for Devizes (1863–1864)
- John Addison; MP for Ashton under Lyne (1885–1895)
- Robert Adley; MP for Bristol North East (1970–1974), Christchurch and Lymington (1974–1983) and Christchurch (1983–1993)
- Bim Afolami; MP for Hitchin and Harpenden (2017–2024)
- Adam Afriyie; MP for Windsor (2005–2024)
- Sir James Agg-Gardner; MP for Cheltenham (1874–1880; 1885–1895; 1900–1906; 1911–1928)
- Sir Peter Agnew, 1st Baronet; MP for Camborne (1931–1950) and South Worcestershire (1955–1966)
- Imran Ahmad Khan; MP for Wakefield (2019–2022)
- Nickie Aiken; MP for Cities of London and Westminster (2019–2024)
- Peter Ainsworth; MP for East Surrey (1992–2010)
- Sir John Aird, 1st Baronet; MP for Paddington North (1887–1906)
- Jonathan Aitken; MP for Thanet East (1974–1983) and South Thanet (1983–1997)
- Max Aitken; MP for Ashton under Lyne (1910–1916)
- Sir Max Aitken; MP for Holborn (1945–1950)
- Sir William Aitken; MP for Bury St Edmunds (1950–1964)
- Aretas Akers-Douglas; MP for East Kent (1880–1885) and St Augustine's (1885–1911)
- Sir Irving Albery; MP for Gravesend (1924–1945)
- Peter Aldous; MP for Waveney (2010–2024)
- John Aldridge; MP for Horsham (1868–1869)
- Sir Claud Alexander; MP for Ayrshire South (1874–1885)
- James Alexander, 2nd Viscount Alexander; MP for County Tyrone (1837–1839)
- Richard Alexander; MP for Newark (1979–1997)
- Michael Alison; MP for Barkston Ash (1964–1983) and Selby (1983–1997)
- Lucy Allan; MP for Telford (2015–2024)
- Robert Allan; MP for Paddington South (1951–1966)
- James Allason; MP for Hemel Hempstead (1959–1974)
- Rupert Allason; MP for Torbay (1987–1997)
- John Derby Allcroft; MP for Worcester (1878–1880)
- Heidi Allen; MP for South Cambridgeshire (2015–2019)
- John Sandeman Allen; MP for Liverpool West Derby (1924–1935)
- John Sandeman Allen; MP for Birkenhead West (1931–1945)
- Augustus Henry Eden Allhusen; MP for Salisbury (1897–1900) and Hackney Central (1900–1906)
- Alfred Percy Allsopp; MP for Taunton (1887–1895)
- George Allsopp; MP for Worcester (1885–1906)
- Sir Henry Allsopp; MP for East Worcestershire (1874–1880)
- Samuel Allsopp; MP for East Staffordshire (1873–1880) and Taunton (1882–1887)
- Cuthbert Alport; MP for Colchester (1950–1961)
- Richard Alsager; MP for East Surrey (1835–1841)
- Julian Amery; MP for Preston North (1950–1966) and Brighton Pavilion (1969–1992)
- Leo Amery; MP for Birmingham South (1911–1918) and Birmingham Sparkbrook (1918–1945)
- Sir David Amess; MP for Basildon (1983–1997) and Southend West (1997–2021)
- Alan Amos; MP for Hexham (1987–1992)
- Michael Ancram; MP for Berwick and East Lothian (Feb 1974–Sep 1974), Edinburgh South (1979–1987) and Devizes (1992–2010)
- Sir Alan Anderson; MP for City of London (1935–1940)
- David Anderson; MP for Dumfriesshire (1963–1964)
- Lee Anderson; MP for Ashfield (2019–2024)
- Stuart Anderson; MP for Wolverhampton South West (2019–2024) and South Shropshire (2024–present)
- Stuart Andrew; MP for Pudsey (2010–2024) and Daventry (2024–present)
- Arthur Annesley, 11th Viscount Valentia; MP for Oxford (1895–1917)
- Hugh Annesley; MP for County Cavan (1857–1874)
- Caroline Ansell; MP for Eastbourne (2015–2017; 2019–2024)
- William Anstruther-Gray; MP for St Andrews Burghs (1906–1910; 1910–1918)
- William Anstruther-Gray; MP for North Lanarkshire (1931–1945) and Berwick and East Lothian (1951–1966)
- Sir Edmund Antrobus, 3rd Baronet; MP for East Surrey (1841–1847)
- Gerald Arbuthnot; MP for Burnley (1910)
- Sir Hugh Arbuthnot; MP for Kincardineshire (1834–1865)
- James Arbuthnot; MP for Wanstead and Woodford (1987–1997) and North East Hampshire (1997–2015)
- Sir John Arbuthnot, 1st Baronet; MP for Dover (1950–1964)
- Sir Edward Archdale, 1st Baronet; MP for North Fermanagh (1898–1903; 1916–1922)
- Mervyn Edward Archdale; MP for County Fermanagh (1834–1874)
- William Humphrys Archdale; MP for County Fermanagh (1874–1885)
- Jeffrey Archer; MP for Louth, Lincolnshire (1969–1974)
- Martin Archer-Shee; MP for Finsbury Central (1910–1918) and Finsbury (1918–1923)
- Edward Argar; MP for Charnwood (2015–2024) and Melton and Syston (2024–present)
- Francis Arkwright; MP for East Derbyshire (1874–1880)
- Alfred Arnold; MP for Halifax (1895–1900)
- Jacques Arnold; MP for Gravesham (1987–1997)
- Sir Tom Arnold; MP for Hazel Grove (1974–1997)
- Hugh Oakeley Arnold-Forster; MP for Belfast West (1892–1906) and Croydon (1906–1909)
- David Ashby; MP for North West Leicestershire (1983–1997)
- Wilfrid Ashley; MP for Blackpool (1906–1918), Fylde (1918–1922) and New Forest and Christchurch (1922–1932)
- Sir Ellis Ashmead-Bartlett; MP for Eye (1880–1885) and Sheffield Ecclesall (1885–1902)
- Ellis Ashmead-Bartlett; MP for Hammersmith North (1924–1926)
- Sir Hubert Ashton; MP for Chelmsford (1950–1964)
- John Aspinall; MP for Clitheroe (1853)
- Jack Aspinwall; MP for Kingswood (1979–1983) and Wansdyke (1983–1997)
- Ralph Assheton; MP for Clitheroe (1868–1880)
- Ralph Assheton; MP for Rushcliffe (1934–1945), City of London (1945–1950) and Blackburn West (1950–1955)
- John Harvey Astell; MP for Cambridge (1852–1853) and Ashburton (1859–1865)
- Sir John Dugdale Astley, 3rd Baronet; MP for North Lincolnshire (1874–1880)
- John Jacob Astor; MP for Dover (1922–1945)
- Sir John Astor; MP for Plymouth Sutton (1951–1959)
- Sir John Astor; MP for Plymouth Sutton (1951–1959)
- John Astor; MP for Newbury (1964–1974)
- Michael Astor; MP for East Surrey (1945–1951)
- Nancy Astor; MP for Plymouth Sutton (1919–1945)
- Waldorf Astor; MP for Plymouth (1910–1918) and Plymouth Sutton (1918–1919)
- William Astor; MP for Fulham East (1935–1945) and Wycombe (1951–1952)
- Sarah Atherton; MP for Wrexham (2019–2024)
- Albert Atkey; MP for Nottingham Central (1918–1922)
- Humphrey Atkins; MP for Merton and Morden (1955–1970) and Spelthorne (1970–1987)
- Sir Robert Atkins; MP for Preston North (1979–1983) and South Ribble (1983–1997)
- Victoria Atkins; MP for Louth and Horncastle (2015–present)
- Sir Cyril Atkinson; MP for Altrincham (1924–1933)
- David Atkinson; MP for Bournemouth East (1977–2005)
- Peter Atkinson; MP for Hexham (1992–2010)
- John Attwood; MP for Harwich (1841–1847)
- Matthias Attwood; MP for Whitehaven (1834–1837)
- Matthias Wolverley Attwood; MP for Greenwich (1837–1841)
- Sir Henry Aubrey-Fletcher, 4th Baronet; MP for Horsham (1880–1885) and Lewes (1885–1910)
- Thomas Austen; MP for West Kent (1845–1847)
- Sir Herbert Austin; MP for Birmingham King's Norton (1918–1924)
- Daniel Awdry; MP for Chippenham (1962–1979)

=== B ===
- Gareth Bacon; MP for Orpington (2019–present)
- Richard Bacon; MP for South Norfolk (2001–2024)
- Kemi Badenoch; MP for Saffron Walden (2017–2024) and North West Essex (2024–present)
- Sir George Baden-Powell; MP for Liverpool Kirkdale (1885–1898)
- Sir Richard Baggallay; MP for Hereford (1865–1868) and Mid Surrey (1870–1875)
- Sir William Bagge, 1st Baronet; MP for West Norfolk (1837–1857; 1865–1880)
- Eric Bailey; MP for Manchester Gorton (1931–1935)
- Shaun Bailey; MP for West Bromwich West (2019–2024)
- Henry Baillie; MP for Inverness-shire (1840–1868)
- Siobhan Baillie; MP for Stroud (2019–2024)
- Alexander Baillie-Cochrane; MP for Bridport (1841–1846), Lanarkshire (1857), Honiton (1859–1868) and Isle of Wight (1870–1880)
- James Baird; MP for Falkirk Burghs (1851–1857)
- Sir John Baird, 2nd Baronet; MP for Rugby (1910–1922) and Ayr Burghs (1922–1925)
- William Baird; MP for Falkirk Burghs (1841–1846)
- Duncan Baker; MP for North Norfolk (2019–2024)
- Kenneth Baker; MP for Acton (1968–1970), St Marylebone (1970–1983) and Mole Valley (1983–1997)
- Sir Nicholas Baker; MP for North Dorset (1979–1997)
- Peter Baker; MP for South Norfolk (1950–1954)
- Steve Baker; MP for Wycombe (2010–2024)
- Wilfred Baker; MP for Banffshire (1964–1974)
- John Baldock; MP for Harborough (1950–1959)
- Sir Tony Baldry; MP for Banbury (1983–2015)
- Alfred Baldwin; MP for Bewdley (1892–1908)
- Sir Archer Baldwin; MP for Leominster (1945–1959)
- Harriett Baldwin; MP for West Worcestershire (2010–present)
- **Sir Stanley Baldwin**; MP for Bewdley (1908–1937)
- **Sir Arthur Balfour**; MP for Hertford (1874–1885), Manchester East (1885–1906) and City of London (1906–1922)
- Gerald Balfour; MP for Leeds Central (1885–1906)
- Harold Balfour; MP for Isle of Thanet (1929–1945)
- James Maitland Balfour; MP for Haddington Burghs (1841–1847)
- Kenneth Balfour; MP for Christchurch (1900–1906)
- John Thomas Ball; MP for Dublin University (1868–1875)
- Sir Frederick Banbury, 1st Baronet; MP for Peckham (1892–1906) and City of London (1906–1924)
- Cyril Banks; MP for Pudsey (1950–1959)
- Robert Banks; MP for Harrogate (1974–1997)
- Anthony Barber; MP for Doncaster (1951–1964) and Altrincham and Sale (1965–1974)
- Steve Barclay; MP for North East Cambridgeshire (2010–present)
- Sir Malcolm Barclay-Harvey; MP for Kincardine and Aberdeenshire West (1923–1929; 1931–1939)
- Guy Baring; MP for Winchester (1906–1916)
- Henry Bingham Baring; MP for Marlborough (1834–1847)
- Thomas Charles Baring; MP for Essex South (1874–1885) and City of London (1887–1891)
- Greg Barker; MP for Bexhill and Battle (2001–2015)
- Sir John Barlow, 2nd Baronet; MP for Middleton and Prestwich (1951–1966)
- John Barneby; MP for Droitwich (1835–1837) and East Worcestershire (1837–1846)
- John Baron; MP for Billericay (2001–2010) and Basildon and Billericay (2010–2024)
- Sir Edmund Bartley-Denniss; MP for Oldham (1911–1922)
- Basil Barton; MP for Kingston upon Hull Central (1931–1935)
- Sir Walter Barttelot, 1st Baronet; MP for West Sussex (1860–1885) and Horsham (1885–1893)
- Gavin Barwell; MP for Croydon Central (2010–2017)
- Michael Bates; MP for Langbaurgh (1992–1997)
- Sir Thomas Bateson, 2nd Baronet; MP for Londonderry (1844–1857) and Devizes (1864–1885)
- Allen Bathurst, Lord Apsley; MP for Southampton (1922–1929) and Bristol Central (1931–1942)
- Violet Bathurst, Lady Apsley; MP for Bristol Central (1943–1945)
- Benjamin Bathurst; MP for Cirencester (1895–1906; 1910–1918)
- Spencer Batiste; MP for Elmet (1983–1997)
- Sir Brian Batsford; MP for Ealing South (1958–1974)
- Arthur Anthony Baumann; MP for Peckham (1885–1892)
- Sir Arthur Beverley Baxter; MP for Wood Green (1935–1950) and Southgate (1950–1964)
- Simon Baynes; MP for Clwyd South (2019–2024)
- Bramston Beach; MP for North Hampshire (1857–1885) and Andover (1885–1901)
- Tufton Beamish; MP for Lewes (1924–1931; 1936–1945)
- Sir Tufton Beamish; MP for Lewes (1945–1974)
- David Beatty, 2nd Viscount Borodale; MP for Peckham (1931–1936)
- Ralph Beaumont; MP for Portsmouth Central (1931–1945)
- Sir Anthony Beaumont-Dark; MP for Birmingham Selly Oak (1979–1992)
- Guto Bebb; MP for Aberconwy (2010–2019)
- Sir Edmund Beckett, 4th Baronet; MP for West Riding of Yorkshire (1841–1847; 1848–1859)
- Ernest Beckett; MP for Whitby (1885–1905)
- Sir Gervase Beckett, 1st Baronet; MP for Whitby (1906–1918), Scarborough and Whitby (1918–1922) and Leeds North (1923–1929)
- Peter Bedford; MP for Mid Leicestershire (2024–present)
- Sir Alfred Beit, 2nd Baronet; MP for St Pancras South East (1931–1945)
- Aaron Bell; MP for Newcastle-under-Lyme (2019–2024)
- Charles Bell; MP for City of London (1868–1869)
- Philip Bell; MP for Bolton East (1951–1960)
- Sir Ronald Bell; MP for South Buckinghamshire (1950–1974) and Beaconsfield (1974–1982)
- Carlyon Bellairs; MP for King's Lynn (1906–1910) and Maidstone (1915–1931)
- Sir Henry Bellingham; MP for North West Norfolk (1983–1997; 2001–2019)
- Sir Henry Howe Bemrose; MP for Derby (1895–1900)
- Vivian Bendall; MP for Ilford North (1978–1997)
- Sir Arthur Benn, 1st Baronet; MP for Plymouth (1910–1918), Plymouth Drake (1918–1929) and Sheffield Park (1931–1935)
- Sir Ion Hamilton Benn, 1st Baronet; MP for Greenwich (1910–1922)
- Sir Albert Bennett, 1st Baronet; MP for Nottingham Central (1924–1930)
- Sir Frederic Bennett; MP for Reading North (1951–1955), Torquay (1955–1974) and Torbay (1974–1987)
- Nicholas Bennett; MP for Pembrokeshire (1987–1992)
- Sir Peter Bennett; MP for Birmingham Edgbaston (1940–1953)
- Sir Reginald Bennett; MP for Gosport & Fareham (1950–1974) and Fareham (1974–1979)
- Lord George Bentinck; MP for King's Lynn (1834–1848)
- Scott Benton; MP for Blackpool South (2019–2024)
- Richard Benyon; MP for Newbury (2005–2019; 2019)
- Thomas Benyon; MP for Abingdon (1979–1983)
- Sir Bill Benyon; MP for Buckingham (1970–1983) and Milton Keynes (1983–1992)
- John Bercow; MP for Buckingham (1997–2009)
- Lord Charles Beresford; MP for County Waterford (1874–1880), Marylebone East (1885–1889), York (1898–1900), Woolwich (1902–1903) and Portsmouth (1910–1916)
- George Beresford; MP for Athlone (1841–1842)
- Sir John Beresford, 1st Baronet; MP for Chatham (1835–1837)
- Sir Paul Beresford; MP for Croydon Central (1992–1997) and Mole Valley (1997–2024)
- William Beresford; MP for Harwich (1841–1847) and North Essex (1847–1865)
- Humphry Berkeley; MP for Lancaster (1959–1966)
- Francis Bernard, 3rd Viscount Bernard; MP for Bandon (1842–1856)
- Henry Boyle Bernard; MP for Bandon (1863–1868)
- Percy Bernard; MP for Bandon (1880)
- William Smyth Bernard; MP for Bandon (1834–1835; 1857–1863)
- Sir Anthony Berry; MP for Southgate (1964–1983) and Enfield Southgate (1983–1984)
- Jake Berry; MP for Rossendale and Darwen (2010–2024)
- James Berry; MP for Kingston and Surbiton (2015–2017)
- Lionel Berry; MP for Buckingham (1943–1945)
- Keith Best; MP for Anglesey (1979–1983) and Ynys Môn (1983–1987)
- Albert Bethel; MP for Eccles (1924–1929)
- Sir Henry Betterton, 1st Baronet; MP for Rushcliffe (1918–1934)
- David Bevan; MP for Birmingham Yardley (1979–1992)
- Reginald Bevins; MP for Liverpool Toxteth (1950–1964)
- Saqib Bhatti; MP for Meriden (2019–2024) and Meriden and Solihull East (2024–present)
- Sir Mancherjee Bhownaggree; MP for Bethnal Green North East (1895–1906)
- John Bidgood; MP for Bury and Radcliffe (1955–1964)
- John Biffen; MP for Oswestry (1961–1983) and North Shropshire (1983–1997)
- Sir John Biggs-Davison; MP for Chigwell (1955–1974) and Epping Forest (1974–1988)
- James Bigwood; MP for Finsbury East (1885–1886) and Brentford (1886–1906)
- Charles Bill; MP for Leek (1892–1906)
- Andrew Bingham; MP for High Peak (2010–2017)
- George Bingham, 5th Earl of Lucan; MP for Chertsey (1904–1906)
- Richard Bingham; MP for Liverpool Garston (1957–1966)
- Brian Binley; MP for Northampton South (2005–2015)
- Sir Alfred Bird, 1st Baronet; MP for Wolverhampton West (1910–1922)
- Sir Robert Bird, 2nd Baronet; MP for Wolverhampton West (1922–1929; 1931–1945)
- Sir Edward Birkbeck, 1st Baronet; MP for North Norfolk (1879–1885) and East Norfolk (1885–1892)
- Sir Patrick Bishop; MP for Harrow Central (1950–1964)
- Sir Cyril Black; MP for Wimbledon (1950–1970)
- John Blackburn; MP for Dudley West (1979–1994)
- John Ireland Blackburne; MP for Warrington (1835–1857)
- John Ireland Blackburne; MP for South West Lancashire (1875–1885)
- Bob Blackman; MP for Harrow East (2010–present)
- William Seymour Blackstone; MP for Wallingford (1834–1852)
- Nicola Blackwood; MP for Oxford West and Abingdon (2010–2017)
- Peter Blaker; MP for Blackpool South (1964–1992)
- Crispin Blunt; MP for Reigate (1997–2024)
- Tom Boardman; MP for Leicester South West (1967–1974) and Leicester South (1974)
- Sir Richard Body; MP for Billericay (1955–1959), Holland with Boston (1966–1997) and Boston and Skegness (1997–2001)
- Henry George Boldero; MP for Chippenham (1835–1859)
- Sir Dennis Boles; MP for Wellington (Somerset) (1911–1918) and Taunton (1918–1921)
- Dennis Boles; MP for Wells (1939–1951)
- Nick Boles; MP for Grantham and Stamford (2010–2019)
- William Bolling; MP for Bolton (1834–1841; 1847–1848)
- Joshua Bond; MP for Armagh City (1855–1857; 1859–1865)
- Peter Bone; MP for Wellingborough (2005–2023)
- Francis Robert Bonham; MP for Harwich (1835–1837)
- Sir Nicholas Bonsor, 4th Baronet; MP for Nantwich (1979–1983) and Upminster (1983–1997)
- Sarah Bool; MP for South Northamptonshire (2024–present)
- Thomas Boord; MP for Greenwich (1873–1895)
- Hartley Booth; MP for Finchley (1992–1997)
- Sir Robert Boothby; MP for Aberdeen and Kincardine East (1924–1950) and East Aberdeenshire (1950–1958)
- George Borwick; MP for Croydon North (1918–1922)
- Victoria Borwick; MP for Kensington (2015–2017)
- Robert Boscawen; MP for Wells (1970–1983) and Somerton and Frome (1983–1992)
- Sir Alfred Bossom, 1st Baronet; MP for Maidstone (1931–1959)
- Sir Clive Bossom, 2nd Baronet; MP for Leominster (1959–1974)
- Tim Boswell; MP for Daventry (1987–2010)
- Sir Peter Bottomley; MP for Woolwich West (1975–1983), Eltham (1983–1997) and Worthing West (1997–2024)
- Virginia Bottomley; MP for South West Surrey (1984–2005)
- Sir William Boulton, 1st Baronet; MP for Sheffield Central (1931–1945)
- Richard Bourke, 6th Baron Naas; MP for County Kildare (1847–1852), Coleraine (1852–1857) and Cockermouth (1857–1868)
- Robert Bourke; MP for King's Lynn (1868–1886)
- Anthony Bourne-Arton; MP for Darlington (1959–1964)
- Sir William Bovill; MP for Guildford (1857–1866)
- Sir Thomas Vansittart Bowater, 1st Baronet; MP for City of London (1924–1938)
- Sir Andrew Bowden; MP for Brighton Kemptown (1970–1997)
- Gerald Bowden; MP for Dulwich (1983–1992)
- Norman Bower; MP for Harrow (1941–1945) and Harrow West (1945–1951)
- Andrew Bowie; MP for West Aberdeenshire and Kincardine (2017–present)
- John Bowis; MP for Battersea (1987–1997)
- Thomas Gibson Bowles; MP for King's Lynn (1892–1906; 1910)
- Sir George Bowyer, 1st Baronet; MP for Buckingham (1918–1937)
- Donald Box; MP for Cardiff North (1959–1966)
- Sir Leslie Boyce; MP for Gloucester (1929–1945)
- Sir Archibald Boyd-Carpenter; MP for Bradford North (1918–1923), Coventry (1924–1929) and Chertsey (1931–1937)
- John Boyd-Carpenter; MP for Kingston-upon-Thames (1945–1972)
- Sir Edward Boyle, 3rd Baronet; MP for Birmingham Handsworth (1950–1970)
- Sir Rhodes Boyson; MP for Brent North (1974–1997)
- Brendan Bracken; MP for Paddington North (1929–1945), Bournemouth (1945–1950) and Bournemouth East and Christchurch (1950–1952)
- Langton Brackenbury; MP for Louth, Lincolnshire (1910; 1918–1920)
- Ben Bradley; MP for Mansfield (2017–2024)
- Dame Karen Bradley; MP for Staffordshire Moorlands (2010–present)
- Sir Graham Brady; MP for Altrincham and Sale West (1997–2024)
- Sir Bernard Braine; MP for Billericay (1950–1955), South East Essex (1955–1983) and Castle Point (1983–1992)
- Sir Albert Braithwaite; MP for Buckrose (1926–1945) and Harrow West (1951–1959)
- Sir Gurney Braithwaite, 1st Baronet; MP for Sheffield Hillsborough (1931–1935) and Holderness (1939–1950) and Bristol North West (1950–1955)
- Martin Brandon-Bravo; MP for Nottingham South (1983–1992)
- Aphra Brandreth; MP for Chester South and Eddisbury (2024–present)
- Gyles Brandreth; MP for City of Chester (1992–1997)
- Sir William Brass; MP for Clitheroe (1929–1945)
- Suella Braverman; MP for Fareham (2015–2024) and Fareham and Waterlooville (2024–present)
- Angie Bray; MP for Ealing Central and Acton (2010–2015)
- Ronald Bray; MP for Rossendale (1970–1974)
- Sir Julian Brazier; MP for Canterbury (1987–2017)
- Jack Brereton; MP for Stoke-on-Trent South (2017–2024)
- Sir William Brett; MP for Helston (1866–1868)
- John Brewis; MP for Galloway (1959–1974)
- George Bridgeman, 4th Viscount Newport; MP for North Shropshire (1867–1885)
- William Bridgeman; MP for Oswestry (1906–1929)
- Andrew Bridgen; MP for North West Leicestershire (2010–2023)
- Harold Briggs; MP for Manchester Blackley (1918–1923; 1924–1929)
- Sir Graham Bright; MP for Luton East (1979–1983) and Luton South (1983–1997)
- Steve Brine; MP for Winchester (2010–2024)
- Sir Tatton Brinton; MP for Kidderminster (1964–1974)
- Tim Brinton; MP for Gravesend (1979–1983) and Gravesham (1983–1987)
- Paul Bristow; MP for Peterborough (2019–2024)
- Sara Britcliffe; MP for Hyndburn (2019–2024)
- Sir Harry Brittain; MP for Acton (1918–1929)
- Leon Brittan; MP for Cleveland and Whitby (1974–1983) and Richmond (Yorks) (1983–1988)
- John Broadbent; MP for Ashton-under-Lyne (1931–1935)
- Sir George Broadbridge; MP for City of London (1938–1945)
- Sir Edmund Brocklebank; MP for Nottingham East (1924–1929) and Liverpool Fairfield (1931–1945)
- Christopher Brocklebank-Fowler; MP for King's Lynn (1970–1974) and North West Norfolk (1974–1981)
- St John Brodrick; MP for West Surrey (1880–1885) and Guildford (1885–1906)
- James Brokenshire; MP for Hornchurch (2005–2010) and Old Bexley and Sidcup (2010–2021)
- Sir Charles Broke Vere; MP for East Suffolk (1835–1843)
- Sir Walter Bromley-Davenport; MP for Knutsford (1945–1970)
- Henry Brooke; MP for Hampstead (1950–1966)
- Peter Brooke; MP for City of London and Westminster South (1977–1997) and Cities of London and Westminster (1997–2001)
- Sir William Cunliffe Brooks, 1st Baronet; MP for East Cheshire (1869–1885) and Altrincham (1886–1892)
- Richard Brooman-White; MP for Rutherglen (1951–1964)
- Michael Brotherton; MP for Louth, Lincolnshire (1974–1983)
- Urban Hanlon Broughton; MP for Preston (1915–1918)
- Alan Grahame Brown; MP for Tottenham (1962–1964)
- Sir Edward Brown; MP for Bath (1964–1979)
- Michael Brown; MP for Brigg and Scunthorpe (1979–1983) and Brigg and Cleethorpes (1983–1997)
- Anthony Browne; MP for South Cambridgeshire (2019–2024)
- John Browne; MP for Winchester (1979–1992)
- Percy Browne; MP for Torrington (1959–1964)
- Angela Browning; MP for Tiverton (1992–1997) and Tiverton and Honiton (1997–2010)
- Adelbert Brownlow-Cust; MP for North Shropshire (1866–1867)
- Fiona Bruce; MP for Congleton (2010–2024)
- Lord Ernest Bruce; MP for Marlborough (1834–1847)
- Lord Henry Bruce; MP for Chippenham (1886–1892)
- Ian Bruce; MP for South Dorset (1987–2001)
- Jock Bruce-Gardyne; MP for South Angus (1964–1974) and Knutsford (1979–1983)
- Francis Bruen; MP for Carlow (1835–1837; 1839)
- Henry Bruen; MP for County Carlow (1835; 1835–1837; 1840–1852)
- Henry Bruen; MP for County Carlow (1857–1880)
- Peter Bruinvels; MP for Leicester East (1983–1987)
- Gerald Brunskill; MP for Mid Tyrone (1910)
- Sir Paul Bryan; MP for Howden (1955–1983) and Boothferry (1983–1987)
- Felicity Buchan; MP for Kensington (2019–2024)
- Priscilla Buchan, Lady Tweedsmuir; MP for Aberdeen South (1946–1966)
- Patrick Buchan-Hepburn; MP for East Toxteth (1931–1950) and Beckenham (1950–1957)
- Alick Buchanan-Smith; MP for Angus North and Mearns (1964–1983) and Kincardine and Deeside (1983–1991)
- Sir Antony Buck; MP for Colchester (1961–1983) and Colchester North (1983–1992)
- Sir Henry Buckingham; MP for Guildford (1922–1931)
- Robert Buckland; MP for South Swindon (2010–2024)
- Nicholas Budgen; MP for Wolverhampton South West (1974–1997)
- Sir William Bull, 1st Baronet; MP for Hammersmith (1900–1918) and Hammersmith South (1918–1929)
- Denys Bullard; MP for South West Norfolk (1951–1955) and King's Lynn (1959–1964)
- Sir Eric Bullus; MP for Wembley North (1950–1974)
- Esmond Bulmer; MP for Kidderminster (1974–1983) and Wyre Forest (1983–1987)
- Ivor Bulmer-Thomas; MP for Keighley (1949–1950)
- Sir Frederick Burden; MP for Gillingham (1950–1983)
- William Burdett-Coutts; MP for Westminster (1885–1918) and Westminster Abbey (1918–1922)
- Alex Burghart; MP for Brentwood and Ongar (2017–present)
- Aidan Burley; MP for Cannock Chase (2010–2015)
- Dennistoun Burney; MP for Uxbridge (1922–1929)
- Sir Conor Burns; MP for Bournemouth West (2010–2024)
- Sir Simon Burns; MP for Chelmsford (1987–1997; 2010–2017) and West Chelmsford (1997–2010)
- Sir Percy Burrell, 4th Baronet; MP for New Shoreham (1862–1876)
- David Burrowes; MP for Enfield Southgate (2005–2017)
- Alistair Burt; MP for Bury North (1983–1997) and North East Bedfordshire (2001–2019; 2019)
- Henry Burton; MP for Sudbury (1924–1945)
- Sir Herbert Butcher, 1st Baronet; MP for Holland with Boston (1950–1966)
- Sir John Butcher, 1st Baronet; MP for York (1892–1906; 1910–1923)
- John Butcher; MP for Coventry South West (1979–1997)
- Sir Adam Butler; MP for Bosworth (1970–1987)
- Chris Butler; MP for Warrington South (1987–1992)
- Peter Butler; MP for North East Milton Keynes (1992–1997)
- Richard Austen Butler; MP for Saffron Walden (1929–1965)
- Rob Butler; MP for Aylesbury (2019–2024)
- Isaac Butt; MP for Youghal (1852–1865)
- Sir John Butterfill; MP for Bournemouth West (1983–2010)
- Ronald Buxton; MP for Leyton (1965–1966)
- Dan Byles; MP for North Warwickshire (2010–2015)

=== C ===
- Jocelyn Cadbury; MP for Birmingham Northfield (1979–1982)
- Sir Edward Cadogan; MP for Reading (1922–1923), Finchley (1924–1935) and Bolton (1940–1945)
- George Cadogan, 4th Viscount Chelsea; MP for Bath (1873)
- Henry Cadogan, 5th Viscount Chelsea; MP for Bury St Edmunds (1892–1900)
- Alun Cairns; MP for Vale of Glamorgan (2010–2024)
- Sir Hugh Cairns; MP for Belfast (1852–1866)
- **David Cameron**; MP for Witney (2001–2016)
- Donald Cameron, 24th Lochiel of Clan Cameron; MP for Inverness-shire (1868–1885)
- Lisa Cameron MP for East Kilbride, Strathaven and Lesmahagow (2023–2024)
- Bruce Campbell; MP for Oldham West (1968–1970)
- Sir Edward Campbell, 1st Baronet; MP for Camberwell North West (1924–1929) and Bromley (1930–1945)
- Gordon Campbell; MP for Moray and Nairn (1959–1974)
- William Campion; MP for Lewes (1910–1924)
- John Carlisle; MP for Luton West (1979–1983) and Luton North (1983–1997)
- Kenneth Carlisle
- Mark Carlisle
- Neil Carmichael; MP for Stroud (2010–2017)
- Douglas Carnegie
- Swynfen Carnegie
- Robert Carr; MP for Mitcham (1950–1974) and Carshalton (1974–1976)
- William Compton Carr
- Matthew Carrington
- Edward Carson, Baron Carson
- Edward Carson
- Douglas Carswell; MP for Harwich (2005–2010) and Clacton (2010–2014)
- Andy Carter; MP for Warrington South (2019–2024)
- James Cartlidge; MP for South Suffolk (2015–present)
- Michael Carttiss; MP for Great Yarmouth (1983–1997)
- William Carver
- Sir Robert Cary, 1st Baronet
- Sir Bill Cash; MP for Stafford (1984–1997) and Stone (1997–2024)
- Felix Cassel
- James Cassels
- Viscount Castlereagh (Charles Vane-Tempest-Stewart, 7th Marquess of Londonderry)
- Miriam Cates; MP for Penistone and Stocksbridge (2019–2024)
- Maria Caulfield; MP for Lewes (2015–2024)
- George Cave, 1st Viscount Cave
- Edward Cavendish, 10th Duke of Devonshire
- William Cavendish-Bentinck, 7th Duke of Portland
- Frederick Campbell, Viscount Emlyn; MP for Carmarthenshire (1874–1885)
- Victor Cazalet; MP for Chippenham (1924–1943)
- Thelma Cazalet-Keir; MP for Islington East (1931–1945)
- David Cecil, 6th Marquess of Exeter
- Evelyn Cecil, 1st Baron Rockley
- Hugh Cecil, 1st Baron Quickswood
- Lord Eustace Cecil
- Robert Cecil, 1st Viscount Cecil of Chelwood
- William Cecil, 3rd Marquess of Exeter
- Alex Chalk; MP for Cheltenham (2015–2024)
- Lynda Chalker; MP for Wallasey (1974–1992)
- Sir Austen Chamberlain; MP for East Worcestershire (1912–1914) and Birmingham West (1914–1937)
- **Neville Chamberlain**; MP for Birmingham Ladywood (1918–1929) and Birmingham Edgbaston (1929–1940)
- Sir Henry Channon; MP for Southend (1935–1950) and Southend West (1950–1958)
- Paul Channon; MP for Southend West (1959–1997)
- Henry Chaplin, 1st Viscount Chaplin
- Judith Chaplin; MP for Newbury (1992–1993)
- Sir Robert Chapman, 1st Baronet
- Sydney Chapman; MP for Birmingham Handsworth (1970–1974) and Chipping Barnet (1979–2005)
- Albany Charlesworth; MP for Wakefield (1892–1895)
- John Charlesworth; MP for Wakefield (1857–1859)
- Christopher Chataway; MP for Lewisham North (1959–1966) and Chichester (1969–1974)
- Hedges Eyre Chatterton
- George Tomkyns Chesney
- Sir Watson Cheyne, 1st Baronet
- Lord Arthur Chichester
- Lord John Chichester
- Sir Smith Child, 1st Baronet
- Sir Smith Child, 2nd Baronet
- Alexander William Chisholm; MP for Inverness-shire (1835–1838)
- Rehman Chishti; MP for Gillingham and Rainham (2010–2024)
- Hugh Cholmondeley, 2nd Baron Delamere
- William Cholmondeley, 3rd Marquess of Cholmondeley
- Sir Christopher Chope; MP for Southampton Itchen (1983–1992) and Christchurch (1997–present)
- James Christie
- William Christmas; MP for Waterford City (1834–1835; 1841–1842)
- Jo Churchill; MP for Bury St Edmunds (2015–2024)
- Lord Randolph Churchill; MP for Woodstock (1874–1885) and Paddington South (1885–1895)
- Randolph Churchill; MP for Preston (1940–1945)
- **Sir Winston Churchill**; MP for Oldham (1900–1906) Manchester North West, (1906–1908) Dundee (1908–1922), Epping (1924–1945) and Woodford (1945–1964)
- Winston Churchill; MP for Stretford (1970–1983) and Davyhulme (1983–1997)
- James Clappison; MP for Hertsmere (1992–2015)
- Alan Clark; MP for Plymouth Sutton (1974–1992) and Kensington and Chelsea (1997–1999)
- Colin Clark; MP for Gordon (2017–2019)
- Greg Clark; MP for Tunbridge Wells (2005–2019; 2019–2024)
- Michael Clark; MP for Rochford (1983–1997) and Rayleigh (1997–2001)
- Sir William Clark; MP for Nottingham South (1959–1966), East Surrey (1970–1974) and Croydon South (1974–1992)
- Kenneth Clarke; MP for Rushcliffe (1970–2019)
- Sir Simon Clarke; MP for Middlesbrough South and East Cleveland (2017–2024)
- Terence Clarke; MP for Portsmouth West (1950–1966)
- Theo Clarke; MP for Stafford (2019–2024)
- Brendan Clarke-Smith; MP for Bassetlaw (2019–2024)
- Chris Clarkson; MP for Heywood and Middleton (2019–2024)
- Sir Reginald Clarry; MP for Newport (1922–1929; 1931–1945)
- Nathaniel George Clayton; MP for Hexham (1892–1893)
- Leonard Cleaver; MP for Birmingham Yardley (1959–1964)
- Sir Walter Clegg; MP for North Fylde (1966–1983) and Wyre (1983–1987)
- James Cleverly; MP for Braintree (2015–present)
- Douglas Clifton Brown; MP for Hexham (1918–1923; 1924–1943)
- Howard Clifton Brown; MP for Newbury (1922–1924; 1924–1945)
- Geoffrey Clifton-Brown; MP for Bury St Edmunds (1945–1950)
- Sir Geoffrey Clifton-Brown; MP for Cirencester and Tewkesbury (1992–1997), Cotswold (1997–2010), The Cotswolds (2010–2024) and North Cotswold (2024–present)
- Robert Henry Clive
- James Avon Clyde, Lord Clyde
- James Latham Clyde, Lord Clyde
- Sir Stuart Coats, 2nd Baronet; MP for Wimbledon (1916–1918) and East Surrey (1918–1922)
- Edward Cobb; MP for Preston (1936–1945)
- Sir George Cockburn, 10th Baronet
- Eric Cockeram
- Lewis Cocking; MP for Broxbourne (2024–present)
- John Cockroft
- Sebastian Coe; MP for Falmouth and Camborne (1992–1997)
- Thérèse Coffey; MP for Suffolk Coastal (2010–2024)
- Brunel Cohen; MP for Liverpool Fairfield (1918–1931)
- Elliot Colburn; MP for Carshalton and Wallington (2019–2024)
- Arthur Henry Cole; MP for Enniskillen (1834–1844)
- Henry Cole; MP for Enniskillen (1844–1851) and County Fermanagh (1851–1880)
- John Lowry Cole; MP for Enniskillen (1859–1868)
- Lowry Cole, 4th Viscount Cole; MP for Enniskillen (1880–1885)
- Norman Cole; MP for South Bedfordshire (1951–1966)
- William Cole, 3rd Viscount Cole; MP for County Fermanagh (1834–1840)
- Philip Colfox
- Richard Collard
- Jesse Collings
- Damian Collins; MP for Folkestone and Hythe (2010–2024)
- Tim Collins; MP for Westmorland and Lonsdale (1997–2005)
- John Colomb
- John Colville, 1st Baron Clydesmuir
- Oliver Colvile; MP for Plymouth Sutton and Devonport (2010–2017)
- Michael Colvin; MP for Romsey and Waterside (1983–1997) and Romsey (1997–2000)
- John Cooper; MP for Dumfries and Galloway (2024–present)
- Alberto Costa; MP for South Leicestershire (2015–present)
- Sir Roger Conant, 1st Baronet
- David Congdon
- Henry Francis Compton; MP for New Forest (1905–1906)
- Derek Conway; MP for Shrewsbury and Atcham (1983–1997) and Old Bexley and Sidcup (2001–2008)
- Sir Martin Conway; MP for Combined English Universities (1918–1931)
- Sir Thomas Cook; MP for North Norfolk (1931–1945)
- Gresham Cooke; MP for Twickenham (1955–1970)
- Robert Cooke; MP for Bristol West (1957–1979)
- Anthony Coombs
- Derek Coombs
- Simon Coombs; MP for Swindon (1983–1997)
- Octavius Coope; MP for Great Yarmouth (1847–1848), Middlesex (1874–1885) and Brentford (1885–1886)
- Thomas Cooper, 1st Baron Cooper of Culross
- Albert Cooper
- Duff Cooper
- Neill Cooper-Key
- John Cope, Baron Cope of Berkeley
- William Cope, 1st Baron Cope
- Thomas Corbett; MP for North Lincolnshire (1835–1837)
- Thomas Lorimer Corbett; MP for North Down (1890–1910)
- John Cordeaux
- John Cordle
- Frederick Corfield
- Patrick Cormack; MP for Cannock (1970–1974), South West Staffordshire (1974–1983) and South Staffordshire (1983–2010)
- Fiennes Cornwallis, 1st Baron Cornwallis
- John Corrie
- Sir James Corry, 1st Baronet
- Albert Costain
- James Couchman
- Michael Coulson
- John Sewell Courtauld
- Philip Courtenay; MP for Bridgwater (1837–1841)
- Anthony Courtney; MP for Harrow East (1959–1966)
- Robert Courts; MP for Witney (2016–2024)
- Claire Coutinho; MP for East Surrey (2019–present)
- William Henry Cowan
- Sir Geoffrey Cox; MP for Torridge and West Devon (2005–2024) and Torridge and Tavistock (2024–present)
- Irwin Cox
- Stephen Crabb; MP for Preseli Pembrokeshire (2005–2024)
- Beresford Craddock
- Reginald Craddock
- John Craik-Henderson
- James Cran; MP for Beverley (1987–1997) and Beverley and Holderness (1997–2005)
- James Gascoyne-Cecil, 2nd Marquess of Salisbury
- William Craven-Ellis
- Aidan Crawley
- Sir Cresswell Cresswell; MP for Liverpool (1837–1842)
- John Crichton, 4th Viscount Crichton; MP for Enniskillen (1868–1880) and County Fermanagh (1880–1885)
- Lord Colum Crichton-Stuart
- Charles Cripps, 1st Baron Parmoor
- William Cripps
- Alfred Critchley
- Julian Critchley
- Henry Page Croft, 1st Baron Croft
- Chichester Crookshank; MP for Berwick and Haddington (1924–1929) and Bootle (1931–1935)
- Harry Crookshank; MP for Gainsborough (1924–1956)
- Virginia Crosbie; MP for Ynys Môn (2019–2024)
- Harriet Cross; MP for Gordon and Buchan (2024–present)
- Richard Assheton Cross
- Sir Ronald Cross, 1st Baronet
- Oliver Crosthwaite-Eyre
- David Crouch
- Dame Tracey Crouch: MP for Chatham and Aylesford (2010–2024)
- John Crowder
- Petre Crowder
- Bernard Cruddas: MP for Wansbeck (1931–1940)
- William Cruddas; MP for Newcastle-upon-Tyne (1895–1900)
- George Cubitt, 1st Baron Ashcombe
- Henry Cubitt, 2nd Baron Ashcombe
- William Cubitt
- John Cuffe, 3rd Viscount Castlecuffe; MP for Ipswich (1842)
- Charles Cumming-Bruce; MP for Inverness Burghs (1834–1837) and Elginshire and Nairnshire (1840–1868)
- Philip Cunliffe-Lister, 1st Earl of Swinton
- Knox Cunningham
- Alec Cunningham-Reid; MP for Warrington (1922–1923; 1924–1929) and St Marylebone (1932–1942)
- Charles Curran
- Edwina Currie; MP for South Derbyshire (1983–1997)
- David Curry; MP for Skipton and Ripon (1987–2010)
- Francis Curzon, 5th Earl Howe
- George Curzon, 1st Marquess Curzon of Kedleston
- Harry Cust; MP for Stamford (1890–1895) and Bermondsey (1900–1906)

=== D ===
- Sir John Dalrymple-Hay, 3rd Baronet; MP for Wakefield (1862–1865), Stamford (1866–1880) and Wigtown Burghs (1880–1885)
- Sir Godfrey Dalrymple-White, 1st Baronet; MP for Southport (1910–1923; 1924–1931)
- James Daly; MP for Bury North (2019–2024)
- James Dance; MP for Bromsgrove (1955–1971)
- Charles Darling; MP for Deptford (1888–1897)
- Sir William Darling; MP for Edinburgh South (1945–1957)
- Frances Davidson, Viscountess Davidson; MP for Hemel Hempstead (1937–1959)
- John Colin Campbell Davidson; MP for Hemel Hempstead (1920–1923; 1924–1937)
- Byron Davies; MP for Gower (2015–2017)
- Chris Davies; MP for Brecon and Radnorshire (2015–2019)
- David Davies; MP for Monmouth (2005–2024)
- Gareth Davies; MP for Grantham and Stamford (2019–2024) and Grantham and Bourne (2024–present)
- George Davies; MP for Yeovil (1923–1945)
- Glyn Davies; MP for Montgomeryshire (2010–2019)
- James Davies; MP for Vale of Clwyd (2015–2017; 2019–2024)
- John Davies; MP for Knutsford (1970–1978)
- Mims Davies; MP for Eastleigh (2015–2019), Mid Sussex (2019–2024) and East Grinstead and Uckfield (2024–present)
- Nigel Davies; MP for Epping (1950–1951)
- Philip Davies; MP for Shipley (2005–2024)
- Quentin Davies; MP for Stamford and Spalding (1983–1997) and Grantham and Stamford (1997–2007)
- Wyndham Davies; MP for Birmingham Perry Barr (1964–1966)
- Henry d'Avigdor-Goldsmid
- James d'Avigdor-Goldsmid
- David Davis; MP for Boothferry (1987–1997), Haltemprice and Howden (1997–2024) and Goole and Pocklington (2024–present)
- Dehenna Davison; MP for Bishop Auckland (2019–2024)
- Richard Davison; MP for Belfast (1852–1860)
- William Davison, 1st Baron Broughshane
- Stephen Day; MP for Cheadle (1987–2001)
- Arthur Dean; MP for Holland with Boston (1924–1929)
- Paul Dean, Baron Dean of Harptree
- Percy Thompson Dean
- Bill Deedes; MP for Ashford (1950–1974)
- Nick de Bois; MP for Enfield North (2010–2015)
- Basil de Ferranti
- Thomas de Grey, 6th Baron Walsingham
- Henry de Worms; MP for Greenwich (1880–1885) and Liverpool East Toxteth (1885–1895)
- John McAusland Denny; MP for Kilmarnock Burghs (1895–1906)
- Alfred Arthur Hinchcliffe Denville
- James Despencer-Robertson
- Nirj Deva; MP for Brentford and Isleworth (1992–1997)
- Tim Devlin; MP for Stockton South (1987–1997)
- Charlie Dewhirst; MP for Bridlington and The Wolds (2024–present)
- Geoffrey Dickens; MP for Huddersfield West (1979–1983) and Littleborough and Saddleworth (1983–1995)
- Terry Dicks; MP for Hayes and Harlington (1983–1997)
- John Dickson, 1st Baron Islington
- Edward Digby, 10th Baron Digby
- Simon Wingfield Digby
- Robert Dimsdale; MP for Hertford (1866–1874) and Hitchin (1885–1892)
- Caroline Dinenage; MP for Gosport (2010–present)
- Sarah Dines; MP for Derbyshire Dales (2019–2024)
- **Benjamin Disraeli**; MP for Maidstone (1837–1841), Shrewsbury (1841–1847) and Buckinghamshire (1847–1876)
- Coningsby Disraeli; MP for Altrincham (1892–1906)
- Piers Dixon; MP for Truro (1970–1974)
- Jonathan Djanogly; MP for Huntingdon (2001–2024)
- Leo Docherty; MP for Aldershot (2017–2024)
- Douglas Dodds-Parker
- Geoffrey Dodsworth; MP for South West Hertfordshire (1974–1979)
- Charles Donaldson
- Michelle Donelan; MP for Chippenham (2015–2024)
- Reginald Dorman-Smith
- Stephen Dorrell; MP for Loughborough (1979–1997) and Charnwood (1997–2015)
- Nadine Dorries; MP for Mid Bedfordshire (2005–2012; 2013–2023)
- Steve Double; MP for St Austell and Newquay (2015–2024)
- Charles Doughty; MP for East Surrey (1951–1970)
- Lord James Douglas-Hamilton; MP for Edinburgh West (1974–1997)
- Lord Malcolm Douglas-Hamilton
- **Sir Alec Douglas-Home**; MP for Lanark (1931–1945; 1950–1951) and Kinross and Western Perthshire (1963–1974)
- Den Dover; MP for Chorley (1979–1997)
- Sir Oliver Dowden; MP for Hertsmere (2015–present)
- Dame Jackie Doyle-Price; MP for Thurrock (2010–2024)
- Burnaby Drayson
- Richard Drax; MP for South Dorset (2010–2024)
- Cedric Drewe
- Flick Drummond; MP for Portsmouth South (2015–2017) and Meon Valley (2019–2024)
- Henry Drummond Wolff
- Henry Maxence Cavendish Drummond Wolff
- Edward du Cann
- Arthur Duckworth; MP for Shrewsbury (1929–1945)
- William Baring du Pré
- James Duddridge; MP for Rochford and Southend East (2005–2024)
- Rolf Dudley-Williams
- John Dugdale; MP for Nuneaton (1886–1892)
- Thomas Dugdale, 1st Baron Crathorne
- Hubert Duggan
- David Duguid; MP for Banff and Buchan (2017–2024)
- George Dunbar; MP for Belfast (1835–1837; 1838–1841)
- Sir Alan Duncan; MP for Rutland and Melton (1992–2019)
- Sir James Duncan, 1st Baronet
- Peter Duncan; MP for Galloway and Upper Nithsdale (2001–2005)
- Sir Iain Duncan Smith; MP for Chingford (1992–1997) and Chingford and Woodford Green (1997–present)
- Arthur Duncombe; MP for East Retford (1835–1852) and East Riding of Yorkshire (1852–1868)
- Arthur Duncombe; MP for Howdenshire (1885–1892)
- Bob Dunn; MP for Dartford (1979–1997)
- Philip Dunne; MP for Ludlow (2005–2024)
- Philip Russell Rendel Dunne
- Caledon Du Pré
- Tony Durant
- William Duthie
- Hugh Dykes, Baron Dykes

=== E ===
- John Eastwood; MP for Kettering (1931–1940)
- Mark Eastwood; MP for Dewsbury (2019–2024)
- Sir David Eccles; MP for Chippenham (1943–1962)
- Peter Eckersley; MP for Manchester Exchange (1935–1940)
- **Sir Anthony Eden**; MP for Warwick and Leamington (1923–1957)
- Sir John Eden, 7th and 9th Baronet; MP for Bournemouth West (1954–1983)
- Albert Edmondson, 1st Baron Sandford
- Alfred Edwards; MP for Middlesbrough East (1949–1950)
- Nicholas Edwards, Baron Crickhowell
- Ruth Edwards; MP for Rushcliffe (2019–2024)
- Arthur Egerton, 3rd Earl of Wilton
- George Egerton, 2nd Earl of Ellesmere
- Tim Eggar; MP for Enfield North (1979–1997)
- Harold Elletson; MP for Blackpool North (1992–1997)
- Sir George Elliot, 1st Baronet
- Walter Elliot
- William Elliot; MP for Newcastle upon Tyne North (1957–1983)
- Michael Ellis; MP for Northampton North (2010–2024)
- Sir Robert Ellis, 1st Baronet
- Jane Ellison; MP for Battersea (2010–2017)
- George Sampson Elliston
- Tobias Ellwood; MP for Bournemouth East (2005–2024)
- Charlie Elphicke; MP for Dover (2010–2017; 2018–2019)
- Natalie Elphicke; MP for Dover (2019–2024)
- Peter Emery; MP for Reading (1959–1966), Honiton (1967–1997) and East Devon (1997–2001)
- Evelyn Emmet, Baroness Emmet of Amberley
- Paul Emrys-Evans
- Cyril Entwistle
- Eric Errington
- Frederick Erroll, 1st Baron Erroll of Hale
- John Erskine, Lord Erskine
- Clifford Erskine-Bolst
- Reginald Essenhigh
- George Eustice; MP for Camborne and Redruth (2010–2024)
- Henry Arthur Evans
- David Evans; MP for Welwyn Hatfield (1987–1997)
- Graham Evans; MP for Weaver Vale (2010–2017)
- Jonathan Evans; MP for Brecon and Radnorshire (1992–1997) and Cardiff North (2010–2015)
- Luke Evans; MP for Bosworth (2019–2024) and Hinckley and Bosworth (2024–present)
- Nigel Evans; MP for Ribble Valley (1992–2013; 2014–2024)
- Roger Kenneth Evans
- William Evans-Gordon
- Sir David Evennett; MP for Erith and Crayford (1983–1997) and Bexleyheath and Crayford (2005–2024)
- Ben Everitt; MP for Milton Keynes North (2019–2024)
- Sir William Ewart, 1st Baronet; MP for Belfast (1878–1885) and Belfast North (1885–1889)
- Henry Eyre; MP for Gainsborough (1886–1892)
- Sir Reginald Eyre; MP for Birmingham Hall Green (1965–1987)
- Bolton Eyres-Monsell; MP for Evesham (1910–1935)

=== F ===
- David Faber; MP for Westbury (1992–2001)
- Sir Denison Faber; MP for York (1900–1910) and Clapham (1910–1918)
- Sir Michael Fabricant; MP for Mid Staffordshire (1992–1997) and Lichfield (1997–2024)
- Sir Nicholas Fairbairn; MP for Kinross and Western Perthshire (1974–1983) and Perth and Kinross (1983–1995)
- James Griffyth Fairfax; MP for Norwich (1924–1929)
- Sir Russell Fairgrieve; MP for Aberdeenshire West (1974–1983)
- Sheila Faith; MP for Belper (1979–1983)
- Sir Bertram Falle, 1st Baronet; MP for Portsmouth (1910–1918) and Portsmouth North (1918–1934)
- Sir Michael Fallon; MP for Darlington (1983–1992) and Sevenoaks (1997–2019)
- Frederick Farey-Jones; MP for Watford (1955–1964)
- Sir John Farr; MP for Harborough (1959–1992)
- Laura Farris; MP for Newbury (2019–2024)
- Anthony Favell; MP for Stockport (1983–1992)
- Sir Anthony Fell; MP for Yarmouth (1951–1966; 1970–1983)
- Sir Arthur Fell; MP for Great Yarmouth (1906–1922)
- Simon Fell; MP for Barrow and Furness (2019–2024)
- Dame Peggy Fenner; MP for Rochester and Chatham (1970–1974; 1979–1983) and Medway (1983–1997)
- Hugh Ferguson
- John Ferguson
- Maurice Burke Roche, 4th Baron Fermoy
- Charles Duncombe, 2nd Earl of Feversham
- Michael Fidler
- Barry John Anthony Field
- Mark Field; MP for Cities of London and Westminster (2001–2019)
- Graeme Finlay
- Geoffrey Finsberg
- Anna Firth; MP for Southend West (2022–2024)
- Dudley Fishburn
- Nigel Fisher
- William Hayes Fisher, 1st Baron Downham
- Sir Frederick Fison, 1st Baronet; MP for Doncaster (1895–1906)
- Edmund FitzAlan-Howard, 1st Viscount FitzAlan of Derwent
- William Vesey-FitzGerald, 2nd Baron FitzGerald and Vesey
- Edward FitzRoy
- Roger Fleetwood-Hesketh
- David Fleming, Lord Fleming
- Edward Fleming
- Valentine Fleming
- John Willis Fleming
- Alexander Fletcher; MP for Edinburgh North (1973–1983) and Edinburgh Central (1983–1987)
- Katherine Fletcher; MP for South Ribble (2019–2024)
- Mark Fletcher; MP for Bolsover (2019–2024)
- Nick Fletcher; MP for Don Valley (2019–2024)
- Sir Walter Fletcher; MP for Bury (1945–1950) and Bury and Radcliffe (1950–1955)
- Charles Fletcher-Cooke
- John Fletcher-Cooke
- William Fletcher-Vane, 1st Baron Inglewood
- Howard Flight; MP for Arundel and South Downs (1997–2005)
- Adrian Flook; MP for Taunton (2001–2005)
- Janet Fookes, Baroness Fookes
- Vicky Ford; MP for Chelmsford (2017–2024)
- Leolin Forestier-Walker
- Nigel Forman; MP for Carshalton (1976–1983) and Carshalton and Wallington (1983–1997)
- Henry Forster, 1st Baron Forster
- Michael Forsyth; MP for Stirling (1983–1997)
- Tim Fortescue; MP for Liverpool Garston (1966–1974)
- James Fortescue Flannery
- Eric Forth; MP for Mid Worcestershire (1983–1997) and Bromley and Chislehurst (1997–2006)
- Peter Fortune; MP for Bromley and Biggin Hill (2024–present)
- Sir Harry Foster; MP for Lowestoft (1892–1900; 1910) and Portsmouth Central (1924–1929)
- Sir John Foster; MP for Northwich (1945–1974)
- Kevin Foster; MP for Torbay (2015–2024)
- Sir Norman Fowler; MP for Nottingham South (1970–1974) and Sutton Coldfield (1974–2001)
- Ashley Fox; MP for Bridgwater (2024–present)
- Liam Fox; MP for Woodspring (1992–2010) and North Somerset (2010–2024)
- Sir Marcus Fox; MP for Shipley (1970–1997)
- Mark Francois; MP for Rayleigh (2001–2010) and Rayleigh and Wickford (2010–present)
- Cecil Franks
- Christopher Fraser; MP for Mid Dorset and North Poole (1997–2001) and South West Norfolk (2005–2010)
- Sir Hugh Fraser; MP for Stone (1945–1950), Stafford and Stone (1950–1983) and Stafford (1983–1984)
- Ian Fraser, Baron Fraser of Lonsdale
- Ian Montagu Fraser
- Sir Keith Fraser, 5th Baronet; MP for Harborough (1918–1923)
- Peter Fraser, Baron Fraser of Carmyllie
- Lucy Frazer; MP for South East Cambridgeshire (2015–2024)
- Walter de Frece
- George Freeman; MP for Mid Norfolk (2010–present)
- Roger Freeman, Baron Freeman
- Mike Freer; MP for Finchley and Golders Green (2010–2024)
- Denzil Freeth; MP for Basingstoke (1955–1964)
- Douglas French; MP for Gloucester (1987–1997)
- Louie French; MP for Old Bexley and Sidcup (2021–present)
- James William Freshfield; MP for Penryn and Falmouth (1835–1841; 1852–1857) and Boston (1851–1852)
- Thomas Frewen Turner; MP for South Leicestershire (1835–1836)
- Sir Peter Fry; MP for Wellingborough (1969–1997)
- Lorraine Fullbrook; MP for South Ribble (2010–2015)
- Richard Fuller; MP for Bedford (2010–2017), North East Bedfordshire (2019–2024) and North Bedfordshire (2024–present)
- Alexander Fuller-Acland-Hood, 1st Baron St Audries
- Marcus Fysh; MP for Yeovil (2015–2024)

=== G ===
- Anthony Gadie; MP for Bradford Central (1924–1929)
- Sir Thomas Galbraith; MP for Glasgow Hillhead (1966–1982)
- Sir Roger Gale; MP for North Thanet (1983–2024) and Herne Bay and Sandwich (2024–present)
- Roy Galley; MP for Halifax (1983–1987)
- Phil Gallie; MP for Ayr (1992–1997)
- Henry Gally Knight; MP for North Nottinghamshire (1835–1846)
- Sir David Gammans, 1st Baronet; MP for Hornsey (1941–1957)
- Muriel Gammans; MP for Hornsey (1957–1966)
- Sir George Gardiner; MP for Reigate (1974–1997)
- Sir Edward Gardner; MP for Billericay (1959–1966), Fylde South (1970–1983) and Fylde (1983–1987)
- Sir Ernest Gardner; MP for Wokingham (1901–1918) and Windsor (1918–1922)
- Tristan Garel-Jones; MP for Watford (1979–1997)
- Edward Garnier; MP for Harborough (1992–2017)
- Mark Garnier; MP for Wyre Forest (2010–present)
- James Gascoyne-Cecil, 11th Viscount Cranborne; MP for Darwen (1885–1892) and Rochester (1893–1903)
- **Robert Gascoyne-Cecil, 10th Viscount Cranborne**; MP for Stamford (1853–1868)
- Robert Gascoyne-Cecil, 12th Viscount Cranborne; MP for South Dorset (1929–1941)
- Robert Gascoyne-Cecil, 13th Viscount Cranborne; MP for Bournemouth West (1950–1954)
- Robert Gascoyne-Cecil, 14th Viscount Cranborne; MP for South Dorset (1979–1987)
- James Milnes Gaskell; MP for Much Wenlock (1834–1868)
- Ernest Gates; MP for Middleton and Prestwich (1940–1951)
- John Gathorne-Hardy; MP for Rye (1868–1880), Mid Kent (1884–1885) and Medway (1885–1892)
- David Gauke; MP for South West Hertfordshire (2005–2019)
- Hamilton Gault; MP for Taunton (1924–1935)
- Sir Guy Gaunt; MP for Buckrose (1922–1926)
- Auckland Geddes; MP for Basingstoke (1917–1920)
- Sir Eric Geddes; MP for Cambridge (1917–1922)
- Robert Gee; MP for Woolwich East (1921–1922) and Bosworth (1924–1927)
- John George; MP for County Wexford (1852–1857; 1859–1866)
- Sir John George; MP for Glasgow Pollok (1955–1964)
- Nus Ghani; MP for Wealden (2015–2024) and Sussex Weald (2024–present)
- Samuel Gibson Getty; MP for Belfast (1860–1868)
- Nick Gibb; MP for Bognor Regis and Littlehampton (1997–2024)
- William Gibbons; MP for Bilston (1944–1945)
- Edward Gibson; MP for Dublin University (1875–1885)
- Peter Gibson; MP for Darlington (2019–2024)
- Thomas Milner Gibson
- David Gibson-Watt, Baron Gibson-Watt
- Jo Gideon; MP for Stoke-on-Trent Central (2019–2024)
- Christopher Gill; MP for Ludlow (1987–1994; 1995–2001)
- Dame Cheryl Gillan; MP for Chesham and Amersham (1992–2021)
- Sir Ian Gilmour, 3rd Baronet; MP for Central Norfolk (1962–1974) and Chesham and Amersham (1974–1992)
- Sir John Gilmour, 2nd Baronet; MP for East Renfrewshire (1910–1918) and Glasgow Pollok (1918–1940)
- Sir John Gilmour, 3rd Baronet; MP for East Fife (1961–1979)
- John Neilson Gladstone; MP for Walsall (1841), Ipswich (1842–1847) and Devizes (1852–1857; 1859–1863)
- Thomas Gladstone; MP for Portarlington (1834–1835), Leicester (1835–1837) and Ipswich (1842)
- William Ewart Gladstone; MP for Newark (1834–1846)
- Sir Richard Atwood Glass
- Gilbert Gledhill; MP for Halifax (1931–1945)
- John Glen; MP for Salisbury (2010–present)
- Clifford Glossop
- Sir Douglas Glover; MP for Ormskirk (1953–1970)
- Louis Gluckstein
- Alan Glyn
- Ralph Glyn, 1st Baron Glyn
- Richard Glyn
- Sir Stephen Glynne, 9th Baronet
- Joseph Godber
- Sir Park Goff
- Thomas William Goff; MP for County Roscommon (1859–1860)
- Zac Goldsmith; MP for Richmond Park (2010–2016; 2017–2019)
- Philip Goodhart
- Victor Goodhew
- Alastair Goodlad, Baron Goodlad; MP for Northwich (1974–1983) and Eddisbury (1983–1999)
- Albert Goodman
- Paul Goodman; MP for Wycombe (2001–2010)
- Charles Goodson-Wickes
- Robert Goodwill; MP for Scarborough and Whitby (2005–2024)
- Matthew Gordon-Banks; MP for Southport (1992–1997)
- Lord Walter Gordon-Lennox
- Sir Frederic Gorell Barnes; MP for Faversham (1895–1900)
- Teresa Gorman; MP for Billericay (1987–1994; 1995–2001)
- John Eldon Gorst
- John Michael Gorst
- Frederick Gough
- Henry Goulburn
- Michael Gove; MP for Surrey Heath (2005–2024)
- Ian Gow; MP for Eastbourne (1974–1990)
- Sir Raymond Gower; MP for Barry (1951–1983) and Vale of Glamorgan (1983–1989)
- Sir Fergus Graham, 5th Baronet; MP for North Cumberland (1926–1935) and Darlington (1951–1959)
- Luke Graham; MP for Ochil and South Perthshire (2017–2019)
- Richard Graham; MP for Gloucester (2010–2024)
- Anthony Grant
- Bill Grant; MP for Ayr, Carrick and Cumnock (2017–2019)
- Francis William Grant; MP for Inverness-shire (1838–1840)
- Helen Grant; MP for Maidstone and The Weald (2010–2024) and Maidstone and Malling (2024–present)
- Sir James Augustus Grant, 1st Baronet
- Robert Grant-Ferris
- Sir William Grantham; MP for East Surrey (1874–1885) and Croydon (1885–1886)
- Nicholas Grattan-Doyle
- Frances Marjorie Graves
- Hamish Gray, Baron Gray of Contin
- James Gray; MP for North Wiltshire (1997–2024)
- Chris Grayling; MP for Epsom and Ewell (2001–2024)
- Albert Green; MP for Derby (1918–1922)
- Alan Green; MP for Preston South (1955–1964; 1970–1974)
- Chris Green; MP for Bolton West (2015–2024)
- Damian Green; MP for Ashford (1997–2024)
- Crawford Greene
- Justine Greening; MP for Putney (2005–2019)
- Harry Greenway
- John Greenway; MP for Ryedale (1987–2010)
- Thomas George Greenwell
- Hamar Greenwood, 1st Viscount Greenwood
- Conal Gregory
- Edward Grenfell; MP for City of London (1922–1935)
- William Grenfell; MP for Wycombe (1900–1905)
- Dominic Grieve; MP for Beaconsfield (1997–2019)
- Percy Grieve; MP for Solihull (1964–1983)
- Andrew Griffith; MP for Arundel and South Downs (2019–present)
- Sir Arthur Griffith-Boscawen; MP for Tunbridge (1892–1906), Dudley (1910–1921) and Taunton (1921–1922)
- Alison Griffiths; MP for Bognor Regis and Littlehampton (2024–present)
- Andrew Griffiths; MP for Burton (2010–2018; 2018–2019)
- Sir Eldon Griffiths; MP for Bury St Edmunds (1964–1992)
- Peter Griffiths; MP for Smethwick (1964–1966) and Portsmouth North (1979–1997)
- Edward Grigg, 1st Baron Altrincham
- Sir James Grigg; MP for Cardiff East (1942–1945)
- James Grimston, 2nd Earl of Verulam
- James Grundy; MP for Leigh (2019–2024)
- Robert Grimston, 1st Baron Grimston of Westbury
- Ian Grist
- Patrick Ground; MP for Feltham and Heston (1983–1992)
- Samuel Grove Price; MP for Sandwich (1835–1837)
- Michael Grylls
- Frederick Edward Guest
- Oscar Guest
- Gwendolen Guinness, 1st Viscountess Elveden
- Rupert Guinness, 2nd Earl of Iveagh
- Walter Guinness, 1st Baron Moyne
- Jonathan Gullis; MP for Stoke-on-Trent North (2019–2024)
- Ben Gummer; MP for Ipswich (2010–2017)
- John Gummer; MP for Lewisham West (1970–1974), Eye (1979–1983) and Suffolk Coastal (1983–2010)
- Derrick Gunston
- Sir Robert Gunter, 1st Baronet; MP for Knaresborough (1884–1885) and Barkston Ash (1885–1905)
- Harold Gurden
- Rupert Gwynne; MP for Eastbourne (1910–1924)
- Sam Gyimah; MP for East Surrey (2010–2019)

=== H ===
- Sir Douglas Hacking, 1st Baronet; MP for Chorley (1918–1945)
- William Hague; MP for Richmond (Yorks) (1989–2015)
- Kirstene Hair; MP for Angus (2017–2019)
- John Halcomb; MP for Dover (1834–1835)
- Robert Halfon; MP for Harlow (2010–2024)
- Sir Frederick Hall, 1st Baronet; MP for Dulwich (1910–1932)
- Joan Hall; MP for Keighley (1970–1974)
- Luke Hall; MP for Thornbury and Yate (2015–2024)
- Sir Reginald Hall; MP for Liverpool West Derby (1919–1923) and Eastbourne (1925–1929)
- Walter Hall; MP for Brecon and Radnorshire (1924–1929; 1931–1935)
- Alfred Hall-Davis; MP for Morecambe and Lonsdale (1964–1979)
- Frederick Halsey; MP for Hertfordshire (1874–1885) and Watford (1885–1906)
- Sir Archie Hamilton; MP for Epsom and Ewell (1978–2001)
- Lord Claud Hamilton; MP for Londonderry City (1865–1868), King's Lynn (1869–1880), Liverpool (1880–1885), Liverpool West Derby (1885–1888) and Kensington South (1910–1918)
- Sir George Hamilton, 1st Baronet; MP for Altrincham (1910–1923) and Ilford (1928–1937)
- Lord George Hamilton
- George Alexander Hamilton
- Sir James Hamilton, 2nd Baronet; MP for Sudbury (1837)
- Michael Hamilton
- Neil Hamilton; MP for Tatton (1983–1997)
- Edward Bruce Hamley
- Philip Hammond; MP for Runnymede and Weybridge (1997–2019)
- Stephen Hammond; MP for Wimbledon (2005–2019; 2019–2024)
- Keith Hampson
- Robert William Hanbury; MP for Tamworth (1872–1878), Staffordshire North (1878–1880) and Preston (1885–1903)
- Matt Hancock; MP for West Suffolk (2010–2024)
- Henry Handcock; MP for Athlone (1856–1857)
- Greg Hands; MP for Hammersmith and Fulham (2005–2010) and Chelsea and Fulham (2010–2024)
- Jeremy Hanley; MP for Richmond and Barnes (1983–1997)
- Ian Hannah
- John Hannam
- Sir Charles Hanson, 1st Baronet
- Reginald Hanson
- Granville Harcourt-Vernon; MP for East Retford (1837–1847)
- Sir John Hardy, 1st Baronet; MP for Midhurst (1859), Dartmouth (1860–1868) and Warwickshire South (1868–1874)
- John Hare, 1st Viscount Blakenham
- Andrew Hargreaves
- Ken Hargreaves
- Esmond Harmsworth, 2nd Viscount Rothermere
- Mark Harper; MP for Forest of Dean (2005–2024)
- Richard Harrington; MP for Watford (2010–2019; 2019)
- David Harris; MP for St Ives (1983–1997)
- Fred Harris; MP for Croydon (1948–1970)
- Rebecca Harris; MP for Castle Point (2010–present)
- Frederick Rutherfoord Harris
- Reader Harris
- Brian Harrison; MP for Maldon (1955–1974)
- Harwood Harrison
- Trudy Harrison; MP for Copeland (2017–2024)
- Sally-Ann Hart; MP for Hastings and Rye (2019–2024)
- Simon Hart; MP for Carmarthen West and South Pembrokeshire (2010–2024)
- William Hart Dyke
- Arthur Vere Harvey; MP for Macclesfield (1945–1971)
- Ian Harvey; MP for Harrow East (1950–1959)
- John Harvey; MP for Walthamstow East (1955–1966)
- Robert Harvey; MP for Clwyd South West (1983–1987)
- Betty Harvie Anderson; MP for East Renfrewshire (1959–1979)
- Sir Alan Haselhurst; MP for Middleton and Prestwich (1970–1974) and Saffron Walden (1977–2017)
- Michael Dobbyn Hassard
- Stephen Hastings
- George Hathaway-Eady; MP for Bradford Central (1931–1935)
- Michael Havers, Baron Havers
- Christopher Hawkins; MP for High Peak (1983–1992)
- Nick Hawkins; MP for Blackpool South (1992–1997) and Surrey Heath (1997–2005)
- Sir Paul Hawkins; MP for South West Norfolk (1964–1987)
- Warren Hawksley
- John Hay; MP for Henley (1950–1974)
- Sir Edmund Samuel Hayes, 3rd Baronet; MP for County Donegal (1834–1860)
- Jerry Hayes; MP for Harlow (1983–1997)
- Sir John Hayes; MP for South Holland and The Deepings (1997–present)
- Barney Hayhoe, Baron Hayhoe
- Robert Hayward
- Antony Head, 1st Viscount Head
- Cuthbert Headlam
- Lionel Heald
- Sir Oliver Heald; MP for North Hertfordshire (1992–1997) and North East Hertfordshire (1997–2024)
- James Heappey; MP for Wells (2015–2024)
- Arthur Raymond Heath; MP for Louth, Lincolnshire (1886–1892)
- **Sir Edward Heath**; MP for Bexley (1950–1974), Sidcup (1974–1983) and Old Bexley and Sidcup (1983–2001)
- Sir James Heath, 1st Baronet
- Sir William Heathcote, 5th Baronet
- David Heathcoat-Amory; MP for Wells (1983–2010)
- Derick Heathcoat Amory
- Gilbert Heathcote-Drummond-Willoughby, 2nd Earl of Ancaster
- Gilbert Heathcote-Drummond-Willoughby, 3rd Earl of Ancaster
- Sir John Henniker Heaton; MP for Canterbury (1885–1910)
- Chris Heaton-Harris; MP for Daventry (2010–2024)
- Peter Heaton-Jones; MP for North Devon (2015–2019)
- John Heddle
- Augustus Helder; MP for Whitehaven (1895–1906)
- Sir Alexander Henderson, 1st Baronet; MP for West Staffordshire (1898–1906) and St George's, Hanover Square (1913–1916)
- Barry Henderson; MP for East Dunbartonshire (1974), East Fife (1979–1983) and North East Fife (1983–1987)
- Gordon Henderson; MP for Sittingbourne and Sheppey (2010–2024)
- Harold Henderson; MP for Abingdon (1910–1916)
- Sir John Henderson; MP for Glasgow Cathcart (1946–1964)
- Sir James Henderson-Stewart, 1st Baronet
- Charles Hendry; MP for High Peak (1992–1997) and Wealden (2001–2015)
- Forbes Hendry
- Sir Arthur Heneage; MP for Louth, Lincolnshire (1924–1945)
- Joseph Warner Henley
- Sydney Herbert Holcroft Henn
- George Hennessy, 1st Baron Windlesham
- John Pope Hennessy; MP for King's County (1859–1865)
- John Henniker-Major, 5th Baron Henniker
- Darren Henry; MP for Broxtowe (2019–2024)
- Charles Hepburn-Stuart-Forbes-Trefusis, 20th Baron Clinton
- Joseph Hepworth
- Aubrey Herbert
- Dennis Herbert, 1st Baron Hemingford
- George Herbert; MP for Rotherham (1931–1933)
- John Arthur Herbert
- Nick Herbert; MP for Arundel and South Downs (2005–2019)
- Sidney Herbert; MP for South Wiltshire (1834–1846)
- Sir Sidney Herbert, 1st Baronet
- Edward Hermon
- John Charles Herries
- Michael Heseltine; MP for Tavistock (1966–1974) and Henley (1974–2001)
- Sir Peter Hesketh-Fleetwood, 1st Baronet; MP for Preston (1834–1837)
- Sir Frederick Heygate, 2nd Baronet; MP for Londonderry (1865–1874)
- William Unwin Heygate; MP for Leicester (1861–1865) and South Leicestershire (1870–1880)
- Richard Hickmet
- Maureen Hicks; MP for Wolverhampton North East (1987–1992)
- Sir Robert Hicks; MP for Bodmin (1970–1974; 1974–1983) and South East Cornwall (1983–1997)
- Sir Michael Hicks Beach, 8th Baronet; MP for East Gloucestershire (1854)
- Sir Michael Hicks Beach, 9th Baronet; MP for East Gloucestershire (1864–1885) and Bristol West (1885–1906)
- Michael Hicks Beach, 2nd Viscount Quenington; MP for Tewkesbury (1906–1916)
- William Whitehead Hicks Beach; MP for Cheltenham (1950–1964)
- William Frederick Hicks-Beach; MP for Tewkesbury (1916–1918)
- Antony Higginbotham; MP for Burnley (2019–2024)
- Terence Higgins, Baron Higgins
- Joseph Hiley
- Alexander Staveley Hill
- Charles Hill, Baron Hill of Luton
- Eveline Hill
- Sir James Hill; MP for Southampton Test (1970–1974; 1979–1997)
- John Hill; MP for South Norfolk (1955–1974)
- Arthur Hill-Trevor, 1st Baron Trevor
- Samuel Hill-Wood
- Edward Montagu, 8th Earl of Sandwich
- Ken Hind; MP for West Lancashire (1983–1992)
- Damian Hinds; MP for East Hampshire (2010–present)
- Geoffrey Hirst
- Michael Hirst; MP for Strathkelvin and Bearsden (1983–1987)
- Sir Samuel Hoare, 1st Baronet; MP for Norwich (1886–1906)
- Sir Samuel Hoare, 2nd Baronet; MP for Chelsea (1910–1944)
- Simon Hoare; MP for North Dorset (2015–present)
- Mark Hoban; MP for Fareham (2001–2015)
- Sir John Hobson; MP for Warwick and Leamington (1957–1967)
- Philip Hocking
- Robin Hodgson, Baron Hodgson of Astley Abbotts
- Douglas Hogg; MP for St Marylebone (1922–1928)
- Douglas Hogg; MP for Grantham (1979–1997) and Sleaford and North Hykeham (1997–2010)
- Quintin Hogg; MP for Oxford (1938–1950) and St Marylebone (1963–1970)
- Richard Holden; MP for North West Durham (2019–2024) and Basildon and Billericay (2024–present)
- Sir Arthur Holland; MP for Northampton (1924–1927)
- Henry Holland, 1st Viscount Knutsford
- Philip Holland
- Christopher Holland-Martin
- Sir George Hollingbery; MP for Meon Valley (2010–2019)
- John Hollingworth; MP for Birmingham All Saints (1959–1964)
- Kevin Hollinrake; MP for Thirsk and Malton (2015–present)
- Philip Hollobone; MP for Kettering (2005–2024)
- Adam Holloway; MP for Gravesham (2005–2024)
- Hugh Holmes; MP for Dublin University (1885–1887)
- Paul Holmes; MP for Eastleigh (2019–2024) and Hamble Valley (2024–present)
- Mary Holt
- Richard Holt
- Cornelius Homan
- Tom Hooson; MP for Brecon and Radnorshire (1979–1985)
- James Hope, 1st Baron Rankeillour
- John Augustus Hope
- John Hope-Johnstone; MP for Dumfriesshire (1834–1847; 1857–1865)
- John Hope-Johnstone; MP for Dumfriesshire (1874–1880)
- Alan Hopkins
- Kris Hopkins; MP for Keighley (2010–2017)
- Henry Hopkinson, 1st Baron Colyton
- John Horam; MP for Gateshead West (1970–1983) and Orpington (1992–2010)
- Peter Hordern
- Frank Hornby
- Richard Hornby
- Sir William Hornby, 1st Baronet; MP for Blackburn (1886–1910)
- Robert Horne, 1st Viscount Horne of Slamannan
- Patricia Hornsby-Smith
- Ian Macdonald Horobin
- Florence Horsbrugh, Baroness Horsbrugh
- Thomas Houldsworth; MP for North Nottinghamshire (1834–1852)
- Sir William Houldsworth, 1st Baronet; MP for Manchester (1883–1885) and Manchester North West (1885–1906)
- Donald Howard, 3rd Baron Strathcona and Mount Royal
- Gerald Howard
- Greville Howard; MP for St Ives (1950–1966)
- John Howard; MP for Faversham (1900–1906)
- John Howard; MP for Southampton Test (1955–1964)
- John Morgan Howard; MP for Dulwich (1885–1887)
- Michael Howard; MP for Folkestone and Hythe (1983–2010)
- Charles Howard-Bury; MP for Bilston (1922–1924) and Chelmsford (1926–1931)
- Alan Howarth; MP for Stratford-on-Avon (1983–1995)
- Sir Gerald Howarth; MP for Cannock and Burntwood (1983–1992) and Aldershot (1997–2017)
- Sir Geoffrey Howe; MP for Bebington (1964–1966), Reigate (1970–1974) and East Surrey (1974–1992)
- David Howell, Baron Howell of Guildford
- John Howell; MP for Henley (2008–2024)
- Paul Howell; MP for Sedgefield (2019–2024)
- Ralph Howell
- Ben Howlett; MP for Bath (2015–2017)
- Sir James Hozier, 2nd Baronet; MP for South Lanarkshire (1886–1906)
- Peter Hubbard-Miles
- John Walter Huddleston
- Nigel Huddleston; MP for Mid Worcestershire (2015–2024) and Droitwich and Evesham (2024–present)
- Austen Hudson
- Sir Austin Hudson, 1st Baronet
- Neil Hudson; MP for Penrith and The Border (2019–2024) and Epping Forest (2024–present)
- Robert Hudson, 1st Viscount Hudson
- Eddie Hughes; MP for Walsall North (2017–2024)
- Robert Gurth Hughes
- John Hughes-Hallett
- Michael Hughes-Young, 1st Baron St Helens
- Norman Hulbert
- William Hume-Williams
- Henry Hunloke; MP for West Derbyshire (1938–1944)
- David Hunt; MP for Wirral (1976–1983) and Wirral West (1983–1997)
- George Ward Hunt; MP for North Northamptonshire (1857–1877)
- Jane Hunt; MP for Loughborough (2019–2024)
- Jeremy Hunt; MP for South West Surrey (2005–2024) and Godalming and Ash (2024–present)
- Sir John Hunt; MP for Bromley (1964–1974) and Ravensbourne (1974–1997)
- Rowland Hunt; MP for Ludlow (1903–1917; 1917–1918)
- Tom Hunt; MP for Ipswich (2019–2024)
- Andrew Hunter; MP for Basingstoke (1983–2002)
- Aylmer Hunter-Weston
- Sir Herbert Huntington-Whiteley, 1st Baronet; MP for Ashton-under-Lyne (1895–1906) and Droitwich (1916–1918)
- Sir Anthony Hurd; MP for Mid Oxfordshire (1974–1983) and Witney (1983–1997)
- Douglas Hurd; MP for Newbury (1945–1964)
- Nick Hurd; MP for Ruislip-Northwood (2005–2010) and Ruislip, Northwood and Pinner (2010–2019)
- Geoffrey Hutchinson, Baron Ilford
- Michael Clark Hutchison
- Sir Harry Hylton-Foster; MP for York (1950–1959) and Cities of London and Westminster (1959)

=== I ===
- Edward Iliffe; MP for Tamworth (1923–1929)
- Sir Robert Inglis, 2nd Baronet; MP for Oxford University (1835–1854)
- Thomas Inskip; MP for Bristol Central (1918–1929) and Fareham (1931–1939)
- Thomas James Ireland; MP for Bewdley (1847–1848)
- Thomas Iremonger; MP for Ilford North (1954–1974)
- Sir Godman Irvine; MP for Rye (1955–1983)
- Michael Irvine; MP for Ipswich (1987–1992)
- Sir Charles Irving; MP for Cheltenham (1974–1992)

=== J ===
- Alister Jack; MP for Dumfries and Galloway (2017–2024)
- Michael Jack; MP for Fylde (1987–2010)
- Sir John Jackson; MP for Devonport (1910–1918)
- John Jackson; MP for South East Derbyshire (1959–1964)
- Joseph Devonsher Jackson; MP for Bandon (1835–1842) and Dublin University (1842)
- Robert Jackson; MP for Wantage (1983–2005)
- Sir Stanley Jackson; MP for Howdenshire (1915–1926)
- Stewart Jackson; MP for Peterborough (2005–2017)
- William Jackson; MP for Leeds (1880–1885) and Leeds North (1885–1902)
- Sir Archibald James; MP for Wellingborough (1931–1945)
- David James; MP for Brighton Kemptown (1959–1964) and North Dorset (1970–1979)
- Margot James; MP for Stourbridge (2010–2019; 2019)
- Tim Janman; MP for Thurrock (1987–1992)
- Sir Weston Jarvis; MP for King's Lynn (1886–1892)
- Sajid Javid; MP for Bromsgrove (2010–2024)
- Ranil Jayawardena; MP for North East Hampshire (2015–2024)
- Arthur Frederick Jeffreys; MP for Basingstoke (1887–1906)
- George Jeffreys; MP for Petersfield (1941–1951)
- William Jellett; MP for Dublin University (1919–1922)
- Sir Bernard Jenkin; MP for Colchester North (1992–1997), North Essex (1997–2010) and Harwich and North Essex (2010–present)
- Patrick Jenkin; MP for Wanstead and Woodford (1964–1987)
- Robert Jenkins; MP for Dulwich (1951–1964)
- Mark Jenkinson; MP for Workington (2019–2024)
- Andrea Jenkyns; MP for Morley and Outwood (2015–2024)
- John Jennings; MP for Burton (1955–1974)
- Sir Roland Jennings; MP for Sedgefield (1931–1935) and Sheffield Hallam (1939–1959)
- Robert Jenrick; MP for Newark (2014–2026)
- Alfred Jephcott; MP for Birmingham Yardley (1918–1929)
- Toby Jessel; MP for Twickenham (1970–1997)
- Sir Neville Jodrell; MP for Mid Norfolk (1918) and King's Lynn (1918–1923)
- Dudley Joel; MP for Dudley (1931–1941)
- **Boris Johnson**; MP for Henley (2001–2008) and Uxbridge and South Ruislip (2015–2023)
- Caroline Johnson; MP for Sleaford and North Hykeham (2016–present)
- Donald Johnson; MP for Carlisle (1955–1964)
- Eric Johnson; MP for Manchester Blackley (1951–1964)
- Gareth Johnson; MP for Dartford (2010–2024)
- Jo Johnson; MP for Orpington (2010–2019)
- William Gillilan Johnson; MP for Belfast (1841–1842)
- Sir Geoffrey Johnson-Smith; MP for Holborn and St Pancras South (1959–1964), East Grinstead (1965–1983) and Wealden (1983–2001)
- David Johnston; MP for Wantage (2019–2024)
- William Johnston; MP for Belfast South (1885–1902)
- Hedworth Jolliffe, 2nd Baronet; MP for Wells (1855–1868)
- Hylton Jolliffe, 3rd Baronet; MP for Wells (1895–1899)
- Sir William Jolliffe, 1st Baronet; MP for Petersfield (1837–1838; 1841–1866)
- William Sydney Hylton Jolliffe; MP for Petersfield (1874–1880)
- Andrew Jones; MP for Harrogate and Knaresborough (2010–2024)
- Arthur Jones; MP for Northamptonshire South (1962–1974) and Daventry (1974–1979)
- Aubrey Jones; MP for Birmingham Hall Green (1950–1965)
- David Jones; MP for Clwyd West (2005–2024)
- Fay Jones; MP for Brecon and Radnorshire (2019–2024)
- Gwilym Jones; MP for Cardiff North (1983–1997)
- Marcus Jones; MP for Nuneaton (2010–2024)
- Robert Jones; MP for West Hertfordshire (1983–1997)
- Michael Jopling; MP for Westmorland (1964–1983) and Westmorland and Lonsdale (1983–1997)
- Lincoln Jopp; MP for Spelthorne (2024–present)
- Sir Keith Joseph, 2nd Baronet; MP for Leeds North East (1956–1987)
- Sir Lancelot Joynson-Hicks, 1st Baronet; MP for Chichester (1942–1958)
- Sir William Joynson-Hicks, 1st Baronet; MP for Manchester North West (1908–1910), Brentford (1911–1918) and Twickenham (1918–1929)
- Simon Jupp; MP for East Devon (2019–2024)

=== K ===
- Sir Donald Kaberry, 1st Baronet; MP for Leeds North West (1950–1983)
- Arthur MacMurrough Kavanagh; MP for County Wexford (1866–1868) and County Carlow (1868–1880)
- Thomas Kavanagh; MP for County Carlow (1835; 1835–1837)
- Daniel Kawczynski; MP for Shrewsbury and Atcham (2005–2024)
- Alicia Kearns; MP for Rutland and Melton (2019–2024) and Rutland and Stamford (2024–present)
- John Hodson Kearsley; MP for Wigan (1835–1837)
- Gillian Keegan; MP for Chichester (2017–2024)
- Sir Edward Keeling; MP for Twickenham (1935–1954)
- Dame Elaine Kellett-Bowman; MP for Lancaster (1970–1997)
- Sir Frederic Kelley; MP for Rotherham (1918–1923)
- Chris Kelly; MP for Dudley South (2010–2015)
- Sir Fitzroy Kelly; MP for Ipswich (1835; 1838–1841), Cambridge (1843–1847), Harwich (1852) and East Suffolk (1852–1866)
- Sir John Kennaway, 3rd Baronet; MP for East Devon (1870–1885) and Honiton (1885–1910)
- Seema Kennedy; MP for South Ribble (2015–2019)
- William Keown-Boyd; MP for Downpatrick (1867–1874)
- David Guardi Ker; MP for Downpatrick (1835–1841)
- David Stewart Ker; MP for Downpatrick (1841–1847; 1859–1867) and Down (1852–1857)
- Richard Ker; MP for Down (1884–1885) and East Down (1885–1890)
- John Kerans; MP for The Hartlepools (1959–1964)
- Henry Kerby; MP for Arundel and Shoreham (1954–1971)
- Sir Hamilton Kerr, 1st Baronet; MP for Oldham (1931–1945) and Cambridge (1950–1966)
- Michael Kerr, 13th Marquess of Lothian; MP for Berwick and East Lothian (1974), Edinburgh South (1979–1987) and Devizes (1992–2010)
- Stephen Kerr; MP for Stirling (2017–2019)
- Sir Anthony Kershaw; MP for Stroud (1955–1987)
- Robert Key; MP for Salisbury (1983–2010)
- Roger Keys; MP for Portsmouth North (1934–1943)
- Marcus Kimball; MP for Gainsborough (1956–1983)
- Evelyn King; MP for South Dorset (1964–1979)
- John Gilbert King; MP for King's County (1865–1868)
- Roger King; MP for Birmingham Northfield (1983–1992)
- Tom King; MP for Bridgwater (1970–2001)
- William Kingsmill; MP for Yeovil (1945–1951)
- Sir Clement Kinloch-Cooke, 1st Baronet; MP for Devonport (1910–1923) and Cardiff East (1924–1929)
- Joseph Kinsey; MP for Birmingham Perry Barr (1970–1974)
- Simon Kirby; MP for Brighton Kemptown (2010–2017)
- Peter Michael Kirk
- Julie Kirkbride; MP for Bromsgrove (1997–2010)
- Timothy Kirkhope; MP for Leeds North East (1987–1997)
- William Kirkpatrick
- Roger Knapman; MP for Stroud (1987–1997)
- Michael Knatchbull, 5th Baron Brabourne
- Herbert Knatchbull-Hugessen
- Angela Knight; MP for Erewash (1992–1997)
- Frederick Knight
- Sir Greg Knight; MP for Derby North (1983–1997) and East Yorkshire (2001–2024)
- Dame Jill Knight; MP for Birmingham Edgbaston (1966–1997)
- Julian Knight; MP for Solihull (2015–2024)
- Kate Kniveton; MP for Burton (2019–2024)
- Michael Knowles
- Sir Alfred Knox; MP for Wycombe (1924–1945)
- Sir David Knox; MP for Leek (1970–1983) and Staffordshire Moorlands (1983–1997)
- Danny Kruger; MP for Devizes (2019–2024) and East Wiltshire (2024–present)
- Kwasi Kwarteng; MP for Spelthorne (2010–2024)
- George Kynoch; MP for Aston Manor (1886–1891)
- George Kynoch; MP for Kincardine and Deeside (1992–1997)

=== L ===
- Dame Eleanor Laing; MP for Epping Forest (1997–2024)
- John Laird; MP for Birkenhead (1861–1874)
- Jacqui Lait; MP for Hastings and Rye (1992–1997) and Beckenham (1997–2010)
- Katie Lam; MP for Weald of Kent (2024–present)
- Sir Joseph Lamb; MP for Stone (1922–1945)
- Anthony Lambton, The Lord Lambton; MP for Berwick-upon-Tweed (1951–1973)
- John Lamont; MP for Berwickshire, Roxburgh and Selkirk (2017–present)
- Norman Lamont; MP for Kingston-upon-Thames (1972–1997)
- Claude Lancaster; MP for Fylde (1938–1950) and South Fylde (1950–1970)
- Mark Lancaster; MP for North East Milton Keynes (2005–2010) and Milton Keynes North (2010–2019)
- David Lane; MP for Cambridge (1967–1976)
- George Lane-Fox; MP for Barkston Ash (1906–1931)
- Ian Lang; MP for Galloway (1979–1983) and Galloway and Upper Nithsdale (1983–1997)
- John Langford-Holt
- Andrew Lansley; MP for South Cambridgeshire (1997–2015)
- Sir Charles Lanyon
- Robert Largan; MP for High Peak (2019–2024)
- Joseph Larmor
- Michael Latham
- Pauline Latham; MP for Mid Derbyshire (2010–2024)
- John Laurie; MP for Barnstaple (1854–1855; 1857–1859)
- Sir Alfred Law; MP for Rochdale (1918–1922) and High Peak (1929–1939)
- **Bonar Law**; MP for Glasgow Blackfriars and Hutchesontown (1900–1906), Dulwich (1906–1910), Bootle (1911–1918) and Glasgow Central (1918–1923)
- Richard Law; MP for Kingston upon Hull South West (1931–1945), Kensington South (1945–1950) and Haltemprice (1950–1954)
- Geoffrey Lawler; MP for Bradford North (1983–1987)
- Sir Ivan Lawrence; MP for Burton (1974–1997)
- Nigel Lawson; MP for Blaby (1974–1992)
- Dame Andrea Leadsom; MP for South Northamptonshire (2010–2024)
- Edwin Leather; MP for North Somerset (1950–1964)
- Tony Leavey; MP for Heywood and Royton (1955–1964)
- Gilmour Leburn; MP for Kinross and West Perthshire (1955–1963)
- Jessica Lee; MP for Erewash (2010–2015)
- John Lee; MP for Nelson and Colne (1979–1983) and Pendle (1983–1992)
- Phillip Lee; MP for Bracknell (2010–2019)
- Sir Elliott Lees, 1st Baronet
- John Lees-Jones
- Anthony Lefroy
- Jeremy Lefroy; MP for Stafford (2010–2019)
- Thomas Langlois Lefroy
- Nicholas Leader; MP for County Cork (1861–1868)
- Barry Legg
- William Legge, 5th Viscount Lewisham
- William Legge, 6th Viscount Lewisham
- William Legge, 7th Viscount Lewisham
- Harry Legge-Bourke
- George Legh
- Peter Legh; MP for Petersfield (1951–1960)
- Sir Edward Leigh; MP for Gainsborough and Horncastle (1983–1997) and Gainsborough (1997–present)
- Egerton Leigh
- Sir Spencer Le Marchant; MP for High Peak (1970–1983)
- Lord Henry Lennox; MP for Chichester (1846–1885)
- Lord William Lennox; MP for King's Lynn (1834–1835)
- Alan Lennox-Boyd
- Mark Lennox-Boyd
- Charlotte Leslie; MP for Bristol North West (2010–2017)
- Sir John Leslie, 1st Baronet
- Sir Jim Lester; MP for Beeston (1974–1983) and Broxtowe (1983–1997)
- Sir Oliver Letwin; MP for West Dorset (1997–2019)
- John Orrell Lever; MP for Galway Borough (1859–1865)
- Ian Levy; MP for Blyth Valley (2019–2024)
- Thomas Levy; MP for Elland (1931–1945)
- Andrew Lewer; MP for Northampton South (2017–2024)
- Brandon Lewis; MP for Great Yarmouth (2010–2024)
- Julian Lewis; MP for New Forest East (1997–2020; 2020–present)
- Sir Kenneth Lewis; MP for Rutland and Stamford (1959–1983) and Stamford and Spalding (1983–1987)
- Ian Liddell-Grainger; MP for Bridgwater (2001–2010) and Bridgwater and West Somerset (2010–2024)
- Sir David Lidington; MP for Aylesbury (1992–2019)
- Sir David Lightbown; MP for South East Staffordshire (1983–1995)
- Frank Lilley
- Peter Lilley; MP for St Albans (1983–1997) and Hitchin and Harpenden (1997–2017)
- David Lindsay, 27th Earl of Crawford
- James Louis Lindsay
- Sir Martin Lindsay, 1st Baronet
- Noel Ker Lindsay
- Robert Lindsay
- Hugh Linstead
- John Litchfield; MP for Chelsea (1959–1966)
- John Jestyn Llewellin, 1st Baron Llewellin
- David Llewellyn
- Evan Henry Llewellyn
- Geoffrey William Lloyd
- George Lloyd, 1st Baron Lloyd
- Sir Ian Lloyd
- Sir Peter Lloyd; MP for Fareham (1979–2001)
- Selwyn Lloyd; MP for Wirral (1945–1971)
- Godfrey Locker-Lampson
- Oliver Locker-Lampson
- John Cutts Lockwood
- Chris Loder; MP for West Dorset (2019–2024)
- John Loder, 2nd Baron Wakehurst
- Mark Logan; MP for Bolton North East (2019–2024)
- Richard Long, 3rd Viscount Long
- Walter Long, 1st Viscount Long
- Charles Longbottom
- Gilbert Longden
- Marco Longhi; MP for Dudley North (2019–2024)
- Henry Longhurst
- Richard Longfield; MP for County Cork (1835–1837)
- Robert Longfield; MP for Mallow (1859–1865)
- Julia Lopez; MP for Hornchurch and Upminster (2017–present)
- Jack Lopresti; MP for Filton and Bradley Stoke (2010–2024)
- Jonathan Lord; MP for Woking (2010–2024)
- Sir Michael Lord; MP for Suffolk Central (1983–1997) and Central Suffolk and North Ipswich (1997–2010)
- Tim Loughton; MP for East Worthing and Shoreham (1997–2024)
- Sir John Loveridge; MP for Hornchurch (1970–1974) and Upminster (1974–1983)
- Walter Loveys; MP for Chichester (1958–1969)
- Toby Low, 1st Baron Aldington
- Sir Francis Lowe, 1st Baronet
- Henry Thomas Lowry-Corry
- Sir Cecil Lowther
- Christopher Lowther
- Claude Lowther
- Henry Lowther, 3rd Earl of Lonsdale
- Henry Lowther
- James Lowther; MP for York (1865–1880), North Lincolnshire (1881–1885) and Isle of Thanet (1888–1904)
- James Lowther, 1st Viscount Ullswater
- William Lowther
- Archie Loyd; MP for Abingdon (1895–1906; 1916–1918)
- Arthur Loyd; MP for Abingdon (1921–1923)
- Robert Loyd-Lindsay, 1st Baron Wantage
- Sir Jocelyn Lucas, 4th Baronet; MP for Portsmouth South (1939–1966)
- Percy Lucas; MP for Brentford and Chiswick (1950–1959)
- William Lucas-Shadwell; MP for Hastings (1895–1900)
- Hugh Lucas-Tooth
- Richard Luce
- Richard Luce
- Sir Peter Luff; MP for Worcester (1992–1997) and Mid Worcestershire (1997–2015)
- Sir Leonard Lyle, 1st Baronet; MP for Stratford West Ham (1918–1922), Epping (1923–1924) and Bournemouth (1940–1945)
- Karen Lumley; MP for Redditch (2010–2017)
- Lawrence Lumley, 11th Earl of Scarbrough
- Douglas Lumsden; MP for Aberdeen South (2026–present)
- Sir Nicholas Lyell; MP for Hemel Hempstead (1979–1983), Mid Bedfordshire (1983–1997) and North East Bedfordshire (1997–2001)
- Frederick Lygon, 6th Earl Beauchamp
- Hugh Lyons-Montgomery
- Oliver Lyttelton, 1st Viscount Chandos
- John Lyttelton, 9th Viscount Cobham

=== M ===
- Sir Charles MacAndrew; MP for Kilmarnock (1924–1929), Glasgow Partick (1931–1935) and Bute and Northern Ayrshire (1935–1959)
- Ian MacArthur; MP for Perth and East Perthshire (1959–1974)
- Sir Peter Macdonald; MP for Isle of Wight (1924–1959)
- Sir David Macfarlane; MP for Sutton and Cheam (1974–1992)
- John MacGregor; MP for South Norfolk (1974–2001)
- Andrew MacKay; MP for Birmingham Stechford (1977–1979), East Berkshire (1983–1997) and Bracknell (1997–2010)
- William Forbes Mackenzie; MP for Peeblesshire (1837–1852) and Liverpool (1852–1853)
- Craig Mackinlay; MP for South Thanet (2015–2024)
- David Mackintosh; MP for Northampton South (2015–2017)
- Cherilyn Mackrory; MP for Truro and Falmouth (2019–2024)
- John Maclay, 1st Viscount Muirshiel
- David Maclean; MP for Penrith and The Border (1983–2010)
- Sir Fitzroy Maclean, 1st Baronet; MP for Lancaster (1941–1959) and Bute and Northern Ayrshire (1959–1974)
- Rachel Maclean; MP for Redditch (2017–2024)
- Billy McLean; MP for Inverness (1954–1964)
- Iain Macleod; MP for Enfield West (1950–1970)
- Sir John MacLeod; MP for Ross and Cromarty (1951–1964)
- Mary Macleod; MP for Brentford and Isleworth (2010–2015)
- Sir Donald Macmaster, 1st Baronet; MP for Chertsey (1910–1922)
- **Harold Macmillan**; MP for Stockton-on-Tees (1924–1929; 1931–1945) and Bromley (1945–1964)
- Maurice Macmillan, 1st Viscount Macmillan of Ovenden; MP for Halifax (1955–1964), Farnham (1966–1983) and South West Surrey (1983–1984)
- Edward Macnaghten, Baron Macnaghten
- Niall Macpherson, 1st Baron Drumalbyn
- Frederick Alexander Macquisten; MP for Glasgow Springburn (1918–1922) and Argyllshire (1924–1940)
- Sir Mark MacTaggart-Stewart, 1st Baronet; MP for Wigtown Burghs (1874–1880; 1880) and Kirkcudbrightshire (1885–1906; 1910)
- Martin Maddan
- Dodgson Hamilton Madden
- Sir David Madel; MP for South Bedfordshire (1970–1983) and South West Bedfordshire (1983–2001)
- Anne Main; MP for St Albans (2005–2019)
- Sir Adam Maitland; MP for Faversham (1928–1945)
- Lady Olga Maitland
- Patrick Maitland, 17th Earl of Lauderdale
- **John Major**; MP for Huntingdonshire (1979–1983) and Huntingdon (1983–2001)
- Alan Mak; MP for Havant (2015–present)
- Sir Ian Malcolm; MP for Stowmarket (1895–1906), Croydon (1910–1918) and Croydon South (1918–1919)
- Humfrey Malins; MP for Croydon North West (1983–1992) and Woking (1997–2010)
- Gerry Malone; MP for Aberdeen South (1983–1987) and Winchester (1992–1997)
- Kit Malthouse; MP for North West Hampshire (2015–present)
- Anthony Mangnall; MP for Totnes (2019–2024)
- Scott Mann; MP for North Cornwall (2015–2024)
- Lord John Manners; MP for Newark (1841–1847), Colchester (1850–1857), Leicestershire North (1857–1885) and Melton (1885–1888)
- John Manners-Sutton; MP for Cambridge (1839–1840; 1841–1847)
- John Manners-Sutton; MP for Newark (1847–1857)
- Reginald Manningham-Buller, 1st Viscount Dilhorne
- Keith Mans
- John Maples; MP for Lewisham West (1983–1992) and Stratford-on-Avon (1997–2010)
- David Margesson, 1st Viscount Margesson
- Edward Marjoribanks; MP for Eastbourne (1929–1932)
- Frank Markham
- Paul Marland
- Antony Marlow
- Anthony Marlowe
- Ernest Marples; MP for Wallasey (1945–1974)
- Douglas Marshall
- John Leslie Marshall
- Sir Michael Marshall; MP for Arundel (1974–1997)
- Edward Marshall-Hall
- Julie Marson; MP for Hertford and Stortford (2019–2024)
- Sir Neil Marten; MP for Banbury (1959–1983)
- Glyn Mason, 2nd Baron Blackford
- William Massey-Mainwaring
- Paul Masterton; MP for East Renfrewshire (2017–2019)
- David Martin; MP for Portsmouth South (1987–1997)
- Michael Mates; MP for Petersfield (1974–1983) and East Hampshire (1983–2010)
- Tania Mathias; MP for Twickenham (2015–2017)
- Carol Mather
- George Benvenuto Mathew
- Robert Mathew
- Gordon Matthews; MP for Meriden (1959–1964)
- Angus Maude
- Francis Maude; MP for North Warwickshire (1983–1992) and Horsham (1997–2015)
- Reginald Maudling; MP for Barnet (1950–1974) and Chipping Barnet (1974–1979)
- Ray Mawby; MP for Totnes (1955–1983)
- Brian Mawhinney; MP for Peterborough (1979–1997) and North West Cambridgeshire (1997–2005)
- David Maxwell Fyfe, 1st Earl of Kilmuir
- Herbert Maxwell
- Somerset Arthur Maxwell
- Sir Robin Maxwell-Hyslop; MP for Tiverton (1960–1992)
- **Theresa May**; MP for Maidenhead (1997–2024)
- Lynch Maydon; MP for Wells (1951–1970)
- Jerome Mayhew; MP for Broadland (2019–2024) and Broadland and Fakenham (2024–present)
- Sir Patrick Mayhew; MP for Tunbridge Wells (1974–1997)
- Paul Maynard; MP for Blackpool North and Cleveleys (2010–2024)
- Stephen McAdden
- Sir Duncan McCallum; MP for Argyllshire (1940–1950) and Argyll (1950–1958)
- Hugh McCallmont; MP for Antrim North (1895–1899)
- James McCallmont; MP for Antrim East (1885–1913)
- Jason McCartney; MP for Colne Valley (2010–2017; 2019–2024)
- Karl McCartney; MP for Lincoln (2010–2017; 2019–2024)
- John McClintock; MP for County Louth (1857–1859)
- William McClintock-Bunbury; MP for County Carlow (1846–1852; 1853–1862)
- Malcolm McCorquodale, 1st Baron McCorquodale
- Robert McCrindle
- Anna McCurley
- Angus McDonnell
- James McGarel-Hogg, 1st Baron Magheramorne
- Anne McIntosh; MP for Vale of York (1997–2010) and Thirsk and Malton (2010–2015)
- Martin McLaren
- Billy McLean; MP for Inverness (1954–1964)
- Sir Patrick McLoughlin; MP for West Derbyshire (1986–2010) and Derbyshire Dales (2010–2019)
- Michael McNair-Wilson
- Patrick McNair-Wilson
- Ronald McNeill, 1st Baron Cushendun
- Stephen McPartland; MP for Stevenage (2010–2024)
- Albert McQuarrie
- Esther McVey; MP for Wirral West (2010–2015) and Tatton (2017–present)
- Frank Medlicott
- David Mellor; MP for Putney (1979–1997)
- Sir John Mellor, 2nd Baronet; MP for Tamworth (1935–1945) and Sutton Coldfield (1945–1955)
- Louise Mensch; MP for Corby (2010–2012)
- Mark Menzies; MP for Fylde (2010–2024)
- Johnny Mercer; MP for Plymouth Moor View (2015–2024)
- Patrick Mercer; MP for Newark (2001–2013)
- Piers Merchant; MP for Newcastle upon Tyne Central (1983–1987) and Beckenham (1992–1997)
- Frank Merriman, 1st Baron Merriman
- Huw Merriman; MP for Bexhill and Battle (2015–2024)
- Stephen Metcalfe; MP for South Basildon and East Thurrock (2010–2024)
- Hedworth Meux
- Anthony Meyer
- Frank Cecil Meyer
- Hugo Meynell-Ingram; MP for West Staffordshire (1868–1871)
- Francis Mildmay; MP for Totnes (1912–1922)
- Charles William Miles; MP for Malmesbury (1882–1885)
- John Miles; MP for Bristol (1868)
- Philip John Miles; MP for Bristol (1835–1837)
- Sir Philip Miles, 2nd Baronet; MP for East Somerset (1878–1885)
- Philip William Skinner Miles; MP for Bristol (1837–1852)
- Sir William Miles, 1st Baronet; MP for East Somerset (1834–1865)
- Robin Millar; MP for Aberconwy (2019–2024)
- Hal Miller; MP for Bromsgrove and Redditch (1974–1983) and Bromsgrove (1983–1992)
- Maria Miller; MP for Basingstoke (2005–2024)
- Stephen Milligan; MP for Eastleigh (1992–1994)
- William Milligan, Lord Milligan
- Amanda Milling; MP for Cannock Chase (2015–2024)
- Sir Frederick Mills, 1st Baronet
- Iain Mills
- Nigel Mills; MP for Amber Valley (2010–2024)
- Sir Peter Mills; MP for Torrington (1964–1974), West Devon (1974–1983) and Torridge and West Devon (1983–1987)
- Richard Monckton Milnes, 1st Baron Houghton
- Anne Milton; MP for Guildford (2005–2019)
- Norman Miscampbell
- Andrew Mitchell; MP for Gedling (1987–1997) and Sutton Coldfield (2001–present)
- Colin Mitchell; MP for Aberdeenshire West (1970–1974)
- Sir David Mitchell; MP for Basingstoke (1964–1983) and North West Hampshire (1983–1997)
- William Mitchell-Thomson, 1st Baron Selsdon
- Sir Roger Moate; MP for Faversham (1970–1997)
- Gagan Mohindra; MP for South West Hertfordshire (2019–present)
- Leonard Greenham Star Molloy
- Hugh Molson; MP for Doncaster (1931–1935) and High Peak (1939–1961)
- Francis Monckton
- Walter Monckton, 1st Viscount Monckton of Brenchley
- Henry Mond, 2nd Baron Melchett
- Ernle Money; MP for Ipswich (1970–1974)
- Constance Monks; MP for Chorley (1970–1974)
- Hector Monro, Baron Monro of Langholm
- Lord Robert Montagu
- Victor Montagu
- Lord William Montagu-Douglas-Scott
- Walter Montagu-Douglas-Scott, 8th Duke of Buccleuch
- Anderson Montague-Barlow
- Fergus Montgomery
- Sir William Montgomery-Cuninghame, 9th Baronet; MP for Ayr Burghs (1874–1880)
- Damien Moore; MP for Southport (2017–2024)
- John Moore, Baron Moore of Lower Marsh
- Newton Moore
- Robbie Moore; MP for Keighley (2019–2024) and Keighley and Ilkley (2024–present)
- Stephen Moore
- Sir Thomas Moore, 1st Baronet
- John Moore-Brabazon, 1st Baron Brabazon of Tara
- Penny Mordaunt; MP for Portsmouth North (2010–2024)
- Jasper More
- Adrian Moreing
- Algernon Moreing
- Frederick Courtenay Morgan
- Geraint Morgan
- Nicky Morgan; MP for Loughborough (2010–2019)
- Morgan Morgan-Giles
- Anne Marie Morris; MP for Newton Abbot (2010–2017; 2017–2022; 2022–2024)
- David Morris; MP for Morecambe and Lunesdale (2010–2024)
- James Morris; MP for Halesowen and Rowley Regis (2010–2024)
- Martin Morris; MP for Galway Borough (1900–1901)
- Michael Morris; MP for Galway Borough (1866–1867)
- Michael Morris, Baron Naseby
- Sir Charles Morrison; MP for Devizes (1964–1992)
- Hugh Morrison; MP for Wilton (1918) and Salisbury (1918–1923; 1924–1931)
- John Morrison, 1st Baron Margadale
- Sir Peter Morrison; MP for City of Chester (1974–1992)
- William Morrison; MP for Cirencester and Tewkesbury (1929–1951)
- Sir Clive Morrison-Bell, 1st Baronet; MP for Honiton (1910–1931)
- Joy Morrissey; MP for Beaconsfield (2019–present)
- Jill Mortimer; MP for Hartlepool (2021–2024)
- Wendy Morton; MP for Aldridge-Brownhills (2015–present)
- Sir Oswald Mosley, 6th Baronet; MP for Harrow (1918–1922)
- Stephen Mosley; MP for City of Chester (2010–2015)
- Malcolm Moss; MP for North East Cambridgeshire (1987–2010)
- Charles Mott-Radclyffe
- Sir William Mount, 1st Baronet
- William George Mount
- David Mowat; MP for Warrington South (2010–2017)
- Colin Moynihan
- David Mudd
- Anthony Muirhead
- Henry Mulholland, 2nd Baron Dunleath
- Kieran Mullan; MP for Crewe and Nantwich (2019–2024) and Bexhill and Battle (2024–present)
- Holly Mumby-Croft; MP for Scunthorpe (2019–2024)
- David Mundell; MP for Dumfriesshire, Clydesdale and Tweeddale (2005–present)
- Christopher Murphy
- Andrew Murray, 1st Viscount Dunedin
- Sir George Murray; MP for Perthshire (1834–1835)
- Sheryll Murray; MP for South East Cornwall (2010–2024)
- William Murray, 9th Viscount Stormont; MP for Norwich (1834–1837) and Perthshire (1837–1840)
- Hylton Murray-Philipson
- Andrew Murrison; MP for Westbury (2001–2010) and South West Wiltshire (2010–present)
- Oscar Murton, Baron Murton of Lindisfarne
- William Myers; MP for Winchester (1892–1906)
- David Myles

=== N ===
- Sir Gerald Nabarro; MP for Kidderminster (1950–1964) and South Worcestershire (1966–1973)
- Ronald Nall-Cain; MP for Liverpool Wavertree (1931–1934)
- Sir Joseph Napier, 1st Baronet; MP for Dublin University (1848–1858)
- Sir Gerry Neale; MP for North Cornwall (1979–1992)
- Airey Neave; MP for Abingdon (1953–1979)
- Richard Needham, 6th Earl of Kilmorey; MP for Chippenham (1979–1983) and North Wiltshire (1983–1997)
- Sir Bob Neill; MP for Bromley and Chislehurst (2006–2024)
- Anthony Nelson; MP for Chichester (1974–1997)
- Robert Nesbitt; MP for Chislehurst (1922–1924)
- Sir Michael Neubert; MP for Romford (1974–1997)
- Basil Neven-Spence
- Sir Robert Newman, 4th Baronet; MP for Exeter (1918–1927)
- Brooks Newmark; MP for Braintree (2005–2015)
- George Newton, 1st Baron Eltisley
- Sarah Newton; MP for Truro and Falmouth (2010–2019)
- Tony Newton; MP for Braintree (1974–1997)
- John Iltyd Nicholl; MP for Cardiff (1834–1852)
- Sir Harmar Nicholls, 1st Baronet; MP for Peterborough (1950–1974)
- Patrick Nicholls; MP for Teignbridge (1983–2001)
- David Nicholson; MP for Taunton (1987–1997)
- Emma Nicholson; MP for Torridge and West Devon (1987–1995)
- Sir Godfrey Nicholson, 1st Baronet; MP for Morpeth (1931–1935) and Farnham (1937–1966)
- John Sanctuary Nicholson
- Lia Nici; MP for Great Grimsby (2019–2024)
- Nigel Nicolson; MP for Bournemouth East and Christchurch (1952–1959)
- Basil Nield
- Herbert Nield
- Robert Nisbet-Hamilton; MP for Ipswich (1835) and North Lincolnshire (1837–1857)
- Allan Noble
- Michael Noble, Baron Glenkinglas
- Gerard Noel
- Caroline Nokes; MP for Romsey and Southampton North (2010–2019; 2019–present)
- Archie Norman; MP for Tunbridge Wells (1997–2005)
- Jesse Norman; MP for Hereford and South Herefordshire (2010–present)
- Wilfrid Normand, Baron Normand
- Tom Normanton; MP for Cheadle (1970–1987)
- Steven Norris; MP for Oxford East (1983–1987) and Epping Forest (1988–1997)
- Henry Northcote, 1st Baron Northcote
- Sir Stafford Northcote, 8th Baronet
- John Norton-Griffiths
- Sir John Nott; MP for St Ives (1966–1983)
- George Nugent, Baron Nugent of Guildford
- William Nunn; MP for Whitehaven (1931–1935) and Newcastle upon Tyne West (1940–1945)
- David Nuttall; MP for Bury South (2010–2017)
- Anthony Nutting; MP for Melton (1945–1956)

=== O ===
- Sir Hendrie Oakshott, 1st Baronet; MP for Bebington (1950–1964)
- Ben Obese-Jecty; MP for Huntingdon (2024–present)
- Sir Lucius O'Brien, 5th Baronet; MP for County Clare (1847–1852)
- Neil O'Brien; MP for Harborough (2017–2024) and Harborough, Oadby and Wigston (2024–present)
- Sir Stephen O'Brien; MP for Eddisbury (1999–2015)
- Sir Terence O'Connor; MP for Luton (1924–1929) and Nottingham Central (1930–1940)
- George Odey; MP for Howdenshire (1947–1950) and Beverley (1950–1955)
- William O'Donovan; MP for Mile End (1931–1935)
- Matthew Offord; MP for Hendon (2010–2024)
- Gideon Oliphant-Murray; MP for Glasgow St Rollox (1918–1922)
- Eric Ollerenshaw; MP for Lancaster and Fleetwood (2010–2015)
- Sir Charles Oman; MP for Oxford University (1919–1935)
- Robert Torrens O'Neill; MP for Mid Antrim (1885–1910)
- Cranley Onslow; MP for Woking (1964–1997)
- Denzel Onslow; MP for Guildford (1874–1885)
- Phillip Oppenheim; MP for Amber Valley (1983–1997)
- Sally Oppenheim-Barnes; MP for Gloucester (1970–1987)
- Guy Opperman; MP for Hexham (2010–2024)
- Arthur Walsh; MP for Radnorshire (1885–1892)
- Thomas Ormiston; MP for Motherwell (1931–1935)
- David Ormsby-Gore, 5th Baron Harlech
- William Ormsby-Gore, 4th Baron Harlech
- William Ormsby-Gore, 2nd Baron Harlech
- Sir Archibald Orr-Ewing, 1st Baronet; MP for Dunbartonshire (1868–1892)
- Charles Lindsay Orr-Ewing; MP for Ayr Burghs (1895–1904)
- Sir Ian Orr-Ewing; MP for Weston-super-Mare (1934–1958)
- Sir Ian Orr-Ewing, 1st Baronet; MP for Hendon North (1950–1970)
- Sir John Osborn; MP for Sheffield Hallam (1959–1987)
- Sir Cyril Osborne; MP for Louth, Lincolnshire (1945–1969)
- George Osborne; MP for Tatton (2001–2017)
- Sir Richard Ottaway; MP for Nottingham North (1983–1987) and Croydon South (1992–2015)
- William Overend; MP for Pontefract (1859)
- Idris Owen; MP for Stockport North (1970–1974)

=== P ===
- Sir Graham Page; MP for Crosby (1953–1981)
- Sir John Page; MP for Harrow West (1960–1987)
- Richard Page; MP for Workington (1976–1979) and South West Hertfordshire (1979–2005)
- Almeric Paget; MP for Cambridge (1910–1917)
- Sir James Paice; MP for South East Cambridgeshire (1987–2015)
- Sir John Pakington, 1st Baronet; MP for Droitwich (1837–1874)
- Gerald Palmer; MP for Winchester (1935–1945)
- Robert Palmer; MP for Berkshire (1834–1859)
- Roundell Palmer, 1st Earl of Selborne
- Sir Walter Palmer, 1st Baronet
- Norman Pannell; MP for Liverpool Kirkdale (1955–1964)
- Philip Oxenden Papillon; MP for Colchester (1859–1861)
- Neil Parish; MP for Tiverton and Honiton (2010–2022)
- Sir Gilbert Parker, 1st Baronet; MP for Gravesend (1900–1918)
- Cecil Parkinson; MP for Enfield West (1970–1974), South Hertfordshire (1974–1983) and Hertsmere (1983–1992)
- Matthew Parris; MP for West Derbyshire (1979–1986)
- Ernest Partridge; MP for Battersea South (1951–1964)
- Priti Patel; MP for Witham (2010–present)
- Owen Paterson; MP for North Shropshire (1997–2021)
- Sir Irvine Patnick; MP for Sheffield Hallam (1987–1997)
- Chris Patten; MP for Bath (1979–1992)
- John Patten; MP for Oxford (1979–1983) and Oxford West and Abingdon (1983–1997)
- Sir Geoffrey Pattie; MP for Chertsey and Walton (1974–1997)
- George Patton; MP for Bridgwater (1866)
- Rebecca Paul; MP for Reigate (2024–present)
- Jim Pawsey; MP for Rugby (1979–1983) and Rugby and Kenilworth (1979–1983) (1983–1997)
- Mark Pawsey; MP for Rugby (2010–2024)
- Elizabeth Peacock; MP for Batley and Spen (1983–1997)
- Osbert Peake; MP for Leeds North (1929–1955) and Leeds North East (1955–1956)
- Sir Charles Pearson; MP for Edinburgh and St Andrews Universities (1843–1910)
- Francis Pearson
- Herbert Pease, 1st Baron Daryngton
- William Edwin Pease
- Charles Peat
- Sir John Peel; MP for Leicester South East (1957–1974)
- **Sir Robert Peel, 2nd Baronet**; MP for Tamworth (1834–1846)
- Andrew Pelling; MP for Croydon Central (2005–2007)
- Lewis Pelly
- Mike Penning; MP for Hemel Hempstead (2005–2024)
- Frederick Penny, 1st Viscount Marchwood
- John Penrose; MP for Weston-super-Mare (2005–2024)
- Frederick Thomas Penton
- Ian Percival
- Andrew Percy; MP for Brigg and Goole (2010–2024)
- Eustace Percy, 1st Baron Percy of Newcastle
- Lord Henry Percy
- Lord Algernon Percy
- Algernon Percy, 4th Lord Lovaine
- Walter Frank Perkins; MP for New Forest (1910–1918) and New Forest and Christchurch (1918–1922)
- Claire Perry; MP for Devizes (2010–2019)
- Maurice Petherick
- Sir Basil Peto, 1st Baronet; MP for Devizes (1910–1918) and Barnstaple (1920–1923; 1924–1928; 1928–1935)
- Basil Arthur John Peto
- Christopher Peto
- Geoffrey Peto
- John Peyton, Baron Peyton of Yeovil
- Mabel Philipson; MP for Berwick-upon-Tweed (1923–1929)
- Stephen Phillips; MP for Sleaford and North Hykeham (2010–2016)
- Chris Philp; MP for Croydon South (2015–present)
- Charles Nicholas Paul Phipps
- Charles Paul Phipps
- John Lewis Phipps
- Pickering Phipps; MP for Northampton (1874–1880) and South Northamptonshire (1881–1885)
- Sir Eric Pickles; MP for Brentwood and Ongar (1992–2017)
- Sir Kenneth Pickthorn, 1st Baronet
- Charles Pierrepont, 4th Earl Manvers
- Mervyn Pike
- Richard Pilkington; MP for Newton (1899–1906)
- Sir Richard Pilkington; MP for Widnes (1935–1945) and Poole (1951–1964)
- Christopher Pincher; MP for Tamworth (2010–2023)
- Bonner Pink
- James Pitman
- Dame Edith Pitt; MP for Birmingham Edgbaston (1953–1966)
- Jacob Pleydell-Bouverie, Viscount Folkestone; MP for Wilton (1892–1900)
- William Pleydell-Bouverie, Viscount Folkestone; MP for South Wiltshire (1874–1885) and Enfield (1885–1889)
- Leonard Plugge
- John Pemberton Plumptre; MP for East Kent (1835–1852)
- David Plunket; MP for Dublin University (1870–1895)
- John William Plunkett, 17th Baron of Dunsany
- Alexander Pollock; MP for Moray and Nairn (1979–1983) and Moray (1983–1987)
- Ernest Pollock, 1st Viscount Hanworth
- Vere Ponsonby, 9th Earl of Bessborough
- Barry Porter; MP for Bebington and Ellesmere Port (1979–1983) and Wirral South (1983–1996)
- David Porter; MP for Waveney (1987–1997)
- Michael Portillo; MP for Enfield Southgate (1984–1997) and Kensington and Chelsea (1999–2005)
- Percivall Pott; MP for Devizes (1955–1964)
- John Potter; MP for Eccles (1931–1935)
- Dan Poulter; MP for Central Suffolk and North Ipswich (2010–2024)
- Rebecca Pow; MP for Taunton Deane (2015–2024)
- Enoch Powell; MP for Wolverhampton South West (1950–1974)
- William Powell; MP for Corby (1983–1997)
- John Powley
- Winthrop Mackworth Praed; MP for Great Yarmouth (1835–1837) and Aylesbury (1837–1839)
- Reg Prentice; MP for Newham North East (1977–1979) and Daventry (1979–1987)
- Victoria Prentis; MP for Banbury (2015–2024)
- Stanley Prescott
- Sir William Prescott, 1st Baronet
- Sir Walter Preston; MP for Mile End (1918–1923) and Cheltenham (1928–1937)
- Ernest George Pretyman
- Sir David Price; MP for Eastleigh (1955–1992)
- Henry Price; MP for Lewisham West (1950–1964)
- David Price-White
- Henry Prinsep; MP for Harwich (1851)
- David Prior; MP for North Norfolk (1997–2001)
- Jim Prior; MP for Lowestoft (1959–1983) and Waveney (1983–1987)
- Sir Otho Prior-Palmer; MP for Worthing (1945–1964)
- Mark Prisk; MP for Hertford and Stortford (2001–2019)
- Mark Pritchard; MP for The Wrekin (2005–present)
- Henry Procter; MP for Accrington (1931–1945)
- Harvey Proctor; MP for Basildon (1979–1983) and Billericay (1983–1987)
- John Profumo; MP for Kettering (1940–1945) and Stratford-on-Avon (1950–1963)
- Wilf Proudfoot; MP for Cleveland (1959–1964) and Brighouse and Spenborough (1970–1974)
- Tom Pursglove; MP for Corby (2015–2024)
- Francis Pym; MP for Cambridgeshire (1961–1983) and South East Cambridgeshire (1983–1987)
- Leslie Pym; MP for Monmouth (1939–1945)

=== Q ===
- Sir Cuthbert Quilter, 2nd Baronet; MP for Sudbury (1910–1918)
- Jeremy Quin; MP for Horsham (2015–2024)
- Will Quince; MP for Colchester (2015–2024)
- Joan Quennell; MP for Petersfield (1960–1974)

=== R ===
- Dominic Raab; MP for Esher and Walton (2010–2024)
- Keith Raffan; MP for Delyn (1983–1992)
- Henry Cecil Raikes; MP for City of Chester (1868–1880), Preston (1882) and Cambridge University (1882–1891)
- Sir Victor Raikes; MP for South East Essex (1931–1945), Liverpool Wavertree (1945–1950) and Liverpool Garston (1950–1956)
- Sir Timothy Raison; MP for Aylesbury (1970–1992)
- Shivani Raja; MP for Leicester East (2024–present)
- Archibald Maule Ramsay; MP for Peebles and South Midlothian (1931–1945)
- Simon Ramsay; MP for Forfarshire (1945–1950)
- Herwald Ramsbotham, 1st Viscount Soulbury
- Eugene Ramsden, 1st Baron Ramsden
- George Taylor Ramsden; MP for Elland (1918–1922)
- James Ramsden; MP for Harrogate (1954–1974)
- John Randall; MP for Uxbridge (1997–2010) and Uxbridge and South Ruislip (2010–2015)
- Tom Randall; MP for Gedling (2019–2024)
- Jack Rankin; MP for Windsor (2024–present)
- Sir James Rankin, 1st Baronet
- Arthur Ratcliffe; MP for Leek (1931–1935)
- John Rathbone; MP for Bodmin (1935–1940)
- Tim Rathbone; MP for Lewes (1974–1997)
- Nathan Raw; MP for Liverpool Wavertree (1918–1922)
- Peter Rawlinson; MP for Epsom (1955–1974) and Epsom and Ewell (1974–1978)
- Ralph Rayner; MP for Totnes (1935–1955)
- William Morris Reade; MP for Waterford City (1841–1842)
- Mark Reckless; MP for Rochester and Strood (2010–2014)
- Martin Redmayne, Baron Redmayne
- Robert Redmond; MP for Bolton West (1970–1974)
- Sir John Redwood; MP for Wokingham (1987–2024)
- David Reed; MP for Exmouth and Exeter East (2024–present)
- Laurance Reed; MP for Bolton East (1970–1974)
- Sir Stanley Reed; MP for Aylesbury (1938–1950)
- Hugh Rees; MP for Swansea West (1959–1964)
- Sir John Rees, 1st Baronet; MP for Montgomery (1906–1910) and Nottingham East (1912–1922)
- Peter Rees; MP for Dover (1970–1974; 1983–1987) and Dover and Deal (1974–1983)
- William Rees-Davies; MP for Isle of Thanet (1953–1974) and Thanet West (1974–1983)
- Jacob Rees-Mogg; MP for North East Somerset (2010–2024)
- Simon Reevell; MP for Dewsbury (2010–2015)
- James Reid, Baron Reid
- John Reith, 1st Baron Reith
- Peter Remnant; MP for Wokingham (1950–1959)
- David Renton, Baron Renton
- Tim Renton, Baron Renton of Mount Harry
- Sir Gervais Rentoul; MP for Lowestoft (1922–1934)
- Sir James Reynolds, 1st Baronet
- Robert Rhodes James
- Charles Rhys, 8th Baron Dynevor
- Brandon Rhys-Williams
- Sir Frederick Rice; MP for Harwich (1924–1929)
- Walter Rice, 7th Baron Dynevor
- Nicola Richards; MP for West Bromwich East (2019–2024)
- Richard Richards; MP for Merioneth (1836–1852)
- Rod Richards; MP for Clwyd North West (1992–1997)
- Angela Richardson; MP for Guildford (2019–2024)
- Graham Riddick; MP for Colne Valley (1987–1997)
- Matthew Ridley, 1st Viscount Ridley
- Sir Matthew Ridley, 4th Baronet
- Matthew White Ridley, 2nd Viscount Ridley
- Nicholas Ridley, Baron Ridley of Liddesdale
- Samuel Ridley
- Sir Julian Ridsdale; MP for Harwich (1968–1992)
- Sir Malcolm Rifkind; MP for Edinburgh Pentlands (1974–1997), Kensington and Chelsea (2005–2010) and Kensington (2010–2015)
- Geoffrey Rippon; MP for Norwich South (1955–1964) and Hexham (1966–1987)
- Charles Ritchie; MP for Tower Hamlets (1874–1885), St George (1885–1892) and Croydon (1895–1905)
- Sir John Rivett-Carnac, 2nd Baronet; MP for Lymington (1852–1860)
- Andrew Robathan; MP for Blaby (1992–2010) and South Leicestershire (2010–2015)
- Michael Roberts; MP for Cardiff North (1970–1974) and Cardiff North West (1974–1983)
- Sir Peter Roberts, 3rd Baronet; MP for Sheffield Ecclesall (1945–1950) and Sheffield Heeley (1950–1966)
- Rob Roberts; MP for Delyn (2019–2021)
- Sir Wyn Roberts; MP for Conwy (1970–1997)
- Sir David Robertson; MP for Streatham (1939–1950) and Caithness and Sutherland (1950–1959)
- Sir Hugh Robertson; MP for Faversham and Mid Kent (2001–2015)
- James Robertson; MP for Buteshire (1885–1891)
- Joe Robertson; MP for Isle of Wight East (2024–present)
- Laurence Robertson; MP for Tewkesbury (1997–2024)
- Raymond Robertson; MP for Aberdeen South (1992–1997)
- Mary Robinson; MP for Cheadle (2015–2024)
- Roland Robinson, 1st Baron Martonmere
- Thomas Herbert Robertson
- Mark Robinson; MP for Newport West (1983–1987) and Somerton and Frome (1992–1997)
- William Robson Brown
- Rennell Rodd, 1st Baron Rennell
- Sir John Rodgers, 1st Baronet
- Dame Marion Roe; MP for Broxbourne (1983–2005)
- Peter Rolt; MP for Greenwich (1852–1857)
- William Roots; MP for Kensington South (1959–1968)
- Sir Harold Roper; MP for North Cornwall (1950–1959)
- Leonard Ropner
- Andrew Rosindell; MP for Romford (2001–present)
- Douglas Ross; MP for Moray (2017–2024)
- Sir Hugh Rossi; MP for Hornsey (1966–1983) and Hornsey and Wood Green (1983–1992)
- James St Clair-Erskine, 3rd Earl of Rosslyn
- Peter Rost; MP for South East Derbyshire (1970–1983) and Erewash (1983–1992)
- Lionel Nathan de Rothschild
- Henry John Rous
- Andrew Rowe; MP for Mid Kent (1983–1997) and Faversham and Mid Kent (1997–2001)
- Lee Rowley; MP for North East Derbyshire (2017–2024)
- Percy Royds
- Anthony Royle, Baron Fanshawe of Richmond
- Amber Rudd; MP for Hastings and Rye (2010–2019)
- David Ruffley; MP for Bury St Edmunds (1997–2015)
- Francis Rufford; MP for Worcester (1848–1852)
- Edward Ruggles-Brise
- Dame Angela Rumbold; MP for Mitcham and Morden (1982–1997)
- Norah Runge; MP for Rotherhithe (1931–1935)
- Dean Russell; MP for Watford (2019–2024)
- Francis Shirley Russell; MP for Cheltenham (1895–1900)
- Ronald Russell
- Stuart Russell; MP for Darwen (1935–1943)
- Sir Hugo Rutherford, 2nd Baronet
- Sir William Rutherford, 1st Baronet
- David Rutley; MP for Macclesfield (2010–2024)
- Richard Ryder, Baron Ryder of Wensum
- Robert Edward Dudley Ryder

=== S ===
- Tom Sackville; MP for Bolton West (1983–1997)
- Sir Tim Sainsbury; MP for Hove (1973–1997)
- Sir Isidore Salmon; MP for Harrow (1924–1941)
- Sir Edward Salt; MP for Birmingham Yardley (1931–1945)
- Thomas Salt; MP for Stafford (1859–1865; 1869–1880; 1881–1885; 1886–1892)
- Sir Arthur Salter; MP for Oxford University (1937–1950) and Ormskirk (1951–1953)
- Gary Sambrook; MP for Birmingham Northfield (2019–2024)
- Arthur Samuel, 1st Baron Mancroft
- Arthur Samuels
- Joseph Sandars; MP for Great Yarmouth (1848–1852)
- Antoinette Sandbach; MP for Eddisbury (2015–2019)
- Sir Robert Sanders, 1st Baronet; MP for Bridgwater (1910–1923) and Wells (1924–1929)
- Sir Frank Sanderson, 1st Baronet; MP for Darwen (1922–1923; 1924–1929), Ealing (1931–1945) and Ealing East (1945–1950)
- Duncan Sandys; MP for Norwood (1935–1945) and Streatham (1950–1974)
- Laura Sandys; MP for South Thanet (2010–2015)
- Thomas Sandys; MP for Bootle (1885–1911)
- Sir Philip Sassoon, 3rd Baronet
- Edward James Saunderson
- John Savile, 4th Viscount Pollington; MP for Pontefract (1835–1837; 1841–1847)
- Sir Joseph Savory, 1st Baronet; MP for Appleby (1893–1900)
- Selaine Saxby; MP for North Devon (2019–2024)
- Jonathan Sayeed; MP for Bristol East (1983–1992) and Mid Bedfordshire (1997–2005)
- James Yorke Scarlett
- Wentworth Schofield; MP for Rochdale (1951–1957)
- George Sclater-Booth, 1st Baron Basing
- Lee Scott; MP for Ilford North (2005–2015)
- Sir Leslie Scott; MP for Liverpool Exchange (1910–1929)
- Sir Nicholas Scott; MP for Paddington South (1966–1974) and Chelsea (1974–1997)
- Robert Scott
- John Scott, 9th Duke of Buccleuch
- James Scott-Hopkins
- Ronald Scott-Miller
- Paul Scully; MP for Sutton and Cheam (2015–2024)
- Bob Seely; MP for Isle of Wight (2017–2024)
- Andrew Selous; MP for South West Bedfordshire (2001–2024)
- Henry Ker Seymer
- Leslie Seymour
- Grant Shapps; MP for Welwyn Hatfield (2005–2024)
- Alok Sharma; MP for Reading West (2010–2024)
- Richard Sharples; MP for Sutton and Cheam (1954–1972)
- Neil Shastri-Hurst; MP for Solihull West and Shirley (2024–present)
- David Shaw
- Sir Frederick Shaw, 3rd Baronet; MP for Dublin University (1834–1848)
- Giles Shaw
- Michael Shaw, Baron Shaw of Northstead
- Alec Shelbrooke; MP for Elmet and Rothwell (2010–2024) and Wetherby and Easingwold (2024–present)
- William Shelton
- Gillian Shephard; MP for South West Norfolk (1987–2005)
- Colin Shepherd
- Sir Richard Shepherd; MP for Aldridge-Brownhills (1979–1994; 1995–2015)
- William Shepherd
- Michael Shersby; MP for Uxbridge (1972–1997)
- John Joseph Shute
- Colonel Sibthorp
- Philip Sidney, 1st Baron De L'Isle and Dudley
- Thomas Sidney
- William Sidney, 1st Viscount De L'Isle
- Frederick Silvester
- Charles Simeons
- David Simmonds; MP for Ruislip, Northwood and Pinner (2019–present)
- Mark Simmonds; MP for Boston and Skegness (2001–2015)
- Jocelyn Simon, Baron Simon of Glaisdale
- Keith Simpson; MP for Mid Norfolk (1997–2010) and Broadland (2010–2019)
- Sir Roger Sims; MP for Chislehurst (1974–1997)
- George Evelyn Sinclair
- Sir George Sitwell, 4th Baronet
- Trevor Skeet
- Noel Skelton
- Thomas Skewes-Cox
- Chris Skidmore; MP for Kingswood (2010–2024)
- John Slater; MP for Eastbourne (1932–1935)
- Walter Dorling Smiles
- Sir Bracewell Smith; MP for Dulwich (1932–1945)
- Chloe Smith; MP for Norwich North (2009–2024)
- Dudley Smith
- Edward Percy Smith
- Eric Smith
- Frederick Edwin Smith
- Greg Smith; MP for Buckingham (2019–2024) and Mid Buckinghamshire (2024–present)
- Henry Smith; MP for Crawley (2010–2024)
- John Smith
- Julian Smith; MP for Skipton and Ripon (2010–present)
- Rebecca Smith; MP for South West Devon (2024–present)
- Robert Workman Smith
- Royston Smith; MP for Southampton Itchen (2015–2024)
- Tim Smith; MP for Ashfield (1977–1979) and Beaconsfield (1982–1997)
- **Lord Edward Smith-Stanley**; MP for North Lancashire (1837–1844)
- Alfred Waldron Smithers
- Peter Smithers
- Waldron Smithers
- Sir John Smyth, 1st Baronet
- George Smythe, 7th Viscount Strangford
- William McNair Snadden
- Andrew Snowden; MP for Fylde (2024–present)
- Christopher Soames; MP for Bedford (1950–1966)
- Sir Nicholas Soames; MP for Crawley (1983–1997) and Mid Sussex (1997–2019; 2019)
- Amanda Solloway; MP for Derby North (2015–2017; 2019–2024)
- Edward Arthur Somerset
- Henry Somerset, 8th Duke of Beaufort
- Donald Somervell, Baron Somervell of Harrow
- Annesley Somerville
- Joseph Somes; MP for Dartmouth (1844–1845)
- Joseph Somes; MP for Kingston upon Hull (1859–1965)
- Harold Soref
- Thomas Henry Sutton Sotheron-Estcourt; MP for Devizes (1835–1844) and North Wiltshire (1844–1865)
- Anna Soubry; MP for Broxtowe (2010–2019)
- Sir Archibald Southby, 1st Baronet
- Alexander Spearman
- Louis Spears
- Keith Speed
- Sir Rupert Speir; MP for Hexham (1951–1966)
- Antony Speller
- Dame Caroline Spelman; MP for Meriden (1997–2019)
- Henry Spence
- John Spence; MP for Sheffield Heeley (1970–1974), Thirsk and Malton (1974–1983) and Ryedale (1983–1986)
- Ben Spencer; MP for Runnymede and Weybridge (2019–present)
- Sir Derek Spencer; MP for Leicester South (1983–1987) and Brighton Pavilion (1992–1997)
- Sir Mark Spencer; MP for Sherwood (2010–2024)
- Patrick Spencer; MP for Central Suffolk and North Ipswich (2024–present)
- Lord Charles Spencer-Churchill; MP for Woodstock (1835–1837)
- George Spencer-Churchill, Marquess of Blandford; MP for Woodstock (1834–1835; 1838–1840)
- Walter Spencer-Stanhope; MP for West Riding of Yorkshire South (1872–1880)
- Sir Patrick Spens; MP for Ashford (1933–1943) and Kensington South (1950–1959)
- Sir James Spicer; MP for West Dorset (1974–1997)
- Sir Michael Spicer; MP for South Worcestershire (1974–1997) and West Worcestershire (1997–2010)
- Bob Spink; MP for Castle Point (1992–1997; 2001–2008)
- Richard Spooner; MP for Birmingham (1844–1847) and North Warwickshire (1847–1864)
- Richard Spring; MP for Bury St Edmunds (1992–1997) and West Suffolk (1997–2010)
- Iain Sproat
- Alexander Sprot
- Robin Squire
- Nick St Aubyn; MP for Guildford (1997–2001)
- Malcolm St Clair; MP for Bristol South East (1961–1963)
- Norman St John-Stevas, Baron St John of Fawsley
- Alexander Stafford; MP for Rother Valley (2019–2024)
- Augustus Stafford
- Greg Stafford; MP for Farnham and Bordon (2024–present)
- Keith Stainton
- Ivor Stanbrook
- Edward Stanhope
- Albert Stanley, 1st Baron Ashfield
- Arthur Stanley
- Edward Stanley, Lord Stanley
- Frederick Stanley, 16th Earl of Derby
- George Frederick Stanley
- Henry Morton Stanley
- John Stanley; MP for Tonbridge and Malling (1974–2015)
- Oliver Stanley; MP for Westmorland (1924–1945) and Bristol West (1945–1950)
- Richard Stanley
- Lewis Randle Starkey; MP for West Riding of Yorkshire South (1874–1880)
- Arthur Steel-Maitland
- Anthony Steen; MP for South Hams (1983–1997) and Totnes (1997–2010)
- Michael Stephen
- Andrew Stephenson; MP for Pendle (2010–2024)
- Blake Stephenson; MP for Mid Bedfordshire (2024–present)
- Robert Stephenson; MP for Whitby (1847–1859)
- Michael Stern
- Andrew Steuart
- Geoffrey Stevens
- Lewis Stevens
- Marshall Stevens
- Martin Stevens
- Jane Stevenson; MP for Wolverhampton North East (2019–2024)
- John Stevenson; MP for Carlisle (2010–2024)
- Harold Macdonald Steward
- William Steward
- Nairne Stewart Sandeman
- Allan Stewart
- Andy Stewart
- Bob Stewart; MP for Beckenham (2010–2024)
- Iain Stewart; MP for Milton Keynes South (2010–2024)
- Sir Ian Stewart; MP for Hitchin (1974–1983) and North Hertfordshire (1983–1992)
- Rory Stewart; MP for Penrith and The Border (2010–2019)
- John Stewart-Murray, 8th Duke of Atholl; MP for Perthshire West (1910–1917)
- Katharine Stewart-Murray, Duchess of Atholl; MP for Kinross and Western Perthshire (1923–1935; 1935–1937; 1937–1938)
- Geoffrey Stewart-Smith
- John Maxwell Stirling-Maxwell
- Edwin Forsyth Stockton; MP for Manchester Exchange (1922–1923)
- Anthony Stodart, Baron Stodart of Leaston
- Malcolm Stoddart-Scott
- John Heydon Stokes
- John Benjamin Stone
- Samuel Storey, Baron Buckton
- Samuel Storey
- William Henry Stott
- John Stradling Thomas
- Henry Strauss, 1st Baron Conesford
- Gary Streeter; MP for Plymouth Sutton (1992–1997) and South West Devon (1997–2024)
- Gerald Strickland, 1st Baron Strickland
- Mel Stride; MP for Central Devon (2010–present)
- Arthur Stuart, 7th Viscount Stewart
- Graham Stuart; MP for Beverley and Holderness (2005–present)
- James Stuart, 1st Viscount Stuart of Findhorn
- Charles Beilby Stuart-Wortley, 1st Baron Stuart of Wortley
- Henry Studholme
- Julian Sturdy; MP for York Outer (2010–2024)
- Thomas Stuttaford; MP for Norwich South (1970–1974)
- Murray Sueter
- Edward Sugden, 1st Baron St Leonards
- Wilfrid Sugden
- David Sumberg
- Spencer Summers
- Hugo Summerson; MP for Walthamstow (1987–1992)
- Donald Sumner; MP for Orpington (1955–1962)
- **Rishi Sunak**; MP for Richmond (Yorks) (2015–2024) and Richmond and Northallerton (2024–present)
- James Sunderland; MP for Bracknell (2019–2024)
- Sir Harold Sutcliffe; MP for Royton (1931–1950) and Heywood and Royton (1950–1955)
- John Sutcliffe; MP for Middlesbrough West (1970–1974)
- Sir Desmond Swayne; MP for New Forest West (1997–present)
- Walter Sweeney; MP for Vale of Glamorgan (1992–1997)
- Sir Hugo Swire; MP for East Devon (2001–2019)
- Sir Frederick Sykes; MP for Sheffield Hallam (1922–1928) and Nottingham Central (1940–1945)
- John Sykes; MP for Scarborough (1992–1997)
- Sir Mark Sykes, 6th Baronet; MP for Kingston upon Hull Central (1911–1919)
- Sir Robert Syms; MP for Poole (1997–2024)

=== T ===
- John Ellis Talbot; MP for Brierley Hill (1959–1967)
- William Ellison-Macartney; MP for Antrim South (1885–1903)
- Sir Reginald Talbot; MP for Stafford (1869–1874)
- Walter Cecil Talbot; MP for County Waterford (1859–1865)
- Thomas Tapling; MP for Harborough (1886–1891)
- Sir Peter Tapsell; MP for Horncastle (1966–1983), East Lindsey (1983–1997) and Louth and Horncastle (1997–2015)
- Mavis Tate; MP for Willesden West (1931–1935) and Frome (1935–1945)
- Sir Charles Taylor; MP for Eastbourne (1935–1974)
- Edwin Taylor; MP for Bolton East (1960–1964)
- Frank Taylor; MP for Manchester Moss Side (1961–1974)
- Hugh Taylor; MP for Tynemouth and North Shields (1852–1854; 1859–1861)
- Ian Taylor; MP for Esher (1987–1997) and Esher and Walton (1997–2010)
- John Taylor; MP for Solihull (1983–2005)
- Robert Taylor; MP for Croydon North West (1970–1981)
- Sir Teddy Taylor; MP for Glasgow Cathcart (1964–1979), Southend East (1980–1997) and Rochford and Southend East (1997–2005)
- Thomas Edward Taylor; MP for County Dublin (1841–1883)
- Sir William Taylor, 1st Baronet; MP for Bradford North (1950–1964)
- Norman Tebbit; MP for Epping (1970–1974) and Chingford (1974–1992)
- William Teeling
- John Meredith Temple
- Sir Owen Temple-Morris; MP for Cardiff East (1931–1942)
- Peter Temple-Morris; MP for Leominster (1974–1997)
- James Emerson Tennent
- Stefan Terlezki
- George Terrell; MP for Chippenham (1910–1922)
- **Margaret Thatcher**; MP for Finchley (1959–1992)
- Bradley Thomas; MP for Bromsgrove (2024–present)
- Derek Thomas; MP for St Ives (2015–2024)
- Henry Thomas; MP for Kinsale (1835–1837; 1838–1841)
- James Thomas, 1st Viscount Cilcennin
- Leslie Thomas; MP for Canterbury (1953–1966)
- Peter Thomas, Baron Thomas of Gwydir
- Sir Frederick Thomson, 1st Baronet
- Ross Thomson; MP for Aberdeen South (2017–2019)
- Roy Thomason
- Donald Thompson
- Sir Kenneth Thompson, 1st Baronet
- Patrick Thompson
- Sir Richard Thompson, 1st Baronet
- Neil Thorne
- Peter Thorneycroft; MP for Stafford (1938–1945) and Monmouth (1945–1966)
- Malcolm Thornton
- Colin Thornton-Kemsley
- Robert Thorp
- John Henry Thorpe
- Maggie Throup; MP for Erewash (2015–2024)
- Peter Thurnham
- Henry Thynne, 7th Viscount Weymouth
- Thomas Thynne, 8th Viscount Weymouth
- Arthur Tiley
- John Tilney
- Nick Timothy; MP for West Suffolk (2024–present)
- Edward Timpson; MP for Crewe and Nantwich (2008–2017) and Eddisbury (2019–2024)
- Alfred Todd; MP for Berwick-upon-Tweed (1929–1935)
- Kelly Tolhurst; MP for Rochester and Strood (2015–2024)
- John Tollemache, 1st Baron Tollemache
- Wilbraham Tollemache, 2nd Baron Tollemache
- "Colonel" George Tomline
- Justin Tomlinson; MP for North Swindon (2010–2024)
- Michael Tomlinson; MP for Mid Dorset and North Poole (2015–2024)
- Charles Tottenham; MP for New Ross (1856–1863)
- Charles George Tottenham; MP for New Ross (1863–1868; 1878–1880)
- George Touche
- Sir Gordon Touche, 1st Baronet
- John Townend; MP for East Yorkshire (1979–1997) and Bridlington (1997–2001)
- Max Townley
- Cyril Townsend
- Craig Tracey; MP for North Warwickshire (2015–2024)
- Richard Tracey
- Anthony Trafford, Baron Trafford
- David Tredinnick; MP for Bosworth (1987–2019)
- Ronald Tree
- Michael Trend; MP for Windsor and Maidenhead (1992–1997) and Windsor (1997–2005)
- Anne-Marie Trevelyan; MP for Berwick-upon-Tweed (2015–2024)
- Horace Trevor-Cox; MP for Stalybridge and Hyde (1937–1945)
- Peter Trew; MP for Dartford (1970–1974)
- David Trippier; MP for Rossendale (1979–1983) and Rossendale and Darwen (1983–1992)
- Laura Trott; MP for Sevenoaks (2019–present)
- Neville Trotter
- **Liz Truss**; MP for South West Norfolk (2010–2024)
- George Tryon, 1st Baron Tryon
- Steve Tuckwell; MP for Uxbridge and South Ruislip (2023–2024)
- Richard Tufnell; MP for Cambridge (1934–1945)
- Christopher Tugendhat, Baron Tugendhat
- Tom Tugendhat; MP for Tonbridge and Malling (2015–2024) and Tonbridge (2024–present)
- Andrew Turner; MP for Isle of Wight (2001–2017)
- Colin William Carstairs Turner
- Edward Turnour, 6th Earl Winterton
- Robin Turton, Baron Tranmire
- Ian Twinn
- Andrew Tyrie; MP for Chichester (1997–2017)

=== U ===
- Paul Uppal; MP for Wolverhampton South West (2010–2015)
- David Urquhart; MP for Stafford (1847–1852)

=== V ===
- Ed Vaizey; MP for Wantage (2005–2019; 2019)
- Charles James Valentine; MP for Cockermouth (1885–1886)
- Crofton Moore Vandeleur; MP for County Clare (1859–1874)
- George Henry Vansittart; MP for Berkshire (1852–1859)
- Sir William van Straubenzee; MP for Wokingham (1959–1987)
- Shailesh Vara; MP for North West Cambridgeshire (2005–2024)
- Sir Gerard Vaughan; MP for Reading (1970–1974), Reading South (1974–1983) and Reading East (1983–1997)
- John Vaughan-Morgan; MP for Reigate (1950–1970)
- Francis Venables-Vernon-Harcourt; MP for Isle of Wight (1852–1857)
- Richard Verney; MP for Rugby (1895–1900)
- Leicester Viney Vernon; MP for Chatham (1853–1857) and Berkshire (1859–1860)
- Douglas Vickers; MP for Sheffield Hallam (1918–1922)
- Dame Joan Vickers; MP for Plymouth Devonport (1955–1974)
- Martin Vickers; MP for Cleethorpes (2010–2024) and Brigg and Immingham (2024–present)
- Matt Vickers; MP for Stockton South (2019–2024) and Stockton West (2024–present)
- Stanley Vickers; MP for Wallingford (1868–1872)
- Sir Peter Viggers; MP for Gosport (1974–2010)
- Edward Villiers, Lord Hyde; MP for Brecon (1869–1870)
- Theresa Villiers; MP for Chipping Barnet (2005–2024)
- Sir Howard Vincent; MP for Sheffield Central (1885–1908)
- Sir Edgar Vincent; MP for Exeter (1899–1906)
- Dennis Vosper; MP for Runcorn (1950–1964)
- Sir Richard Vyvyan, 8th Baronet; MP for Bristol (1834–1837) and Helston (1841–1857)

=== W ===
- David Waddington; MP for Maldon (1847–1852) and Harwich (1852–1856)
- David Waddington; MP for Nelson and Colne (1968–1974), Clitheroe (1979–1983) and Ribble Valley (1983–1990)
- Edward Wakefield; MP for West Derbyshire (1950–1962)
- Sir Wavell Wakefield; MP for Swindon (1935–1945) and St Marylebone (1945–1963)
- Christian Wakeford; MP for Bury South (2019–2022)
- John Wakeham; MP for Maldon (1974–1983) and South Colchester and Maldon (1983–1992)
- William Waldegrave; MP for Bristol West (1979–1997)
- George Walden; MP for Buckingham (1983–1997)
- David Walder; MP for High Peak (1961–1966) and Clitheroe (1970–1978)
- Bill Walker; MP for Perth and East Perthshire (1979–1983) and North Tayside (1983–1997)
- Sir Charles Walker; MP for Broxbourne (2005–2024)
- Peter Walker; MP for Worcester (1961–1992)
- Robin Walker; MP for Worcester (2010–2024)
- William Walker, 1st Baron Wavertree
- Derek Walker-Smith
- Sir Patrick Wall; MP for Haltemprice (1954–1983) and Beverley (1983–1987)
- Ben Wallace; MP for Lancaster and Wyre (2005–2010) and Wyre and Preston North (2010–2024)
- Euan Wallace; MP for Rugby (1922–1923) and Hornsey (1924–1941)
- Gary Waller; MP for Brighouse and Spenborough (1979–1983) and Keighley (1983–1997)
- Jamie Wallis; MP for Bridgend (2019–2024)
- Gerard Wallop, 9th Earl of Portsmouth
- Frederick Walpole; MP for Norfolk North (1868–1876)
- Sir William Walrond, 1st Baronet; MP for Devon East (1880–1885) and Tiverton (1885–1905)
- William Walrond; MP for Tiverton (1906–1915)
- John Edward Walsh; MP for Dublin University (1866–1867)
- Robert Walter; MP for North Dorset (1997–2015)
- Sir Dennis Walters; MP for Kingston upon Hull North West (1918–1945)
- David Warburton; MP for Somerton and Frome (2015–2023)
- Sir Albert Lambert Ward, 1st Baronet; MP for Westbury (1964–1992)
- Christopher Ward; MP for Swindon (1969–1970)
- Dame Irene Ward; MP for Wallsend (1931–1945) and Tynemouth (1950–1974)
- Sir John Ward; MP for Poole (1979–1997)
- Sarah Ward; MP for Cannock (1931–1935)
- William Ward, 3rd Earl of Dudley
- Thomas Waring; MP for North Down (1885–1898)
- John Wardlaw-Milne
- Charles Wardle; MP for Bexhill and Battle (1983–2001)
- William Ward Warner
- Matt Warman; MP for Boston and Skegness (2015–2024)
- Kenneth Warren
- Robert Warren; MP for Dublin University (1867–1868)
- Sir Victor Warrender, 8th Baronet; MP for Grantham (1923–1942)
- Charles Warton
- Nigel Waterson; MP for Eastbourne (1992–2010)
- Dame Angela Watkinson; MP for Upminster (2001–2010) and Hornchurch and Upminster (2010–2017)
- Harold Watkinson, 1st Viscount Watkinson
- Giles Watling; MP for Clacton (2017–2024)
- John Watson
- William Watson, Baron Watson
- William Watson, Baron Thankerton
- James Watts; MP for Manchester Moss Side (1959–1961)
- John Arthur Watts
- Sir Thomas Watts; MP for Manchester Withington (1922–1923; 1924–1929)
- Bernard Weatherill; MP for Croydon North East (1964–1983)
- Mike Weatherley; MP for Hove (2010–2015)
- Suzanne Webb; MP for Stourbridge (2019–2024)
- Harold Webbe
- David Webster; MP for Weston-super-Mare (1958–1969)
- Sir Richard Webster; MP for Launceston (1885) and Isle of Wight (1885–1900)
- Lord Charles Wellesley
- Bowen Wells; MP for Hertford and Stevenage (1979–1983) and Hertford and Stortford (1983–2001)
- Sir John Wells; MP for Maidstone (1959–1987)
- Willard Garfield Weston; MP for Macclesfield (1939–1945)
- James Wharton; MP for Stockton South (2010–2017)
- Helen Whately; MP for Faversham and Mid Kent (2015–present)
- Sir Mervyn Wheatley; MP for East Dorset (1945–1950) and Poole (1950–1951)
- Heather Wheeler; MP for South Derbyshire (2010–2024)
- Sir John Wheeler; MP for Paddington (1979–1983) and Westminster North (1983–1997)
- Sir Granville Wheler, 1st Baronet; MP for Faversham (1910–1928)
- Chris White; MP for Warwick and Leamington (2010–2017)
- Roger White; MP for Gravesend (1970–1974)
- Graeme Alexander Lockhart Whitelaw; MP for North West Lanarkshire (1892–1895)
- William Whitelaw; MP for Perth (1892–1895)
- William Whitelaw; MP for Penrith and The Border (1955–1983)
- George Whiteley; MP for Stockport (1893–1900)
- John Whiteley; MP for Buckingham (1937–1943)
- James Whiteside; MP for Enniskillen (1851–1859) and Dublin University (1859–1866)
- John Whitfield; MP for Dewsbury (1983–1987)
- Sir Ray Whitney; MP for Wycombe (1978–2001)
- Craig Whittaker; MP for Calder Valley (2010–2024)
- John Whittingdale; MP for South Colchester and Maldon (1992–1997), Maldon and East Chelmsford (1997–2010) and Maldon (2010–present)
- Jardine Whyte; MP for North East Derbyshire (1931–1935)
- Keith Wickenden; MP for Dorking (1979–1983)
- Edward Wickham; MP for Taunton (1935–1945)
- William Wickham; MP for Petersfield (1892–1897)
- Ann Widdecombe; MP for Maidstone (1987–1997) and Maidstone and The Weald (1997–2010)
- Bill Wiggin; MP for Leominster (2001–2010) and North Herefordshire (2010–2024)
- Sir Jerry Wiggin; MP for Weston-super-Mare (1969–1997)
- Loftus Wigram; MP for Cambridge University (1850–1859)
- James Wild; MP for North West Norfolk (2019–present)
- John Wilkinson; MP for Bradford West (1970–1974) and Ruislip-Northwood (1979–2005)
- David Willetts; MP for Havant (1992–2015)
- Francis Willey, 2nd Baron Barnby
- Craig Williams; MP for Cardiff North (2015–2017) and Montgomeryshire (2019–2024)
- Delwyn Williams
- Donald Williams; MP for Dudley (1968–1970)
- Herbert Williams
- Paul Williams
- Sir Robert Williams, 1st Baronet; MP for West Dorset (1895–1922)
- Sir Gavin Williamson; MP for South Staffordshire (2010–2024) and Stone, Great Wyrley and Penkridge (2024–present)
- Charles Williams-Wynn; MP for Montgomeryshire (1834–1850)
- Charles Williams-Wynn; MP for Montgomeryshire (1862–1880)
- Herbert Watkin Williams-Wynn; MP for Montgomeryshire (1850–1862)
- Henry Willink; MP for Croydon North (1940–1948)
- Gilbert Wills, 1st Baron Dulverton
- Gerald Wills
- Wilfrid Wills; MP for Batley and Morley (1931–1935)
- David Wilshire; MP for Spelthorne (1987–2010)
- Geoffrey Wilson
- Henry Hughes Wilson
- Rob Wilson; MP for Reading East (2005–2017)
- Sir Samuel Wilson; MP for Portsmouth (1886–1892)
- William Wilson; MP for County Donegal (1876–1879)
- Lewis Winby; MP for Harborough (1924–1929)
- Ivor Windsor-Clive, 2nd Earl of Plymouth
- Rowland Winn; MP for North Lincolnshire (1868–1885)
- Rowland Winn; MP for Pontefract (1885–1893)
- Ann Winterton; MP for Congleton (1983–2010)
- Sir Nicholas Winterton; MP for Macclesfield (1971–2010)
- Roy Wise
- Edmond Wodehouse
- Gustav Wilhelm Wolff
- Mark Wolfson
- Sarah Wollaston; MP for Totnes (2010–2019)
- Patrick Wolrige-Gordon
- Walter Womersley
- Charles Wood, 2nd Earl of Halifax
- Edmund Wood; MP for Stalybridge and Hyde (1924–1929)
- Edward Wood, Lord Irwin; MP for Ripon (1910–1925)
- Sir John Wood, 1st Baronet
- Kingsley Wood
- Mike Wood; MP for Dudley South (2015–2024) and Kingswinford and South Staffordshire (2024–present)
- Richard Wood, Baron Holderness
- Thomas Wood; MP for Middlesex (1837–1847)
- Timothy Wood; MP for Stevenage (1983–1997)
- Mike Woodcock; MP for Ellesmere Port and Neston (1983–1992)
- Montague Woodhouse, 5th Baron Terrington
- Mark Woodnutt
- Shaun Woodward; MP for Witney (1997–1999)
- John Woollam
- Sir Marcus Worsley, 5th Baronet; MP for Keighley (1959–1964) and Chelsea (1966–1974)
- Henry de Worms, 1st Baron Pirbright
- Laming Worthington-Evans
- Sir Herbert Wragg; MP for Belper (1923–1929; 1931–1945)
- William Wragg; MP for Hazel Grove (2015–2024)
- Beatrice Wright; MP for Bodmin (1941–1945)
- Esmond Wright
- Henry FitzHerbert Wright
- Sir Jeremy Wright; MP for Rugby and Kenilworth (2005–2010) and Kenilworth and Southam (2010–present)
- Wallace Duffield Wright
- Harry Wrightson; MP for Leyton West (1918–1919)
- George Wyndham
- Sir Henry Wyndham; MP for Cockermouth (1852–1857) and West Cumberland (1857–1860)
- Henry Wyndham; MP for West Sussex (1854–1869)
- Edwin Wyndham-Quin, 3rd Viscount Adare; MP for Glamorganshire (1837–1851)
- William Robert Maurice Wynne; MP for Merioneth (1865–1868)
- William Watkin Edward Wynne; MP for Merioneth (1859–1865)
- Marmaduke D'Arcy Wyvill; MP for Otley (1895–1900)

=== Y ===
- Sir John Yarde-Buller, 3rd Baronet; MP for South Devon (1835–1858)
- Sir Charles Yate, 1st Baronet; MP for Melton (1910–1924)
- William Yates; MP for The Wrekin (1955–1966)
- James Yeaman; MP for Dundee (1879–1880)
- Tim Yeo; MP for South Suffolk (1983–2015)
- Robert Yerburgh; MP for City of Chester (1886–1906; 1910–1916)
- John Yorke; MP for Tewkesbury (1864–1968; 1885–1886) and East Gloucestershire (1872–1885)
- Charles Young; MP for Christchurch (1885–1892)
- Sir George Young, 6th Baronet; MP for Acton (1974–1983), Ealing Acton (1983–1997) and North West Hampshire (1997–2015)
- Hilton Young; MP for Norwich (1926–1929) and Sevenoaks (1929–1935)
- Jacob Young; MP for Redcar (2019–2024)
- Sir John Young, 2nd Baronet; MP for County Cavan (1834–1843; 1853–1855)
- Oliver Young; MP for Wokingham (1898–1901)
- George Younger, 1st Baronet; MP for Ayr Burghs (1906–1922)
- George Younger, 4th Baronet; MP for Ayr (1964–1992)

=== Z ===
- Nadhim Zahawi; MP for Stratford-on-Avon (2010–2024)

== See also ==
- History of the Conservative Party
