= John Henderson (West Aberdeenshire MP) =

John Henderson

John McDonald Henderson FCA (1846 – 20 November 1922) was a Scottish chartered accountant, barrister and Liberal Member of Parliament.

== Education and family ==
Henderson was a native of the city of Aberdeen. He was educated at Robert Gordon's College and at Marischal College, both in Aberdeen. In 1872, he married Kate Mary, the daughter of Thomas Francis Robins. They had one son and a daughter.

== Career ==
Henderson qualified as a chartered accountant. He was a Fellow of the Institute of Chartered Accountants in England and Wales. He appeared in court often, regularly being appointed a trustee for bankrupt companies, which perhaps encouraged him to go in for the law as well. He was called to the Bar by Gray's Inn in 1897. He also had business interests, being a director of Thomas Bolton and Son Ltd, brass and copper manufacturers, the Lancashire United Tramways Company and other firms.

== Politics ==
=== Liberal Imperialist ===
Henderson was a member of the Imperial Liberal Council. The Liberal Imperialists were a centrist faction within the Liberal Party in the late Victorian and Edwardian period, favouring a more positive attitude towards the development of the British Empire and Imperialism and opposing the party's commitment to Irish Home Rule. In domestic affairs, they advocated the concept of 'national efficiency', a policy never definitively set out, but the implication in the speeches of its leading lights was that the Liberal Party in government should take action to improve the social conditions, education and welfare of the population and reform aspects of the administration of government to maintain British economic, industrial and military competitiveness.

=== Member of Parliament ===
In 1905, the sitting MP for Aberdeenshire West, Dr Robert Farquharson, decided to stand down at the next election, and Henderson was selected in his place. At the 1906 general election, Henderson duly held the seat by 5,949 votes to the 2,791 polled by his Unionist opponent, R McNeill, a majority of 3,158. He voted in favour of the 1908 Women's Enfranchisement Bill. Henderson held his seat against a new Tory opponent in January 1910, defeating Mr G Smith by 5,901 votes to 3,194, a majority of 2,707. Henderson's majority again decreased at the December 1910 general election. Again facing Smith for the Unionists, Henderson won by 5,415 votes to 3,232, a reduced majority of 2,183 but still comfortably ahead.

=== Irish Home Rule controversy ===
During the December 1910 general election, Henderson was unwittingly caught up in a row over Irish Home Rule. He received a letter from Lord Aberdeen who was at the time Lord-Lieutenant of Ireland. Lord Aberdeen wrote to Henderson saying he felt fears about the consequences of Home Rule were baseless, especially apprehensions concerning religious intolerance and that Henderson could quote this opinion during the election.

While The Times newspaper reported that Lord Aberdeen was not taken very seriously in Ireland, his remarks nevertheless gave offence to Unionists there, as the Lord-Lieutenant was supposed to stay above party politics. The question of his alleged interference in politics then became the issue. False rumours were that Aberdeen was about to resign. The controversy later rumbled into 1911, with the matter being taken up by the Parliamentary Committee of Privileges.

Lord Aberdeen tried to smooth the waters by explaining that he had written to Henderson in his capacity as Lord-Lieutenant of Aberdeenshire, but that backfired. In a fuller explanation later, he had to clarify that in sending his letters to Henderson he had never meant to use the authority of the Lord-Lieutenancy of Aberdeenshire to influence voters in the general election. Sensing that times were moving on, the Committee of Privileges concluded that Lord Aberdeen had not committed any breach of privilege of the House of Commons.

=== 1918–1919 ===
Although he was by now over 70 years old, Henderson apparently had no wish to leave Parliament. His West Aberdeenshire constituency was being abolished by boundary changes for the 1918 general election. However, Henderson sought and won the Liberal nomination for the new seat of Central Aberdeenshire. He fought the election against Alexander Theodore Gordon, who stood as a Coalition Conservative, a supporter of the Coalition government of David Lloyd George who presumably received the Coalition coupon. Henderson lost by 638 votes, polling 5,908 votes to Gordon's 6,546. Even the defeat was not sufficient to force Henderson into retirement, however. Early in 1919, Gordon died, causing a by-election in Aberdeenshire Central. It was agreed that Henderson should be the candidate and stand as a full blooded Asquithian Liberal. That posed a difficulty for Lloyd George, who, despite his Liberalism, was being required to endorse another Conservative candidate against a Liberal who had represented the party in Parliament for 16 years. As a result, there was some speculation that Henderson would be asked to stand for the Coalition, which Henderson and his local Liberal Association were willing to accept this. Henderson exchanged letters with Freddie Guest, the Coalition Liberal Chief Whip, coming to an agreement to give overall support to the government, but the Aberdeenshire Tories would not adopt Henderson as the Coalition candidate and chose their own man, L F W Davidson.

In the end, Henderson decided not to contest the by-election and stood down in favour of his Liberal colleague Murdoch McKenzie Wood, who won the by-election with a majority of 186 votes, in a three-cornered contest with the Unionists and Labour.

== Appointments ==
In 1911, Henderson was appointed as a Justice of the Peace for the County of Suffolk, where he had a home in Felixstowe. He was also JP for the County of Surrey, where he had another home.

== Death ==
Henderson died from pneumonia in Aberdeen at 76. He was buried at Putney Vale Cemetery in Surrey, near his London home in Wimbledon.

Parliament of the United Kingdom
Preceded by Robert Farquharson	Member of Parliament for West Aberdeenshire; 1906 – 1918	Constituency abolished
