= St Talorgan Parish Church =

Ruined church in Fordyce, Aberdeenshire

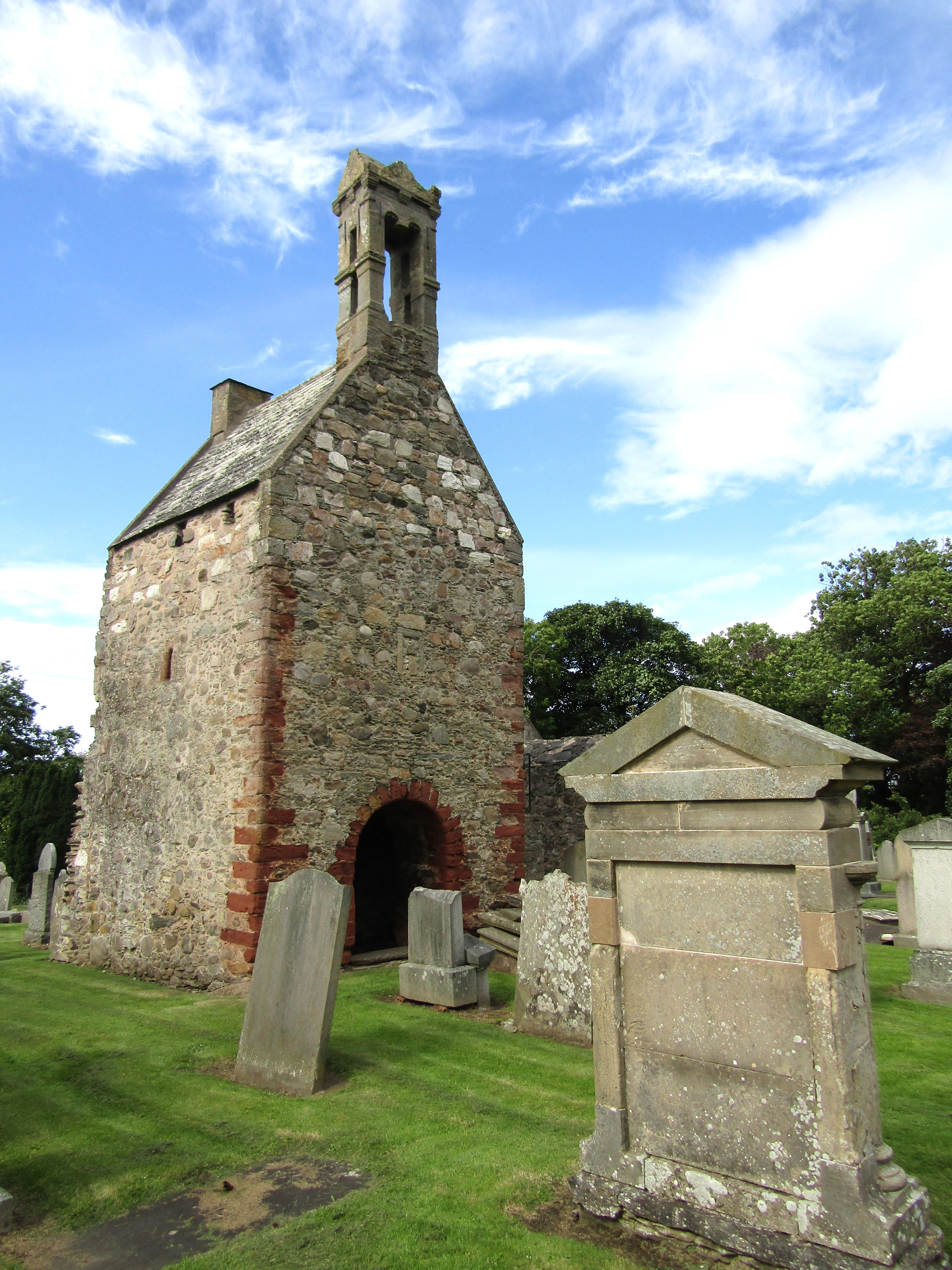
- The church and burial ground, 2024
- St Talorgan Parish Church
- 57.662335°N 2.7462784°W
- Location: Fordyce, Aberdeenshire
- Country: Scotland

Scheduled monument
- Official name: Fordyce, old church and burial ground
- Type: Ecclesiastical: burial ground, cemetery, graveyard; church
- Designated: 28 August 1959
- Reference no.: SM352

St Talorgan Parish Church is a ruined church in Fordyce, Aberdeenshire, Scotland. The church was established in the 13th century and dedicated to St Talorgan, also known as St Talarican. In 1351, it was made a common church of the Cathedral Chapter of Aberdeen. Today, only the chancel and western tower remain. The surviving structure includes 16th century burial enclosures and a bellcote built in 1661. In 1804 the church was abandoned and dismantled when a new church, Fordyce Parish Church, was built in the village. The church and walled burial ground is now a scheduled monument; it was formerly Category A listed.

== Description ==
St Talorgan Parish Church is a ruined medieval church in Fordyce, Aberdeenshire, Scotland, of which only the chancel and western tower—added after the Reformation, still survive. The church was constructed with rubble and polished ashlar dressings. The medieval chancel is divided into two burial enclosures and contains canopied tombs with the recumbent effigy of the Ogilvies of Findlater. The Latin inscription on the tomb translates as: "Here rest two honourable men, James Ogilvy of Deskford, and James Ogilvy, his son and heir presumptive. The former died 13 February 1509 and the latter 1 February 1505. Pray for their souls."

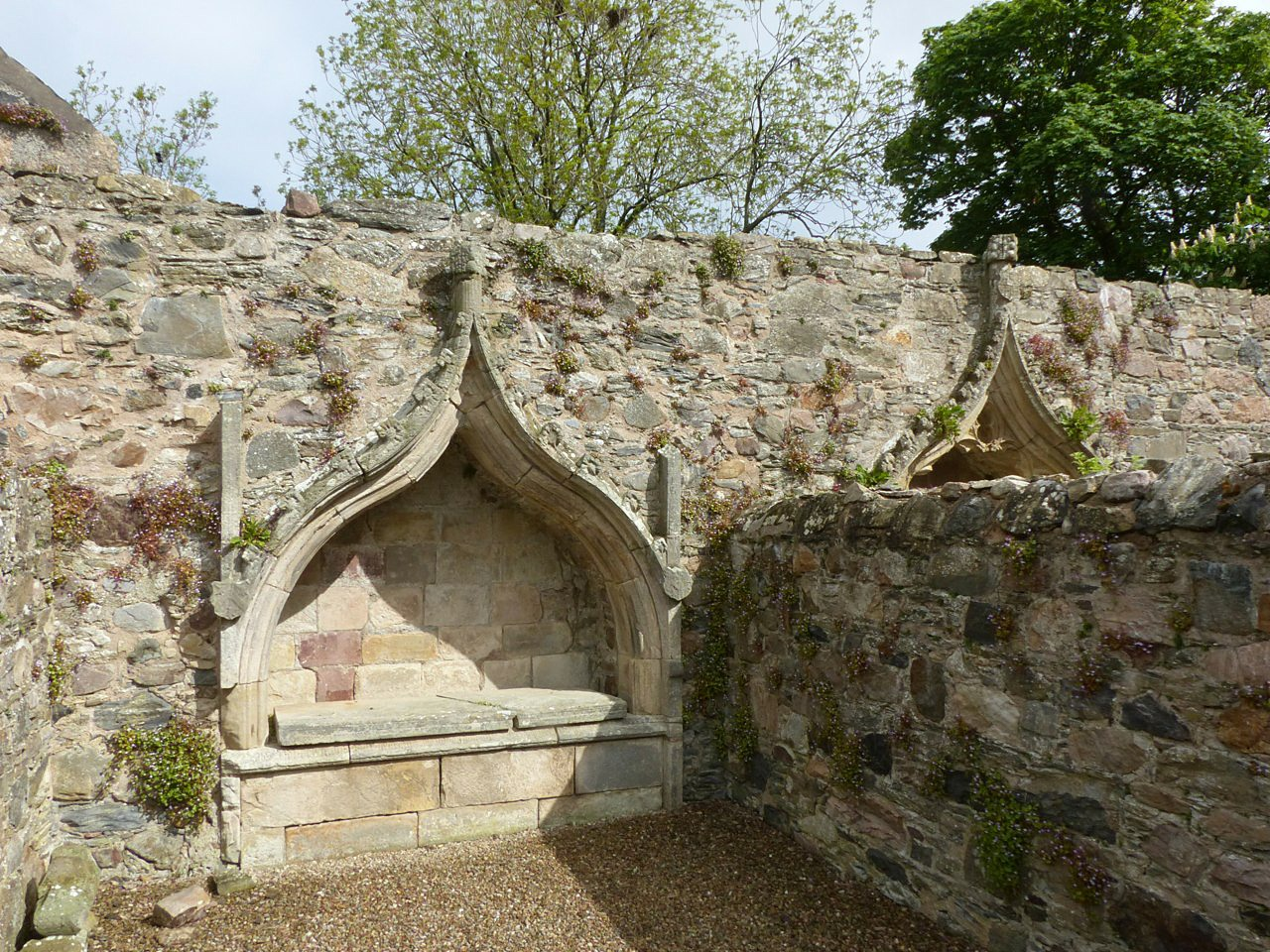
Divided chancel and tomb

The first floor entrance is accessed by stairs on the exterior. The southwest two-storey and loft tower was constructed with mixed random rubble and red sandstone quoins. The tower was elevated to raise the height of an earlier entrance porch. The upper floor has been used as both a prison and session house. The bellcote is dated 1661. The burial ground is surrounded by rubble-stone walls topped with coping stones. The entrance features square gateposts with flat caps and cast-iron carriage gates.

== History ==
A church has existed on the site since the 13th century. The current building was dedicated to St Talorgan, (variously spelled as St Talarican or St Tarquin), a Pictish saint who later became Bishop of Sodor and Man around 720 AD. The first written record of the church dates to 1272, when King Alexander III of Scotland appointed Andrew de Garentuly as minister. In 1351, it was made a common church of the Cathedral Chapter of Aberdeen. In 1516, a chapel dedicated to the Blessed Virgin was donated by Thomas Menzies of Fordyce Castle and built on the south side of the nave. Today, the roofless chapel is known as St Mary's Aisle.

The chancel was remade into a burial asile for the Ogilve family after the Reformation. In 1661 the bell tower was built above the earlier entrance porch. In 1679, the Abercromby family donated the Abercrombie of Glassaugh aisle, a detached burial aisle with a small bellcote. To accommodate more parishioners, a loft was added to the nave in 1766. The church was considered too small for the village by the end of the 18th century. After a new church, Fordyce Parish Church, was built in 1804, St Talorgan's was abandoned and mostly torn down. The church and walled burial ground is now a scheduled monument, having formerly been Category A listed,
