= Battle of Balaclava order of battle =

This is the complete order of battle of opposing forces at the Battle of Balaclava.

== Allied Army ==
The Allied Army consisted of British and French troops as well as Turkish formations under British command.

=== British Army ===
- Headquarters - General Lord Raglan
  - Lieutenant-General on staff - Lieutenant-General Sir John Burgoyne
  - Quartermaster-General - Brigadier-General Richard Airey
  - Adjutant-General - Brigadier-General James Bucknall Bucknall Estcourt
  - Commander, Royal Artillery - Brigadier-General Thomas Fox-Strangways
  - Commander, Royal Engineers - Captain John William Gordon
- Cavalry Division - under Lieutenant-General George Bingham, 3rd Earl of Lucan with a total force of 1,500 sabres and 6 field guns.
  - Heavy Cavalry Brigade - Brigadier-General James Scarlett
    - 4th Dragoon Guards - Lieutenant-Colonel Edward Hodge
    - 5th Dragoon Guards - Captain Adolphus Burton
    - 1st Dragoons - Lieutenant-Colonel John Yorke
    - 2nd Dragoons - Lieutenant-Colonel Henry Griffith
    - 6th Dragoons - Lieutenant-Colonel Henry White
  - Light Cavalry Brigade - Major-General James Brudenell, 7th Earl of Cardigan
    - 4th Light Dragoons - Brevet Colonel Lord George Paget
    - 8th Hussars - Lieutenant-Colonel Frederick Shewell
    - 11th Hussars - Lieutenant-Colonel John Douglas
    - 13th Light Dragoons - Captain John Oldham
    - 17th Lancers - Captain William Morris
  - Royal Horse Artillery
    - I Troop - Captain George Maude

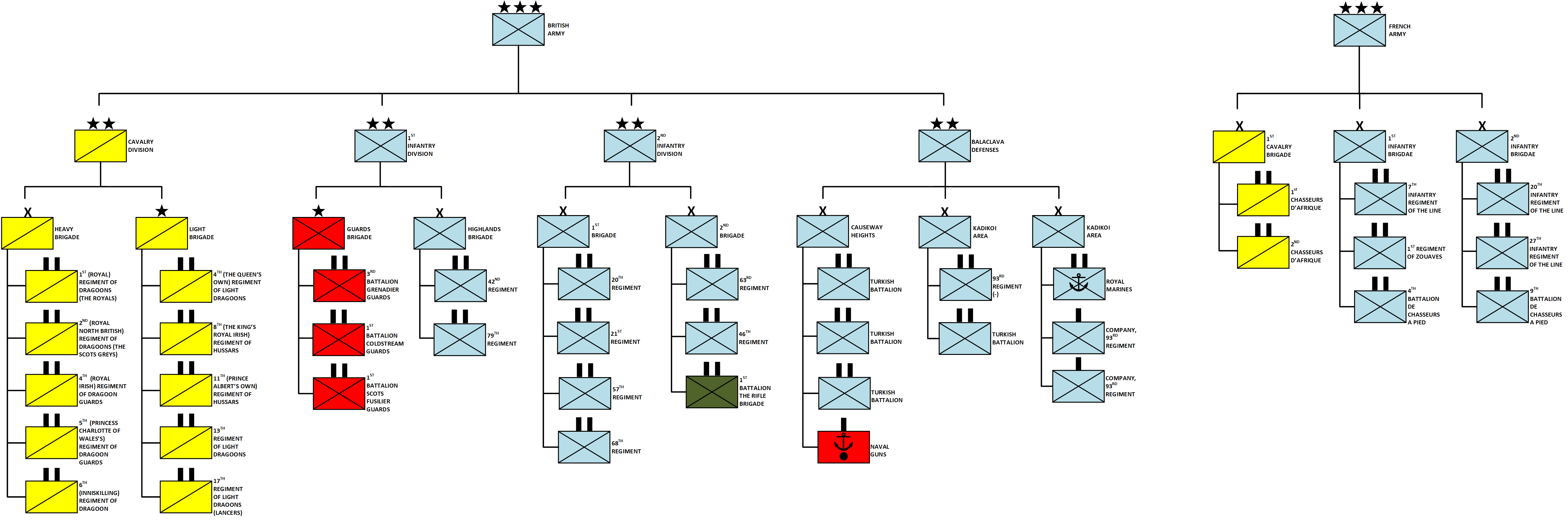
Organization the Allies for the Balaclava campaign

- 1st Division - Lieutenant-General Prince George, Duke of Cambridge with 4,000 men.
  - 1st Guards Brigade - Major-General Henry Bentinck
    - 3rd Battalion Grenadier Guards - Brevet Colonel Edward Birch Reynardson
    - 1st Battalion Coldstream Guards - Brevet Colonel George Upton
    - 1st Battalion Scots Fusiliers Guards - Brevet Colonel Edward Forestier-Walker
  - 2nd Highland Brigade - Brevet Colonel Duncan Cameron
    - 42nd Highlanders - Brevet Lieutenant-Colonel Thomas Tulloch
    - 79th Highlanders - Lieutenant-Colonel John Douglas
  - Royal Artillery - Lieutenant-Colonel Richard Dacres
    - A Field Battery (2nd Company, 8th Battalion) - Captain David Paynter
    - H Field Battery (5th Company, 11th Battalion) - Captain Edward Wodehouse
- 4th Division - Lieutenant-General Sir George Cathcart with 5,000 men.
  - 1st Brigade - Brigadier-General Thomas Goldie
    - 20th Foot - Brevet Colonel Frederick Horn
    - 21st Foot - Lieutenant-Colonel Frederick Ainslie
    - 57th Foot - Brevet Lieutenant-Colonel Thomas Powell
  - 2nd Brigade - Brigadier-General Arthur Torrens
    - 2 companies, 46th Foot - Captain William Hardy
    - 63rd Foot - Lieutenant-Colonel Exham Swyny
    - 68th Foot - Lieutenant-Colonel Henry Smyth
    - 1st Battalion The Rifle Brigade - Brevet Lieutenant-Colonel Alfred Horsford
  - Royal Artillery - Lieutenant-Colonel David Wood
    - P Field Battery (4th Company, 12th Battalion) - Brevet Major Samuel Townsend
- Balaclava defences - Major-General Sir Colin Campbell with 4,000 men and 35 naval and field guns.
  - 93rd Highlanders - Lieutenant-Colonel William Ainslie
  - Battalion of Detachments - Brevet Lieutenant-Colonel Burton Daveney
  - Royal Marine Brigade - Acting Colonel Thomas Hurdle
    - 1st Composite Battalion, Royal Marines - Captain William Hopkins
    - 2nd Composite Battalion, Royal Marines - Captain Richard Meheux
  - Artillery
    - 5 batteries, Royal Marine Artillery - Captain George Alexander
    - W Field Battery (1st Company, 11th Battalion) - Captain George Barker
  - Attached Turkish Army forces - Lewa Rustem Pasha
    - 8 infantry battalions and artillery

=== French Army ===
Commanded by General François Certain Canrobert.

- 1re Brigade de Cavalerie - General d'Allonville with 1,500 sabres.
  - 1er régiment de chasseurs d'Afrique
  - 4e régiment de chasseurs d'Afrique
- Corps d'Observation - General Pierre Bosquet
  - 1re Brigade d'Infanterie - General Charles-Marie-Esprit Espinasse
    - 7e régiment d'infanterie de ligne
    - 1er régiment de zouaves
    - 4e bataillon de chasseurs à pied
  - 2e Brigade d'Infanterie - General Joseph Vinoy with 4,000 men.
    - 20e régiment d'infanterie de ligne
    - 27e régiment d'infanterie de ligne
    - 9e bataillon de chasseurs à pied

== Russian Army ==
Commanded by Prince Aleksandr Sergeyevich Menshikov with a total of 25,000 men and 78 guns.

- Cavalry - Lt. Gen. I.I. Ryzhov with 3,000 sabres and 16 guns.
  - Kiev Regiment
  - Ingermanland Regiment
  - (No.)1 Ural Cossacks
- North Column - Col. A.P. Skiuderi with 4,000 men and 12 guns.
  - Odessa Regiment
  - (No.)53 Don Cossacks
  - (No.)4 Rifle Battalion (1 company)
- Left Center Column - Maj. Gen. K.R. Semiakin with 5,000 men and 10 guns.
  - Azov Regiment
  - Dnieper Regiment
  - (No.)4 Rifle Battalion (1 company)
- Right Center Column - Maj. Gen. F.G. Levutski with 3,000 men and 8 guns.
  - Ukraine Regiment
- South Column - Maj. Gen. S.I. Gribbe with 3,000 men and 10 guns
  - Dnieper Regiment
  - Composite Uhlan Regiment
  - Ingermanland Regiment
  - (No.)60 Don Cossacks
- Forward Reserves - Maj. Gen. O.P. Zhaboritski with 5,000 men and 10 guns.
  - Vladimir Regiment
  - Susdal Regiment
  - (No.)6 Rifle Battalion
  - Ingermanland Regiment (two squadrons)
  - (No.)60 Don Cossacks (two sotnias)
- Reserves - total of 2,000 men and 12 guns.
  - Ukraine Regiment (1 squadron)
  - (No.)4 Rifle Battalion (1 company)
  - Composite Uhlan Regiment
