= Harry Griffiths =

Harry Griffiths may refer to:

- Harry Griffiths (footballer, born 1912) (1912–1981), English football and baseball player
- Harry Griffiths (footballer, born 1931) (1931–1978), Welsh footballer and manager
- Harry Griffiths (footballer, born 1886) (1886–1933), English footballer
- Harry Griffiths (footballer, born 1875) (1875–1950), English footballer
- Harry Griffiths (politician) (1866–1935), Australian politician
- Harry Griffiths (missionary), Methodist missionary in Australia

== See also ==
- Harry Griffith (disambiguation)
- Henry Griffiths (disambiguation)
