= Fordyce Academy =

Location
- Fordyce, Banffshire; Scotland; 57°39′43″N 2°44′47″W

Information
- Type: Private grammar school, later maintained grammar school
- Motto: Praesis ut Prosis
- Religious affiliation: Church of Scotland
- Established: 1592 / 1790
- Founder: Sir Thomas Menzies; George Smith, of Bombay
- Closed: 1964
- Gender: Boys, then from early 20th century co-educational
- Enrolment: Between 20 and 100 pupils (at different times)
- Former pupils: People educated at Fordyce Academy
- Affiliations: King's College, Aberdeen

Fordyce Academy, known until the mid-19th century as Fordyce School, and also sometimes called Smith's Academy, was a famous grammar school in the village of Fordyce, Banffshire, Scotland, founded about 1592, refounded in 1790, and closed in 1964. By the early 20th century the school was so highly regarded in Scotland that it was known as "the Eton of the North".

== History ==
A school was founded about 1592 by Sir Thomas Menzies, laird of Durn, and the builder of Fordyce Castle, as a school for boys to prepare them for a life of learning, including possible entry to the University of Aberdeen. The site of the first schoolhouse in the village is unknown, but it was probably near the kirk, where Menzies provided for the boys to have seats in the Durn Aisle. He endowed his new school with an income to be paid to the schoolmaster from the lands of Little Goveny, a mill, and the mill lands of Baldavie and Petchaidlie.

Menzies's foundation gained further endowments in the late 17th century. Walter Ogilvie of Reidhythe gave money to George Brown, the schoolmaster, to build a new schoolhouse, and in 1678 in his will Ogilvie gave the lands of Reidhyth, Meikle, and Little Bogton to create scholarships at the school and at King's College, Aberdeen. These became known as the Ogilvie or Reidhythe Bursaries.

Between 1716 and 1789, this school occupied Glassaugh's House, a wing of Fordyce Castle.

In 1790, George Smith, a native of the village and son of a blacksmith who had become a merchant of Bombay, died leaving in his will an endowment to establish a school in Fordyce for the support and education of poor boys whose name was Smith, to be overseen by the burgh magistrates of Banff, directing that the schoolmaster should be able to teach English and the main commercial languages of the time, which were French and Dutch. He allowed £25 a year for each such boy, the number to be determined by the income from the endowment. Smith's will also provided for the descendants of his sisters to have the same rights as boys of the name of Smith. This school was begun in a former public hall next to the kirk. A new schoolhouse was built about 1846, now a private residence called Fordyce Academy House. The two schools merged, and further new school buildings were built in 1882 and 1924, the latter called the New Academy. This now houses the village's primary school.

At the beginning of the 19th century, John Forbes (1787–1861) and James Clark (1788–1870), who both later became notable physicians, were at the Fordyce School together and walked there every day from the Findlater estate near Kilnhillock. The school's curriculum was then focussed on Greek and Latin, Modern Languages, and mathematics.

By the middle of the 19th century, the school had changed its name from Fordyce School to Fordyce Academy. The Commissioners reported in 1868 that "Fordyce Academy is partly an endowed school, and partly a private boarding-school." They had visited Fordyce and found there was a good house for the schoolmaster and a good school building with one classroom, with a capacity of forty boys. The Trustees were then holding investments valued at £10,297, producing an income of £308 a year. Out of that, £40 a year was paid to the schoolmaster, who also had the use of his house, and £25 to the minister of the Fordyce kirk, while £225 a year paid for the education of nine boys, who lived with the schoolmaster, Mr Largue. He was also allowed to take other boys into the school as private boarders, and at that time had about sixteen, and there were also a few day boys, making a total of thirty boys in the school.

In 1902, a report by HM Inspector of Schools said of Fordyce Academy that it was "now well established as the most important feeder of the University outside of the City of Aberdeen".

In 1936, The History of Fordyce Academy by Douglas Gordon McLean was published, and the Aberdeen University Review commented that

Aberdeen University welcomes this work, because Fordyce Academy has sent to it a continuous succession of distinguished students who have enhanced the fame of the University in all parts of the world; while not a few of them — Dr. Alexander Geddes, Dr. William Grant, and Dr. George Smith, for example — have done much in its service : moreover, because of the "saving" of Fordyce Academy, Aberdeen University has certain of its Endowments and its Seafield Gold Medals.

The school was more closely integrated into the publicly funded sector in the 1940s, and in 1964 its secondary department was closed, as part of a rationalization of the secondary schools of the area. By then, it had become co-educational, and in 1964 there were 44 boys and girls in the senior school. Most of them, and some of the teaching staff, transferred to the Banff Academy, while the junior department became the village primary school.

== Links with Sweden ==
A number of Swedish descendants of George Smith's sister Jean (1734—1821) took advantage of their right to be educated at the school under the terms of the "Smith Bounty". Smith had granted preference to his sisters' descendants for four generations, and the last of these was George Hjort, born in 1865, a great-great-grandson of Jean Smith, who was a free boarder at the school in the 1870s and was still alive, living in Stockholm, in 1958.

== Notable former pupils ==
- William Robertson (1740–1803), antiquary
- Sir John Forbes (1787–1861), physician-in–ordinary to Queen Victoria
- Sir James Clark, 1st Baronet (1788–1870), also physician-in–ordinary to Queen Victoria
- William Forsyth (1818–1879), poet and journalist
- Thomas Blake Glover (1838–1911), merchant in Japan
- Robert Smith (1848–1914), Scotland international footballer
- James Smith (1844–1876), also a Scotland international footballer
- John Garland (1862–1921), Scottish-born Australian politician
- William Grant (1863–1946), lexicographer, editor of the Scottish National Dictionary
- William Dawson Henderson (1876–1955), zoologist
- Nellie Badenoch, first woman to graduate with First Class Honours from the University of Aberdeen
- Alexander Bremner, physician to the Sultan of Johore
- Sir Murdoch McKenzie Wood (1881–1949), barrister and Liberal member of parliament
- William Grant Craib (1882–1933), botanist
- Alexander Geddes (1885–1970), physicist and meteorologist
- Allan Stewart Fortune (1895–1975), Chief Inspector of Agriculture for Scotland
- Willie Wiseman (1896–1979), Scotland footballer
- Sir Hamish Duncan MacLaren (1898–1990), Director of Electrical Engineering, Admiralty, and President of the Institution of Electrical Engineers
- John Alexander Matheson (1901–1950), Roman Catholic Bishop of Aberdeen
- Francis Walsh (1901–1974), another Roman Catholic Bishop of Aberdeen
- George Archibald Grant Mitchell (1906–1993), professor of anatomy, Manchester University, and Pro-Vice-Chancellor
- William Duff McHardy (1911–2000), Regius Professor of Hebrew in the University of Oxford
- William J. Donald (born 1931), Principal of Thurso College

== Masters and Rectors of the school ==
- Alexander Gray AM (1756—1820), Master
- Rev. James Largue MA, Rector 1845—1882
- Alexander Emslie MA (1875—1947), Rector 1907
- George James Milne MA, Rector 1924—1927
- Alexander S. McHardy MA, Rector 1931
- Andrew W. Thomson, Rector, 1940, 1944
