= 1876 West Aberdeenshire by-election =

UK parliamentary by-election

The 1876 West Aberdeenshire by-election was fought on 10 May 1876. The by-election was fought due to the resignation of the incumbent Liberal MP, William McCombie. It was won by the Liberal candidate Lord Douglas Gordon.

1876 West Aberdeenshire by-election
Party	Candidate	Votes	%	±%
Liberal	Douglas Gordon	2,343	74.2	−13.8
Conservative	Col. Thomas Innes of Learney	813	25.8	+13.8
Majority		1,530	48.4	−27.5
Turnout		3,156	80.9	+11.9
Registered electors		3,899		
Liberal hold		Swing	-13.8	
