= List of listed buildings in Fordyce, Aberdeenshire =

This is a list of listed buildings in the parish of Fordyce in Aberdeenshire, Scotland.

== List ==
Name	Location	Date Listed	Grid Ref. (Note: Sometimes known as OSGB36, the grid reference (where provided) is based on the British national grid reference system used by the Ordnance Survey. • "Guide to National Grid". Ordnance Survey. • "Get-a-map". Ordnance Survey.)	Geo-coordinates	Notes	LB Number (Note: Historic Environment Scotland assign a unique alphanumeric identifier to each designated site in Scotland, for listed buildings this always begins with "LB", for example "LB12345".)	Image
Durn Bridge Over The Burn Of Durn				57°40′26″N 2°41′26″W	Category B	10589	Upload Photo
Fordyce Village, Castle Lane, Cottages At West Side Of Lane				57°39′42″N 2°44′46″W	Category B	10596	Upload Photo
Fordyce Village, 34, 35 Church Street				57°39′42″N 2°44′49″W	Category B	10600	Upload Photo
Fordyce Village, School Road, Easter Villa (Former Free Church Manse)				57°39′41″N 2°44′42″W	Category B	10618	Upload Photo
Fordyce Village, St Tarquins Place, Old Schoolhouse				57°39′39″N 2°44′50″W	Category B	10620	Upload Photo
Fordyce Village, Fordyce House (Former Church Of Scotland Manse) Steading, And Garden Walls				57°39′46″N 2°44′46″W	Category B	10625	Upload Photo
14 Sandend				57°41′10″N 2°44′54″W	Category C(S)	10631	Upload Photo
Fordyce Village, Church Street, Hawthorn Cottage (Hawthorn Restaurant) And Enclosing Walls				57°39′39″N 2°44′52″W	Category C(S)	10635	Upload Photo
Fordyce Village, 2 Church Street				57°39′42″N 2°44′48″W	Category C(S)	10641	Upload Photo
Fordyce Village, Church Street, Culfoich				57°39′42″N 2°44′46″W	Category B	10643	Upload Photo
10 Sandend				57°41′11″N 2°44′54″W	Category B	10667	Upload Photo
34 Sandend And Fishing Store				57°41′08″N 2°44′53″W	Category C(S)	10672	Upload Photo
36 Sandend				57°41′08″N 2°44′52″W	Category B	10674	Upload Photo
39 Sandend, The Muckle Hoose				57°41′09″N 2°44′50″W	Category B	10677	Upload Photo
45 Sandend				57°41′08″N 2°44′52″W	Category C(S)	10682	Upload Photo
54 Sandend				57°41′06″N 2°44′53″W	Category C(S)	10688	Upload Photo
Fordyce Village, 1, 2, 3, 4, St Tarquins Place				57°39′36″N 2°44′44″W	Category B	10693	Upload Photo
Glassaugh Windmill				57°40′45″N 2°44′21″W	Category A	6761	Upload Photo
1C And 1D Sandend With Fish Smoking Kiln Abutting No 1C				57°41′13″N 2°44′54″W	Category B	6765	Upload Photo
14 And A Half Sandend				57°41′10″N 2°44′54″W	Category C(S)	6768	Upload Photo
Birkenbog House, Rear Walled Garden And Flanking Range				57°40′25″N 2°46′43″W	Category A	10586	Upload Photo
Cowhythe Farmhouse				57°40′38″N 2°39′46″W	Category C(S)	10588	Upload Photo
Fordyce Village, 6 East Church Street				57°39′43″N 2°44′44″W	Category C(S)	10614	Upload Photo
Durn House Stables				57°40′27″N 2°41′30″W	Category B	10621	Upload Photo
Fordyce Village, Church Street, North View				57°39′41″N 2°44′49″W	Category C(S)	10640	Upload Photo
42 Sandend				57°41′08″N 2°44′51″W	Category C(S)	10680	Upload Photo
Fordyce Village, Church Street, Fairholm				57°39′42″N 2°44′50″W	Category B	6760	Upload Photo
Fordyce Village, Back Street, Corrie Cottage				57°39′41″N 2°44′44″W	Category C(S)	10594	Upload Photo
Fordyce Village, Church Street, Post Office Store				57°39′43″N 2°44′48″W	Category C(S)	10598	Upload Photo
Fordyce Village, School Road, Academy House And Garden Walls				57°39′39″N 2°44′44″W	Category B	10615	Upload Photo
Fordyce Village, St Tarquins Place, Kirkton Cottage And Outbuildings				57°39′39″N 2°44′48″W	Category C(S)	10619	Upload Photo
Fordyce Village, Bridge Street, Clifton Cottage				57°39′44″N 2°44′49″W	Category B	10630	Upload Photo
Fordyce Village, Church Street, Hamewith				57°39′42″N 2°44′43″W	Category C(S)	10645	Upload Photo
Fordyce Village, Church Street, Church Hall (Former Free Church)				57°39′41″N 2°44′40″W	Category C(S)	10646	Upload Photo
Glassaugh House Dovecot				57°40′15″N 2°44′27″W	Category A	10650	Upload Photo
12 Sandend				57°41′10″N 2°44′54″W	Category B	10669	Upload Photo
38 Sandend				57°41′09″N 2°44′51″W	Category B	10676	Upload Photo
Fishing Stores To Rear Of 18 Sandend				57°41′09″N 2°44′54″W	Category C(S)	10708	Upload Photo
21 Sandend				57°41′10″N 2°44′52″W	Category B	10710	Upload Photo
25 Sandend				57°41′09″N 2°44′52″W	Category C(S)	10712	Upload Photo
29 Sandend				57°41′09″N 2°44′52″W	Category C(S)	10715	Upload Photo
Findlater Castle, Dovecote				57°41′17″N 2°46′24″W	Category A	6759	Upload Photo
1 And A Half Sandend				57°41′12″N 2°44′55″W	Category B	6762	Upload Photo
56A Sandend				57°41′04″N 2°44′54″W	Category C(S)	6769	Upload Photo
Fordyce Village, St Tarquins, Church Street, Garden Store And Enclosing Walls				57°39′40″N 2°44′52″W	Category C(S)	10603	Upload Photo
Fordyce Village, Bridge Street, Bridge Over The Burn Of Fordyce				57°39′45″N 2°44′50″W	Category C(S)	10628	Upload Photo
Fordyce Village, Bridge Street, Bridge Cottage				57°39′45″N 2°44′50″W	Category C(S)	10629	Upload Photo
Fordyce Village, Church Street, Fordyce Parish Church (Church Of Scotland) And Enclosing Walls				57°39′38″N 2°44′56″W	Category B	10636	Upload Photo
Fordyce Village, Church Street, Old Lime Kilns				57°39′35″N 2°45′00″W	Category B	10637	Upload Photo
Fordyce Village, 4 East Church Street				57°39′43″N 2°44′45″W	Category C(S)	10647	Upload Photo
Glassaugh House Bridge Over The Burn Of Fordyce				57°40′12″N 2°44′29″W	Category B	10648	Upload Photo
Glassaugh House Walled Garden				57°40′16″N 2°44′30″W	Category C(S)	10649	Upload Photo
Sandend, Harbour And Breakwater				57°41′11″N 2°44′47″W	Category C(S)	10656	Upload Photo
7 Sandend				57°41′11″N 2°44′54″W	Category B	10664	Upload Photo
8 Sandend				57°41′11″N 2°44′54″W	Category C(S)	10665	Upload Photo
9 Sandend				57°41′11″N 2°44′54″W	Category C(S)	10666	Upload Photo
13 Sandend				57°41′10″N 2°44′54″W	Category C(S)	10670	Upload Photo
41 Sandend				57°41′08″N 2°44′50″W	Category C(S)	10679	Upload Photo
52 Sandend				57°41′06″N 2°44′52″W	Category C(S)	10686	Upload Photo
32 Sandend				57°41′09″N 2°44′53″W	Category C(S)	10716	Upload Photo
1A Sandend				57°41′12″N 2°44′54″W	Category B	6763	Upload Photo
Fordyce Village, Castle Lane (West Side) House At Angle With Church Street				57°39′42″N 2°44′46″W	Category B	10595	Upload Photo
Fordyce Village Church Street, Post Office House And Post Office				57°39′42″N 2°44′48″W	Category C(S)	10599	Upload Photo
Fordyce Village, Church Street, Old Smithy				57°39′42″N 2°44′50″W	Category B	10601	Upload Photo
Fordyce Village, School Road, Viewmount				57°39′42″N 2°44′43″W	Category C(S)	10617	Upload Photo
Fordyce Village, Back Street, South View				57°39′41″N 2°44′48″W	Category B	10626	Upload Photo
1 Sandend				57°41′12″N 2°44′54″W	Category C(S)	10657	Upload Photo
2 Sandend				57°41′12″N 2°44′54″W	Category B	10660	Upload Photo
56 Sandend, Gospel Hall (Former School)				57°41′04″N 2°44′54″W	Category C(S)	10689	Upload Photo
Glassaugh House				57°40′14″N 2°44′32″W	Category A	10694	Upload Photo
19 Sandend				57°41′10″N 2°44′52″W	Category B	10709	Upload Photo
23 Sandend				57°41′09″N 2°44′53″W	Category C(S)	10711	Upload Photo
28 Sandend				57°41′09″N 2°44′51″W	Category B	10714	Upload Photo
3A Sandend				57°41′12″N 2°44′55″W	Category C(S)	6766	Upload Photo
Fordyce Village, Old Parish Church Of St Talorgan And Walled Burial Ground				57°39′45″N 2°44′46″W	Category Scheduled Monument	SM352	Upload Photo
Fordyce Village, Church Street, Telephone Kiosk, By Post Office				57°39′42″N 2°44′48″W	Category C(S)	10597	Upload Photo
18 Sandend, The Haven And Fishing Store				57°41′10″N 2°44′54″W	Category C(S)	10634	Upload Photo
Fordyce Village, Church Street, Stand Pump On Pavement Beside Roseau				57°39′41″N 2°44′50″W	Category C(S)	10639	Upload Photo
Kilnhillock Farm Steading				57°40′46″N 2°46′43″W	Category B	10652	Upload Photo
Mill Of Durn				57°39′42″N 2°42′05″W	Category B	10653	Upload Photo
Mill Of Towie Farmhouse				57°40′14″N 2°48′02″W	Category C(S)	10654	Upload Photo
Portsoy, East Links, Old Ropery Complex Including Back Green Cottages				57°40′56″N 2°40′59″W	Category B	10655	Upload Photo
33 Sandend				57°41′08″N 2°44′52″W	Category C(S)	10671	Upload Photo
44 Sandend And Store				57°41′08″N 2°44′51″W	Category B	10681	Upload Photo
47 Sandend				57°41′08″N 2°44′51″W	Category C(S)	10684	Upload Photo
53 Sandend				57°41′06″N 2°44′53″W	Category C(S)	10687	Upload Photo
27 Sandend				57°41′09″N 2°44′52″W	Category B	10713	Upload Photo
13 And A Half Sandend				57°41′10″N 2°44′54″W	Category C(S)	6767	Upload Photo
Durn House And Gatepiers				57°40′25″N 2°41′32″W	Category B	10590	Upload Photo
Durn House Dovecot				57°40′27″N 2°41′29″W	Category B	10591	Upload Photo
Fordyce Village, 50 Church Street And Enclosing Walls				57°39′39″N 2°44′52″W	Category C(S)	10604	Upload Photo
Fordyce Village, School Road, Academy House, East Wing				57°39′39″N 2°44′44″W	Category C(S)	10616	Upload Photo
Durn Old Toll Cottage				57°40′19″N 2°41′17″W	Category C(S)	10622	Upload Photo
Fordyce Village, Fordyce Castle				57°39′43″N 2°44′46″W	Category A	10623	Upload Photo
Fordyce Castle, Stand Pump On Pavement Beside Castle				57°39′43″N 2°44′47″W	Category B	10624	Upload Photo
Fordyce Village, Bridge Street, Anvil Cottage				57°39′44″N 2°44′51″W	Category C(S)	10627	Upload Photo
17 Sandend				57°41′10″N 2°44′53″W	Category B	10633	Upload Photo
Glassaugh Lodge				57°40′15″N 2°44′33″W	Category B	10651	Upload Photo
Fish Smoking Kiln Opposite Gable End Of 1A Sandend				57°41′12″N 2°44′53″W	Category C(S)	10658	Upload Photo
3 Sandend				57°41′12″N 2°44′54″W	Category C(S)	10661	Upload Photo
4 Sandend				57°41′11″N 2°44′54″W	Category B	10662	Upload Photo
6 Sandend (Formerly 5 And 6 Sandend)				57°41′11″N 2°44′54″W	Category C(S)	10663	Upload Photo
35 Sandend				57°41′09″N 2°44′52″W	Category C(S)	10673	Upload Photo
46 Sandend				57°41′08″N 2°44′52″W	Category C(S)	10683	Upload Photo
48 Sandend				57°41′08″N 2°44′52″W	Category C(S)	10685	Upload Photo
Boyne Castle Dovecot				57°40′44″N 2°39′18″W	Category B	10587	Upload Photo
Fordyce Village, 42 Church Street				57°39′41″N 2°44′50″W	Category C(S)	10602	Upload Photo
15 Sandend				57°41′10″N 2°44′53″W	Category C(S)	10632	Upload Photo
Fordyce Village, Church Street, Roseau And Garden Walls				57°39′41″N 2°44′50″W	Category C(S)	10638	Upload Photo
Fordyce Village, Church Street, Dolen				57°39′42″N 2°44′47″W	Category C(S)	10642	Upload Photo
Fordyce Village, Church Street/School Road, Former Shop And Cottages				57°39′42″N 2°44′44″W	Category C(S)	10644	Upload Photo
Fish Smoking Kiln Opposite Gable End Of 1B Sandend				57°41′13″N 2°44′54″W	Category C(S)	10659	Upload Photo
11 Sandend				57°41′11″N 2°44′53″W	Category C(S)	10668	Upload Photo
37 Sandend And Fishing Store (Opposite)				57°41′09″N 2°44′51″W	Category C(S)	10675	Upload Photo
40 Sandend				57°41′09″N 2°44′50″W	Category C(S)	10678	Upload Photo
57 Sandend, Inchard				57°41′03″N 2°44′54″W	Category C(S)	10690	Upload Photo
1B Sandend				57°41′12″N 2°44′54″W	Category C(S)	6764	Upload Photo

== Key ==
The scheme for classifying buildings in Scotland is:

- Category A: "buildings of national or international importance, either architectural or historic; or fine, little-altered examples of some particular period, style or building type."
- Category B: "buildings of regional or more than local importance; or major examples of some particular period, style or building type, which may have been altered."
- Category C: "buildings of local importance; lesser examples of any period, style, or building type, as originally constructed or moderately altered; and simple traditional buildings which group well with other listed buildings."

In March 2016 there were 47,288 listed buildings in Scotland. Of these, 8% were Category A, and 50% were Category B, with the remaining 42% being Category C.

== See also ==
- List of listed buildings in Aberdeenshire
