= Henry Griffin (disambiguation) =

Henry Griffin (1786–1866) was an Irish Anglican bishop.

Henry Griffin may also refer to:

== People ==
- Henry L. Griffin, founder of a company that was a predecessor of the department store Fenwick Colchester
- Lepel Henry Griffin (1838–1908), British administrator and diplomat in India
- Henry Griffin (jockey), in the U.S. National Museum of Racing and Hall of Fame

== Characters ==
- Henry Griffin (The O.C.)
- Henry Griffin, in the TV series Unnatural History

== See also ==
- Harry Griffin (disambiguation)
- Henry Griffith (disambiguation)
