= Sir Robert Smith, 1st Baronet =

Scottish Unionist politician

Sir Robert Workman Smith, 1st Baronet, JP (7 December 1880 – 6 December 1957) was a Scottish Unionist politician.

The youngest son of George Smith, shipowner, Glasgow, he was educated at Trinity College, Cambridge. He was a barrister at the Inner Temple.

Smith was unsuccessful candidate for Aberdeen and Kincardine Central in 1922 and 1923, but was elected as the member of parliament (MP) for the seat at the third time of asking in 1924, holding it until 1945. His grandson and namesake, Sir Robert Smith, 3rd Baronet, was the Liberal Democrat MP for West Aberdeenshire and Kincardine from 1997 to 2015.

Smith was also a justice of the peace for the County of Aberdeen. He was knighted in 1934 Birthday Honours and created a baronet in the 1945 Dissolution Honours.

== Sources ==
- "Sir Robert Smith". The Times. 7 December 1957. p. 8.

Parliament of the United Kingdom
Preceded by Murdoch McKenzie Wood	Member of Parliament for Aberdeenshire Central; 1924–1945	Succeeded by Henry Spence
Baronetage of the United Kingdom
New creation	Baronet (of Crowmallie); 1945–1957	Succeeded by William Gordon Smith
