= Henry Griffith =

Henry Griffith may refer to:

- Henry W. Griffith (1897–1956), New York state senator
- Henry Griffith (priest) (1850–1932), Archdeacon of Lahore
- Sir Henry Griffith, 1st Baronet (died c. 1640), of the Griffith baronets
- Sir Henry Griffith, 2nd Baronet (died 1656), of the Griffith baronets
- Henry Griffith, owner of Beaumont College
- Lt. Col. Henry Griffith, see Order of Battle at the Balaclava campaign

== See also ==
- Harry Griffith (disambiguation)
- Henry Griffiths (disambiguation)
