= 1919 Aberdeenshire and Kincardineshire Central by-election =

UK parliamentary by-election

1919 Aberdeenshire and Kincardine Central by-election
- 16 April 1919 (Polling); 30 April 1919 (Declaration)
- Registered: 26,315
- Turnout: 50.1%
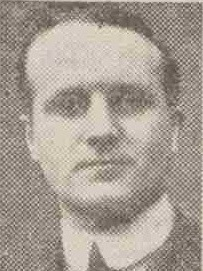
		Uni	Lab
Candidate	Murdoch McKenzie Wood	Leybourne Davidson	Joseph Forbes Duncan
Party	Liberal	Unionist	Labour
Alliance		Coalition	Ind. Labour Party
Popular vote	4,950	4,764	3,482
Percentage	37.5%	36.1%	26.4%
Swing	▼9.9%	▼16.5%	New
MP before election
Alexander Theodore Gordon
Unionist
Subsequent MP
Murdoch McKenzie Wood
Liberal

The 1919 Aberdeenshire and Kincardine Central by-election was a parliamentary by-election held for the British House of Commons constituency of Aberdeen and Kincardine Central on 16 April 1919.

== Background ==
The seat had become vacant when the Coalition Conservative Member of Parliament (MP) Alexander Theodore Gordon died on 6 March 1919 aged just 37, from heart failure after suffering from influenza. He had held the seat only since the 1918 general election.

According to reports in The Times, popular opinion was swinging against the coalition government of David Lloyd George and Bonar Law and the Independent, Asquithian Liberals were making the most of the government's diminishing popularity to revive.

=== Electoral history ===
General election 1918: Aberdeen and Kincardine Central
Party		Candidate	Votes	%
C	Unionist	Alexander Theodore Gordon	6,546	52.6
	Liberal	John Henderson	5,908	47.4
Majority			638	5.2
Turnout			12,454	47.3
Registered electors			26,315	
	Unionist win (new seat)			
C indicates candidate endorsed by the coalition government.

== Candidates ==
=== Coalition ===
The Liberal candidate at the 1918 general election, John Henderson, who had been Liberal MP for West Aberdeenshire since 1906 had only lost to Gordon by the narrow margin of 638 votes. Henderson had been expected to be the Liberals' by-election candidate. In fact, because of Henderson's strong showing at the general election and the traditional strength of the Liberal Party in the area, the Coalition whips were apparently prepared to endorse him for the by-election, giving him the equivalent of coalition coupon which had been offered to authorised candidates at the 1918 general election. Henderson, no doubt eager to return to Parliament, and fully supported by the local Liberal Association, had reportedly made his peace with Freddie Guest, Lloyd George's Chief Whip. However the local Conservatives were not happy with this arrangement and decided to stand their own candidate, Mr L F W Davidson. This situation proved depressing for the Coalition leaders and no 'coupon' was forthcoming for either Henderson or Davidson by the time the by-election writ was moved on 24 March.

=== Liberal ===
Henderson further muddied the waters by standing down as Liberal candidate and the local Association turned instead to Major Murdoch McKenzie Wood, a barrister and former Gordon Highlander, who had unsuccessfully fought Ayr Burghs at the 1918 general election. By the time the by-election campaigning was properly under way, the 'coupon', such as it was, had presumably been bestowed on Davidson as he was described in the election literature and the press as the Coalition Unionist or Coalition Conservative candidate.

=== Labour ===
The contest was a three-cornered affair, with Joseph F. Duncan, the general secretary of the Scottish Farm Servants' Union, fighting the seat for Labour.

== Result ==
Duncan's candidacy was expected to complicate the possible outcome of the election by splitting the anti-Coalition vote. In the event, this turned out to be the case but not by quite enough to deliver the seat to the Coalition candidate and Wood was returned to Parliament with a majority of 186 over Davidson.

Aberdeen and Kincardine Central by-election, 1919
Party		Candidate	Votes	%	±%
	Liberal	Murdoch McKenzie Wood	4,950	37.5	−9.9
C	Unionist	Leybourne Davidson	4,764	36.1	−16.5
	Labour	Joseph Forbes Duncan	3,482	26.4	New
Majority			186	1.4	N/A
Turnout			13,196	50.1	+2.8
Registered electors			26,315		
	Liberal gain from Unionist		Swing	+3.3	
C indicates candidate endorsed by the coalition government.

== Aftermath ==
The combined Liberal and Labour vote amounted to 63.9% of the poll and was clearly a severe blow to the Coalition, coming so soon after their overwhelming success in the 1918 general election and hard on the heels of other by-election defeats in Hull and Leyton West. As was pointed out in The Times, no Coalition seat could be considered safe given the temper of the electorate at the time and the Coalition coupon which had been a talisman for candidates a few short weeks before was turning into a curse.

== See also ==
- List of United Kingdom by-elections (1918–1931)
- United Kingdom by-election records
