= Harry Griffin =

Harry Griffin may refer to:

- A. Harry Griffin (1911–2004), British journalist and mountaineer
- Harry Griffin (cricketer) (1873–1938), English cricketer
- Harry Griffin, candidate in United States House of Representatives elections, 1940
- Harry Griffin, a character in You've Got It Coming
- Harry Griffin, a character in Bones of the Earth

== See also ==
- Harold Griffin (disambiguation)
- Henry Griffin (disambiguation)
- Harry Griffith (disambiguation)
