= Harry Devonald Griffith =

British physicist (1898–1964)

Harry Devonald Griffith FRSE (3 April 1898 – 11 April 1964) was a British physicist and author.

== Life ==
He was born in Clifton, Bristol, to John Devonald Griffith and his wife Alice. He was christened on 3 April 1898. He was educated at Bristol Grammar School. He then studied at Cambridge University graduating MA.

He taught Medical Physics at Aberdeen University from 1923 to 1964. He lived at 21 Gladstone Place in Aberdeen. In 1954 he was elected a Fellow of the Royal Society of Edinburgh. His proposers were Alexander Geddes, Charles Strachan, Edward Maitland Wright, and Vero Wynne-Edwards.

He died on 11 April 1964.

== Publications ==
- An Introduction to the Theory and Use of the Microscope (1928) with Charles Robertshaw Marshall

== Family ==
In 1933 he married Jessie M. Jack.
