= Harold Griffin =

Harold Griffin may refer to:

- Harold Griffin (American football), American football player
- Harold Griffin, winner of the Rhodes Scholarship
- Harold Griffin, actor in The Luck of the Irish

== See also ==
- Harry Griffin (disambiguation)
- Harold Griffen, American football player
