= Mary Anne Barker =

English journalist and poet, 1831–1911

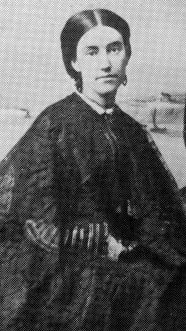
- Mary Anne Barker with her husband Frederick Napier Broome, c. 1866
- Born: 29 January 1831; Spanish Town, Jamaica
- Died: 6 March 1911 (aged 80)
- Occupation: Author
- Spouse(s): Captain George Robert Barker (m. 1852), Frederick Napier Broome (m. 1865, d. 1896)
- Children: 2

Mary Anne Barker, Lady Barker (29 January 1831 – 6 March 1911), later Mary Anne Broome, Lady Broome, was an English author. She wrote mainly about life in New Zealand.

== Biography ==
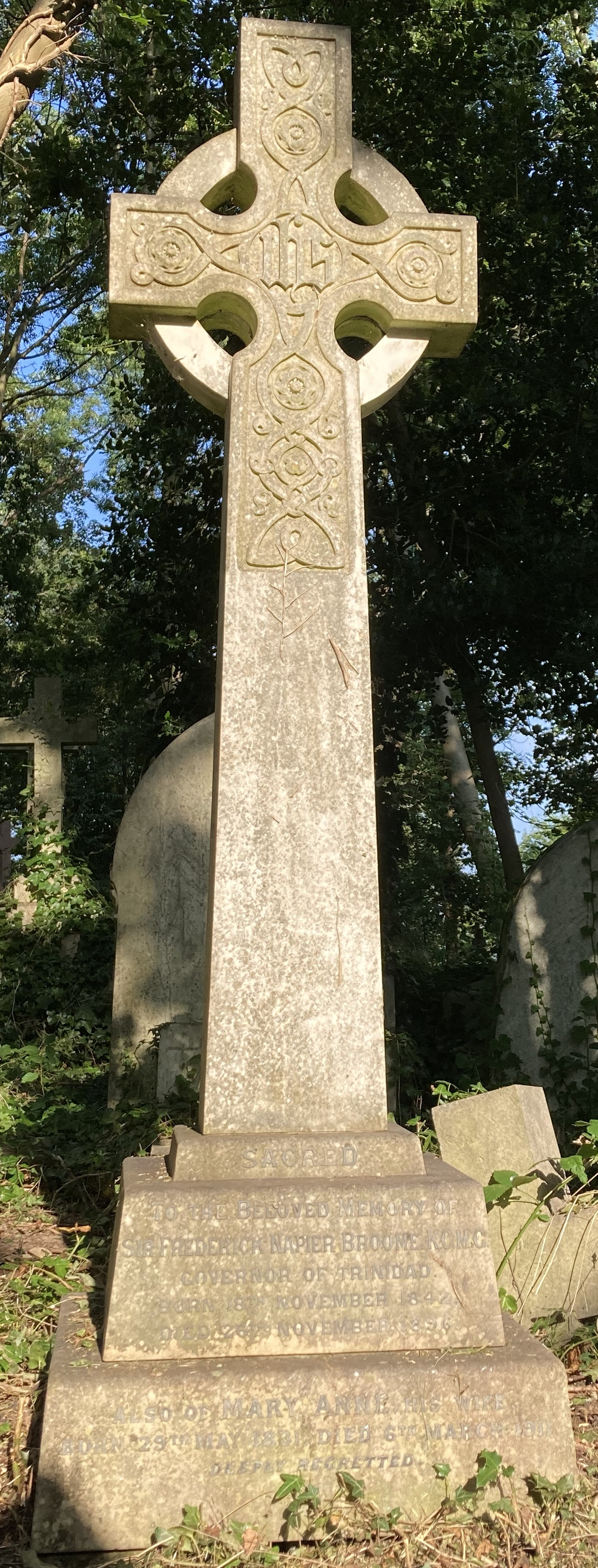
Grave of Mary Anne Barker in Highgate Cemetery

Born Mary Anne Stewart in Spanish Town, Jamaica, she was the eldest daughter of Walter Steward, Island Secretary of Jamaica. She was educated in England, and in 1852 married Captain George Robert Barker of the Royal Artillery, with whom she had two children. When Barker was knighted for his leadership at the Siege of Lucknow in 1857, Mary Anne became "Lady Barker". Eight months later Barker died.

On 21 June 1865, Mary Anne Barker married Frederick Napier Broome. The couple then sailed for New Zealand, leaving her two children in England. The couple's first child was born in Christchurch in February 1866, but died in May. By this time, they had moved to the sheep station Steventon, which Broome had partnered with H. P. Hill to buy. They remained there for three years; they lost more than half their sheep in the winter of 1867, and in response Broome sold out and the couple returned to London.

Both Mary Anne and her husband then became journalists. Still calling herself "Lady Barker", Mary Anne Broome became a correspondent for The Times and published two books of verse: Poems from New Zealand (1868) and The Stranger from Seriphos (1869).

In 1870, she published Station Life in New Zealand, a collection of her letters home. The book was successful, going through several editions and being translated into French and German. She commented that

The common saying in New Zealand is, that people only die from drowning and drunkenness. I am afraid that the former is generally the result of the latter.

Over the next eight years, Lady Barker wrote ten more books, including A Christmas Cake in Four Quarters (1871), a sequel to Station Life entitled Station Amusements in New Zealand (1873), and First Lessons in the Principles of Cooking (1874). This last title led to her being appointed Lady Superintendent of the National Training School of Cooking in South Kensington.

When Frederick Broome was appointed Colonial Secretary of Natal in 1875, Lady Barker accompanied him there. Broome's subsequent colonial appointments had him travelling to Mauritius, Western Australia, Barbados, and Trinidad. Drawing on these experiences, Lady Barker published A Year's Housekeeping in South Africa (1877) and Letters to Guy (1885).

Frederick Broome was knighted on 3 July 1884, and thereafter Mary Anne called herself "Lady Broome". She published the last of her 22 books, Colonial Memories under this name. After Sir Frederick Broome's death in 1896, Lady Broome returned to London, dying there on 6 March 1911.

She is buried with her husband Frederick on the eastern side of Highgate Cemetery.

== Works ==
- Station Life in New Zealand (Whitcomb and Tombs, 1870, reprinted 1950)
- Station Amusements in New Zealand (1873)
- A Year's Housekeeping in South Africa (Macmillan, 1877)
- The Bedroom and Boudoir (1878)
