= James Davidson (British politician) =

British politician (1927-2017)

Member of Parliament for Aberdeenshire West
- In office 31 March 1966 – 29 May 1970
- Preceded by: Forbes Hendry
- Succeeded by: Colin Campbell Mitchell

Personal details
- Born: 10 January 1927
- Died: 29 June 2017 (aged 90)
- Party: Liberal

James Duncan Gordon Davidson (10 January 1927 – 29 June 2017) was a British Liberal politician and farmer. He served as Member of Parliament for Aberdeenshire West from 1966 to 1970, when he chose not to stand again because of a family illness.

== Before politics ==
Davidson's father was naval captain Alastair Gordon Davidson, of a gentry family of Tillychetly and Dess, formerly of Inchmarlo, all in Aberdeenshire. Captain Davidson's father, Henry Oliver Duncan Davidson (1854–1915) was 4th of Tillychetly; his eldest son Duncan Gordon, 5th of Tillychetly, inherited Dess from a cousin, becoming 7th of that place. James Davidson succeeded his uncle Duncan in 1954, becoming 6th of Tillychetly. Henry Oliver Duncan Davidson was a teacher and housemaster at Harrow School; he was the first housemaster of Winston Churchill.

Alastair Davidson had married (Mildred) Valentine Blomfield, daughter of Colonel Frederick William Osborne, Royal Australian Artillery, of Sydney, Australia. Davidson was born at Chatham, Kent, where his father was commissioning a new vessel.

Davidson served as a naval officer and naval attache at the British Embassy in Moscow before establishing himself as an Aberdeenshire farmer. He was educated at the Royal Naval College, Dartmouth and Downing College, Cambridge, where he studied for a Certificate of Competence in Russian. In 2003, he published a book about Scottish Naval History, Scots and the Sea: A Nation's Lifeblood. Whilst a Lieutenant in the Royal Navy, he served aboard HMS Vanguard, a battleship prepared for the Royal cruise to South Africa; he danced with Queen Elizabeth and Princesses Elizabeth and Margaret, and attended Princess Elizabeth's twenty-first birthday party. For this and his other naval service, he was awarded the M.V.O. Davidson retired from the Royal Navy in 1954, in which year he succeeded his uncle Duncan as head of the family, inherited Tillychetly and its farmlands, and married Katherine, secretary to the Canadian chargé d'affaires and daughter of William Jamieson, of Ontario, Canada.

== Parliament ==
In his new role as a landed farmer, having taught himself the agricultural business and being elected to the North-east Area Executive of the National Farmers' Union, Davidson was selected to fight Aberdeenshire West for the Liberals. During the 1966 general election campaign one of Davidson's main policy points was the establishment of a development authority for the North East of Scotland (on the lines of the Highlands and Islands Development Board) and he was a strong advocate on behalf of small farmers and of improving communications in remote areas like the Highlands by improving road links to the major cities. He also campaigned for better air and sea links with Scandinavia.

Davidson was Liberal spokesman on foreign affairs and defence issues in Parliament, a particularly important brief given the ongoing war in Vietnam and the arguments over Britain's role East of Suez. In February 1967, he took a leading role in the opposition to the government's plans to raise fees for foreign students at British universities and introduced a Bill to give the people of Scotland and Wales referendums on devolution. This was as part of the Liberal strategy to draw the sting of the increasing popularity of the Scottish National Party and re-establish the Liberal position on 'home rule all round' with the Scottish electorate.

== 1970 general election ==
When Davidson stood down from Parliament his constituency was contested at the 1970 general election by Laura Grimond, wife of Liberal leader Jo Grimond. Although the overall strength of the Liberal Party in the House of Commons after that election plummeted from 13 to just six MPs, had Davidson stood again he may nonetheless have retained the seat, possibly even with an increased majority, based on his record as a strong and popular local MP. Despite Davidson's campaigning alongside Mrs Grimond, the seat was gained for the Conservatives by Colonel Colin 'Mad Mitch' Mitchell formerly of the Argyll and Sutherland Highlanders, who had proved his bravery serving under fire in Aden. Although Mitchell's majority was more than 5000 votes, and the Liberal Party lost another Highland seat at Ross and Cromarty, and even Jo Grimond's majority in Orkney and Shetland was reduced to its lowest-ever level, the opinion of The Times reporter that Davidson could have held on may nevertheless have been well-founded, given the area's traditional respect for "one of their own" and some reluctance at the time to accept a female alternative as MP.

== Later life ==
When Grimond stood down as leader of the Liberal Party in 1967 he apparently asked Davidson if he wanted to be a candidate for the leadership but Davidson reported that he thought Grimond had put this question to every one of the twelve MPs in the Liberal Parliamentary Party. He declined to stand himself and, with misgivings, voted for Jeremy Thorpe as the most experienced candidate.

With effect from 1 October 1970, Davidson was appointed to be chief executive of the Royal Highland and Agricultural Society of Scotland and he continued in the post until 1991. He was awarded the O.B.E. in 1984 for his work in this field.

Davidson died, aged 90, on 29 June 2017. Having remarried in 1973 to Janet Stafford following his divorce, Davidson was survived by his second wife, his children from both marriages, and grandchildren.

== Other sources ==
- Leigh Rayment's Peerage Page
- Who's Who – OUP, 2007

Parliament of the United Kingdom
Preceded by Forbes Hendry	Member of Parliament for Aberdeenshire West; 1966–1970	Succeeded by Colin Campbell Mitchell
