= Talarican =

Talarican (Tarkin) was a Scottish Bishop of Sodor (a diocese including the western islands of Scotland) of the eighth century.

== Biography ==
He was probably of purely Pictish origin, though the Aberdeen Breviary (1509) says he was born in Ireland. The legend in the Breviary states that he was raised to the episcopate by Pope Gregory; and Adam King's Kalendar (1558) styles him "bischop and confess. in Scotland under King Solvathius".

The Bollandists, following the chronology of the Dalriadic kings as adopted by Pinkerton and Skene, place the reign of Selvach from 706 to 726; and, as Gregory II was pope from 715 to 731, conclude that Talarican became bishop about 720, a few years after the Columban monks of Iona had been induced by St. Egbert to conform to the Roman Rite. He is said to have offered Mass every day, to have been noted for his zeal and his mortified life, and to have converted many pagans in the northern coasts of Scotland through his preaching and example. According to Dempster, he died in the island of Lismore.

== Veneration ==
Talarican is considered a Catholic and Eastern Orthodox saint, and many churches subsequently founded in the Dioceses of Moray, Ross, and Aberdeen were dedicated in his honour. His name is perpetuated in the district of Kiltarlity (Inverness-shire), the church and cemetery of Ceilltarraglan (Skye), and wells still known as "St. Tarkin's" at Fordyce, Kilsyth, and elsewhere. His feast day is 30 October.
