= Willie Wiseman =

Scottish footballer

Personal information
- Full name: William Wiseman
- Date of birth: 18 October 1896
- Place of birth: Turriff, Scotland
- Date of death: 1981 (aged 84–85)
- Place of death: Edinburgh, Scotland
- Height: 5 ft 11 in (1.80 m)
- Position: Left back

Senior career*
Years	Team	Apps	(Gls)
–1914	Hawthorn		
1914	Aberdeen	0	(0)
1914–	Hawthorn		
–1922	Aberdeen University		
1922	Aberdeen	0	(0)
1922–1930	Queen's Park	264	(0)

International career
1926–1930	Scotland	2	(0)
1926–1930	Scotland Amateurs	6	(0)
1927	Scottish League XI	1	(0)
- * Club domestic league appearances and goals

William Wiseman (18 October 1896 – 1981) was a Scottish amateur footballer who played as a left back in the Scottish League for Queen's Park and later served on the club's committee. He was capped by Scotland at amateur and full international levels.

== Personal life ==
Wiseman was educated at Fordyce Academy and Aberdeen University and left the latter institution in 1916 to serve in the First World War with the Gordon Highlanders. During his time on the Western Front, he was gassed, wounded and posted missing for a week. He rose to the rank of captain and also served as a lieutenant in the Tank Corps. After the war, he went to India to assist with the restructuring of the British Indian Army.

After leaving the army, Wiseman completed his studies at Glasgow Technical College and later worked as an Assistant Roads Surveyor for Dunbartonshire Council. He took up a Deputy County Surveyor position in Banffshire in 1930, which brought his senior football career to an end. Wiseman also married in 1930 and had one son. He served as a major in the Royal Engineers during the Second World War, recruiting and training personnel at Redford Barracks and then working on infrastructure projects Iceland and Cardiff. After retiring from his role as County Roads Surveyor with Banffshire Council, Wiseman retired to Edinburgh.

== Honours ==
Queen's Park

- Scottish League Division Two: 1922–23

== See also ==
- List of solved missing person cases
