= Henry Griffiths =

Henry Griffiths may refer to:

- Bob Griffiths (writer) (Henry Robert Griffiths), born April 16, 1938, is an author, playwright, and speaker
- H. W. Griffiths, photographer

== See also ==
- Harry Griffiths (disambiguation)
- Henry Griffith (disambiguation)
