= West Aberdeenshire =

Parliamentary constituency in the United Kingdom, 1950–1983

- Former county constituency for the House of Commons
- Subdivisions of Scotland: Aberdeenshire

1950–1983
- Seats: One
- Created from: West Aberdeenshire & Kincardineshire; Central Aberdeenshire & Kincardineshire
- Replaced by: Gordon, Kincardine & Deeside and Aberdeen North

1868–1918
- Seats: One
- Type of constituency: County constituency
- Created from: Aberdeenshire; Aberdeen
- Replaced by: West Aberdeenshire & Kincardineshire; Central Aberdeenshire & Kincardineshire

West (or Western) Aberdeenshire was a Scottish county constituency of the House of Commons of the Parliament of the United Kingdom from 1868 to 1918 and from 1950 to 1983. It elected one Member of Parliament (MP) by the first past the post system of election.

During the period 1918 to 1950, the area of the constituency was divided between West Aberdeenshire and Kincardineshire and Central Aberdeenshire and Kincardineshire.

In 1983, the West Aberdeenshire constituency was replaced by Kincardine and Deeside.

== Boundaries ==
=== Western Aberdeenshire, 1885 to 1918 ===
==== 1868 to 1885 ====
When created by the Representation of the People (Scotland) Act 1868, and first used in the 1868 general election, the Western Aberdeenshire constituency was nominally one of three covering the county of Aberdeen. The other two were the county constituency of Eastern Aberdeenshire and the burgh constituency of Aberdeen. The county had been covered previously by the Aberdeenshire constituency and the Aberdeen constituency.

Western Aberdeenshire was defined by the 1868 legislation as consisting of the parishes of Aboyne and Glentanner, Alford, Auchindoir and Kearn, Auchterless, Birse, Chapel of Garioch, Clatt, Cluny, Coull, Crathie and Braemar, Culsalmond, Drumblade, Dyce, Echt, Forgue, Glenbucket, Glenmuick, Tullich and Glengairn, Huntly, Insch, Inverurie, Keig, Kemnay, Kildrummy, Kincardine O'Neil, Kinnellar, Kennethmont, Kintore, Leochel-Cushnie, Leslie, Logie-Coldstone, Lumphanan, Midmar, Monymusk, Newhills, Oyne, Peterculter, Premnay, Rayne, Rhynie, Skene, Strathdon, Tarland and Migvie, Tough, Towie, Tullynesle and Forbes, together with the part of the parish of Old Machar lying west of the River Don, and the parts of the parishes of Banchory-Devenick, Cabrach, Cairnie, Drumoak and Glass within the County of Aberdeen, and the parish of Gartly in Banffshire.

1868 boundaries were also used in the 1874 general election and the 1880 general election.

==== 1885 to 1918 ====
For the 1885 general election the burgh constituencies of Aberdeen North and Aberdeen South were created. Both of these new constituencies included areas beyond the boundaries of the burgh of Aberdeen.

1885 boundaries were also used in the 1886 general election, the 1892 general election, the 1895 general election, the 1900 general election, the 1906 general election, the January 1910 general election and the December 1910 general election.

County boundaries were redefined under the Local Government (Scotland) Act 1889, and the county of city of Aberdeen was created in 1900, but these developments did not affect constituency boundaries.

In 1918, the Representation of the People Act 1918 created new constituency boundaries, taking account of new local government boundaries, and grouped the county of Aberdeen, the county of city of Aberdeen and the county of Kincardine in the creation of new constituencies for the 1918 general election. Thus the Western Aberdeenshire area was divided between West Aberdeenshire and Kincardineshire and Central Aberdeenshire and Kincardineshire.

=== West Aberdeenshire, 1950 to 1983 ===
==== 1950 to 1955 ====
The House of Commons (Redistribution of Seats) Act 1949 created new boundaries for the 1950 general election, and West Aberdeenshire was created as one of four constituencies covering the county of Aberdeen and the county of city of Aberdeen. West Aberdeenshire and East Aberdeenshire were entirely within the county of Aberdeen, and Aberdeen North and Aberdeen South were entirely within the county of city of Aberdeen. West Aberdeenshire consisted of the burghs of Ballater, Inverurie, Kintore, and Oldmeldrum, and the districts of Aberdeen, Alford, Deeside, and Garioch.

The same boundaries were used for the 1951 general election.

==== 1955 to 1983 ====
For the 1955 general election, West Aberdeenshire was enlarged to include the burgh of Huntly and the district of Huntly, which were previously within East Aberdeenshire.

West Aberdeenshire retained the same boundaries for the 1959 general election, the 1964 general election, the 1966 general election, the 1970 general election, the February 1974 general election and the October 1974 general election.

In 1975, throughout Scotland, under the Local Government (Scotland) Act 1973, counties and burghs were abolished as local government areas, and West Aberdeenshire became a constituency within the Grampian region.

The 1979 general election was held before a review of constituency boundaries took account of new local government boundaries.

For the 1983 general election, the West Aberdeenshire constituency was replaced by Kincardine and Deeside.

== Members of Parliament ==
=== Western Aberdeenshire, 1868 to 1918 ===
Election	Member	Party
1868	William McCombie	Liberal
1876	Lord Douglas Gordon	Liberal
1880	Robert Farquharson	Liberal
1906	John Henderson	Liberal
1918	constituency abolished	

=== West Aberdeenshire, 1950 to 1983 ===
Election	Member	Party
1950	Henry Spence	Unionist
1959	Forbes Hendry	Conservative
1966	James Davidson	Liberal
1970	Colin Mitchell	Conservative
Feb 1974	Sir Russell Fairgrieve	Conservative
1983	constituency abolished	

== Election results 1868-1918 ==
=== Elections in the 1860s ===
1868 general election: Aberdeenshire Western
Party	Candidate	Votes	%	±%
Liberal	William McCombie	Unopposed		
Registered electors		4,081		
Liberal win (new seat)				

=== Elections in the 1870s ===
1874 general election: West Aberdeenshire
Party	Candidate	Votes	%	±%
Liberal	William McCombie	2,401	88.0	N/A
Conservative	Edward Ross	326	12.0	New
Majority		2,075	76.0	N/A
Turnout		2,727	69.0	N/A
Registered electors		3,954		
Liberal hold		Swing		

McCombie resigned, causing a by-election.

By-election 1876: West Aberdeenshire
Party	Candidate	Votes	%	±%
Liberal	Douglas Gordon	2,343	74.2	−13.8
Conservative	Col. Thomas Innes of Learney	813	25.8	+13.8
Majority		1,530	48.4	−27.6
Turnout		3,156	80.9	+11.9
Registered electors		3,899		
Liberal hold		Swing	-13.8	

=== Elections in the 1880s ===
1880 general election: Aberdeenshire Western
Party	Candidate	Votes	%	±%
Liberal	Robert Farquharson	2,390	69.6	−18.4
Conservative	William Forbes	1,042	30.4	+18.4
Majority		1,348	39.2	−36.8
Turnout		3,432	82.6	+13.6
Registered electors		4,155		
Liberal hold		Swing	-18.4	

1885 general election: Aberdeenshire Western
Party	Candidate	Votes	%	±%
Liberal	Robert Farquharson	4,248	54.6	−15.0
Conservative	Francis Hugh Irvine, jun.	2,010	25.8	−4.6
Scottish Farmers' Alliance	Quintin Kerr	1,530	19.6	New
Majority		2,238	28.8	−10.4
Turnout		7,788	76.8	−5.8
Registered electors		10,144		
Liberal hold		Swing	−5.3	

1886 general election: Aberdeenshire Western
Party	Candidate	Votes	%	±%
Liberal	Robert Farquharson	3,854	69.9	+15.3
Conservative	Francis Hugh Irvine, jun.	1,657	30.1	+4.3
Majority		2,197	39.8	+11.0
Turnout		5,511	54.3	−22.5
Registered electors		10,144		
Liberal hold		Swing	+5.5	

=== Elections in the 1890s ===
1892 general election: Aberdeenshire Western
Party	Candidate	Votes	%	±%
Liberal	Robert Farquharson	3,720	50.5	−19.4
Conservative	Arthur Henry Grant	3,640	49.5	+19.4
Majority		80	1.0	−38.8
Turnout		7,360	73.4	+19.1
Registered electors		10,027		
Liberal hold		Swing	-19.4	

1895 general election: Aberdeenshire Western
Party	Candidate	Votes	%	±%
Liberal	Robert Farquharson	4,187	51.3	+0.8
Conservative	Arthur Henry Grant	3,967	48.7	−0.8
Majority		220	2.6	+1.6
Turnout		8,154	79.9	+6.5
Registered electors		10,208		
Liberal hold		Swing	+0.8	

=== Elections in the 1900s ===
1900 general election: Aberdeenshire Western
Party	Candidate	Votes	%	±%
Liberal	Robert Farquharson	4,352	57.5	+6.2
Conservative	Arthur Henry Grant	3,213	42.5	−6.2
Majority		1,139	15.0	+12.4
Turnout		7,565	71.0	−8.9
Registered electors		10,656		
Liberal hold		Swing	+6.2	

Henderson

1906 general election: Aberdeenshire Western
Party	Candidate	Votes	%	±%
Liberal	John Henderson	5,949	68.1	+10.6
Conservative	Ronald McNeill	2,791	31.9	−10.6
Majority		3,158	36.2	+21.2
Turnout		8,740	81.7	+10.7
Registered electors		10,704		
Liberal hold		Swing	+10.6	

=== Elections in the 1910s ===
January 1910 general election: Aberdeenshire Western
Party	Candidate	Votes	%	±%
Liberal	John Henderson	5,901	64.9	−3.2
Unionist	George Smith	3,194	35.1	+3.2
Majority		2,707	29.8	−6.4
Turnout		9,095	83.8	+2.1
Registered electors		10,848		
Liberal hold		Swing	−3.2	

December 1910 general election: Aberdeenshire Western
Party	Candidate	Votes	%	±%
Liberal	John Henderson	5,415	62.6	−2.3
Unionist	George Smith	3,232	37.4	+2.3
Majority		2,183	25.2	−4.6
Turnout		8,647	79.2	−4.6
Registered electors		10,914		
Liberal hold		Swing	-2.3	

== Election results 1950-79 ==
=== Elections in the 1950s ===
1950 general election: West Aberdeenshire
Party	Candidate	Votes	%	±%
Unionist	Henry Spence	17,550	55.6	
Labour	Tom Oswald	7,298	23.1	
Liberal	Ivor Davies	6,740	21.3	
Majority		10,252	32.5	
Turnout		31,588	80.8	
Unionist win (new seat)				

1951 general election: West Aberdeenshire
Party	Candidate	Votes	%	±%
Unionist	Henry Spence	17,761	55.2	−0.4
Labour	Norman Hogg	7,278	22.6	−0.5
Liberal	Maitland Mackie	7,128	22.2	+0.9
Majority		10,483	32.6	+0.1
Turnout		32,167	78.3	−2.5
Unionist hold		Swing		

1955 general election: West Aberdeenshire
Party	Candidate	Votes	%	±%
Unionist	Henry Spence	20,216	59.1	+3.9
Labour	Mary MacNeil	9,288	27.1	+4.5
Liberal	Ronnie Fraser	4,705	13.8	−8.4
Majority		10,928	31.9	−0.7
Turnout		34,209	72.6	−5.7
Unionist hold		Swing		

1959 general election: West Aberdeenshire
Party	Candidate	Votes	%	±%
Unionist	Forbes Hendry	22,937	68.5	+9.4
Labour	William Kemp	10,542	31.5	+4.4
Majority		12,395	37.0	+5.1
Turnout		33,479	72.1	−0.5
Unionist hold		Swing		

=== Elections in the 1960s ===
1964 general election: West Aberdeenshire
Party	Candidate	Votes	%	±%
Unionist	Forbes Hendry	16,429	46.4	−21.9
Liberal	James Davidson	11,754	33.2	New
Labour	Kenneth A Munro	7,203	20.4	−11.1
Majority		4,675	13.2	−23.8
Turnout		35,386		
Unionist hold		Swing		

1966 general election: West Aberdeenshire
Party	Candidate	Votes	%	±%
Liberal	James Davidson	15,151	43.2	+10.0
Conservative	Forbes Hendry	13,956	39.7	−6.7
Labour	John Henderson	6,008	17.1	−3.3
Majority		1,195	3.5	N/A
Turnout		35,115	76.3	
Liberal gain from Conservative		Swing	+1.7	

=== Elections in the 1970s ===
1970 general election: West Aberdeenshire
Party	Candidate	Votes	%	±%
Conservative	Colin Mitchell	18,396	46.6	+6.9
Liberal	Laura Grimond	12,847	32.5	−10.7
Labour	Walter William Hay	6,141	15.5	−1.6
SNP	John Gerard McKinlay	2,112	5.3	New
Majority		5,549	14.1	N/A
Turnout		39,496	75.0	−1.3
Conservative gain from Liberal		Swing	+4.5	

February 1974 general election: Aberdeenshire West
Party	Candidate	Votes	%	±%
Conservative	Russell Fairgrieve	17,256	38.9	−7.7
Liberal	David C.P. Gracie	15,616	35.2	+2.7
SNP	Nicol Suttar	6,827	15.4	+10.1
Labour	C. William Ellis	4,661	10.5	−5.0
Majority		1,640	3.7	−10.4
Turnout		51,573	81.1	+6.1
Conservative hold		Swing		

October 1974 general election: Aberdeenshire West
Party	Candidate	Votes	%	±%
Conservative	Russell Fairgrieve	15,111	35.7	−3.2
Liberal	David C.P. Gracie	12,643	29.9	−5.3
SNP	Nicol Suttar	9,409	22.2	+6.8
Labour	C. William Ellis	5,185	12.2	+1.7
Majority		2,468	5.8	+2.1
Turnout		51,573	76.5	−4.6
Conservative hold		Swing		

1979 general election: Aberdeenshire West
Party	Candidate	Votes	%	±%
Conservative	Russell Fairgrieve	21,086	40.9	+5.2
Liberal	Malcolm Bruce	18,320	35.5	+5.6
Labour	George Grant	7,907	15.3	+3.1
SNP	John Hulbert	4,260	8.3	−13.9
Majority		2,766	5.4	−0.4
Turnout		51,573	75.9	−0.6
Conservative hold		Swing		

== See also ==
- Former United Kingdom Parliament constituencies
