= Forbes Hendry =

Alexander Forbes Hendry (24 October 1908 – 18 November 1980) was a Scottish Conservative Party politician.

He was Member of Parliament (MP) for Aberdeenshire West from 1959 to 1966, when the seat was won by Liberal candidate James Davidson at the general election that year; with a majority of 1,195 votes and a 10% swing.

Parliament of the United Kingdom
| Preceded by Henry Spence | Member of Parliament for Aberdeenshire West; 1959 – 1966 | Succeeded by James Davidson |
