= Robert Farquharson (politician) =

Scottish doctor and politician (1836–1918)

The Right Honourable Robert Farquharson
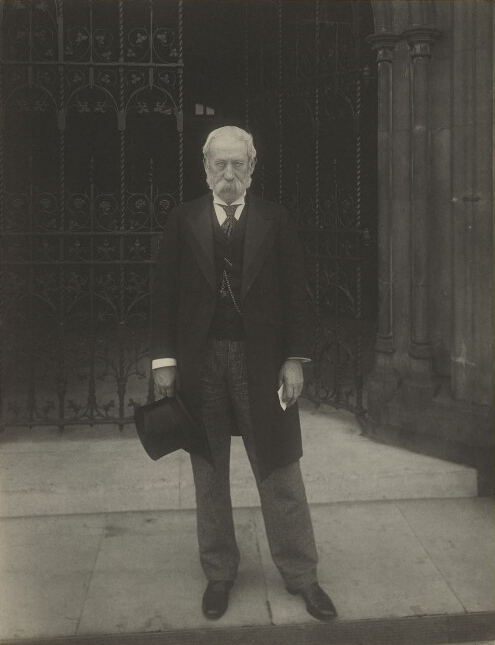
- Farquharson in 1898.

Member of Parliament for West Aberdeenshire
- In office 31 March 1880 – 12 January 1906
- Preceded by: Douglas Gordon
- Succeeded by: John Henderson

Personal details
- Born: 21 June 1836 Edinburgh, Scotland
- Died: 8 June 1918 (aged 81) Finzean, Aberdeenshire, Scotland
- Party: Liberal
- Education: University of Edinburgh
- Military career
- Allegiance: United Kingdom
- Branch: British Army
- Service years: 1859-1868
- Rank: Assistant Surgeon

Robert Farquharson (21 June 1836 – 8 June 1918) was a Scottish medical doctor and Liberal politician, who served as the Member of Parliament (MP) for Aberdeenshire West for 25 years.

== Early life and education ==
Farquharson was born in Edinburgh, the second eldest of six sons, to Francis Farquharson of Finzean (1802-1876), a well-known ophthalmic surgeon, and his wife Alison Mary (née Ainslie) (1802-1863). Alison was the daughter of Robert Ainslie, a close friend of the poet Robert Burns.

Farquharson was educated at Edinburgh Academy, before receiving his medical education at the University of Edinburgh, where he graduated with an MD in 1858, presenting the thesis "On the parasite diseases of the scalp".

== Military & medical career ==
In 1859 Farquharson became an assistant surgeon in the Royal Artillery, but was attached to the Coldstream Guards later that year. Upon his retirement in 1868, he became the medical officer for Rugby School in Warwickshire, as well as serving as hon. assistant surgeon for the 3rd Warwickshire Rifle Volunteer Corps. After spending time visiting medical schools across Europe, he moved to London in 1874, working as a physician at St Mary's Hospital and the Belgrave Hospital for Children in London. He also served as a lecturer for St Mary's Hospital School. Farquharson became a Fellow of the Royal College of Physicians in London in 1877. In 1878 he was elected a member of the Harveian Society of Edinburgh and served as president in 1901. He was also a Justice of the peace and was appointed a Deputy Lieutenant for Aberdeenshire in the same year.

== Political career ==
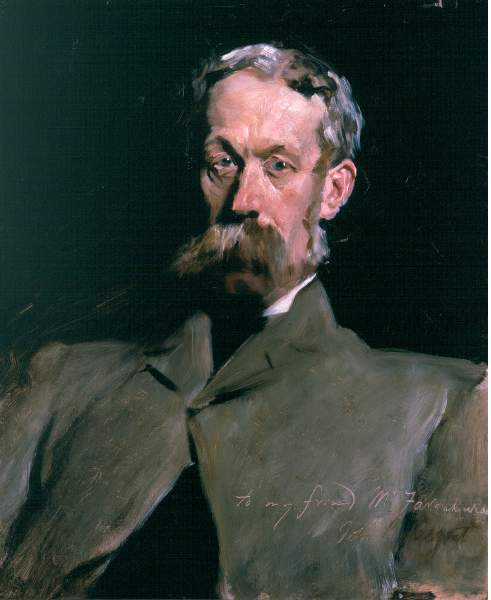
Dr. Robert Farquharson of Finzean (1875-1899), John Singer Sargent, 1881

Following the death of his father in 1876, Farquharson became the proprietor of the family estate and home, Finzean House. Upon his return to Aberdeenshire, he was twice considered as a candidate for by-elections in the constituencies of West Aberdeenshire and Glasgow and Aberdeen Universities. He eventually decided to stand for West Aberdeenshire at the 1880 general election and was subsequently elected.

Given his medical background, Farquharson became well known in the House of Commons for his work in medical and science affairs, and often served on committees involved in a range of issues, including the Contagious Diseases Act. He was strongly opposed to granting the right to vote to women. Additionally, he was chairman of the Private Bills Committee and the Scottish Liberal Party during his final session. From 1898 to 1899, he served as chairman of the Parliamentary Bills Committee of the B.M.A. In 1884, he was a guest at Haddo House for a dinner hosted by John Hamilton-Gordon, 1st Marquess of Aberdeen and Temair in honour of William Ewart Gladstone on his tour of Scotland. Farquharson was re-elected five times, although his majority in 1886 was down to 80. In 1905 he announced he would stand down at the following election, and he was succeeded by John Henderson in 1906.

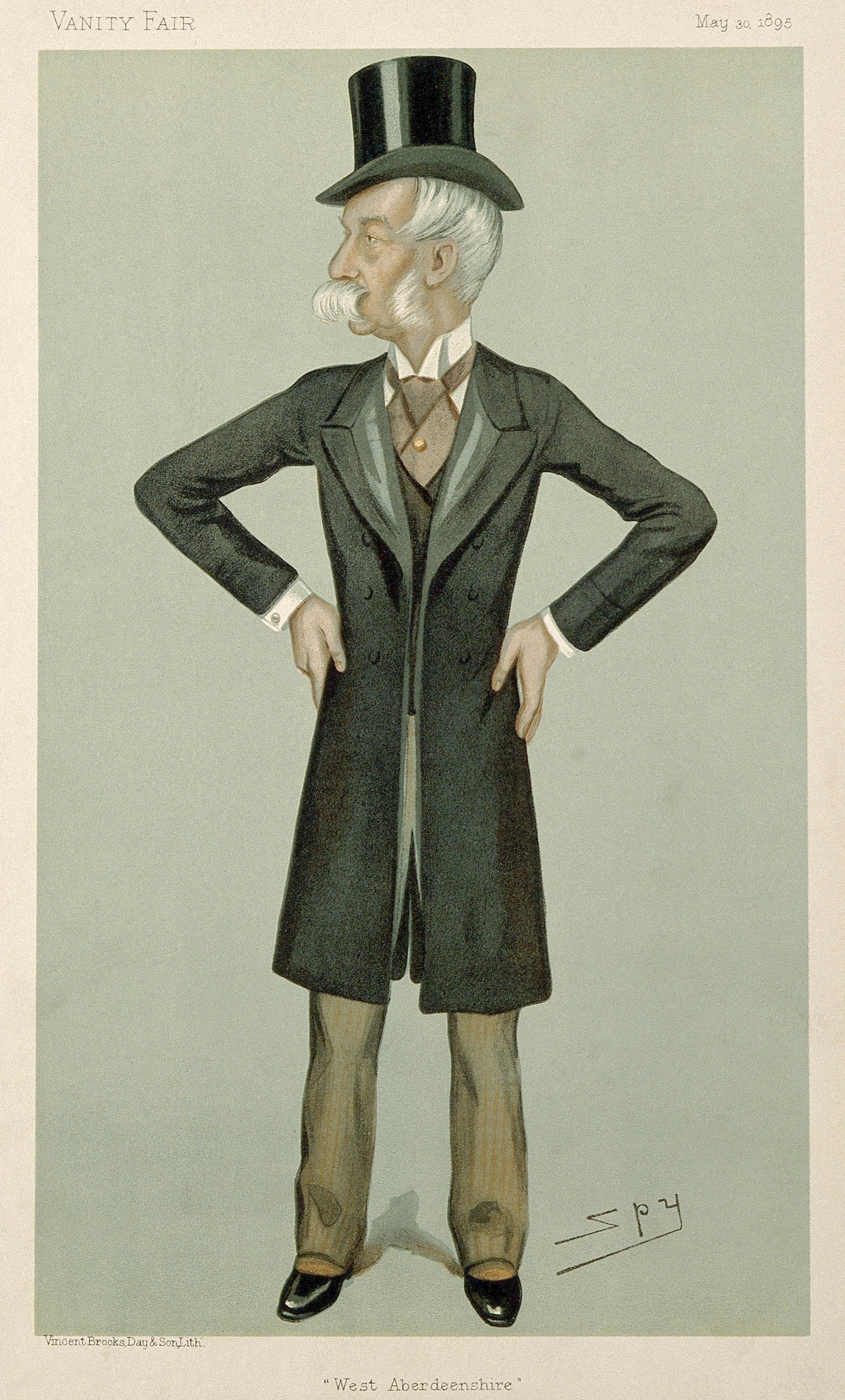
"West Aberdeenshire" Farquharson as caricatured by Spy (Leslie Ward) in Vanity Fair, May 1895

== Personal life ==
Farquharson and his younger brother Joseph Farquharson looked after the estate at Finzean, Aberdeenshire. His brother was an artist and through this connection, he had his portrait painted by the American artist John Singer Sargent. Farquharson was the author of numerous books including his autobiographical My First Election, from In and Out of Parliament (1911) and The House of Commons from Within (1912).

A lifelong bachelor, Farquharson died in June 1918, following a long illness of almost two years. He was buried in the family plot in Birse, alongside his parents.

Parliament of the United Kingdom
Preceded by Lord Douglas Gordon	Member of Parliament for West Aberdeenshire; 1880 – 1906	Succeeded by John McDonald Henderson
