= Aberdeen and Kincardine Central =

Parliamentary constituency in the United Kingdom, 1918–1950

- Former county constituency for the House of Commons
- Subdivision: Aberdeenshire

1918–1950
- Seats: One
- Created from: East Aberdeenshire and West Aberdeenshire
- Replaced by: East Aberdeenshire and West Aberdeenshire

Aberdeen and Kincardine Central, also known as Central Aberdeenshire, was a county constituency of the House of Commons of the Parliament of the United Kingdom from 1918 until 1950. It elected one Member of Parliament (MP) by the first past the post system of election.

== History ==
The constituency was created by the Representation of the People Act 1918 and first used in the 1918 general election. It was abolished in 1950. For most of its existence, this was a Unionist seat.

== Boundaries ==
Aberdeen and Kincardine Central was entirely within the county of Aberdeen and was one of six constituencies covering that county, the county of city of Aberdeen and the county of Kincardine. The rest of the county of Aberdeen was covered by the county constituencies of Aberdeen and Kincardine East, which was also entirely within that county, and Kincardine and West Aberdeenshire, which covered the county of Kincardine minus burghs covered by Montrose Burghs, and part of the county of Aberdeen. The county of city of Aberdeen was covered by the burgh constituencies of Aberdeen North and Aberdeen South, which were both entirely within the county of city area. Aberdeen and Kincardine Central consisted of the burghs of Ellon, Huntly, Inverurie, Kintore and Oldmeldrum, and the districts of Aberdeen, Ellon, Garioch and Huntly.

The same boundaries were used in the 1922 general election, the 1923 general election, the 1924 general election, the 1929 general election, the 1931 general election, the 1935 general election and the 1945 general election.

Prior to the 1918 boundary reforms, the county of Aberdeen had been covered, nominally, by the four constituencies of East Aberdeenshire, West Aberdeenshire, Aberdeen North, and Aberdeen South, and the county of Kincardine had been covered, nominally, by the Kincardineshire constituency. This arrangement dated from 1885, however, and predated both the redefinition of counties as local government areas, under the Local Government (Scotland) Act 1889, and the creation of the county of city of Aberdeen in 1890. 1918 constituency boundaries took account of new local government boundaries.

New constituency boundaries were drawn for the 1950 general election. Aberdeen and Kincardine Central was abolished and its area was divided between the new constituency of North Angus and Mearns and a new West Aberdeenshire. North Angus and Mearns was created to cover the county of Kincardine and part of the county of Angus. The new West Aberdeenshire was entirely within the county of Aberdeen, but boundaries differed from those of the earlier constituency of that name. The county of Aberdeen was then otherwise covered by East Aberdeenshire, and the county of city of Aberdeen was again covered by Aberdeen North and Aberdeen South.

== Members of Parliament ==
Election	Member	Party
1918	Alexander Theodore Gordon	Coalition Conservative
1919 by-election	Murdoch McKenzie Wood	Liberal
1924	Sir Robert Smith	Unionist
1945	Henry Spence	Unionist
1950	constituency abolished	

== Elections ==
=== Elections in the 1910s ===
General election 1918: Aberdeen and Kincardine Central
Party		Candidate	Votes	%	±%
C	Unionist	Alexander Theodore Gordon	6,546	52.6	
	Liberal	John Henderson	5,908	47.4	
Majority			638	5.2	
Turnout			12,454	47.3	
	Unionist win (new seat)				
C indicates candidate endorsed by the coalition government.

1919 Aberdeenshire and Kincardineshire Central by-election
Party		Candidate	Votes	%	±%
	Liberal	Murdoch McKenzie Wood	4,950	37.5	−9.9
C	Unionist	Leybourne Francis Watson Davidson	4,764	36.1	−16.5
	Labour	Joseph Forbes Duncan	3,482	26.4	New
Majority			186	1.4	N/A
Turnout			13,196	50.1	+2.8
	Liberal gain from Unionist		Swing	+3.3	
C indicates candidate endorsed by the coalition government.

=== Elections in the 1920s ===
General election 1922: Aberdeen and Kincardine Central
Party	Candidate	Votes	%	±%
Liberal	Murdoch McKenzie Wood	9,779	60.1	+22.6
Unionist	Robert Smith	6,481	39.9	+3.8
Majority		3,298	20.2	+18.8
Turnout		16,260	56.9	+6.8
Liberal hold		Swing	+9.4	

General election 1923: Aberdeen and Kincardine Central
Party	Candidate	Votes	%	±%
Liberal	Murdoch McKenzie Wood	9,818	53.6	−6.5
Unionist	Robert Smith	8,507	46.4	+6.5
Majority		1,311	7.2	−13.0
Turnout		18,325	64.7	+7.8
Liberal hold		Swing	-6.5	

General election 1924: Aberdeen and Kincardine Central
Party	Candidate	Votes	%	±%
Unionist	Robert Smith	9,130	44.4	−2.0
Liberal	Murdoch McKenzie Wood	7,639	37.2	−16.4
Labour	J. Newman	3,791	18.4	New
Majority		1,491	7.2	N/A
Turnout		20,560	71.7	+7.0
Unionist gain from Liberal		Swing	+7.2	

Frederick Martin

General election 1929: Aberdeen and Kincardine Central
Party	Candidate	Votes	%	±%
Unionist	Robert Smith	10,773	43.6	−0.8
Liberal	Frederick Martin	9,540	38.7	+1.5
Labour	Arthur Fraser Macintosh	4,357	17.7	−0.7
Majority		1,233	4.9	−2.3
Turnout		24,670	63.0	−8.7
Unionist hold		Swing	-1.2	

=== Elections in the 1930s ===
General election 1931: Aberdeen and Kincardine Central
Party	Candidate	Votes	%	±%
Unionist	Robert Smith	16,501	56.4	+12.8
Liberal	Reginald Berkeley	12,758	43.6	+4.9
Majority		3,743	12.8	+7.9
Turnout		29,259	76.8	+14.8
Unionist hold		Swing	+3.9	

General election 1935: Aberdeen and Kincardine Central
Party	Candidate	Votes	%	±%
Unionist	Robert Smith	14,697	55.0	−1.4
Labour	Gordon Stott	6,128	22.9	New
Liberal	Russell Thomas	5,873	22.0	−21.6
Majority		8,569	32.1	+19.3
Turnout		26,698	66.8	−10.0
Unionist hold		Swing	+10.1	

=== Elections in the 1940s ===
General Election 1939–40

Another General Election was required to take place before the end of 1940. The political parties had been making preparations for an election to take place and by the Autumn of 1939, the following candidates had been selected;

- Unionist: Robert Smith
- Liberal: Ivor Davies

General election 1945: Aberdeenshire Central
Party	Candidate	Votes	%	±%
Unionist	Henry Spence	15,702	52.3	−2.7
Labour	D.S. Hay	7,997	26.6	+3.7
Liberal	Ivor Davies	6,348	21.1	−0.9
Majority		7,705	25.7	−6.4
Turnout		30,047	68.6	−2.2
Unionist hold		Swing	-3.2	

== See also ==
- Former United Kingdom Parliament constituencies
