= William McCombie =

William McCombie MP (1805 – 1 February 1880), was a leading Scottish cattle breeder and agriculturist; he was also known as "the grazier king" or the "king of graziers".

== Life ==
Born at Tillyfour Farm near Alford in Aberdeenshire, the home of his father, Charles McCombie, a farming cattle dealer with Highland roots. He was the cousin of William McCombie of Cairnballoch (1809-1870), the founder editor of the radical Aberdeen Free Press. He is said to be descended from Daniel Makomby also known as Makomby-More (big Makomby) who died in July 1714.

After receiving his education at a local school, he attended Marischal College in Aberdeen but despite his father's reservations, he sought to follow him in an agricultural career. Initially, McCombie's employment was within the extensive family farming business, part of which was transporting cattle to the borders of Scotland and into England for fattening. During the 1820s (Note: The Times quotes 1829, however the website of "The Cattle Site" gives 1824) he rented the arable 1,200-acre (4.9 km^{2}) Tillyfour Farm from his father and began the process of building up his own herd of black polled cattle. The herd already on the farm when he leased it were quality animals and influenced by Lord Panmure, McCombie blended two types of polled cattle from the Aberdeen and Angus varieties to form the basis of the black Aberdeen Angus cattle. McCombie referred to the date he founded his herd as 1832, which was the year his cattle gained a first prize in exhibitions. Over five hundred prizes were won by his cattle throughout the UK and at major exhibitions in France. When rinderpest struck northeast cattle herds in 1865, McCombie organised Aberdeenshire farmers to raise a compensation fund that made possible the rigorous slaughter policy that extirpated the disease, thus providing the model for modern disease control measures among farm stock.

In 1867 his book Cattle and Cattlebreeders was published; three further editions were later printed.

He became the first tenant farmer elected to a Scottish constituency in 1868 when he represented the Liberal Party as the western division of Aberdeen Member of Parliament. He was returned with a majority in 1874 but two years later, in 1876, ill health caused him to resign his seat.

He died on 1 February 1880 aged 74 and is memorialised in the churchyard at Kirkton of Tough in Aberdeensahire.

He never married and died a bachelor at Tillyfour on 1 February 1880. The cattle herd was sold at a disposal sale in August 1880.

Parliament of the United Kingdom
New constituency	Member of Parliament for Aberdeenshire Western; 1868 – 1876	Succeeded by Lord Douglas Gordon
