= Lord Douglas Gordon =

Scottish Liberal Party politician

Lord Douglas William Cope Gordon (11 October 1851 – 4 August 1888), was a Scottish Liberal Party politician.

Gordon was the fourth son of Charles Gordon, 10th Marquess of Huntly, and his second wife Maria Antoinetta (née Pegus). Charles Gordon, 11th Marquess of Huntly, was his elder brother. He entered Parliament for West Aberdeenshire in 1876, a seat he held until 1880, and then represented Huntingdonshire from 1880 to 1885.

Gordon died unmarried in August 1888, aged 36.

Parliament of the United Kingdom
Preceded by William McCombie	Member of Parliament for Aberdeenshire West; 1876 – 1880	Succeeded by Robert Farquharson
Preceded by Edward Fellowes; Viscount Mandeville	Member of Parliament for Huntingdonshire; 1880 – 1885; With: William Fellowes	Constituency abolished
