= Alexander Geddes (meteorologist) =

Scottish meteorologist and physicist

Alexander Ebenezer McLean Geddes OBE FRSE (8 February 1885 – 26 December 1970) was a Scottish meteorologist and physicist. He was generally known as Sandy Geddes and nicknamed Siccer Sandy (meaning Sandy).

== Life ==
He was born in Fordyce, Aberdeenshire on 8 February 1885 and educated at Fordyce Academy. He then attended the University of Aberdeen, graduating with an MA in 1906. In 1908 he became an assistant lecturer at the university teaching natural philosophy (Physics). He received a doctorate (DSc) in 1913.

In the First World War he joined the Royal Flying Corps as a meteorologist at the rank of Lieutenant. He was transferred to the Royal Engineers and served in France and Belgium. He rose to the rank of Captain and was three times mentioned in dispatches. He was awarded a military OBE after the war. In 1919 he returned to the University of Aberdeen as a lecturer.

In 1930 he was elected a Fellow of the Royal Society of Edinburgh. His proposers were Archibald Goldie, Sir Ernest Wedderburn, Arthur Crichton Mitchell, and Ralph Allan Sampson.

In 1946 became a Reader. He retired in 1955, and in the same year the university granted him an honorary doctorate (LLD).

He died on 26 December 1970.

== Publications ==
- Meteorology: An Introductory Treatise (1921)
