= Edward Birch Reynardson =

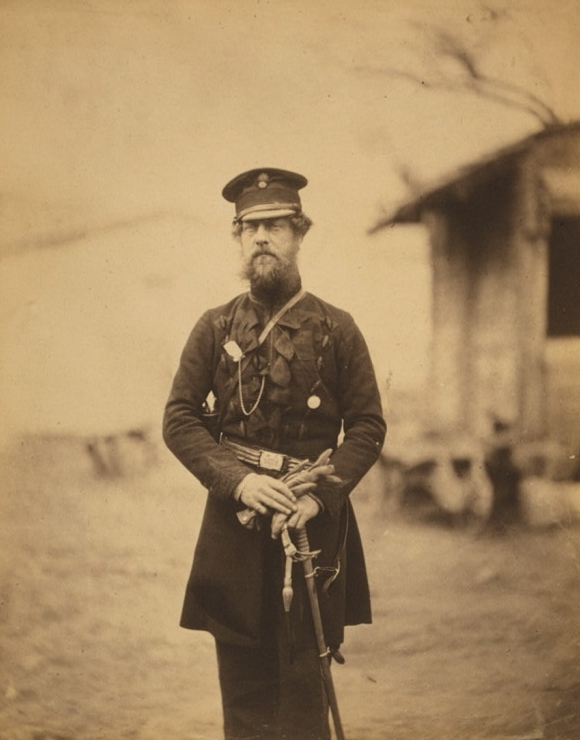
Edward Birch Reynardson

Edward Birch Reynardson (1812–1896) was an officer of the British Army who served during the Crimean War and commanded the Grenadier Guards during the Siege of Sevastopol.
