= George Robert Barker =

Brigadier-General Sir George Robert Barker KCB (9 February 1817 – 27 July 1861) was a British Army officer.

Born in London, he was the youngest son of John Barker, a former deputy-storekeeper general in HM Treasury. Barker was educated at the Royal Military Academy, Woolwich and joined the Royal Artillery in 1834. After the Crimean War in 1855 he was promoted to brevet-colonel. Barker was present at the Siege of Lucknow, commanding the British artillery and then captured the fort of Birwa. He was awarded a Knight of the Order of the Bath in 1859 for his distinguished services during the Indian Mutiny.

In 1852 he married Mary Ann, daughter of Walter George Stewart of Spanish Town, in Jamaica. They had two sons, John Stewart Barker (1853) and Walter George Barker (1857). Barker died in Simla in July 1861.
