= Harry Griffiths (footballer, born 1875) =

English footballer

Personal information
- Full name: Henry Griffiths
- Date of birth: 29 November 1875
- Place of birth: Aston, England
- Date of death: 1950 (aged 74–75)
- Position: Inside forward

Senior career*
Years	Team	Apps	(Gls)
1895–1896	Park Mills		
1896–1897	Lichfield Leomansley		
1897–1898	Redditch Excelsior		
1898–1900	Burton Swifts	69	(23)
1900–1901	Bristol Rovers		
1901–1903	Reading		
1903–1904	Nottingham Forest	8	(1)
1904–1905	Bristol Rovers		
1905	Millwall Athletic		
1905	Kidderminster Harriers		
Total		77	(24)
- * Club domestic league appearances and goals

Henry Griffiths (29 November 1875–1950) was an English footballer who played in the Football League for Burton Swifts and Nottingham Forest.
