= Murdoch McKenzie Wood =

Scottish Liberal politician

Sir Murdoch McKenzie–Wood OBE, DL
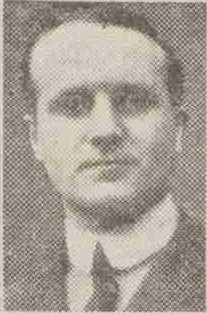
- McKenzie Wood, c. 1923

Member of Parliament for Banffshire
- In office 30 May 1929 – 14 November 1935
- Preceded by: William Templeton
- Succeeded by: Edmund Findlay

Member of Parliament for Aberdeen and Kincardine Central
- In office 30 April 1919 – 29 October 1924
- Preceded by: Alexander Theodore Gordon
- Succeeded by: Robert Smith

Personal details
- Born: Murdoch McKenzie–Wood; 19 July 1881
- Died: 11 October 1949 (aged 68)
- Party: Liberal
- Parents: James Wood (father); Christina McKenzie (mother)
- Education: Fordyce Academy
- Alma mater: University of Edinburgh

Major Sir Murdoch McKenzie Wood OBE, DL (19 July 1881 – 11 October 1949) was a Scottish Liberal politician.

== Early life and career ==
He was the second son of James Wood of Cullen, Banffshire, and Christina McKenzie. He was educated at Fordyce Academy and Edinburgh University.

== Military career ==
He served with the Gordon Highlanders during World War I, being appointed a Second Lieutenant in the 6th (Banff and Donside) Battalion in 1914. By then ranked as a Captain (Acting Major), he was awarded the OBE in the 1919 New Year Honours in recognition of valuable services rendered in connection with the War. In 1924 he married Muriel Davis. He was knighted in 1932 and was a Deputy Lieutenant for Banffshire from 1948.

== Professional career ==
He received a call to the bar by Gray's Inn in 1910. He was on the editorial staff of the Daily Mail. In World War I he served with the Gordon Highlanders and was severely wounded. He later served with the administrative staff of the Royal Air Force.

== Political career ==
He was the unsuccessful Liberal Party parliamentary candidate for the Unionist seat of Ayr Burghs in 1918 where the intervention of a Labour Party candidate prevented what would otherwise have been a rare gain for the Liberals.

He entered Parliament as Liberal MP for Aberdeen and Kincardine Central at a by-election in April 1919. This was a notable gain for the opposition Liberals against a Unionist candidate supported by the Coalition Government.

He served as the Scottish Liberal Whip from 1923 to 1924. At the 1924 general election, a Labour candidate intervened and split the anti-Unionist vote, which cost him his seat.

He switched to contest Banffshire for the 1929 United Kingdom general election. He comfortably re-gained a seat the Liberals had lost in 1924.

In 1931, following the formation of the National Government, he was returned unopposed at the general election as a supporter of the new administration. He was an unpaid Assistant Government Whip from 1931 to 1932. When the Liberal party left the National Government he continued in the role of Scottish Liberal Whip from 1932 to 1934. In 1935 he was defeated at Banffshire and did not stand for parliament again.

=== Elections contested ===
==== UK Parliament elections ====
Date of election	Constituency	Party	Votes	%	Result
1918	Ayr Burghs	Liberal	5,410	27.7	Not Elected (2nd)
1919	Aberdeen and Kincardine Central	Liberal	4,950	37.5	Elected
1922	Aberdeen and Kincardine Central	Liberal	9,779	60.1	Elected
1923	Aberdeen and Kincardine Central	Liberal	9,818	53.6	Elected
1924	Aberdeen and Kincardine Central	Liberal	7,639	37.2	Not Elected (2nd)
1929	Banffshire	Liberal	9,278	44.3	Elected
1931	Banffshire	Liberal	Unopposed		Elected
1935	Banffshire	Liberal	11,168	48.7	Not Elected (2nd)

Parliament of the United Kingdom
Preceded by Alexander Theodore Gordon	Member of Parliament for Aberdeenshire Central; 1919–1924	Succeeded by Robert Smith
Preceded by William Templeton	Member of Parliament for Banffshire; 1929–1935	Succeeded by Edmund Findlay
