= Griffith baronets =

Extinct baronetcy in the Baronetage of the United Kingdom

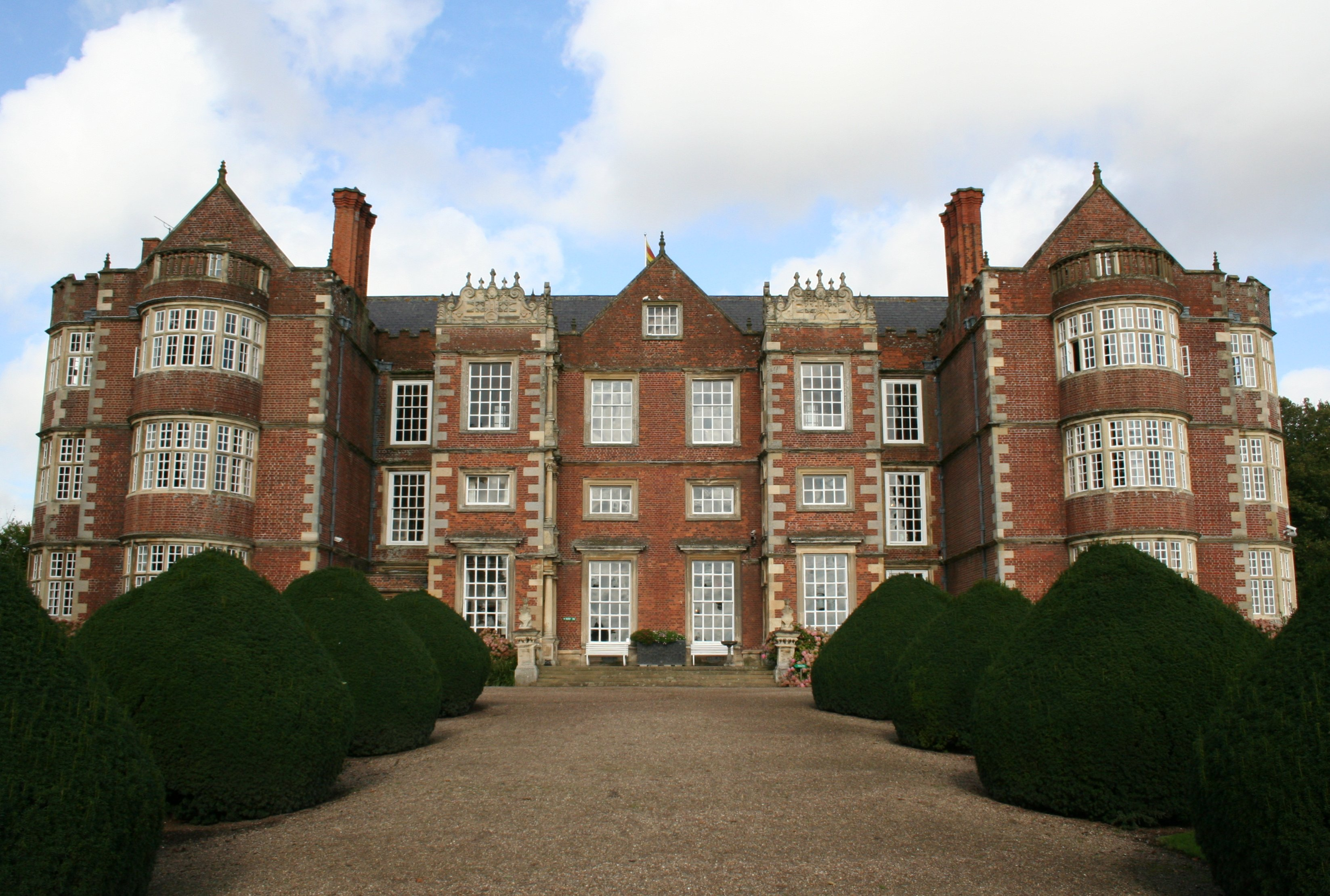
Burton Agnes Hall, the seat of the Griffith baronets of Burton Agnes

There have been two baronetcies created for persons with the surname Griffith, one in the Baronetage of England and one in the Baronetage of the United Kingdom. Both creations are extinct.

The Griffith Baronetcy, of Burton Agnes in the County of York, was created in the Baronetage of England on 7 June 1627 for Henry Griffith. The title became extinct on the death of his son, the second Baronet, in 1656. The family seat was Burton Agnes Hall, Burton Agnes, Yorkshire. Frances Griffith, daughter and sole heiress of the first Baronet, married Sir Matthew Boynton, 1st Baronet, through which marriage the house came into the Boynton family (see Boynton baronets).

The Griffith, later Waldie-Griffith Baronetcy, of Munster Grillagh in the County of Londonderry and of Pencraig in the County of Anglesey, was created in the Baronetage of the United Kingdom on 20 April 1858. For more information on this creation, see Waldie-Griffith baronets.

== Griffith baronets, of Burton Agnes (1627) ==
Sir Henry Griffith, 1st Baronet (1558 – c. 1620)
In 1584 he was Justice of the Peace for Staffordshire, and later High Sheriff of the county. Son of Walter Griffith. Knighted by King James I at York in 1603.
Sir Henry Griffith, 2nd Baronet (died 20 February 1654)
Sheriff of Staffordshire in 1634, and Deputy Lieutenant of Yorkshire in 1638–9. He sided with the King in the first Civil War, surrendered to Fairfax three weeks after the Battle of Marston Moor (1644), took the National Covenant, and was very heavily fined by Parliament. Died in 1654.

Collier (1914) suggests that there was actually only one Griffith baronet, the younger of the above two: "Sir Henry Griffith died in 1620, and was succeeded by the second Sir Henry, the last of the Griffiths. He was created a baronet in 1627…"
