= Harry Griffith =

Harry Griffith may refer to:

- Harry Earl Griffith, newspaper publisher
- Harry Devonald Griffith (1898–1964), British physicist and author
- Harry Griffith, Canadian football coach, see 1st Grey Cup
- Harry Griffith, actor in Catch My Smoke

== See also ==
- Henry Griffith (disambiguation)
- Harold Griffith (1894–1985), Canadian anesthesiologist
- Harold Griffith (Australian cricketer) (1879–1947)
- Harold Griffith (Barbadian cricketer) (1921–2004)
