= Alexander Theodore Gordon =

British politician

Alexander Gordon

Member of Parliament for Aberdeen and Kincardine Central
- In office 14 December 1918 – 6 March 1919
- Preceded by: Constituency established
- Succeeded by: Murdoch McKenzie Wood

Personal details
- Born: 11 May 1881
- Died: 6 March 1919 (aged 37) Newton Insch, Aberdeenshire
- Party: Scottish Unionist Party

Military service
- Allegiance: United Kingdom
- Branch/service: British Army
- Rank: Lieutenant Colonel
- Battles/wars: Second Boer War; First World War

Alexander Theodore Gordon (11 May 1881 – 6 March 1919) was a Scottish Unionist Party politician. He was elected as the Member of Parliament (MP) for Aberdeen and Kincardine Central in the 1918 General Election, but died two months later.

He joined the Gordon Highlanders as second lieutenant on 30 June 1900, and served in the Second Boer War in 1900–01; taking part in the operations in the Transvaal, east of Pretoria, from July to November 1900, and later in the Orange River Colony. He was promoted to lieutenant on 21 February 1902. The war ended in June 1902, and Gordon left Cape Town on the SS Scot in September, returning home. During the First World War he was head of the Forage Department of the War Office in Scotland, with the rank of lieutenant-colonel. He was also an expert breeder of Shorthorn Cattle.

At the 1918 General Election, Gordon won the new constituency of Aberdeen and Kincardine Central by a majority of 638 votes over the Liberal candidate.

He never spoke or voted in Parliament, but shortly before his death he was appointed a member of the House of Commons Scottish Standing Committee.

Gordon died, at Newton Insch, Aberdeenshire aged 37, from heart failure after suffering from influenza, just over two months after his election. He thus became one of the shortest-serving MPs in history. It is likely that Gordon was a victim of the 1918 flu pandemic. At the subsequent by-election Murdoch McKenzie Wood gained the seat for the Liberals.

== See also ==
- List of United Kingdom MPs with the shortest service

Parliament of the United Kingdom
New constituency	Member of Parliament for Aberdeen and Kincardine Central; 1918–1919	Succeeded by Murdoch McKenzie Wood
