= Henry Spence =

Scottish Unionist politician

Henry Reginald Spence OBE (22 June 1897 – 11 September 1981) was a Scottish Unionist politician.

Spence was commissioned in the Royal Flying Corps in 1915; with No. 16 Squadron in 1916-17 and with 12 Wing RAF in 1918 (under Ginger Mitchell). He was later Area Commandant of the Air Training Corps for North-East Scotland.

He was British Cross Country Ski Champion, Mürren in 1929. He worked in textile manufacturing and industry and was managing partner of a firm and director of four others.

Spence was Unionist Member of Parliament for Aberdeen and Kincardine Central from 1945 to 1950 and for West Aberdeenshire from 1950 to 1959.

He died in Kensington and Chelsea, aged 84.

Parliament of the United Kingdom
Preceded by Colin Thornton-Kemsley	Member of Parliament for Aberdeen and Kincardine Central; 1945–1950	Constituency abolished
New constituency	Member of Parliament for West Aberdeenshire; 1950–1959	Succeeded by Forbes Hendry
