= Thomas Leigh-Goldie =

Brigadier-General Thomas Leigh-Goldie
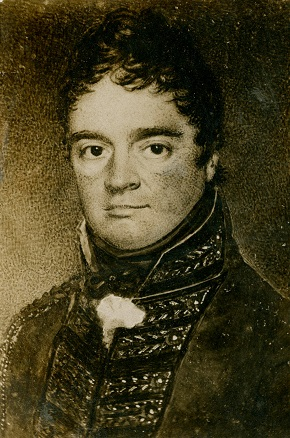
- Brigadier-General Thomas Leigh-Goldie
- Born: 1807
- Died: 5 November 1854 (aged 46–47); Inkerman, Crimea
- Military career
- Allegiance: United Kingdom
- Branch: British Army
- Service years: 1825–1854
- Rank: Brigadier-General
- Commands: 4th Division
- Conflicts: Crimean War

Brigadier-General Thomas Leigh-Goldie (1807 – 5 November 1854) was a senior British Army officer who was killed in action while in command of the 4th Division during the Crimean War.

== Military career ==
Born the son of General Alexander John Goldie and Isabella Taubman, Leigh-Goldie was commissioned as an ensign in the 66th (Berkshire) Regiment of Foot in June 1825. He was deployed to Canada in 1827 and saw action during the rebellions of 1837–1838.

Promoted to lieutenant-colonel, he became commanding officer of the 57th (West Middlesex) Regiment of Foot in around 1840. After landing in the Crimea, and being promoted to brigadier-general, he was given command of the 1st Brigade of the 4th Division at the Battle of Inkerman on 5 November 1854. After Lieutenant-General Sir George Cathcart was killed in action, Leigh-Goldie became acting General Officer Commanding the 4th Division before also being fatally wounded and dying a short time later.

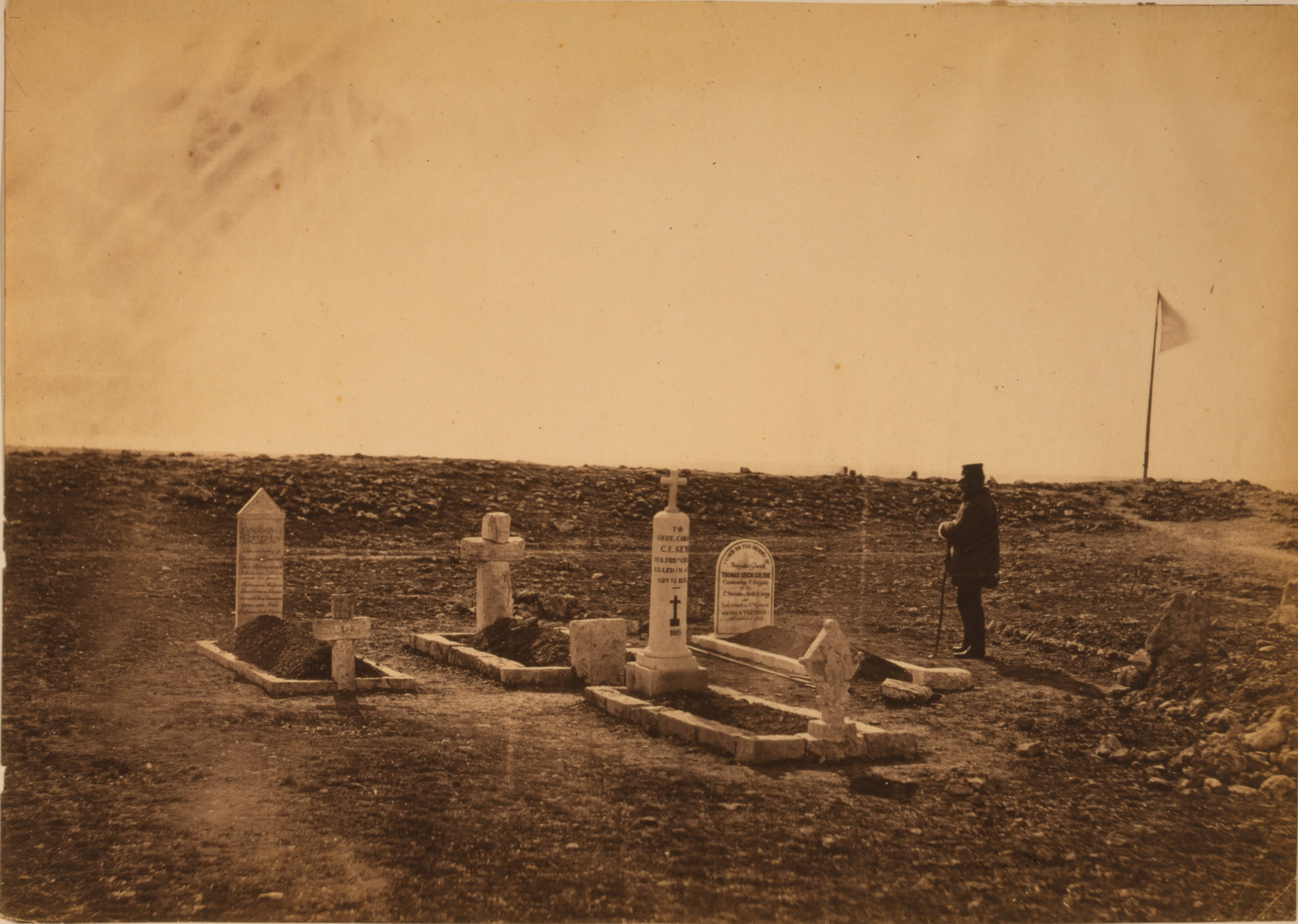
The tombs of the generals on Cathcart's Hill

He was buried in the Crimea and a memorial, consisting of a Russian gun on a stone plinth, was erected at St Mary's Church in Douglas, Isle of Man, near his home in Braddan, Isle of Man.
