= William Robertson (antiquary) =

Scottish antiquary and record keeper (1740–1803)

William Robertson FRSE (1740–1803) was an 18th-century Scottish antiquary who served as Keeper of Records for Scotland.

== Life ==
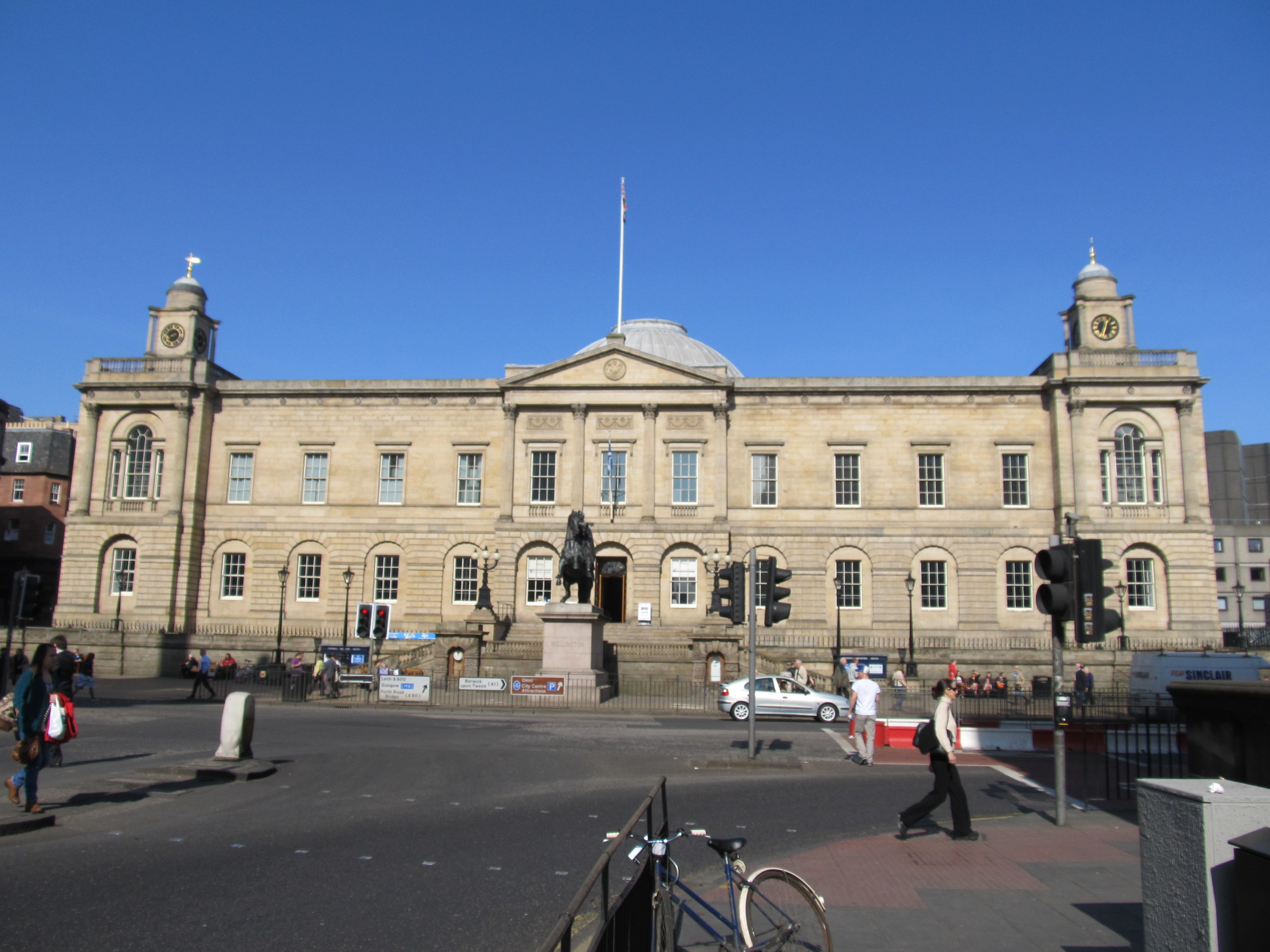
Register House in Edinburgh

He was born in Fordyce in northern Scotland in 1740 the son of James Robertson and his wife, Isabella Taylor. He was educated at Fordyce Grammar School where he befriended George Chalmers. From 1755 to 1757 he studied law at Aberdeen University then was apprenticed to Mr Turner, an advocate in Aberdeen.

In 1758 Turner released him to become personal clerk to Lord Monboddo and assisted him on the infamous "Douglas case". In 1766 Lord Monboddo recommended him as Chamberlain to James Ogilvy, 6th Earl of Findlater. In the autumn of 1773 he met Dr Samuel Johnson at Cullen House during his visit to the earl during his famous tour of Scotland (James Boswell appears to have been absent during this visit).

Late in 1773 he became joint Deputy Keeper of Register House in Edinburgh, alongside his brother, Alexander Robertson (1745-1818) the existing Deputy Keeper since 1773. In 1790 William became Keeper of Records for all Scotland.

In 1799 he was elected a Fellow of the Royal Society of Edinburgh. His proposers were Andrew Dalzell, Lord Woodhouselee, and John Playfair.

Although some sources say that he died in 1799, he died on 4 March 1803 at his house 1 St Andrew Square. He is buried in Greyfriars Kirkyard in the city centre.

His house was demolished in 1890 to build the Prudential Assurance Building. The building is now a public house.

== Family ==
In 1773 he married Margaret Donald, daughter of Cpt Alexander Donald of the Gordon Highlanders.

== Publications ==
- The History of Greece from the Earliest Times (1768)
- A North Briton Extraordinary (1769)
- Proceedings Relating to the Peerage of Scotland 1707 to 1788 (1794)
- The Records of the Parliament of Scotland (1804- published posthumously)
