= Fordyce Castle =

- Fordyce, Aberdeenshire, Scotland
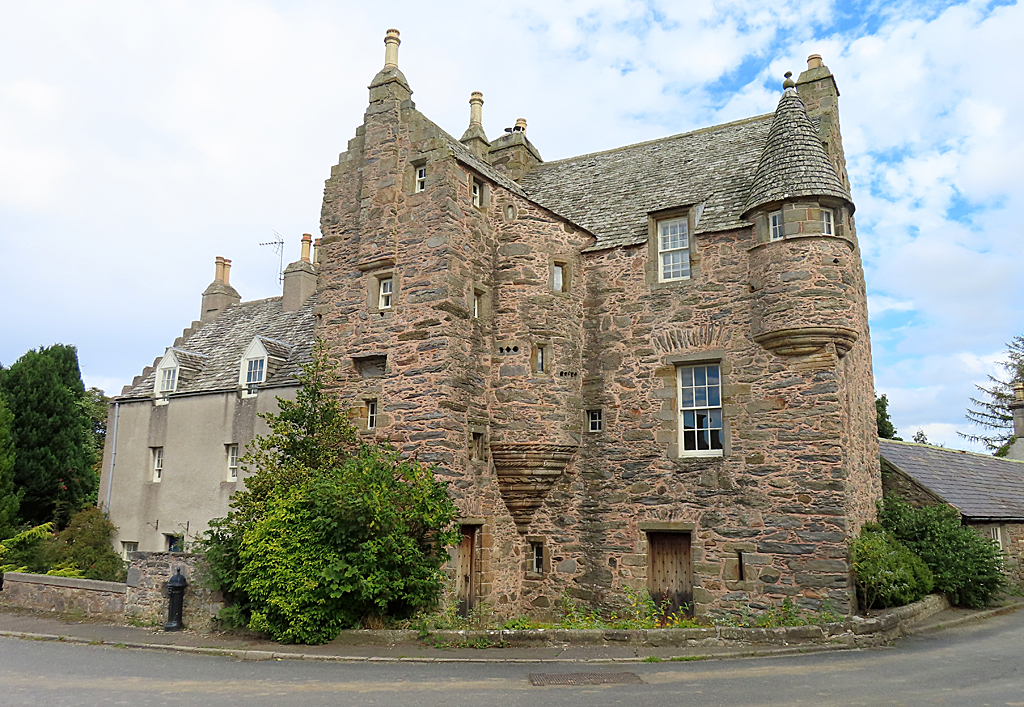
- Fordyce Castle in 2024

Site information
- Type: T-plan

Location
- Coordinates: 57.6609°N 2.7474°W

Site history
- Built: 1592–1700

Fordyce Castle is a T-plan castle, its oldest part dating from 1592, about three miles south-west of Portsoy, in the village of Fordyce, Aberdeenshire, Scotland.

== History ==
The castle was built by Thomas Menzies of Durn and Cults, a former Provost of Aberdeen, as an L-plan tower house. In 1700, it was extended to the present T-plan. The north wing was used as a parish school between 1716 and 1789. After years of neglect, the tower has now been restored. The house has been altered internally.

Thomas Menzies was knighted by James VI and I in 1620. He gave James VI and I a valuable pearl found in the Kellie burn, a tributary of the River Ythan, and the pearl was said to have been set in the crown.

== Structure ==
The main part is an L-plan castle; the 1700 addition was the west wing, at the north gable, which has two storeys and an attic.

The original house has three storeys and a circular stair tower. This tower is corbelled out heavily in the re-entrant angle from the second floor. It is topped with an oversail from the roof of the south wing. There are angle turrets with conical caps on the top storey. Variations of cable moulding in diminishing courses terminating as foliated stop decorate the corbelling.

At the foot of the circular wing, in the re-entrant angle, is the entrance. There is a vaulted basement. The stair in the main wing rises only to the first floor, ascent to the upper levels is by the south wing stair. Another entrance, in the main front, and flanked by slit vents, gives access to the basement.

There are four different types of shot holes, providing a wide range of fire angles. In the front elevation, there is an enlarged first-floor window under relieving arch which lights the first floor hall. A similar window in the south gable has been blocked. There is a second-floor window in the front elevation, while other windows are very small and are randomly sited. The monogram of Thomas Menzies of Durn is carved on the south-west turret.

The 1700 addition has three entrances, the main one being on the first floor, approached by an external forestair.

The roof is of Banffshire slate.

It is a category A listed building.
