= Fordyce, Aberdeenshire =

Village in Aberdeenshire, Scotland

Coordinates: 57°39′42.5″N 2°44′47.5″W

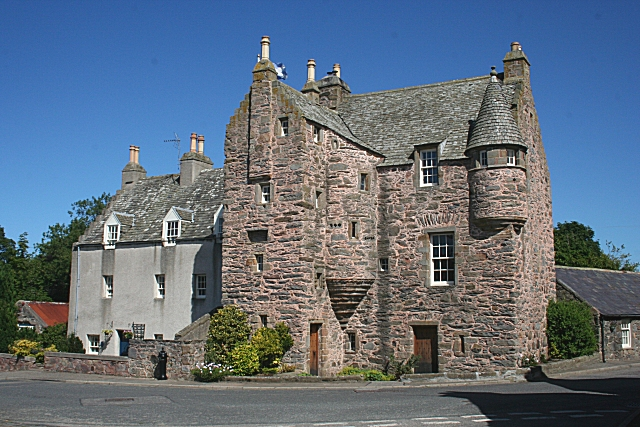
The Scottish baronial style Fordyce Castle

Fordyce /fɔːrˈdaɪs/ is a village in Aberdeenshire, Scotland that is slightly inland from the point where the Burn of Fordyce meets the sea between Cullen and Portsoy. It has existed since at least the 13th century. In 1990, Charles McKean wrote that Fordyce was "a sheer delight to discover, concealed as it is from the passing eye by hills and rolling countryside".

The Kirkton of Fordyce was erected into a Burgh of Barony in 1499 by Bishop William Elphinstone of Aberdeen.

Fordyce Parish Church, a fair distance from the village centre, dates to 1804. Its predecessor, St Talorgan Parish Church, has a belfry dating to 1661.

== Fordyce Castle ==
Fordyce Castle, a T-plan structure built in 1592 and extended in 1700, lies in the centre of the village.

== Fordyce Academy ==
Until 1964, the village had a notable secondary school called Fordyce Academy, which although small achieved high standards. Old boys of the school included the physicist and meteorologist Alexander Geddes, the zoologist William Dawson Henderson, and the 18th-century antiquary William Robertson. The brothers Robert and James Smith, who both played for Scotland in the first football international of 1872, were educated at the school.

== Sources ==
Specific

General

- Fordyce in the Gazetteer for Scotland.
