= Kirkton of Tough =

Village in northeast Scotland

Coordinates: 57.20525°N 2.63890°W

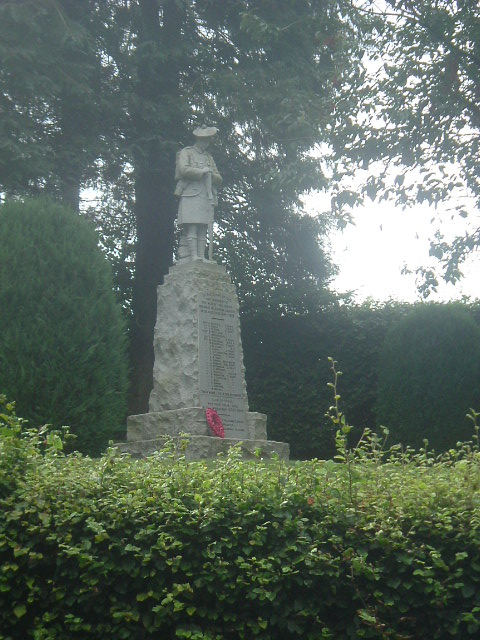

Kirkton of Tough, usually shortened to Tough (/ˈtʊx/ TUUKH), is a settlement in the Marr area of Aberdeenshire, Scotland at grid reference NJ615129. It is about 4 kilometres (2 1/2 miles) southeast of Alford and 143 km (89 mi) from Edinburgh. Tough is where the Aberdeen Angus breed of cattle was first bred.

The church (kirk of Kirkton) was dedicated to the Nine Maidens and dates from at least 1366 but was rebuilt in 1838.

== See also ==
- Aberdeenshire (historic)
