= Brucklay Castle =

16th-century castle in Aberdeenshire, Scotland

Coordinates: 57.5414°N 2.1504°W

Brucklay Castle, also known as Brucklay House, is a 16th-century castle in the Buchan area of Aberdeenshire, Scotland.

The earliest part of the castle was erected by James Crawford of Brucklay in 1600–1625, possibly incorporating elements of a 16th-century building. It was granted by the Clan Irvine to Arthur Dingwall in 1742 when he married into their family. The building was extended in 1765, and again in 1814, by architect John Smith, A major reconstruction took place in 1849, designed by Thomas Mackenzie for Captain Alexander Dingwall-Fordyce. Further additions were made in 1881, probably by architect James Matthews, who was in partnership with Alexander Marshall Mackenzie, son of Thomas.

During World War II, prisoners of war were housed in huts on the castle grounds. In 1952 the building was sold to the housebreaker, Charles Brand of Dundee Ltd. Its contents and some architectural features were sold off shortly afterwards, and the roof removed. By the 1990s it was a ruin and was placed on the Buildings at Risk Register for Scotland. In 2010 planning consent was granted for partial demolition and restoration of the house, though by 2013 this had not been implemented. The house is a category C listed building.

Within the estate is the private burial ground of the Dingwall-Fordyce family, including an obelisk commemorating William Dingwall Fordyce, MP (1836-1875), who is also commemorated by the Culsh Monument at New Deer.
