= 1903 East Perthshire by-election =

UK parliamentary by-election

The 1903 East Perthshire by-election was a parliamentary by-election held for the UK House of Commons constituency of East Perthshire in the County of Perth on 26 February 1903.

== Vacancy ==
The by-election was caused by the resignation of the sitting Liberal MP, Sir John Kinloch.

== Candidates ==
The Liberals selected Thomas Buchanan, a barrister by profession and a former MP for three different Scottish constituencies.

A meeting of Conservatives and Liberal Unionists took place in Perth on 13 February 1903 to decide whether or not to contest the election. It was reported that the candidate they had invited to stand had declined to do so and in the end they could not find a candidate willing to fight this traditional Liberal seat, which had been held by the Liberal Party at every election since its creation in 1885.

== Result ==
There being no other candidates putting themselves forward therefore, Buchanan was returned unopposed. He told his supporters that they had 'gained one of the greatest Liberal victories in Scotland, as complete a victory as the largest majority could have given them at the poll'.

East Perthshire by-election, 1903
Party	Candidate	Votes	%	±%
Liberal	Thomas Buchanan	Unopposed	N/A	N/A
Liberal hold				

== See also ==
- Lists of United Kingdom by-elections
- United Kingdom by-election records
