= Peter Esslemont =

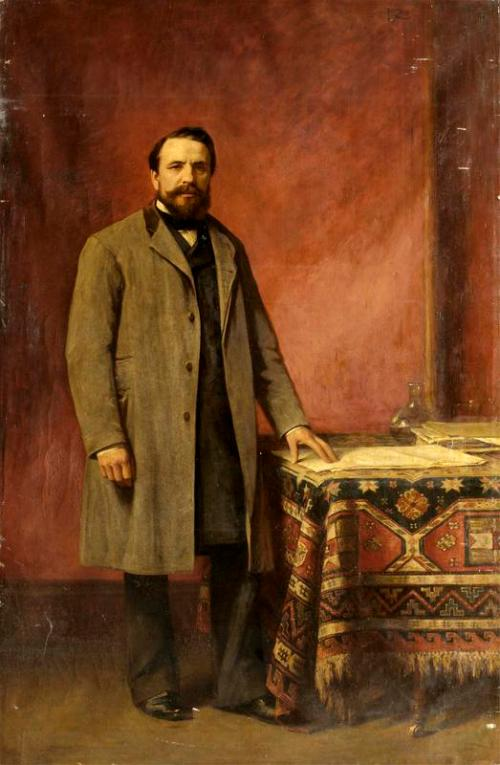
Portrait of Peter Esslemont by Sir George Reid

Peter Esslemont (13 June 1834 – 8 August 1894) was a Scottish Liberal politician who sat in the House of Commons from 1885 to 1892.

== Life ==
Esslemont was born in Balnakettle, Udny, Aberdeenshire the son of Peter Esslemont, a farmer, and his wife Ann Connon. He was educated at Public School, Belhelvie. He became head of Esslemont and Macintosh, warehousemen, of Aberdeen and a director of the Scottish Employers Liability Co. He was President of the Chamber of Commerce, a J.P. for Aberdeenshire and author of Scheme for Improvement of Robert Gordon's Hospital.From 1880 until 1883, he was the Lord Provost of Aberdeen In 1884, he was a guest at Haddo House for a dinner hosted by John Hamilton-Gordon, 1st Marquess of Aberdeen and Temair in honour of William Ewart Gladstone on his tour of Scotland.

Esslemont was first elected as the Liberal Member of Parliament for East Aberdeenshire at the 1885 general election. He remained an MP there until he resigned in late 1892 to take up the post of Chairman of the Fishery Board for Scotland.

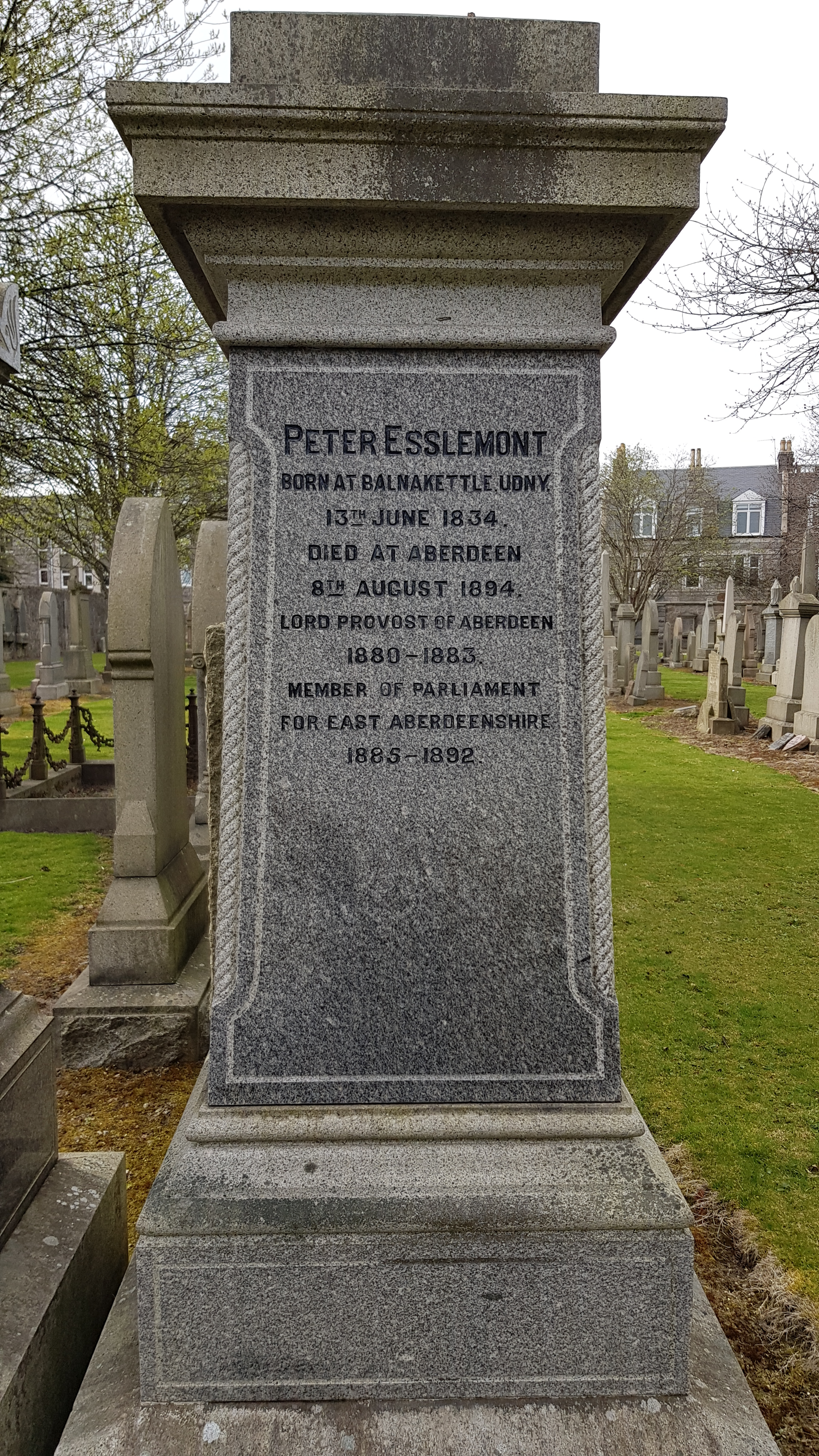
Gravestone of Peter Esslemont

He lived his final years at 34 Albyn Place in Aberdeen.

He died in Aberdeen in 1894 aged 60 and is buried at the Nellfield Cemetery.

== Family ==
Esslemont married Georgia Anna Birnie at Walkmill, New Deer in 1857 and they had six children. Georgia died in 1871 and he married again in 1876 to Mary Anna Sherwood daughter of Rev. William Bradford Sherwood, of United States of America and went on to have a further five children. Peter Esslemont is related to John Esslemont.

Parliament of the United Kingdom
Preceded by Sir Alexander Hamilton-Gordon	Member of Parliament for East Aberdeenshire; 1885–1892	Succeeded by Thomas Buchanan
Civic offices
Preceded by George Jamieson	Lord Provost of Aberdeen; 1880–1883	Succeeded by James Matthews
