= East Aberdeenshire =

Parliamentary constituency in the United Kingdom, 1950–1983

- Former county constituency for the House of Commons
- Subdivisions of Scotland: Aberdeenshire

1950–1983
- Seats: One
- Created from: East Aberdeenshire & Kincardineshire; Central Aberdeenshire & Kincardineshire
- Replaced by: Banff & Buchan; Gordon

1868–1918
- Seats: One
- Type of constituency: County constituency
- Created from: Aberdeenshire; Aberdeen
- Replaced by: East Aberdeenshire & Kincardineshire; Central Aberdeenshire & Kincardineshire

East (or Eastern) Aberdeenshire was a Scottish county constituency of the House of Commons of the Parliament of the United Kingdom from 1868 to 1918 and from 1950 to 1983. It elected one Member of Parliament (MP) by the first past the post system of election.

During the period 1918 to 1950, the area of the constituency was divided between East Aberdeenshire and Kincardineshire and Central Aberdeenshire and Kincardineshire, which were both entirely within the county of Aberdeen.

In 1983, the East Aberdeenshire area was divided between the new constituencies of Banff and Buchan and Gordon.

== Boundaries ==
=== Eastern Aberdeenshire, 1868 to 1918 ===
==== 1868 to 1885 ====
When, created by the Representation of the People (Scotland) Act 1868, and first used in the 1868 general election, the constituency was nominally one of three covering the county of Aberdeen. The other two were the county constituency of West Aberdeenshire and the burgh constituency of Aberdeen. The county had been covered previously by the Aberdeenshire constituency and the Aberdeen constituency.

East Aberdeenshire was defined by the 1868 legislation as consisting of the parishes of Aberdour, Belhelvie, Bourtie, Crimond, Cruden, Daviot, Ellon, Fintray, Foveran, Fraserburgh, Fyvie, Keith-hall and Kinkell, King-Edward, Logie-Buchan, Longside, Lonmay, Methlick, Montquhitter, New Deer, New Machar, Old Deer, Oldmeldrum, Peterhead, Pitsligo, Rathen, Slains, Strichen, Tarves, Turriff, Tyrie and Udny, together with the part of the parish of Old Machar lying east of the River Don, and the parish of St Fergus in Banffshire.

1868 boundaries were also used in the 1874 general election and the 1880 general election.

==== 1885 to 1918 ====
For the 1885 general election the burgh constituencies of Aberdeen North and Aberdeen South were created. Both of these new constituencies included areas beyond the boundaries of the burgh of Aberdeen.

1885 boundaries were also used in the 1886 general election, the 1892 general election, the 1895 general election, the 1900 general election, the 1906 general election, the January 1910 general election and the December 1910 general election.

County boundaries were redefined under the Local Government (Scotland) Act 1889, and the county of city of Aberdeen was created in 1900, but these developments did not affect constituency boundaries.

In 1918, the Representation of the People Act 1918 created new constituency boundaries, taking account of new local government boundaries, and grouped the county of Aberdeen, the county of city of Aberdeen and the county of Kincardine in the creation of new constituencies for the 1918 general election.

=== East Aberdeenshire, 1950 to 1983 ===
==== 1950 to 1955 ====
The House of Commons (Redistribution of Seats) Act 1949 created new boundaries for the 1950 general election, and East Aberdeenshire was created as one of four constituencies covering the county of Aberdeen and the county of city of Aberdeen. East Aberdeenshire and West Aberdeenshire were entirely within the county of Aberdeen, and Aberdeen North and Aberdeen South were entirely within the county of city of Aberdeen. East Aberdeenshire consisted of the burghs of Ellon, Fraserburgh, Huntly, Peterhead, Rosehearty and Turriff and the districts of Deer, Ellon, Huntly and Turriff.

The same boundaries were used for the 1951 general election.

==== 1955 to 1983 ====
For the 1955 general election, the burgh of Huntly and the district of Huntly were transferred to West Aberdeenshire.

East Aberdeenshire retained the same boundaries for the 1959 general election, the 1964 general election, the 1966 general election, the 1970 general election, the February 1974 general election and the October 1974 general election.

In 1975, throughout Scotland, under the Local Government (Scotland) Act 1973, counties and burghs were abolished as local government areas, and East Aberdeenshire became a constituency within the Grampian region.

The 1979 general election was held before a review of constituency boundaries took account of new local government boundaries.

For the 1983 general election, the East Aberdeenshire area was divided between the new constituencies of Banff and Buchan and Gordon.

== Members of Parliament ==
=== Eastern Aberdeenshire, 1868 to 1918 ===
Election	Member	Party
1868	William Dingwall Fordyce	Liberal
1875 by-election	Sir Alexander Hamilton-Gordon	Conservative
1879	Sir Alexander Hamilton-Gordon	Liberal
1885	Peter Esslemont	Liberal
1892 by-election	Thomas Buchanan	Liberal
1900	Archibald White Maconochie	Liberal Unionist
1906	James Annand	Liberal
1906 by-election	James Murray	Liberal
Jan. 1910	Henry Cowan	Liberal
1916	Henry Cowan	Coalition Liberal
1918	constituency abolished	

=== East Aberdeenshire, 1950 to 1983 ===
Election	Member	Party
1950	Sir Robert Boothby	Conservative
1958 by-election	Patrick Wolrige-Gordon	Conservative
Feb 1974	Douglas Henderson	SNP
1979	Albert McQuarrie	Conservative
1983	constituency abolished	

== Election results ==
=== Elections in the 1860s ===
1868 general election: Aberdeenshire Eastern
Party	Candidate	Votes	%	±%
Liberal	William Dingwall Fordyce	Unopposed		
Registered electors		4,297		
Liberal win (new seat)				

=== Elections in the 1870s ===
1874 general election: Aberdeenshire Eastern
Party	Candidate	Votes	%	±%
Liberal	William Dingwall Fordyce	Unopposed		
Registered electors		4,371		
Liberal hold				

Fordyce's death caused a by-election.

By-election 1875: Aberdeenshire Eastern
Party	Candidate	Votes	%	±%
Conservative	Alexander Hamilton-Gordon	1,903	55.0	New
Liberal	George Hope	1,558	45.0	N/A
Majority		345	10.0	N/A
Turnout		3,461	76.9	N/A
Registered electors		4,499		
Conservative gain from Liberal				

=== Elections in the 1880s ===
1880 general election: Aberdeenshire Eastern
Party	Candidate	Votes	%	±%
Liberal	Alexander Hamilton-Gordon	Unopposed		
Registered electors		4,788		
Liberal hold				

1885 general election: Aberdeenshire Eastern
Party	Candidate	Votes	%	±%
Liberal	Peter Esslemont	6,509	67.4	N/A
Conservative	Henry Wolrige-Gordon	3,155	32.6	New
Majority		3,354	34.8	N/A
Turnout		9,664	77.2	N/A
Registered electors		12,522		
Liberal hold		Swing	N/A	

1886 general election: Aberdeenshire Eastern
Party	Candidate	Votes	%	±%
Liberal	Peter Esslemont	4,952	66.1	−1.3
Conservative	William Harry Lumsden	2,544	33.9	+1.3
Majority		2,408	32.2	−2.6
Turnout		7,496	59.9	−17.3
Registered electors		12,522		
Liberal hold		Swing	-1.3	

=== Elections in the 1890s ===
1892 general election: Aberdeenshire Eastern
Party	Candidate	Votes	%	±%
Liberal	Peter Esslemont	5,116	59.4	−6.7
Conservative	Francis Russell	3,492	40.6	+6.7
Majority		1,624	18.8	−13.4
Turnout		8,608	72.9	+13.0
Registered electors		11,803		
Liberal hold		Swing	−6.7	

By-election 1892: Aberdeenshire Eastern
Party	Candidate	Votes	%	±%
Liberal	Thomas Buchanan	4,243	59.3	−0.1
Conservative	Francis Russell	2,917	40.7	+0.1
Majority		1,326	18.6	−0.2
Turnout		7,160	60.7	−12.2
Registered electors		11,803		
Liberal hold		Swing	−0.1	

T.R. Buchanan

1895 general election: Aberdeenshire Eastern
Party	Candidate	Votes	%	±%
Liberal	Thomas Buchanan	4,723	58.8	−0.6
Liberal Unionist	William Smith	3,308	41.2	+0.6
Majority		1,415	17.6	−1.2
Turnout		8,031	66.1	−6.8
Registered electors		12,157		
Liberal hold		Swing	−0.6	

=== Elections in the 1900s ===
1900 general election: Aberdeenshire Eastern
Party	Candidate	Votes	%	±%
Liberal Unionist	Archibald White Maconochie	4,173	50.4	+9.2
Liberal	Thomas Buchanan	4,100	49.6	−9.2
Majority		73	0.8	N/A
Turnout		8,273	66.7	+0.6
Registered electors		12,404		
Liberal Unionist gain from Liberal		Swing	+9.2	

James Annand

1906 general election: Aberdeenshire Eastern
Party	Candidate	Votes	%	±%
Liberal	James Annand	6,149	58.7	+9.1
Liberal Unionist	Archibald White Maconochie	4,319	41.3	−9.1
Majority		1,830	17.4	N/A
Turnout		10,468	83.7	+17.0
Registered electors		12,509		
Liberal gain from Liberal Unionist		Swing	+9.1	

By-election 1906: Aberdeenshire Eastern
Party	Candidate	Votes	%	±%
Liberal	James Murray	Unopposed		
Liberal hold				

=== Elections in the 1910s ===
January 1910 general election: Aberdeenshire Eastern
Party	Candidate	Votes	%	±%
Liberal	Henry Cowan	6,600	62.5	+3.8
Liberal Unionist	Charles Burn	3,962	37.5	−3.8
Majority		2,638	25.0	+7.6
Turnout		10,562	83.6	−0.1
Registered electors		12,635		
Liberal hold		Swing	+3.8	

Sir Henry Cowan

December 1910 general election: Aberdeenshire Eastern
Party	Candidate	Votes	%	±%
Liberal	Henry Cowan	6,152	62.0	−0.5
Unionist	William Craighead	3,772	38.0	+0.5
Majority		2,380	24.0	−1.0
Turnout		9,924	78.5	−5.1
Registered electors		12,649		
Liberal hold		Swing	−0.5	

General Election 1914–15:

Another General Election was required to take place before the end of 1915. The political parties had been making preparations for an election to take place and by July 1914, the following candidates had been selected;

- Liberal: Henry Cowan
- Unionist: Malcolm Barclay-Harvey

=== Elections in the 1950s ===
1950 general election: East Aberdeenshire
Party	Candidate	Votes	%	±%
Unionist	Robert Boothby	24,971	65.96	
Labour	Gregor Mackenzie	12,886	34.04	
Majority		12,085	31.92	
Turnout		37,857	75.59	
Unionist hold		Swing		

1951 general election: East Aberdeenshire
Party	Candidate	Votes	%	±%
Unionist	Robert Boothby	24,985	68.05	
Labour	Alexander G.S. Whipp	11,730	31.95	
Majority		13,255	36.10	
Turnout		36,715	69.97	
Unionist hold		Swing		

1955 general election: East Aberdeenshire
Party	Candidate	Votes	%	±%
Unionist	Robert Boothby	18,600	68.5	+0.5
Labour	Charles Ross	8,543	31.5	−0.4
Majority		10,057	37.0	+0.9
Turnout		27,143	59.76	−10.21
Unionist hold		Swing		

By-election 1958: East Aberdeenshire
Party	Candidate	Votes	%	±%
Unionist	Patrick Wolrige-Gordon	14,314	48.5	−20.0
Labour	John B Urquhart	7,986	27.1	−4.4
Liberal	Maitland Mackie	7,153	24.3	New
Majority		6,328	21.4	−15.7
Turnout		29,485		
Unionist hold		Swing		

1959 general election: East Aberdeenshire
Party	Candidate	Votes	%	±%
Unionist	Patrick Wolrige-Gordon	18,982	63.4	−5.1
Labour	John B Urquhart	10,980	36.6	+5.1
Majority		8,002	26.8	−10.2
Turnout		29,962	67.13	+7.37
Unionist hold		Swing		

=== Elections in the 1960s ===
1964 general election: East Aberdeenshire
Party	Candidate	Votes	%	±%
Unionist	Patrick Wolrige-Gordon	14,621	48.0	−15.4
Liberal	Norman W King	7,088	23.3	New
Labour	David McGibbon	6,840	22.5	−14.1
SNP	Bruce Mavor Cockie	1,925	6.3	New
Majority		7,533	24.7	−2.1
Turnout		30,474		
Unionist hold		Swing		

1966 general election: East Aberdeenshire
Party	Candidate	Votes	%	±%
Conservative	Patrick Wolrige-Gordon	12,067	41.5	−6.5
Liberal	Robin Sinclair	8,034	27.6	+4.3
Labour	Ian Stuart Davidson	6,422	22.1	−0.4
SNP	Bruce Mavor Cockie	2,584	8.9	+2.6
Majority		4,033	13.9	−10.8
Turnout		29,107	68.2	
Conservative hold		Swing	−5.5	

=== Elections in the 1970s ===
1970 general election: East Aberdeenshire
Party	Candidate	Votes	%	±%
Conservative	Patrick Wolrige-Gordon	12,866	40.9	−0.6
SNP	Alex Farquhar	9,377	29.8	+20.9
Labour	Harold C. Grimes	5,656	17.9	−4.2
Liberal	Gurth Hoyer-Millar	3,548	11.3	−16.3
Majority		3,489	11.1	−2.8
Turnout		31,447	68.0	−0.2
Conservative hold		Swing	+2.0	

February 1974 general election: Aberdeenshire East
Party	Candidate	Votes	%	±%
SNP	Douglas Henderson	18,333	50.8	+21.0
Conservative	Patrick Wolrige-Gordon	12,634	35.0	−5.9
Liberal	W. Cruikshank	2,727	7.6	−3.7
Labour	Sarah Beverley Sissons	2,416	6.7	−11.2
Majority		5,699	15.8	N/A
Turnout		36,110	76.6	+8.6
SNP gain from Conservative		Swing		

October 1974 general election: Aberdeenshire East
Party	Candidate	Votes	%	±%
SNP	Douglas Henderson	16,304	48.5	−2.3
Conservative	Keith Raffan	11,933	35.5	+0.5
Labour	Sarah Beverley Sissons	3,173	9.4	+2.7
Liberal	C. Alistair Dow	2,232	6.6	−1.0
Majority		4,371	13.0	−2.8
Turnout		33,642	70.5	−6.1
SNP hold		Swing	−1.4	

1979 general election: Aberdeenshire East
Party	Candidate	Votes	%	±%
Conservative	Albert McQuarrie	16,827	42.8	+7.3
SNP	Douglas Henderson	16,269	41.4	−7.1
Labour	N.L. Bonney	6,201	15.8	+6.4
Majority		558	1.4	N/A
Turnout		39,297	72.4	+1.9
Conservative gain from SNP		Swing	+7.2	

== See also ==
- Former United Kingdom Parliament constituencies
