= 1906 East Aberdeenshire by-election =

UK parliamentary by-election

The 1906 East Aberdeenshire by-election was a parliamentary by-election held for the UK House of Commons constituency of East Aberdeenshire in the County of Aberdeen in Scotland on 28 February 1906.

== Vacancy ==
The by-election was caused by the death of the sitting Liberal MP, James Annand on 6 February 1906. Annand had been an MP for only a few days and died before he had an opportunity to take his seat, so becoming one of the shortest-serving MPs in history.

== Candidates ==
The Liberals chose James Murray of Aberdeen, a 55-year-old art collector who was Chairman of the Aberdeen Art Gallery, as their candidate. The Unionists met on 24 February and decided not to stand a candidate. Annand's opponent at the 1906 general election, the Liberal Unionist, Archibald White Maconochie, who had been the local MP from 1900 till 1906, declined to stand again and the Unionists felt it was inadvisable to bring a stranger into the constituency at short notice after their recent defeat.

== Result ==
There being no other candidates putting themselves forward Murray was returned unopposed. He held his seat until the January 1910 United Kingdom general election when he stood down from Parliament.

East Aberdeenshire by-election, 1906
Party	Candidate	Votes	%	±%
Liberal	James Murray	Unopposed	N/A	N/A
Liberal hold				

== See also ==
- Lists of United Kingdom by-elections
- United Kingdom by-election records
