= Henry Cowan =

British politician

Sir Henry Cowan

Member of Parliament for Islington North
- In office 6 December 1923 – 10 May 1929
- Preceded by: Newton Moore
- Succeeded by: Robert Young

Member of Parliament for Aberdeen and Kincardine East East Aberdeenshire (1910–1918)
- In office 15 January 1910 – 26 October 1922
- Preceded by: James Murray
- Succeeded by: Frederick Martin

Member of Parliament for Guildford
- In office 12 January 1906 – 15 January 1910
- Preceded by: St John Broderick
- Succeeded by: Edgar Horne

Personal details
- Born: William Henry Cowan; 22 May 1862
- Died: 11 January 1932 (aged 69)
- Party: Conservative (1923–)
- Other political affiliations: Liberal (Before 1916); Coalition Liberal (1916–1922); National Liberal (1922–1923)
- Parents: William Cowan (father); Elizabeth Giles (mother)
- Education: Merchiston Castle School; Edinburgh Collegiate School
- Alma mater: University of Edinburgh

Sir William Henry Cowan (22 May 1862 – 11 January 1932) was a politician in the United Kingdom.

== Early life and career ==
The son of William Cowan and Elizabeth Giles, he was educated at Merchiston Castle School, Edinburgh Collegiate School and the University of Edinburgh.

== Political career ==
He was elected as Liberal Member of Parliament (MP) for Guildford from 1906 to 1910 and for Aberdeenshire Eastern from 1910 to 1922, then as a Unionist for Islington North from 1923 to 1929.

As a parliamentarian, Cowan became interested in matters concerning immigration including promoting immigration of British families to dominions such as Australia.

=== Elections contested ===
==== UK Parliament elections ====
Date of election	Constituency	Party	Votes	%	Result
1906	Guildford	Liberal	6,430	53.3	Elected
1910 (Jan)	East Aberdeenshire	Liberal	6,600	62.5	Elected
1910 (Dec)	East Aberdeenshire	Liberal	6,152	62.0	Elected
1918	Aberdeen and Kincardine East	Coalition Liberal	4,430	50.5	Elected
1922	Aberdeen and Kincardine East	National Liberal	5,227	39.5	Not elected (2nd)
1923	Islington North	Conservative	10,802	36.5	Elected
1924	Islington North	Conservative	15,562	44.4	Elected

== Personal life ==
As of 1928, he was chairman of Parkinson and W. and B. Cowan, Limited, a manufacturer of gas meters and gas cookers.

He was knighted in the 1917 Birthday Honours.

Parliament of the United Kingdom
Preceded by St John Brodrick	Member of Parliament for Guildford; 1906 – January 1910	Succeeded by Edgar Horne
Preceded by James Murray	Member of Parliament for East Aberdeenshire; January 1910–1918	Constituency abolished
New constituency	Member of Parliament for Aberdeen and Kincardine East; 1918–1922	Succeeded by Frederick Martin
Preceded by Newton Moore	Member of Parliament for Islington North; 1923–1929	Succeeded by Robert Young
