= Frederick Martin (politician) =

Scottish politician and journalist

Frederick Martin in 1922

Frederick Martin CBE (23 October 1882 – 18 January 1950) was a Scottish Liberal, later Labour politician and journalist.

== Family and education ==
Martin was born in Peterhead in Aberdeenshire, the third son of William Martin and Agnes Clark. He was educated at Peterhead Academy. He married Flora Rennie and they had two daughters.

== Early career ==
Martin became a journalist, working on the Aberdeen Free Press and Morning Post. In 1914 he joined the 5th Battalion, the Gordon Highlanders and was commissioned as a Second Lieutenant. He served until 1915 but became blind during his period of training and was hospitalised in St Dunstans Hostel for Blinded Soldiers and Sailors.

== Liberal politics ==
Martin was elected Liberal Member of Parliament for East Aberdeenshire at the 1922 general election.

General election 1922: Aberdeen and Kincardine East Electorate 29,079
Party	Candidate	Votes	%	±%
Liberal	Frederick Martin	8,018	60.5	
National Liberal	Sir William Henry Cowan	5,227	39.5	
Majority			21.0	
Turnout			45.5	
Liberal gain from National Liberal		Swing		

It was rare for anyone with a disability to get elected to Parliament but his blindness during war service brought him a great deal of personal sympathy. He held the seat at the 1923 general election

General election 1923: Aberdeen and Kincardine East Electorate 27,318
Party	Candidate	Votes	%	±%
Liberal	Frederick Martin	8,793	55.9	−4.6
Unionist	Falconer Lewis Wallace	6,949	44.1	+4.6
Majority		1,844	11.8	
Turnout		15,742	57.6	−9.2
Liberal hold		Swing	-4.6	

but was defeated in 1924 when he faced a three-cornered contest.

General election 1924: Aberdeen and Kincardine East Electorate 27,026
Party	Candidate	Votes	%	±%
Unionist	Robert John Graham Boothby	7,363	46.2	+2.1
Liberal	Frederick Martin	4,680	29.4	−26.5
Labour	William Sloan Cormack	3,899	24.4	n/a
Majority		2,683	16.8	28.6
Turnout		15,942	59.0	+1.4
Unionist gain from Liberal		Swing	+14.3	

He tried unsuccessfully to re-enter Parliament as Liberal candidate for Central Aberdeenshire at the 1929 general election.

General election 1929 Electorate 39,182
Party	Candidate	Votes	%	±%
Unionist	Robert Workman Smith	10,773	43.6	−0.8
Liberal	Frederick Martin	9,540	38.7	+1.5
Labour	A.F. Macintosh	4,357	17.7	−0.7
Majority		1,233	4.9	−2.3
Turnout			63.0	
Unionist hold		Swing	-1.2	

== Labour ==
After the 1929 general election, Martin defected from the Liberals to Labour, succumbing to a feeling that this was the end of the line for the old Liberal party. Despite the party having fought a spirited and radical campaign under the leadership of David Lloyd George it had failed to break back into power. According to one historian, Martin was one of a number of MPs, former MPs and candidates who could no longer imagine the circumstances in which the party could ever succeed again. He stood for Parliament, now in the Labour interest, contesting East Aberdeenshire at the general elections of 1931

General election 1931: Aberdeen and Kincardine East Electorate 34,527
Party	Candidate	Votes	%	±%
Unionist	Robert John Graham Boothby	16,396	72.2	
Labour	Frederick Martin	6,299	27.8	
Majority		10,097	44.4	
Turnout		22,695	80.5	
Unionist hold		Swing		

and 1935.

General election 1935: Aberdeen and Kincardine East Electorate 35,839
Party	Candidate	Votes	%	±%
Unionist	Robert John Graham Boothby	12,748	57.0	
Labour	Frederick Martin	9,627	43.0	
Majority		3,121	14.0	
Turnout		22,375	62.4	
Unionist hold		Swing		

He remained as Labour Prospective Parliamentary Candidate for a general election expected to take place in 1939 or 1940. However, by the time the next election came in 1945, he had been replaced as candidate.

== Literary career ==
Martin wrote at least three plays later in life, including "The Moon on Horseback", which he described as "a play of fisher-life", completed in 1934. It is not known if any were ever produced on the stage.

== Local government ==
However Martin did achieve political success at local government level. He served as vice-chairman of Aberdeenshire Education Authority from 1925 to 1930. In 1929 he was elected a member of Aberdeenshire County Council and was Chairman of the Public Health Committee from 1932 to 1945 and Chairman of the Education Committee, 1946–47. He was Vice-Convener (equivalent to vice-chairman) of the County between 1946 and 1949, when he became Convener. He died in office.

== Honours ==
Martin was awarded the CBE in 1942 and was appointed Deputy Lieutenant of Aberdeenshire in 1949.

== Death ==
Martin died at his home in Mintlaw in Aberdeenshire on 18 January 1950, aged 67.

Parliament of the United Kingdom
Preceded by Sir William Henry Cowan	Member of Parliament for Aberdeen and Kincardine East; 1922–1924	Succeeded by Robert Boothby
