= East Perthshire (UK Parliament constituency) =

Parliamentary constituency in the United Kingdom, 1885–1918

Eastern Perthshire
- Former county constituency for the House of Commons
- Subdivisions of Scotland: Perthshire

1885–1918
- Seats: One
- Created from: Perthshire
- Replaced by: Perth

East (or Eastern) Perthshire was a county constituency of the House of Commons of the Parliament of the United Kingdom from 1885 to 1918. It elected one Member of Parliament (MP) by the first past the post voting system.

== Boundaries ==
The constituency was defined by the Redistribution of Seats Act 1885, by dividing the Perthshire constituency to form two new constituencies which were first used in the 1885 general election. The other new constituency was West Perthshire. Together with the burgh constituency of Perth, which was unaltered, these constituencies covered the county of Perth, except that five detached parishes had been merged into the Clackmannanshire and Kinross-shire constituency by the Representation of the People (Scotland) Act 1832.

As defined in the 1885 Act, the constituency consisted of the "Parishes of Aberdalgie, Alyth, Abernyte, Auchtergaven, Arngask, Abernethy, Blairgowrie, Bendochy, Coupar Angus, Cargill, Caputh (except the detached portions locally situated in Forfarshire), Collace, Clunie, Dunbarney, Dunning, the detached portion of the parish of Dunkeld and Dowally which contains the town of Dunkeld, Dron, Errol, Fowlis-Easter, Forteviot, Forgandenny, Findogask, Inchture, so much of the parish of Kettins as is locally situate in Perthshire, Kinloch, Kinfauns, Kinclaven, Kinnaird, Kinnoull, Kilspindie, Lethendy, Longforgan (including so much of the parish of ‘Liff, Benvie, and Invergowrie’ as is situate in Perthshire), Meigle, Methven, Moneydie, Perth, Redgorton, Tibbermore, Rattray, Rhynd, Scone, St. Martins, and St Madoes."

1885 boundaries were used also in the general elections of 1886, 1892, 1895, 1900, 1906, January 1910 and December 1910.

By 1918, throughout most of Scotland, county boundaries had been altered, and detached parishes were generally historic. The Representation of the People Act 1918 took account of new local government boundaries and grouped the county of Perth with the county of Kinross for parliamentary representation purposes. Therefore, for the 1918 general election, the two counties were covered by the Perth constituency, which was now a county constituency, entirely within the county of Perth, and the Kinross and West Perthshire constituency, which covered the county of Kinross and part of the county of Perth.

== Members of Parliament ==
| Election | Member | Party |
|---|---|---|
| 1885 | Robert Stewart Menzies | Liberal |
| 1889 b-e | Sir John Kinloch | Liberal |
| 1903 b-e | Thomas Buchanan | Liberal |
| Jan. 1910 | William Young | Liberal |
| 1918 | constituency abolished | |

== Elections ==
| Decades: | 1880s; 1890s; 1900s; 1910s |

=== Elections in the 1880s ===
1885 general election: East Perthshire
| Party | Candidate | Votes | % | ±% |
|---|---|---|---|---|
| Liberal | Robert Stewart Menzies | 4,222 | 63.6 | |
| Conservative | Andrew Murray | 2,421 | 36.4 | |
| Majority | | 1,801 | 27.2 | |
| Turnout | | 6,643 | 84.6 | |
| Registered electors | | 7,851 | | |
| Liberal win (new seat) | | | | |

1886 general election: East Perthshire
| Party | Candidate | Votes | % | ±% |
|---|---|---|---|---|
| Liberal | Robert Stewart Menzies | 3,504 | 61.5 | −2.1 |
| Liberal Unionist | John Robert Holland | 2,195 | 38.5 | +2.1 |
| Majority | | 1,309 | 23.0 | −4.2 |
| Turnout | | 5,699 | 72.6 | −12.0 |
| Registered electors | | 7,851 | | |
| Liberal hold | | Swing | -2.1 | |

Menzies' death caused a by-election.

Kinloch

1889 East Perthshire by-election
| Party | Candidate | Votes | % | ±% |
|---|---|---|---|---|
| Liberal | John Kinloch | 4,005 | 63.6 | +2.1 |
| Conservative | William Lindsay Boase | 2,289 | 36.4 | −2.1 |
| Majority | | 1,716 | 27.2 | +4.2 |
| Turnout | | 6,294 | 80.8 | +8.2 |
| Registered electors | | 7,790 | | |
| Liberal hold | | Swing | +2.1 | |

=== Elections in the 1890s ===
1892 general election: East Perthshire
| Party | Candidate | Votes | % | ±% |
|---|---|---|---|---|
| Liberal | John Kinloch | 3,533 | 58.7 | −2.8 |
| Conservative | William Lindsay Boase | 2,484 | 41.3 | +2.8 |
| Majority | | 1,049 | 17.4 | −5.6 |
| Turnout | | 6,017 | 79.3 | +6.7 |
| Registered electors | | 7,585 | | |
| Liberal hold | | Swing | −2.8 | |

1895 general election: East Perthshire
| Party | Candidate | Votes | % | ±% |
|---|---|---|---|---|
| Liberal | John Kinloch | 3,410 | 57.4 | −1.3 |
| Conservative | William Lindsay Boase | 2,535 | 42.6 | +1.3 |
| Majority | | 875 | 14.8 | −2.6 |
| Turnout | | 5,945 | 77.8 | −1.5 |
| Registered electors | | 7,641 | | |
| Liberal hold | | Swing | -1.3 | |

=== Elections in the 1900s ===
1900 general election: East Perthshire
| Party | Candidate | Votes | % | ±% |
|---|---|---|---|---|
| Liberal | John Kinloch | 3,185 | 59.8 | +2.4 |
| Conservative | John Graham Stewart | 2,143 | 40.2 | −2.4 |
| Majority | | 1,042 | 19.6 | +4.8 |
| Turnout | | 5,328 | 71.4 | −6.4 |
| Registered electors | | 7,463 | | |
| Liberal hold | | Swing | +2.4 | |

Buchanan

1903 East Perthshire by-election
| Party | Candidate | Votes | % | ±% |
|---|---|---|---|---|
| Liberal | Thomas Buchanan | Unopposed | | |
| Liberal hold | | | | |

1906 general election: East Perthshire
| Party | Candidate | Votes | % | ±% |
|---|---|---|---|---|
| Liberal | Thomas Buchanan | 3,738 | 58.5 | −1.3 |
| Conservative | John Stewart-Murray | 2,648 | 41.5 | +1.3 |
| Majority | | 1,090 | 17.0 | −2.6 |
| Turnout | | 6,386 | 81.6 | +10.2 |
| Registered electors | | 7,825 | | |
| Liberal hold | | Swing | −1.3 | |

=== Elections in the 1910s ===
Young

January 1910 general election: East Perthshire
| Party | Candidate | Votes | % | ±% |
|---|---|---|---|---|
| Liberal | William Young | 3,884 | 59.0 | +0.5 |
| Conservative | Alexander David Murray | 2,703 | 41.0 | −0.5 |
| Majority | | 1,181 | 18.0 | +1.0 |
| Turnout | | 6,587 | 83.4 | +1.8 |
| Liberal hold | | Swing | +0.5 | |

December 1910 general election: East Perthshire
| Party | Candidate | Votes | % | ±% |
|---|---|---|---|---|
| Liberal | William Young | 3,658 | 56.4 | −2.6 |
| Conservative | Noel Skelton | 2,826 | 43.6 | +2.6 |
| Majority | | 832 | 12.8 | −5.2 |
| Turnout | | 6,484 | 80.2 | −3.2 |
| Liberal hold | | Swing | -2.6 | |

General Election 1914–15:

Another General Election was required to take place before the end of 1915. The political parties had been making preparations for an election to take place and by July 1914, the following candidates had been selected;

- Liberal:William Young
- Unionist: Noel Skelton
