= William Young (Scottish politician) =

Scottish politician

Member of Parliament for Perth East Perthshire (1910–18)
- In office 15 January 1910 – 15 November 1922
- Preceded by: Thomas Buchanan
- Succeeded by: Noel Skelton

Personal details
- Born: 5 February 1863
- Died: 7 June 1942 (aged 79)
- Party: Liberal
- Other political affiliations: Coalition Liberal (1916–1922); National Liberal (1922–1923)

William Young (5 February 1863 – 7 June 1942) was a Scottish Liberal Party politician who served as the MP in the parliament of the United Kingdom in representation of two constituencies in Perthshire.

== Political career ==
He was first elected for East Perthshire at the January 1910 general election, and held the seat until the constituency was abolished in boundary changes for the 1918 general election.

He was then returned unopposed for the similar constituency of Perth as a supporter of David Lloyd George's coalition government. He retired from the House of Commons at the 1922 general election.

== Personal life and death ==
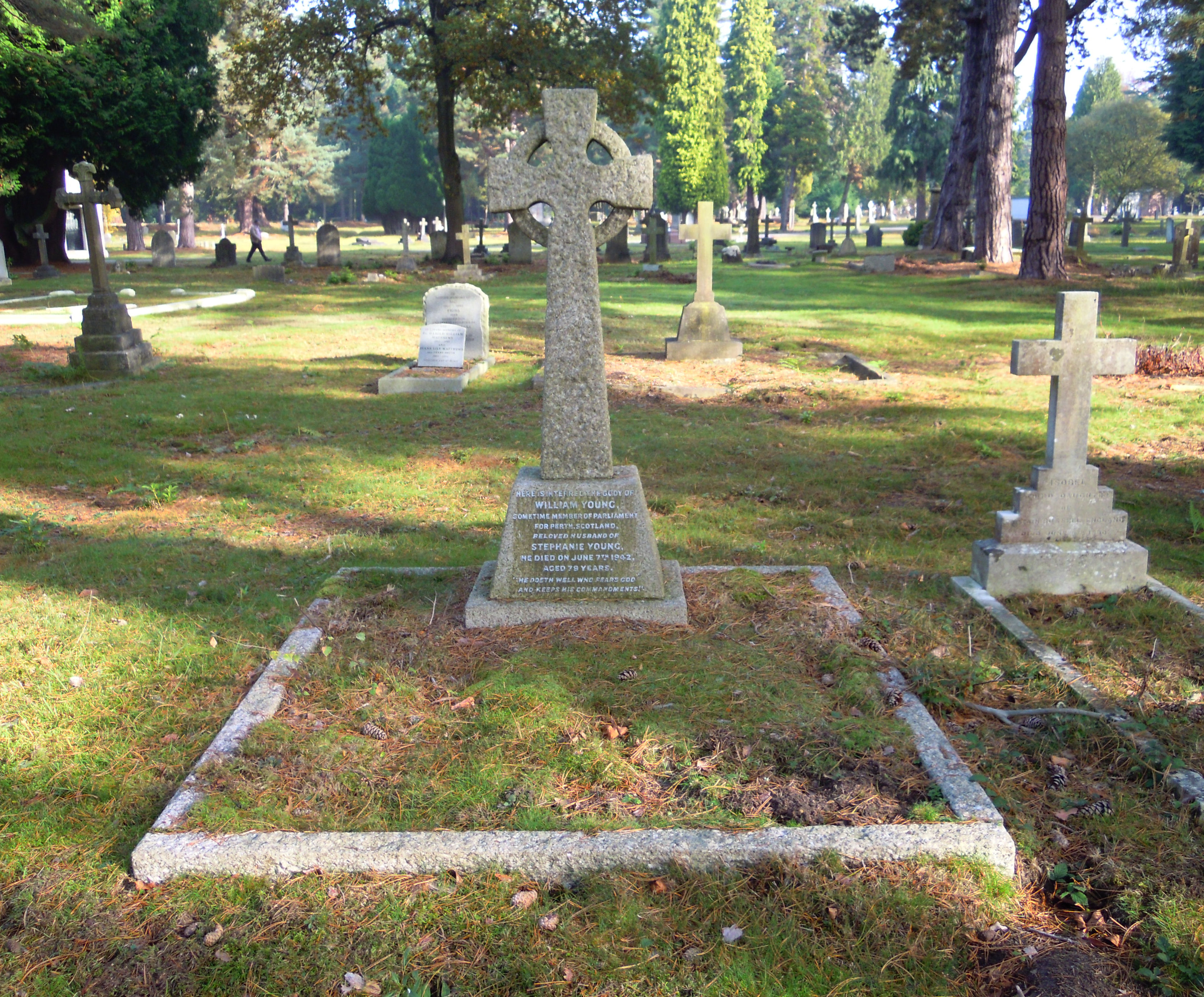
Young's grave in Brookwood Cemetery

He is buried in Brookwood Cemetery.

Parliament of the United Kingdom
Preceded by Thomas Buchanan	Member of Parliament for East Perthshire; 1910 – 1918	Succeeded by Himself as MP for Perth (County constituency)
Preceded by Himself as MP for East Perthshire	Member of Parliament for Perth; 1918 – 1922	Succeeded by Noel Skelton
Preceded by Frederick Whyte as MP for Perth (Burgh constituency)	Member of Parliament for Perth; 1918 – 1922	Succeeded by Noel Skelton
