= Aberdeenshire (UK Parliament constituency) =

Parliamentary constituency in the United Kingdom, 1801–1868

- Former county constituency for the House of Commons
- Subdivision: Aberdeenshire

1708–1868
- Seats: One
- Replaced by: Eastern Aberdeenshire; Western Aberdeenshire

Aberdeenshire was a Scottish county constituency of the House of Commons of the Parliament of Great Britain from 1708 to 1800 and of the House of Commons of the Parliament of the United Kingdom from 1801 until 1868.

In 1868, it was divided to create Eastern Aberdeenshire and Western Aberdeenshire.

== Creation ==
The British parliamentary constituency was created in 1708 following the Acts of Union 1707 and replaced the former Parliament of Scotland shire constituency of Aberdeenshire.

== Boundaries ==
When created in 1708, the constituency covered the county of Aberdeen minus the burgh of Aberdeen, which was part of the Aberdeen Burghs constituency.

Under the Representation of the People (Scotland) Act 1832 the Aberdeen burgh constituency was created to cover the burgh plus areas previously within the Aberdeenshire constituency.

== History ==
The constituency elected one Member of Parliament (MP) by the first past the post system until the seat was abolished for the 1868 general election.

In 1868, the Representation of the People (Scotland) Act 1868 divided Aberdeenshire to form Eastern Aberdeenshire and Western Aberdeenshire, and these new constituencies were first used in the 1868 general election.

== Members of Parliament ==
| Election | Member | Party | Notes |
|---|---|---|---|
| 1708 | Lord Haddo | Tory | |
| 1709 by-election | Sir Alexander Cumming, Bt | Tory | |
| 1722 | Sir Archibald Grant, Bt | Opposition Whig | expelled due to his role in the Charitable Corporation |
| 1732 by-election | Sir Arthur Forbes, Bt | Whig | |
| 1747 | Andrew Mitchell | Whig | MP for Elgin Burghs 1755–1771 |
| 1754 | Lord Adam Gordon | Pro-Administration | MP for Kincardineshire 1774–1788 |
| 1768 | Alexander Garden | Independent | |
| 1786 by-election | George Skene | Whig | MP for Elgin Burghs 1806–1807 |
| 1790 | James Ferguson | Tory | MP for Banffshire 1789–1790 |
| Sept 1820 by-election | William Gordon | Tory | Royal Navy officer, Commander-in-Chief, The Nore |
| 1834 | William Gordon | Conservative | Royal Navy officer, Commander-in-Chief, The Nore |
| 1854 by-election | Lord Haddo | Peelite | succeeded as Earl of Aberdeen in 1860 |
| 1859 | Lord Haddo | Liberal | succeeded as Earl of Aberdeen in 1860 |
| 1861 by-election | William Leslie | Conservative | resigned May 1866 |
| 1866 by-election | William Dingwall Fordyce | Liberal | afterwards MP for East Aberdeenshire |
| 1868 | constituency divided: see Eastern Aberdeenshire and Western Aberdeenshire | | |

== Election results ==
=== Elections in the 1830s ===
General election 1830: Aberdeenshire
| Party | Candidate | Votes | % |
|---|---|---|---|
| Tory | William Gordon | Unopposed | |
| Registered electors | | 184 | |
| Tory hold | | | |

General election 1831: Aberdeenshire
| Party | Candidate | Votes | % |
|---|---|---|---|
| Tory | William Gordon | 75 | 68.2 |
| Whig | Sir Michael Bruce, 8th Baronet | 32 | 29.1 |
| Tory | John Gordon | 3 | 2.7 |
| Majority | | 43 | 39.1 |
| Turnout | | 110 | 59.8 |
| Registered electors | | 184 | |
| Tory hold | | | |

General election 1832: Aberdeenshire
| Party | Candidate | Votes | % | ±% |
|---|---|---|---|---|
| Tory | William Gordon | 1,183 | 54.1 | −14.1 |
| Whig | Sir Michael Bruce, 8th Baronet | 1,002 | 45.9 | +16.8 |
| Majority | | 181 | 8.2 | −30.9 |
| Turnout | | 2,185 | 96.2 | +36.4 |
| Registered electors | | 2,271 | | |
| Tory hold | | Swing | −15.5 | |

General election 1835: Aberdeenshire
| Party | Candidate | Votes | % |
|---|---|---|---|
| Conservative | William Gordon | Unopposed | |
| Registered electors | | 2,271 | |
| Conservative hold | | | |

General election 1837: Aberdeenshire
| Party | Candidate | Votes | % |
|---|---|---|---|
| Conservative | William Gordon | 1,220 | 60.2 |
| Whig | Sir Thomas Burnett, 8th Baronet | 807 | 39.8 |
| Majority | | 413 | 20.4 |
| Turnout | | 2,027 | 67.7 |
| Registered electors | | 2,996 | |
| Conservative hold | | | |

=== Elections in the 1840s ===
General election 1841: Aberdeenshire
| Party | Candidate | Votes | % | ±% |
|---|---|---|---|---|
| Conservative | William Gordon | Unopposed | | |
| Registered electors | | 3,181 | | |
| Conservative hold | | | | |

Gordon was appointed a Lord Commissioner of the Admiralty, requiring a by-election.

By-election, 21 September 1841: Aberdeenshire
| Party | Candidate | Votes | % | ±% |
|---|---|---|---|---|
| Conservative | William Gordon | Unopposed | | |
| Conservative hold | | | | |

General election 1847: Aberdeenshire
| Party | Candidate | Votes | % | ±% |
|---|---|---|---|---|
| Conservative | William Gordon | Unopposed | | |
| Registered electors | | 3,694 | | |
| Conservative hold | | | | |

=== Elections in the 1850s ===
General election 1852: Aberdeenshire
| Party | Candidate | Votes | % | ±% |
|---|---|---|---|---|
| Conservative | William Gordon | Unopposed | | |
| Registered electors | | 4,022 | | |
| Conservative hold | | | | |

Gordon resigned by accepting the office of Steward of the Chiltern Hundreds, causing a by-election.

By-election, 22 August 1854: Aberdeenshire
| Party | Candidate | Votes | % | ±% |
|---|---|---|---|---|
| Peelite | George Hamilton-Gordon | Unopposed | | |
| Peelite gain from Conservative | | | | |

General election 1857: Aberdeenshire
| Party | Candidate | Votes | % | ±% |
|---|---|---|---|---|
| Peelite | George Hamilton-Gordon | Unopposed | | |
| Registered electors | | 4,682 | | |
| Peelite gain from Conservative | | | | |

General election 1859: Aberdeenshire
| Party | Candidate | Votes | % | ±% |
|---|---|---|---|---|
| Liberal | George Hamilton-Gordon | Unopposed | | |
| Registered electors | | 4,952 | | |
| Liberal hold | | | | |

=== Elections in the 1860s ===
Hamilton-Gordon succeeded as 5th Earl of Aberdeen, and had thus become ineligible to sit in the House of Commons. The ensuing by-election was won by the Conservative candidate, William Leslie.

By-election, 13 February 1861: Aberdeenshire
| Party | Candidate | Votes | % | ±% |
|---|---|---|---|---|
| Conservative | William Leslie | 851 | 56.1 | New |
| Liberal | Arthur Hamilton-Gordon | 665 | 43.9 | N/A |
| Majority | | 186 | 12.2 | N/A |
| Turnout | | 1,516 | 30.8 | N/A |
| Registered electors | | 4,928 | | |
| Conservative gain from Liberal | | Swing | N/A | |

General election 1865: Aberdeenshire
| Party | Candidate | Votes | % | ±% |
|---|---|---|---|---|
| Conservative | William Leslie | Unopposed | | |
| Registered electors | | 4,384 | | |
| Conservative gain from Liberal | | | | |

Leslie resigned, causing a by-election.

By-election, 15 May 1866: Aberdeenshire
| Party | Candidate | Votes | % | ±% |
|---|---|---|---|---|
| Liberal | William Dingwall Fordyce | 2,175 | 66.7 | New |
| Conservative | James Dalrymple-Horn-Elphinstone | 1,088 | 33.3 | N/A |
| Majority | | 1,087 | 33.4 | N/A |
| Turnout | | 3,263 | 73.4 | N/A |
| Registered electors | | 4,447 | | |
| Liberal gain from Conservative | | Swing | N/A | |

== See also ==
- Former United Kingdom Parliament constituencies
