= 1875 East Aberdeenshire by-election =

UK Parliamentary by-election

The 1875 East Aberdeenshire by-election was fought on 22 December 1875. The by-election was fought due to the death of the incumbent Liberal MP, William Dingwall Fordyce. It was won by the Conservative candidate Alexander Hamilton-Gordon.
