= Alexander Hamilton-Gordon (British Army officer, born 1817) =

British Army officer and politician

General The Honourable Sir Alexander Hamilton-Gordon KCB
- Born: 11 December 1817
- Died: 18 May 1890 (aged 72)
- Military career
- Allegiance: United Kingdom
- Branch: British Army
- Rank: General
- Commands: Eastern District
- Conflicts: Crimean War
- Awards: Knight Commander of the Order of the Bath

General Sir Alexander Hamilton-Gordon, KCB (11 December 1817 – 18 May 1890) was a British Army officer and politician.

== Military career ==
Hamilton-Gordon was the second son of Prime Minister George Hamilton-Gordon, 4th Earl of Aberdeen, by his second marriage to Harriet, daughter of the Hon. John Douglas. Arthur Hamilton-Gordon, 1st Baron Stanmore, was his younger brother. He served in the British Army and saw action at the Battle of Balaclava in October 1854 during the Crimean War. He went on to be General Officer Commanding Eastern District in January 1872.

Apart from his military career, Hamilton-Gordon was also an Honorary Equerry to Queen Victoria and sat as Member of Parliament for Aberdeenshire East from 1875 to 1885. He was at first a Conservative until he defected to become a Liberal in 1879.

Hamilton-Gordon married Caroline Emilia Mary, daughter of Margaret and Sir John Herschel, 1st Baronet and grand daughter of astronomer William Herschel, in 1852. They had five sons and four daughters. His eldest son Alexander also became a successful soldier. Hamilton-Gordon died in May 1890, aged 72. Lady Hamilton-Gordon survived him by 19 years and died in January 1909.

== See also ==
- Marquess of Aberdeen and Temair

== Notes ==
Military offices
Preceded by Freeman Murray	GOC Eastern District; January 1872 – April 1872	Succeeded by Sir Edward Greathed
Parliament of the United Kingdom
Preceded by William Dingwall Fordyce	Member of Parliament for Aberdeenshire East; 1875 – 1885	Succeeded by Peter Esslemont
