= William Leslie (MP) =

Scottish politician (1814–1880)

Member of Parliament for Aberdeenshire
- In office 13 February 1861 – 15 May 1866
- Preceded by: Lord Haddo
- Succeeded by: William Dingwall Fordyce

Personal details
- Born: 16 March 1814
- Died: 4 March 1880 (aged 65)
- Party: Conservative

William Leslie (16 March 1814 – 4 March 1880), was a Scottish Conservative Party politician.

Leslie was elected Conservative MP for Aberdeenshire at a by-election in 1861—caused by the succession of George Hamilton-Gordon to 5th Earl of Aberdeen—and held the seat until 1866 when he resigned.

Parliament of the United Kingdom
Preceded by Lord Haddo	Member of Parliament for Aberdeenshire; 1861–1866	Succeeded by William Dingwall Fordyce
