= Maconochie =

British canned stew of the early 20th century

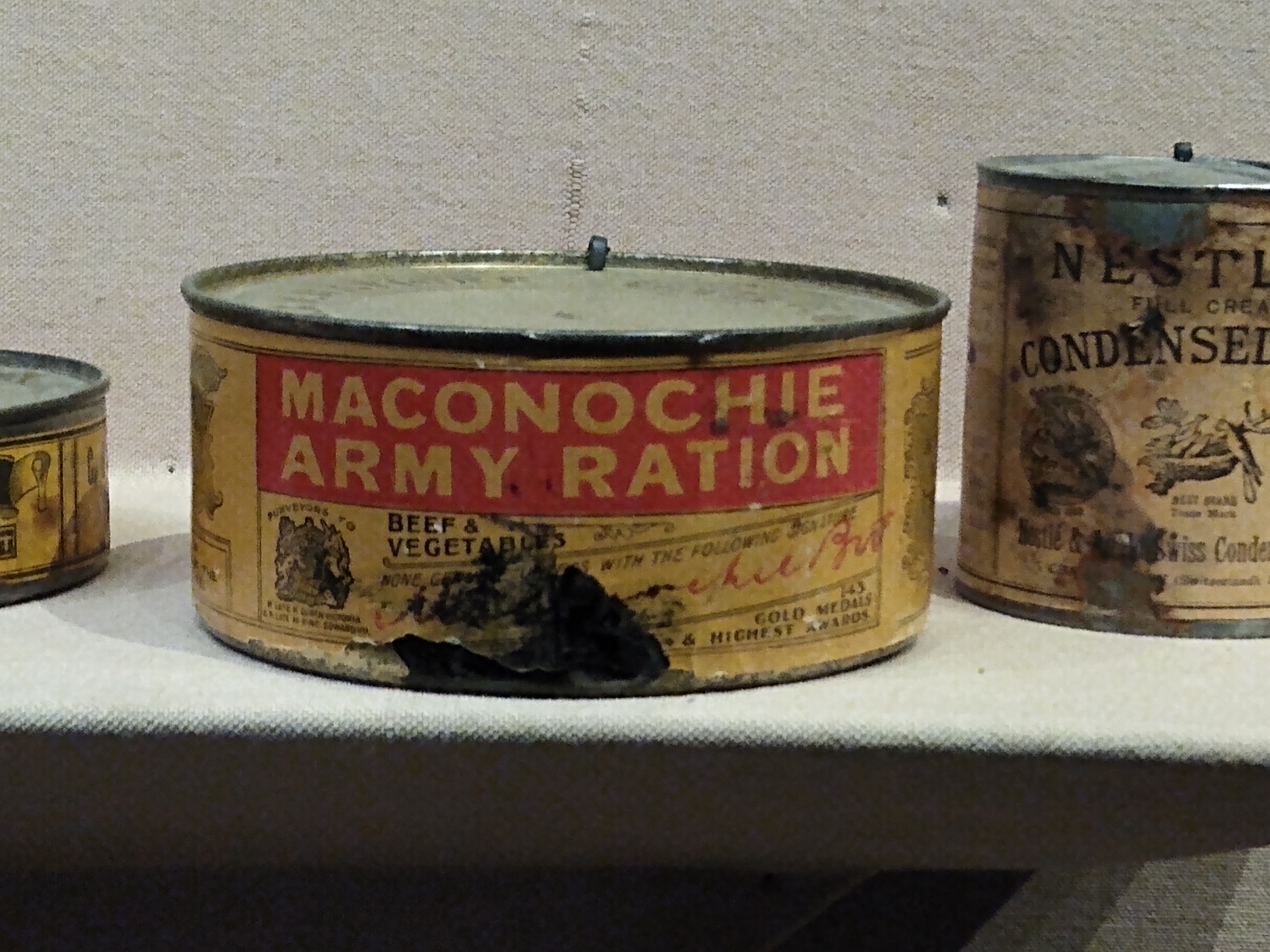
- A can of Maconochie issued as a military ration, displayed in the Imperial War Museum
- Type: Stew
- Place of origin: Scotland
- Created by: Maconochie Company

Maconochie was a brand of canned stew containing sliced turnips, carrots, potatoes, onions, haricot beans, and beef in a thin broth, named after the Aberdeen-based Maconochie Company that produced it. The stew gained recognition as a widely-issued military ration for British soldiers during the Boer War and World War I.

Although the stew was said to be tolerable, most soldiers detested it. As one British soldier put it, "warmed in the tin, Maconochie was edible; cold, it was a man-killer." Others complained that the potatoes appeared to be unidentifiable black lumps. The congelation of fat above indistinguishable chunks of meat and vegetables led one reporter to describe it as "an inferior grade of garbage". A soldier named Calcutt claimed "the Maconochie's stew ration gave the troops flatulence of a particularly offensive nature."

Though we reckoned in the trenches the Maconochie tin of meat and veg was a banquet in its own way, but most of the contractors who fed us should have had their money stuffed into a couple of kit-bags round their necks and chucked into the deepest hole in no-mans land.

Some product versions that contained turnips were said to possess an unpleasant smell when combined with beans. Barbara Buchan from the Fraserburgh Heritage Centre confirmed that their records contain only a single positive response to the product.

An alternative view is voiced by Lance-Corporal Henry Buckle in his diary of April 1915: "Had a glorious meal today, got a Machonachie [sic] ration from some engineers in the wood, a round tin containing meat, spuds carrots, beans and gravy, enough for two in a tin. This is the first time we (the poor infantry) have seen one, had a real blow out, must try and get another. They are the goods, believe me!"

== See also ==
- Bully beef
- Potted meat
- Archibald White Maconochie
