= James Annand =

Scottish politician (1843–1906)

James Annand MP
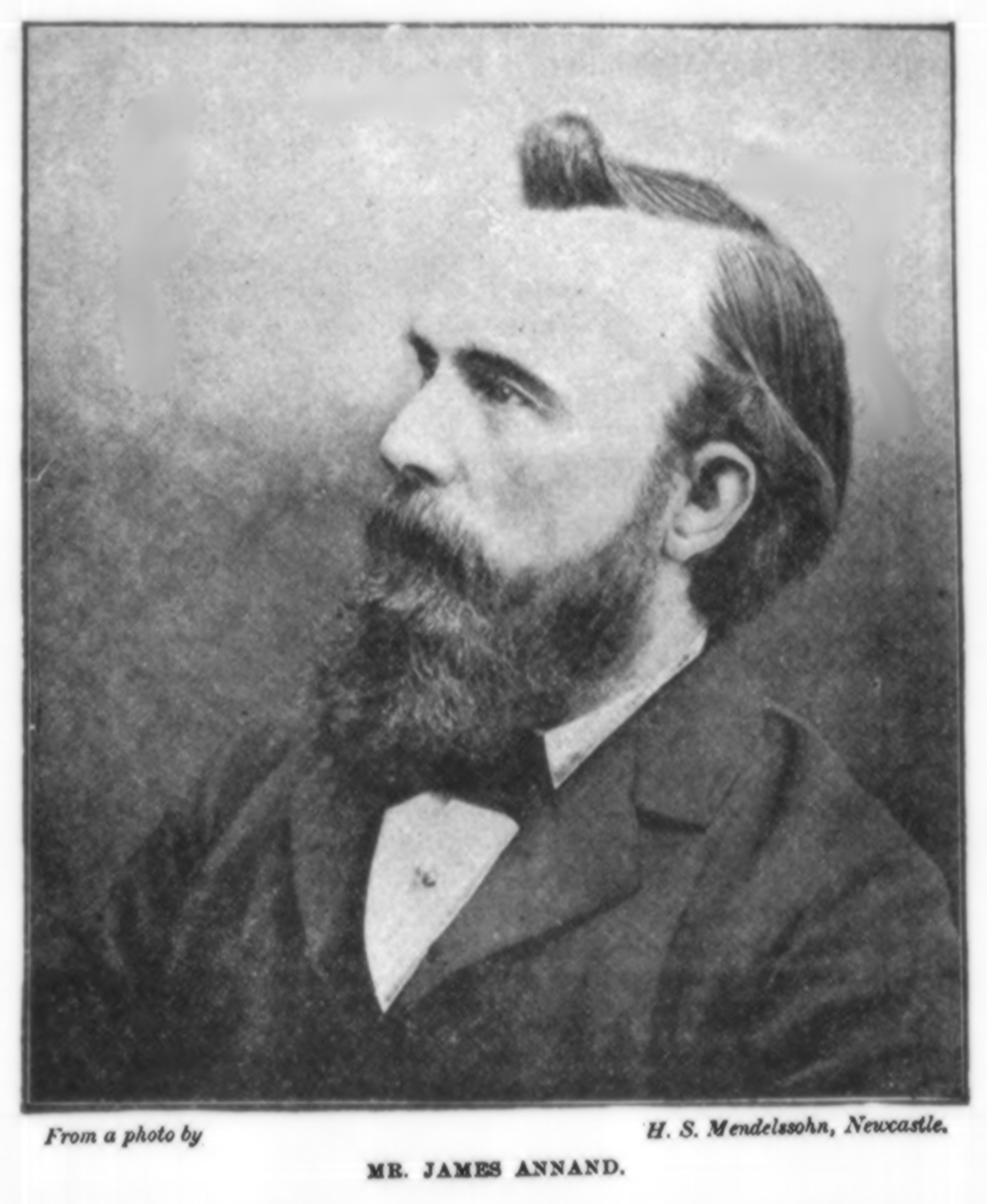

Member of Parliament for East Aberdeenshire
- In office 12 January 1906 – 9 February 1906
- Preceded by: Archibald White Maconochie
- Succeeded by: James Murray

Personal details
- Born: 26 June 1843 Longside, Aberdeenshire, Scotland
- Died: 6 February 1906 (aged 62) London, England
- Party: Liberal

James Annand (26 June 1843 – 9 February 1906) was a Scottish journalist, newspaper editor and Liberal Party politician.

== Life and career ==
James Annand was born on 26 June 1843 in Longside, Aberdeenshire, Scotland, as the eldest son of Robert Annand and Margaret Moir. Annand began his working life following in his father's trade as a blacksmith in Longside. He bought a share of the Buchan Observer and became its editor for about six years. Thereafter, he edited several newspapers in North East England; Joseph Cowen appointed Annand as the editor of the Newcastle Daily Chronicle in 1874, but an argument between the two, which stemmed from Cowen's Russophobia, led to Annand leaving the paper in 1879. Annand edited the South Shields Gazette from 1875 to 1885, when he was succeeded by Robert Spence Watson. From 1885 to 1895, Annand was the editor of the Northern Weekly Leader. Annand was also asked to be the editor of The Echo, but he refused.

After an unsuccessful bid for a parliamentary seat in Tynemouth in 1892, Annand was elected at the general election in January 1906 as the Member of Parliament (MP) for East Aberdeenshire. He died in London sixteen days later, before he had an opportunity to take his seat, thus becoming one of the shortest-serving MPs in history.

His brother, Robert Cumming Annand, was also involved in the newspaper industry.

James Annand was briefly married to Mary Hannah Burt in 1899 until her death in 1900.

== See also ==
- List of United Kingdom MPs with the shortest service

Parliament of the United Kingdom
Preceded by Archibald White Maconochie	Member of Parliament for East Aberdeenshire; January 1906 – February 1906	Succeeded by James Murray
