= Thomas Buchanan (Liberal politician) =

Scottish politician

The Right Honourable Thomas Buchanan FRSE

Financial Secretary to the War Office
- In office 1905–1908
- Monarch: Edward VII
- Prime Minister: Sir Henry Campbell-Bannerman
- Preceded by: William Bromley-Davenport
- Succeeded by: Francis Dyke Acland

Personal details
- Born: 2 April 1846
- Died: 7 April 1911 (aged 65)
- Party: Liberal (-1886; 1888-); Liberal Unionist (1886-1888)
- Education: Balliol College, Oxford

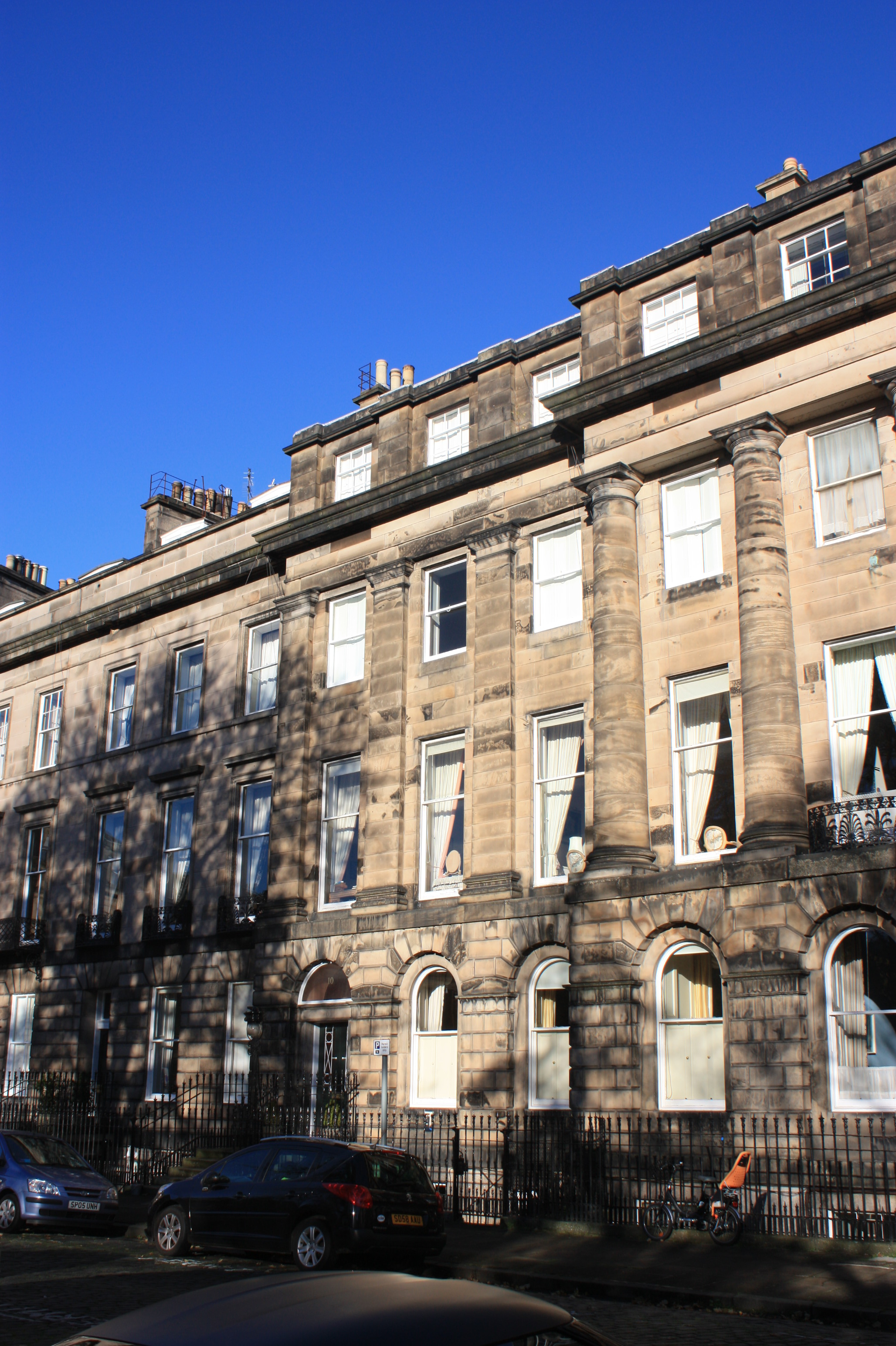
Buchanan's Edinburgh house at 10 Moray Place

Thomas Ryburn Buchanan PC FRSE (2 April 1846 – 7 April 1911) was a Scottish Liberal politician and bibliophile.

== Background and education ==
He was born in Glasgow the son of John Buchanan of Dowanhill. His brother was the eminent chemist and explorer John Young Buchanan (1844–1925).

He was educated at Sherborne School and Balliol College, Oxford. He later became a Fellow of All Souls College, Oxford, and was called to the Bar.

== Political career ==
In 1880 Buchanan unsuccessfully contested Haddington in the 1880 general election but was successfully returned to Parliament for Edinburgh in an 1881 by-election. This constituency was abolished in 1885 and he was elected for the newly created constituency of Edinburgh West as a Liberal Unionist. However, in 1888 Buchanan announced that he supported William Ewart Gladstone's Home Rule policy. He resigned his seat and was elected by a narrow majority as a Gladstonian and Home Ruler the same year.

Buchanan lost the Edinburgh West seat in 1892 but returned to the House of Commons in December the same year when he was elected to represent Aberdeenshire East in a by-election. He lost this seat in the 1900 general election, and remained out of the House of Commons for the next three years. However, in February 1903 he was returned unopposed as the member for Perthshire East, a seat he held until 1910. When the Liberals came to power in December 1905, he was appointed Financial Secretary to the War Office by Prime Minister Sir Henry Campbell-Bannerman, a post he retained until April 1908. The latter month he was sworn of the Privy Council and made Under-Secretary of State for India by the new Prime Minister, H. H. Asquith. He remained in this post until June 1909.

== Personal life ==
Buchanan married on 15 August 1888 at Madron, Penzance, Cornwall, to Emily Octavia Bolitho, of Trengwainton, daughter of Thomas S. Bolitho. They lived at 10 Moray Place on the prestigious Moray Estate in Edinburgh's West End and 12 South Street in Mayfair. He was a noted collector of books and manuscripts. Some of his collections were donated by his widow to the University of Edinburgh and the Bodleian Library, Oxford, after his death. He died on 7 April 1911 in Bournemouth in Hampshire and was buried in the churchyard of St Bartholomew's Church at Arborfield in Berkshire where his sister lived.

Parliament of the United Kingdom
Preceded by James Cowan; John McLaren	Member of Parliament for Edinburgh; 1881–1885; With: James Cowan 1881–1882; Samuel Danks Waddy 1882–1885	Constituency abolished
New constituency	Member of Parliament for Edinburgh West; 1885–1892	Succeeded by Viscount Wolmer
Preceded by Peter Esslemont	Member of Parliament for Aberdeenshire East; 1892–1900	Succeeded by Archibald White Maconochie
Preceded by Sir John Kinloch	Member of Parliament for Perthshire East; 1903–Jan. 1910	Succeeded by William Young
Political offices
Preceded by William Bromley-Davenport	Financial Secretary to the War Office; 1905–1908	Succeeded by Francis Dyke Acland
Preceded by Charles Hobhouse	Under-Secretary of State for India; 1908–1909	Succeeded by The Master of Elibank
