= Robert Tuite Boothby =

British banker (1871 – 1941)

Sir Robert Tuite Boothby KBE (29 June 1871 – 7 February 1941) was a British banker.

== Career ==
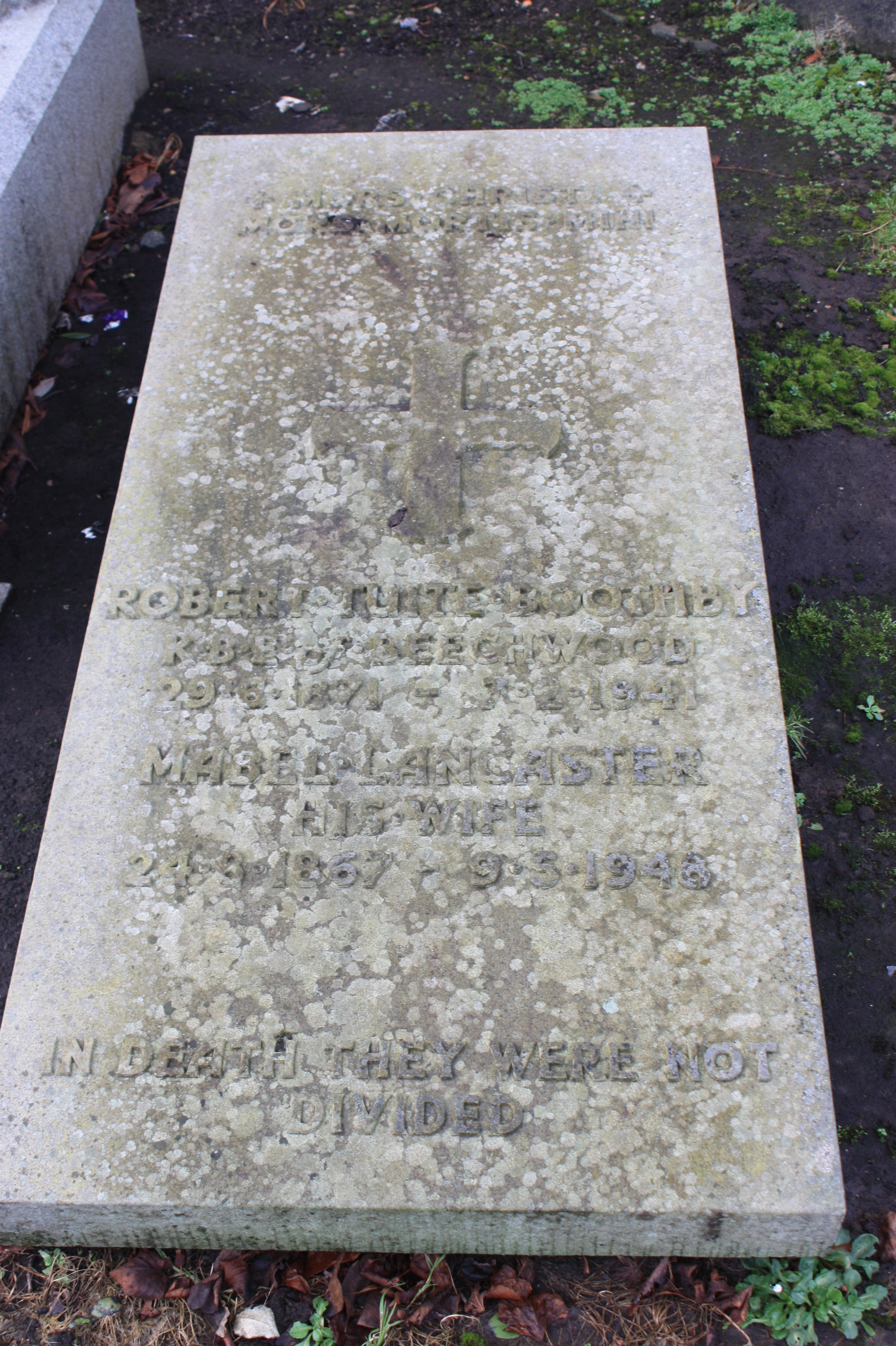
The grave of Robert Tuite Boothby, Corstorphine, Edinburgh

He was born in St Andrews in Fife, the son of Col Robert Tod Boothby of the Royal Artillery, and his wife Madeline Condie.

Boothby studied at the University of St Andrews. He was the manager of the Scottish Provident Institution from 1920 to 1940, and a director of the Bank of Scotland. He was knighted as a Knight Commander of the Order of the British Empire in 1929, and was also a member of the Royal Company of Archers.

He lived in Beechwood House in Corstorphine, previously the home of Sir Alexander Asher.

He is buried with his wife in Corstorphine churchyard in Edinburgh immediately east of the church.

== Family ==
His brother-in-law was James Graham Watson, his predecessor at Scottish Life.

He married Mabel Lancaster, daughter of Henry Hill Lancaster, on 27 September 1898. They had one son, Robert Boothby, born in 1900.
