= Aberdeen and Kincardine East (UK Parliament constituency) =

Parliamentary constituency in the United Kingdom, 1918–1950

East Aberdeenshire and Kincardineshire
- Former county constituency for the House of Commons
- Subdivision: Aberdeenshire, Kincardineshire

1918–1950
- Seats: One
- Created from: Eastern Aberdeenshire
- Replaced by: East Aberdeenshire

Aberdeen and Kincardine East (or East Aberdeenshire and Kincardineshire) was a county constituency of the House of Commons of the Parliament of the United Kingdom from 1918 to 1950. The constituency elected one Member of Parliament (MP) by the first past the post system of election.

As created in 1918, the constituency was largely a replacement for Eastern Aberdeenshire. In 1950, it was replaced by East Aberdeenshire.

== Boundaries ==
Aberdeen and Kincardine East was created by the Representation of the People Act 1918 and first used in the 1918 general election. The constituency was entirely within the county of Aberdeen and one of five constituencies covering the county of Aberdeen, the county of city of Aberdeen and the county of Kincardine (except that the Kincardine burgh of Inverbervie was part of a sixth constituency, Montrose Burghs). Also entirely within the county of Aberdeen, there was Aberdeen and Kincardine Central. Kincardine and West Aberdeenshire covered the county of Kincardine (minus the burgh of Inverbervie) and part of the county of Aberdeen.

Aberdeen and Kincardine East consisted of "The county districts of Deer and Turriff, inclusive of all burghs situated therein." Therefore, it included the burghs of Fraserburgh, Peterhead, Rosehearty and Turriff.

The same boundaries were used in the 1922 general election, the 1923 general election, the 1924 general election, the 1929 general election, the 1931 general election, the 1935 general election and the 1945 general election.

The House of Commons (Redistribution of Seats) Act 1949 created new boundaries for the 1950 general election. Aberdeen and Kincardine East was merged with part of Aberdeen and Kincardine Central to form East Aberdeenshire, which was one of four constituencies covering the county of Aberdeen and the county of city of Aberdeen. East Aberdeenshire and West Aberdeenshire were entirely within the county of Aberdeen, and Aberdeen North and Aberdeen South were entirely within the county of city of Aberdeen.

== Members of Parliament ==
| Election | Member | Party |
|---|---|---|
| 1918 | Henry Cowan | Coalition Liberal |
| 1922 | Henry Cowan | National Liberal |
| 1922 | Frederick Martin | Liberal |
| 1924 | Robert Boothby | Unionist |
| 1950 | constituency abolished | |

== Election results ==
=== Elections in the 1910s ===
Sir Henry Cowan

General election 1918: Aberdeen and Kincardine East
| Party | | Candidate | Votes | % |
|---|---|---|---|---|
| C | National Liberal | Henry Cowan | 4,430 | 50.5 |
| | Liberal | Falconer Lewis Wallace | 4,343 | 49.5 |
| Majority | | | 87 | 1.0 |
| Turnout | | | 8,773 | |
| | National Liberal win (new seat) | | | |
C indicates candidate endorsed by the coalition government.

=== Elections in the 1920s ===
Frederick Martin

General election 1922: Aberdeen and Kincardine East
| Party | Candidate | Votes | % | ±% |
|---|---|---|---|---|
| Liberal | Frederick Martin | 8,018 | 60.5 | +11.0 |
| National Liberal | Henry Cowan | 5,227 | 39.5 | –11.0 |
| Majority | | 2,791 | 21.0 | N/A |
| Turnout | | 13,245 | 45.5 | |
| Liberal gain from National Liberal | | Swing | +11.0 | |

General election 1923: Aberdeen and Kincardine East
| Party | Candidate | Votes | % | ±% |
|---|---|---|---|---|
| Liberal | Frederick Martin | 8,793 | 55.9 | −4.6 |
| Unionist | Falconer Lewis Wallace | 6,949 | 44.1 | New |
| Majority | | 1,844 | 11.8 | −9.2 |
| Turnout | | 15,742 | 57.6 | +12.1 |
| Liberal hold | | Swing | | |

General election 1924: Aberdeen and Kincardine East
| Party | Candidate | Votes | % | ±% |
|---|---|---|---|---|
| Unionist | Robert John Graham Boothby | 7,363 | 46.2 | +2.1 |
| Liberal | Frederick Martin | 4,680 | 29.4 | −26.5 |
| Labour | William Sloan Cormack | 3,899 | 24.4 | New |
| Majority | | 2,683 | 16.8 | N/A |
| Turnout | | 15,942 | 59.0 | +1.4 |
| Unionist gain from Liberal | | Swing | +14.3 | |

General election 1929: Aberdeenshire and Kincardine East
| Party | Candidate | Votes | % | ±% |
|---|---|---|---|---|
| Unionist | Robert John Graham Boothby | 13,354 | 56.9 | +10.7 |
| Labour | J.E. Hamilton | 10,110 | 43.1 | +18.7 |
| Majority | | 3,244 | 13.8 | −3.0 |
| Turnout | | 23,464 | | |
| Unionist hold | | Swing | −4.0 | |

=== Elections in the 1930s ===
General election 1931: Aberdeen and Kincardine East
| Party | Candidate | Votes | % | ±% |
|---|---|---|---|---|
| Unionist | Robert John Graham Boothby | 16,396 | 72.2 | +15.3 |
| Labour | Frederick Martin | 6,299 | 27.8 | −15.3 |
| Majority | | 10,097 | 44.4 | +30.6 |
| Turnout | | 22,695 | 80.5 | |
| Unionist hold | | Swing | | |

General election 1935: Aberdeen and Kincardine East
| Party | Candidate | Votes | % | ±% |
|---|---|---|---|---|
| Unionist | Robert John Graham Boothby | 12,748 | 57.0 | −15.2 |
| Labour | Frederick Martin | 9,627 | 43.0 | +15.2 |
| Majority | | 3,121 | 14.0 | −30.4 |
| Turnout | | 22,375 | 62.4 | −18.1 |
| Unionist hold | | Swing | | |

=== Elections in the 1940s ===
General election 1945: Aberdeen and Kincardine East
| Party | Candidate | Votes | % | ±% |
|---|---|---|---|---|
| Unionist | Robert John Graham Boothby | 13,290 | 54.9 | −2.1 |
| Labour | John R. Allen | 10,918 | 45.1 | +2.1 |
| Majority | | 2,372 | 9.8 | −4.2 |
| Turnout | | 24,208 | 66.0 | +3.6 |
| Unionist hold | | Swing | | |

== See also ==
- Former United Kingdom Parliament constituencies
