= George Hamilton-Gordon, 5th Earl of Aberdeen =

British peer and Liberal Party politician

The Right Honourable The Earl of Aberdeen MP
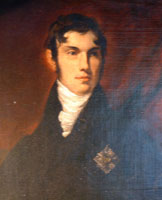
- George Hamilton-Gordon, 5th Earl of Aberdeen

Member of Parliament for Aberdeenshire
- In office 1854–1860
- Preceded by: William Gordon
- Succeeded by: William Leslie

Personal details
- Born: George John James Hamilton-Gordon; 28 September 1816 Bentley Priory, Hertfordshire, England
- Died: 22 March 1864 (aged 47) Haddo House, Aberdeenshire, Scotland
- Resting place: Methlick, Aberdeenshire, Scotland
- Party: Liberal Party
- Spouse: Mary Baillie
- Children: George Hamilton-Gordon, 6th Earl of Aberdeen; James Hamilton-Gordon; John Hamilton-Gordon, 1st Marquess of Aberdeen and Temair; Mary Hepburne-Scott, Lady Polwarth; Harriet Lindsay; Katherine Bruce, Lady Balfour of Burleigh
- Parent(s): George Hamilton-Gordon, 4th Earl of Aberdeen; Harriet Hamilton, Dowager Viscountess Hamilton
- Education: Harrow School; Trinity College, Cambridge

George John James Hamilton-Gordon, 5th Earl of Aberdeen MP (28 September 1816 – 22 March 1864), styled Lord Haddo before 1860, was a British peer and Liberal Party politician.

== Early life ==
Lord Haddo was born at Bentley Priory in Hertfordshire, the eldest son of the 4th Earl of Aberdeen and Harriet Hamilton, Dowager Viscountess Hamilton (née Harriet Douglas), widow of James Hamilton, Viscount Hamilton and granddaughter of James Douglas, 14th Earl of Morton. He was educated at Harrow School and Trinity College, Cambridge.

== Career ==
His uncle, William Gordon, had retired as Member of Parliament for Aberdeenshire in 1854 and Haddo put himself forward as his successor. However, Haddo had contracted what was probably tuberculosis, and he went to Egypt to spend a few months in a warm climate. Despite being absent from Scotland and not having canvassed the constituency, Haddo won the election and returned to take his seat in the House of Commons, in good health, a year later. He left the Commons after inheriting his father's title in 1860 and made a second trip to Egypt. Aberdeen had previously converted to Evangelicalism and it was in Egypt that he campaigned for the Coptics to convert to his own faith.

For part of his time in Egypt, he distributed Bibles with the American missionary Gulian Lansing, who later wrote a memoir about their journey.

Aberdeen later returned to Scotland and died at his home, Haddo House, in 1864. He was buried at Methlick and was succeeded by his eldest son, George. His last words were (when asked how he felt) "Perfectly comfortable". Hamilton-Gordon donated a large collection of antiquities that his father had collected to the British Museum in 1861.

== Marriage ==
Lord Haddo married at Taymouth Castle on 5 November 1840 Mary Baillie (a sister of the future 10th Earl of Haddington). They had six children:

- George Hamilton-Gordon, 6th Earl of Aberdeen (1841–1870); died unmarried.
- Lady Mary Hamilton-Gordon (1844–1914); married Walter Hepburne-Scott, 8th Lord Polwarth.
- Hon. James Henry Hamilton-Gordon (1845–1868); committed suicide, which was passed off as a rifle accident, in his rooms in Cambridge.
- John Campbell Hamilton-Gordon, 1st Marquess of Aberdeen and Temair (1847–1934)
- Lady Harriet Hamilton-Gordon (1849–1942); married William Lindsay.
- Lady Katherine Eliza Hamilton-Gordon (1852–1931); married Alexander Bruce, 6th Lord Balfour of Burleigh.

The Dowager Countess of Aberdeen survived her husband by 36 years, and died aged 85 at Kennet, the residence of her son-in-law Lord Balfour, on 3 April 1900.

== Arms ==
Coat of arms of George Hamilton-Gordon, 5th Earl of Aberdeen
Notes These supporters were granted to the 4th earl (as Viscount Gordon) and his successors in 1818 in place of the ancient supporters Dexter: A senator of the College of Justice and Sinister: A minister of state, each in his robes of office. Crest Dexter, Two arms, from the shoulder, naked, holding a bow proper, to let an arrow fly (Gordon); Sinister, Out of a ducal coronet or, an oak tree, the stem cut transversely by a frame saw, the blade inscribed with the word "through", all proper (Hamilton). Escutcheon Quarterly, 1st and 4th, Azure, three boars' heads couped within a double tressure flowered and counter-flowered with roses, thistles and fleurs-de-lys or (Gordon); 2nd & 3rd, Quarterly, first and fourth, gules, three cinquefoils pierced ermine, second and third, Argent, an ancient ship with sails furled sable the whole within a bordure of the last (Hamilton). Supporters Two antelopes argent, armed and unguled or, each gorged with a collar flory counterflory azure, charged with three roses or, and line reflexed over the back azure. Motto Fortuna sequatur (Let fortune follow). Alternatively: Ne Ninium (Not too much)

Parliament of the United Kingdom
Preceded by William Gordon	Member of Parliament for Aberdeenshire; 1854–1860	Succeeded by William Leslie
Peerage of Scotland
Preceded by George Hamilton-Gordon	Earl of Aberdeen; 1860–1864	Succeeded by George Hamilton-Gordon
