= Fedderate Castle =

Castle in Aberdeenshire, Scotland

- New Deer, Aberdeenshire, Scotland
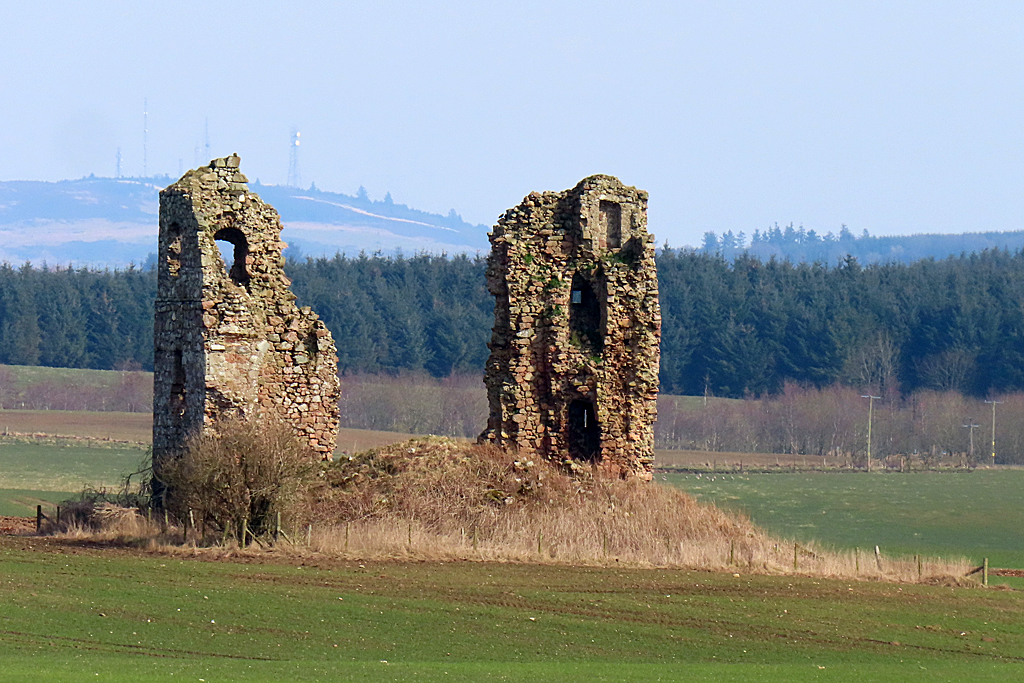
- The castle in 2025

Site information
- Type: L-Plan
- Condition: Ruined

Location
- Coordinates: 57.5386°N 2.1739°W

Site history
- Built: late 15th century

Scheduled monument
- Official name: Fedderate Castle
- Type: Secular: castle
- Designated: 14 March 1994
- Reference no.: SM5951

Fedderate Castle is a ruined castle near New Deer in Aberdeenshire, Scotland, dating to around 1474 and built by the Crawford family. It was extended by the family in 1519. A drawbridge and causeway provided access to the castle. The walls are up to 30 feet (9.1 m) tall and 6 feet (1.8 m) thick.

== History ==
On 15 December 1590, Robert Keith, the youngest brother of George Keith, 5th Earl Marischal, fled to Fedderate Castle after being dislodged from Deer Abbey, which he had seized the previous September in the course of a dispute over his inheritance.

Lord William Oliphant with Jacobite forces took control of Fedderate Castle and held out against the forces of Hugh Mackay for more than three weeks, surrendering in October 1690.

The castle is a scheduled monument. Its condition is the result of an attempt to blow up the structure, before its historic designation, "as an impediment to agriculture".

== Bibliography ==
- McKean, Charles (1990), Banff & Buchan, Royal Incorporation of Architects in Scotland, ISBN 978-1-85158-231-0
