= James Murray (Liberal politician) =

Scottish Liberal Party politician

Sir James Murray
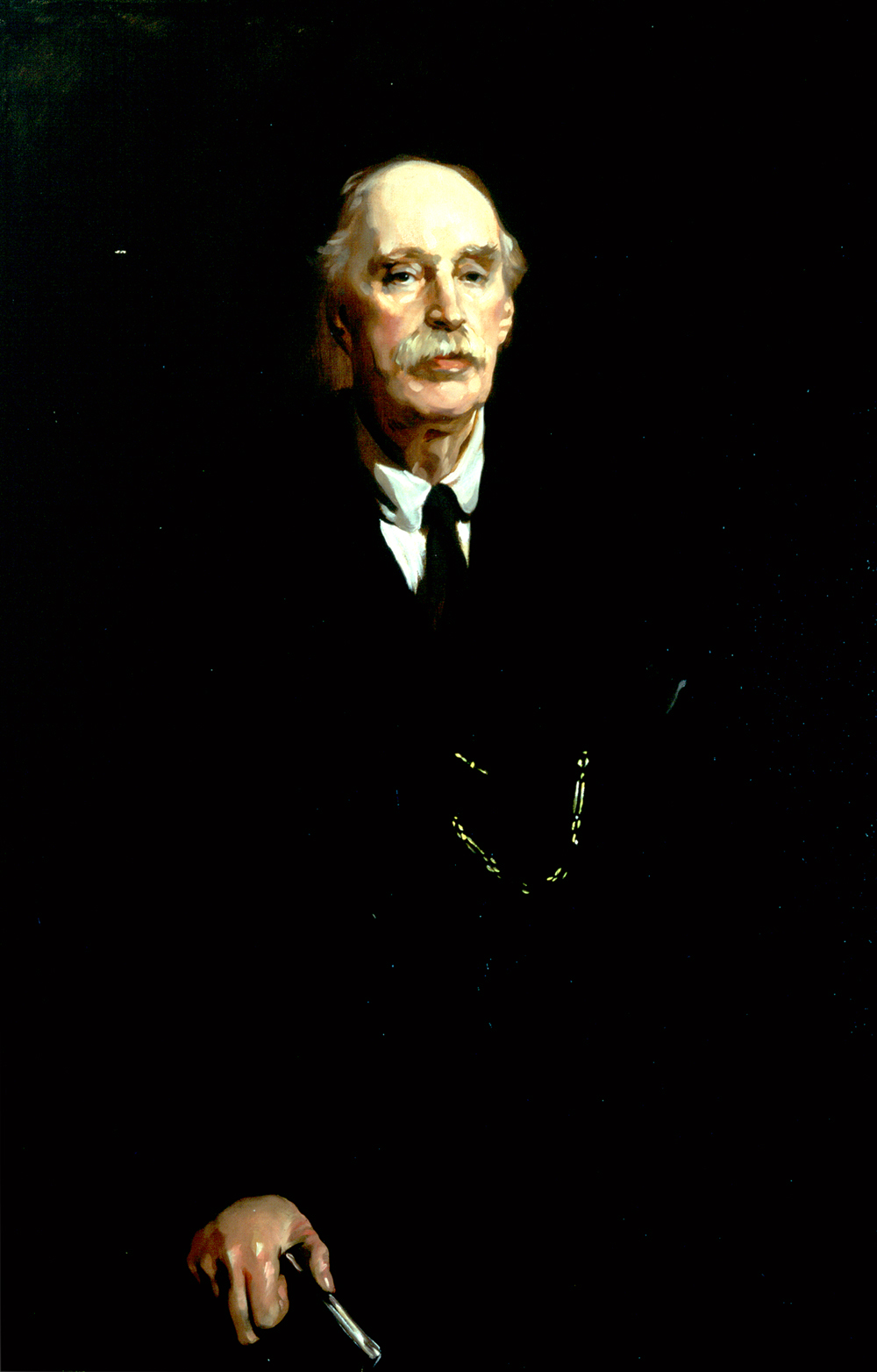
- Sir James Murray (1850–1933), DL, Chairman of Aberdeen Art Gallery Committee (1901–1928), 1919, by Glyn Philpot

Member of Parliament for East Aberdeenshire
- In office 28 February 1906 – 10 February 1910
- Preceded by: James Annand
- Succeeded by: Henry Cowan

Personal details
- Born: 19 September 1850
- Died: 12 April 1933 (aged 82)
- Party: Liberal

Sir James Murray (19 September 1850 – 12 April 1933) was a Scottish Liberal Party politician. He was elected unopposed as the Member of Parliament for East Aberdeenshire at a by-election in 1906, following the death of the Liberal MP James Annand, who had held the seat for only 16 days. He held the seat until the January 1910 general election, when he did not stand again.

He was knighted in 1915.

Parliament of the United Kingdom
Preceded by James Annand	Member of Parliament for East Aberdeenshire; 1906 – January 1910	Succeeded by Henry Cowan
