= Robert Stewart Menzies =

Scottish politician (1856–1889)

Robert Stewart Menzies (1856 – 25 January 1889) was a Scottish Liberal Party politician who sat in the House of Commons from 1885 to 1889.

== Early life ==
Menzies was the son of Graham Menzies (died 1880), an Edinburgh distiller of Hallyburton, Cupar Angus, and his wife Beatrice (d.1899), daughter of William Dudgeon, merchant of Leith, Edinburgh. He was educated at Harrow School, and at Christ Church, Oxford and was called to the bar at Lincoln's Inn in 1882. He was a J.P. for Perthshire and Forfar. Menzies was associated with the estate of Hallyburton House and the neighbouring estate of Pitcur Estate. He is listed as “of Hallyburton and Pitcur” for the Eastern Division of Perthshire.

In 1885, Menzies was elected Member of Parliament for East Perthshire. He held the seat until his death at the age of 33 in 1889. He was the uncle of Major-General Sir Stewart Menzies.

Parliament of the United Kingdom
New constituency Perthshire constituency divided	Member of Parliament for East Perthshire; 1885–1889	Succeeded by Sir John Kinloch
