= William Gordon (Royal Navy officer, born 1784) =

Scottish naval commander and Tory politician

Vice-Admiral The Honourable William Gordon
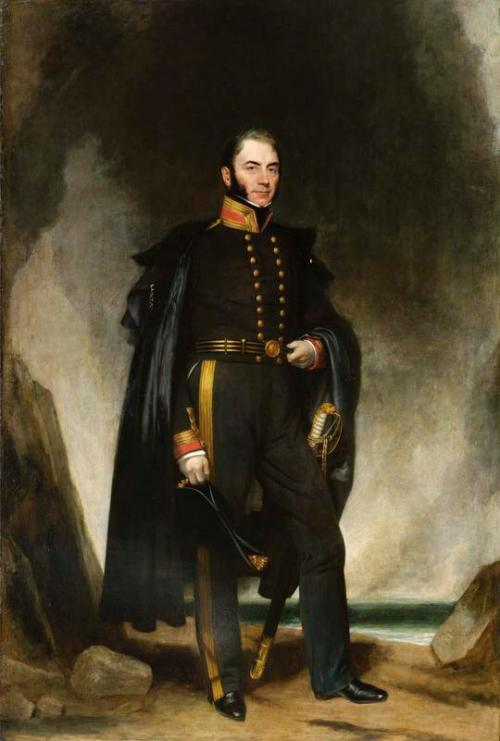
- Born: 18 December 1784
- Died: 3 February 1858 (aged 73)
- Military career
- Allegiance: United Kingdom
- Branch: Royal Navy
- Rank: Vice-Admiral
- Commands: Nore Command

Vice-Admiral William Gordon (18 December 1784 – 3 February 1858) was a Scottish naval commander and Tory politician.

== Naval career ==
Gordon was the second son of George Gordon, Lord Haddo, son of George Gordon, 3rd Earl of Aberdeen. His mother was Charlotte, daughter of William Baird, while Prime Minister George Hamilton-Gordon, 4th Earl of Aberdeen, and Sir Robert Gordon were his brothers. He joined the Royal Navy in 1797 and went on to be Fourth Naval Lord from 1841 to 1846 and Commander-in-Chief, The Nore from 1854 to 1857.

He was elected at a by-election in September 1820 as the member of parliament (MP) for Aberdeenshire, and held the seat until August 1854, when he resigned by taking the Chiltern Hundreds.

Gordon died in February 1858. Cape Gordon on Vega Island in the Antarctic is now named after him.

Parliament of the United Kingdom
Preceded by James Ferguson	Member of Parliament for Aberdeenshire; 1820–1854	Succeeded by Lord Haddo
Military offices
Preceded by Sir James Dundas	Fourth Naval Lord; 1841–1846	Succeeded by Henry Rous
Preceded by Josceline Percy	Commander-in-Chief, The Nore; 1854–1857	Succeeded by Sir Edward Harvey
