= William Dingwall Fordyce =

Scottish politician

William Dingwall Forsyth

Member of Parliament
- In office 15 May 1866 – 17 November 1868
- Preceded by: William Leslie
- Succeeded by: Constituency Abolished
- Constituency: Aberdeenshire
- In office 7 December 1868 – 27 November 1875
- Constituency: Eastern Aberdeen

Personal details
- Born: 31 March 1836
- Died: 27 November 1875 (aged 39)
- Resting place: Brucklay Castle
- Party: Scottish Liberal Party
- Spouse: Christina Horn
- Education: University of Edinburgh

William Dingwall Fordyce (31 March 1836 – 26 November 1875) was a Scottish Liberal politician. He was elected as a Member of Parliament (MP) in 1866 to represent Aberdeenshire and, following the re-organisation of constituencies by the Representation of the People (Scotland) Act 1868, on 20 November 1868 to represent Eastern Aberdeenshire.

He pioneered benefits for his tenants, such as insurance for their cottages, and sent carriages to Banff, Peterhead, and Aberdeen each week, so that they had greater mobility. He drove through gaming laws to aid the rural economy and created a railway station at Maud, which is now a part-time museum.

On his death in 1876, aged 39, the Culsh Monument was built for him by tenant subscription and designed by James Matthews. He was buried on his estate at Brucklay Castle, where an obelisk marks his grave.

== Bibliography ==
- McKean, Charles (1990), Banff & Buchan, Royal Incorporation of Architects in Scotland, ISBN 978-1-85158-231-0

Parliament of the United Kingdom
Preceded by William Leslie	Member of Parliament for Aberdeenshire; 1866 – 1868	Constituency divided
New constituency	Member of Parliament for Eastern Aberdeenshire; 1868 – 1875	Succeeded by Sir Alexander Hamilton-Gordon
