= Archibald White Maconochie =

English Liberal Unionist politician and businessman (1855 - 1926)

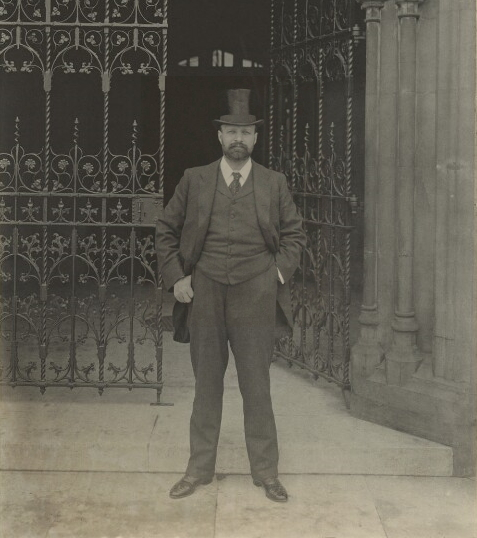
- Maconochie in 1901.

Member of Parliament for East Aberdeenshire
- In office 1 October 1900 – 12 January 1906
- Preceded by: Thomas Buchanan
- Succeeded by: James Annand

Personal details
- Born: 1855 Wigan, Lancashire
- Died: 3 February 1926 (aged 70) Wimpole House, Westminster, London
- Party: Liberal Unionist

Archibald White Maconochie (1855 – 3 February 1926) was an English Liberal Unionist politician and businessman who served as the Member of Parliament (MP) for East Aberdeenshire from 1900 to 1906. He was proprietor of the food manufacturer Maconochie Brothers.

== Background and education ==
Maconochie was born in Wigan, Lancashire in 1855. His mother, Elizabeth (née Richardson) (1819–1896), was from Stoney Stratford, Buckinghamshire, while his father, also Archibald (1815–1895), was from Edinburgh. He was the seventh of nine children, including his older brother and future business partner James (1850–1895).

== Career ==
After leaving school, Maconochie intended to join the army but instead joined his brother James's fishmongers business in Lowestoft, Suffolk, c. 1870. Three years later the two founded Maconochie Brothers, packing and selling canned herring. In 1877 the brothers opened a factory in Lowestoft, and a second factory in Fraserburgh, Aberdeenshire, followed in 1883. A London factory, based in Millwall, opened in 1897. By the mid-1880s the business had expanded to include an assortment of canned and bottled goods, including fruits, meat and soup.

In 1895 Archibald became the sole proprietor of the business, following the death of his brother James. By this time Maconochie Bros had started producing military rations, including the Maconochie, which was a vegetable stew containing potatoes, turnips and carrots in broth. The rations were frequently used during both the Second Boer War and World War I. Despite this, many soldiers detested the ration, and it was infamously described as being "man-killers" by soldiers.

The business continued to grow into the 20th century, with around 100,000 tins of food produced daily by 1900. In 1903 the popular "Pan Yan pickle" was first registered, and quickly became one of the company's staple products.

== Political career ==
In 1900, Maconochie stood for election in East Aberdeenshire, as a Liberal Unionist. Maconochie was popular in the constituency, which was home to the Maconochie Bros Fraserburgh factory, and he was elected to the seat, defeating the Liberal candidate, Thomas Buchanan, who had held the seat since 1892. Upon his election, Maconochie Bros was incorporated as a limited company, due to laws regarding MP's receiving government contracts. Maconochie served as a member of The Tariff Commission in 1904.

During his time as an MP, he was noted to take several trips to the USA, including three lengthy stays abroad while Parliament was sitting between March 1902 and March 1903. It was noted that he attended the fewest parliamentary divisions in comparison to MP's for Aberdeen's other constituencies, and the Aberdeen Peoples Journal subsequently called Maconochie's role as MP into question. Maconochie later attempted to defend himself, saying that the trips were "soley in the best interests of East Aberdeenshire".

He was subsequently defeated at the 1906 general election by the Liberal Party candidate, newspaper-editor James Annand. He made two further attempts at election, first at the general elections in January and December 1910 in the Partick division of Lanarkshire, and then again at the 1918 general election in the Wednesbury constituency in the Black Country.

== Personal life, final years and legacy ==
In September 1903, Maconochie married Jean Webb Mills (1879–1958) in Manhattan, New York. The couple had 4 children, including Archibald Benn Duntley Maconochie (1907–1962), who succeeded his father at Maconochie Bros after his death. 2 other children, Vera and Margaret (Margi), went onto become a professional singer and racing driver, respectively. His youngest daughter Jean went to RADA.

In his final years, Maconochie suffered from an enlarged prostate gland and he died at a nursing home in Wesminster in February 1926 of a heart attack following surgery for the ailment, aged 70.

In the years following his death, Maconochie Bros suffered several setbacks including the closures of several factories between the 1920s and 1950s, and export restrictions on New Zealand and Australia caused the company to collapse in 1953. The company later ended up being acquired several times, first to H. S. Whiteside in 1958, then Rowntree Makintosh in 1967. Products like the Pan Yan pickle continued to be sold under the new owners until c. 2000, including Nestlé, following its acquisition of Rowntree in 1987. The final of Maconochie's original factories closed in 2005, and the recipe for Pan Yan pickle was destroyed by fire around the same time.

Parliament of the United Kingdom
Preceded by Thomas Buchanan	Member of Parliament for East Aberdeenshire; 1900 – 1906	Succeeded by James Annand
