= Sir John Kinloch, 2nd Baronet =

British politician (1849–1910)

Sir John Kinloch

Sir John George Smyth Kinloch, 2nd Baronet (8 January 1849 – 20 May 1910) was a Scottish Liberal politician from Meigle.

Kinloch was educated at Trinity College, Cambridge. On his 29th birthday, he married Jessie Montgomerie Lumsden. They had three sons and three daughters. He succeeded as Baronet in 1881.

He was elected Member of Parliament for East Perthshire in a by-election in 1889, and re-elected in the 1892, 1895 and 1900 general elections. In early January 1903 he indicated he did not intend to seek re-election, and the following month he resigned by becoming Steward of the Manor of Northstead.

Parliament of the United Kingdom
Preceded by Robert Stewart Menzies	Member of Parliament for East Perthshire; 1889–1903	Succeeded by Thomas Buchanan
Baronetage of the United Kingdom
Preceded by George Kinloch	Baronet (of Kinloch); 1881–1910	Succeeded by George Kinloch
