= Housebreaker (business) =

A housebreaker is an organisation that specialises in the disposition of large, old residential buildings.

From the late 19th century and peaking in the mid 20th, many large country houses, manors, stately homes, and castles in the United Kingdom became impractical to maintain; initially due to the repeal of the Corn Laws and the late 19th-century agricultural depression, later because of cultural changes following the First World War and then requisitioning during the Second World War. Often, they were sold to housebreakers such as Crowthers of London or Charles Brand of Dundee for disposal of their contents and demolition.

Typically, after an initial 'walk-round sale' or auction was carried out, fixtures, fittings, and occasionally whole rooms, were sold off to museums or for re-installation in other properties. The main buildings were then un-roofed or demolished (see Destruction of country houses in 20th-century Britain).

From 1969, the destruction of houses of architectural or historical significance was prohibited by law and the job of the housebreakers ended. An estimated 1,800 buildings were disposed of by housebreakers before this time.
