= New Deer =

Coordinates: 57°30′43″N 2°11′34″W

New Deer: Scottish Gaelic: Achadh Reite
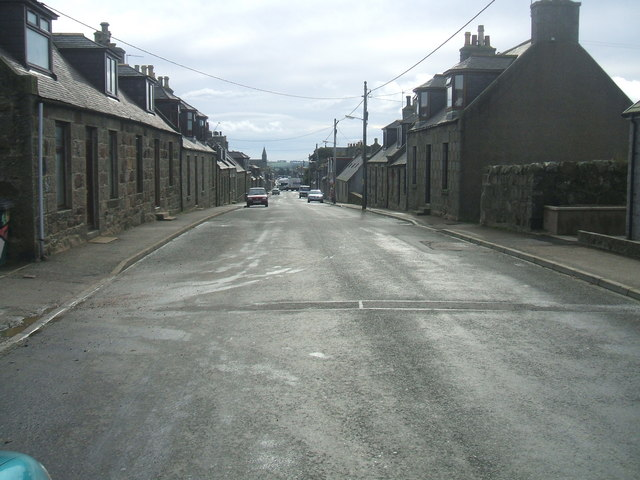
- The main street in New Deer

- Location within Aberdeenshire
- Population: 620 (2020)
- OS grid reference: NJ885468
- Council area: Aberdeenshire
- Lieutenancy area: Aberdeenshire
- Country: Scotland
- Sovereign state: United Kingdom
- Post town: TURRIFF
- Postcode district: AB53
- Police: Scotland
- Fire: Scottish
- Ambulance: Scottish
- UK Parliament: Gordon and Buchan
- Scottish Parliament: Aberdeenshire East

New Deer (Scottish Gaelic: Achadh Reite) is a settlement in Aberdeenshire, North East Scotland, which lies in the valley of Deer. It is located at the junction of several roads crossing through the Howe of Buchan. It was founded after monks from Deer Abbey, Old Deer, built a chapel at Auchreddie, which translates as "field of the bog myrtle", and lies clustered on both sides of the slope of a tributary of South Ugie Water. Around 1507 the register of Deer Abbey lists its lands in the "new paroche of Deir". The name Auchreddie has dropped in significance over the years; however, the southern end of the village is still known by this name.

In 1805, New Deer was extended to the north by the third James Ferguson of Pitfour (1735–1820), the elder brother of Patrick Ferguson. Also involved were the Gordons of Cairnbanno, who were seeking to improve the old community of Auchreddie.

== Attractions ==
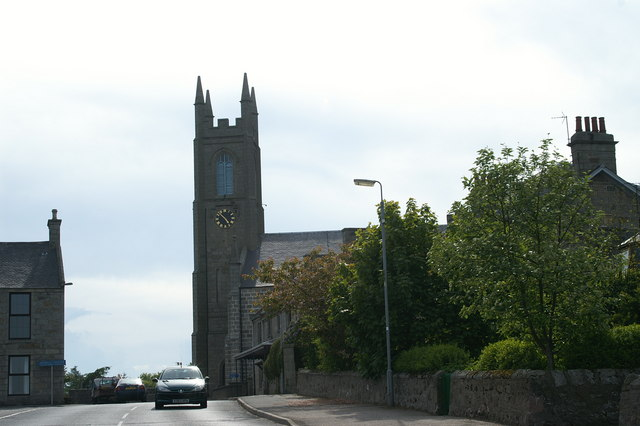
St Kane's Church, New Deer

=== Churches ===
There are three churches in the village, only one of which (St Kane's) still functions as a religious establishment; it belongs to the Church of Scotland. The former St Kane's Church was built in 1622. Virtually nothing of it survives, except for a stone built into the wall of the Session House. Only the offices and the 1828 sundial survive of the manse. Their website has updates on activities, including a link to Malawi. One is now used as a gym hall of the primary school and the other has been built into flats. In 2014, Mintlaw Community Church, as part of an outreach to the community, started to hold a weekly Sunday Morning Service in former church building in Main Street.

St Kane's opened a church centre in 2003, next door to the church. The building was previously a long-running local general store and accompanying house. The centre includes a café and is used for various community activities.

New Deer (St Kane's) Primary School sits behind the main church, in the centre of the village.

The former New Parish Church dates to around 1840, designed by John Smith.

Savoch of Deer Kirk dates to 1834, possibly another work of Smith. The nearby Presbyterian Church, 1828, was designed by James Balfour.

=== Public Hall ===
The public hall, opposite the church centre, is run on a not-for-profit basis and hosts various activities including parent-and-baby groups and exercise classes, as well as being a venue for theatrical productions.

=== Culsh Monument ===
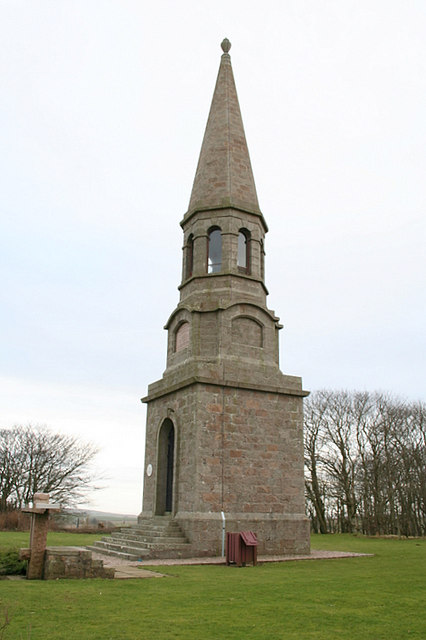
The Culsh Monument

Stands on a hill to the north of the village and commemorates William Dingwall Fordyce. Local Brucklay estate landlord, Fordyce was an Aberdeenshire MP. Constructed in 1877, the monument is 80 feet (24 m) high and was designed by James Matthews. Situated at the highest point in New Deer, 150 m (490 ft) above sea level, it is prominent on the skyline on all major approaches to the town. Historic Scotland designated it as a Category B listed building in April 1971.

=== Fedderate Castle ===
The ruins of Fedderate Castle are to be found 3 kilometres (1.9 mi) north of the village.

Mains of Fedderate, near the castle, is a large farmhouse dating to around 1825.

=== Pubs ===
New Deer is currently host to three public houses, the Brucklay Arms on Main Street, the Howe (Earl of Aberdeen Arms), situated on Auchreddie Road East and the Royal British Legion, opposite St Kane's Church.

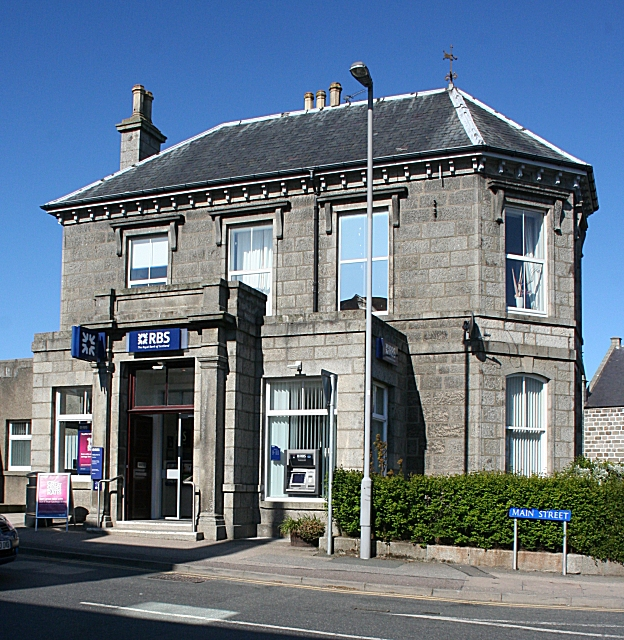
The Royal Bank of Scotland in 2009

=== Banks ===
There has been a bank in the village since at least 1847. For many years this was the Clydesdale Bank until 2006 when the Royal Bank of Scotland took over the branch. The RBS branch remains open, open three days a week. Historically the New Deer Savings Bank (est. 1847, and which became part of Trustee Savings Bank (TSB) in 1863), also provided a service to residents, but TSB left the village in the 1980s. The villagers' successful campaign against the removal of banking facilities was partly responsible for it winning the "Calor Gas Scottish Community of the Year" award in 2006.

=== Amenities ===
The Grampian Wildlife Rehabilitation Trust provides help to various wildlife including seals.

After local consultations and fundraising spanning 10 years, during April 2013 construction began on New Deer All Weather Facility at the village's play park. The first stage was building a storeroom and changing rooms.

Other amenities in the village include builders, butchers, seasonal café, pharmacy, general grocery store, hairdressers, photographer, post office, delicatessen and vets.

== Events ==
The New Deer Show is an agricultural show that has been running for over 150 years.

Other annual village events include a gala and a barn dance.

== Local notables ==
- William Dingwall Fordyce (1836–1875), MP
- Bertie Charles Forbes (1880–1954), was born and buried in New Deer.
- William Leslie of Nethermuir (1802-1879) Lord Provost of Aberdeen
- Alexander Falconer Murison (1847–1934), professor and journalist.
- William Fordyce Mavor (1758–1837), educationalist, was born in New Deer.
- J. Murdoch Henderson (1902-1970), fiddler and composer, born in New Deer.

In the early 19th century a local miller named John Fraser had a reputation of being in league with the Devil, who was said to operate the mill for him. As of 1990, a mid-19th-century mill was still in existence, with its kiln and 16-foot overshot wheel.

== Bibliography ==
- McKean, Charles (1990), Banff & Buchan, Royal Incorporation of Architects in Scotland, ISBN 978-1-85158-231-0
