= Ainslie (name) =

Ainslie is a surname and given name, as well as a variant of Ainsley. People with the name include:

== Notable people ==
=== Surname ===
- Ben Ainslie (born 1977), English competitive sailor
- Brodie Ainslie (1891–1944), Australian rules footballer
- Charles Nicholas Ainslie (1856–1939), American entomologist
- Charlotte Ainslie (1863–1960), Scottish educationalist and headmistress
- Donald C. Ainslie, American philosopher
- Douglas Ainslie (1865–1948), Scottish poet, translator, critic and diploma
- George Ainslie (disambiguation), multiple people, including:
  - George Robert Ainslie (1776–1839), Scottish general and coin collector
  - George Ainslie (British Army officer, died 1804), Scottish general
  - George Ainslie (Idaho politician) (1838–1913), Congressional delegate from Idaho
  - George Ainslie (psychologist) (born 1944), American psychiatrist, psychologist and behavioral economist
  - George Ainslie (Virginia politician) (1868–1931), mayor of Richmond, Virginia
- Gilbert Ainslie (1793–1870), English academic and clergyman
- Henry Ainslie (1760–1834), English physician
- Hew Ainslie (1792–1878), Scottish poet
- Ian Ainslie (born 1967), South African Olympic sailor
- Jack Ainslie (1921–2007), English politician
- James Ainslie (disambiguation), multiple people, including:
  - James Ainslie (cricketer) (1880–1953), Australian cricketer
  - James Ainslie (pastoralist) (1787–1844), Scottish pastoralist, after whom some areas near Canberra are named
- John Ainslie (1745–1828), Scottish surveyor and cartographer
- Lee Ainslie (born 1964), American hedge fund manager
- Montague Ainslie (1792–1884), English businessman
- Montague Ainslie (cricketer) (1823–1896), English cricketer
- Paul Ainslie (born 1967), city councillor in Toronto, Canada
- Robert Ainslie (disambiguation), multiple people, including:
  - Robert Ainslie (rugby union) (1858–1906), Scottish rugby union football player
  - Sir Robert Ainslie, 1st Baronet (1730–1812), Scottish ambassador, orientalist and numismatist
  - Robert Ainslie (writer) (1766–1838), Scottish writer and correspondent of Robert Burns
- Thomas Ainslie (rugby union) (1860–1926), Scottish rugby football player
- William George Ainslie (1832–1893), English politician
- Sir Whitelaw Ainslie (1767–1837), British surgeon and writer

=== Given name ===
- Ainslie Caterer (1858–1924), Australian cricketer, cricket administrator and educator
- Ainslie Embree (1921–2017), American Indologist and historian
- Ainslie Henderson (born 1979), Scottish singer-songwriter
- Ainslie Kemp (born 1997), Australian rules footballer
- Ainslie Meares (1910–1986), Australian psychiatrist
- Ainslie Roberts (1911–1993), Australian painter, photographer, and commercial artist
- Ainslie Sheil (born 1933), Australian rugby union player

== See also ==
- Ainslie (disambiguation)
- Ainslee (disambiguation)
- Ainslie baronets
