= Annesley (disambiguation) =

Annesley may refer to:

== Places ==
- Annesley, a village in Nottinghamshire, England
  - Annesley railway station, its station
- Annesley Hall, Nottinghamshire, England
- Annesley Woodhouse, Nottinghamshire, England
- Annesley College, an independent girls' school in Adelaide, South Australia
- Annesley Junior School
- Annesley Hall, University of Toronto

== People ==
- Annesley, the family name of the Viscount Valentia
- Earl Annesley, a noble title
- Arthur Annesley (disambiguation)
- Clare Annesley (1893-1980), British activist
- Francis Annesley (disambiguation)
- James Annesley (disambiguation)
- Louie Annesley, British footballer
- Richard Annesley (disambiguation)
- William Annesley (disambiguation)
- Annesley Malewana, Sri Lankan vocalist

== See also ==
- Ainslie (disambiguation)
- Ainslee (disambiguation)
- Ansley (disambiguation)
- Aynsley
