= Ainsley =

- Pronunciation: /ˈeɪnzli/
- Gender: Unisex (mainly female)

Origin
- Origin: Scotland

Other names
- Related names: Ainslie, Ainsleigh, Ainslee, Aynsley

Ainsley (also spelt Ainsleigh) is both a unisex given name and a surname and place name. It is derived from words meaning hermitage and clearing (Old English "anne" ("alone, solitary") or ānsetl ("hermitage") + lēah ("woodland, clearing")).

Notable people with the name include:

== Given name ==
- A. C. de Zoysa (1923–1983), Sri Lankan criminal lawyer
- Ainsley Battles (born 1978), American football player
- Ainsley Bennett (born 1954), British sprinter
- Ainsley Earhardt (born 1978), American television news anchor
- Ainsley Gardiner, film producer from New Zealand
- Ainsley Gotto (1946–2018), Australian businesswoman
- Ainsley Hall (born 1972), Cayman Islands cricketer
- Ainsley Hamill, Scottish singer
- Ainsley Harriott (born 1957), English television chef
- Ainsley Howard, English actress
- Ainsley Iggo (1924–2012), Scottish neurophysiologist
- Ainsley Maitland-Niles (born 1997), English footballer
- Ainsley Melham (born 1991), Australian actor
- Ainsley Robinson, Canadian wrestler
- Ainsley Waugh (born 1981), Jamaican sprinter

== Surname ==
=== Ainsleigh ===
- Daniel Ainsleigh (born 1976), English actor and acting coach

=== Ainsley ===
- George Ainsley (1915–1985), English footballer and manager
- Jack Ainsley (born 1990), English footballer
- Jacqui Ainsley (born 1981), English model
- John Mark Ainsley (born 1963), English opera singer
- William Ainsley (1898–1976), English coal miner and politician

== See also ==
- Ainley, a surname
- Ainsley Canal, a short canal in Chennai, Tamil Nadu, India
- Ainsley House, a building in Campbell, California, United States
- Ainslie (disambiguation)
- Ansley, a parish in Warwickshire, England
- Aynsley China, a British manufacturer
- Aynsley, a given name and surname
