= Ainslie =

Ainslie may refer to:

== People ==
- Ainslie baronets
- Ainslie (name)

== Places ==
- Ainslie, Australian Capital Territory, a suburb of Canberra, Australia
- Ainslie Wood (disambiguation), multiple places
- Lake Ainslie, largest natural freshwater lake in Nova Scotia, Canada
- Mount Ainslie, a hill in the suburbs of Canberra

== Other uses ==
- Ainslie Football Club, semi-professional Australian rules football club based in Canberra
- Harrison Ainslie, former firm of ironmasters and iron ore merchants
- Ainslie Tavern Bond, Scottish document signed on about 20 April 1567

== See also ==
- Ainslee (disambiguation)
- Ansley
- Annesley (disambiguation)
- Aynsley
