= Charles Philip de Ainslie =

British Army general

General Charles Philip de Ainslie
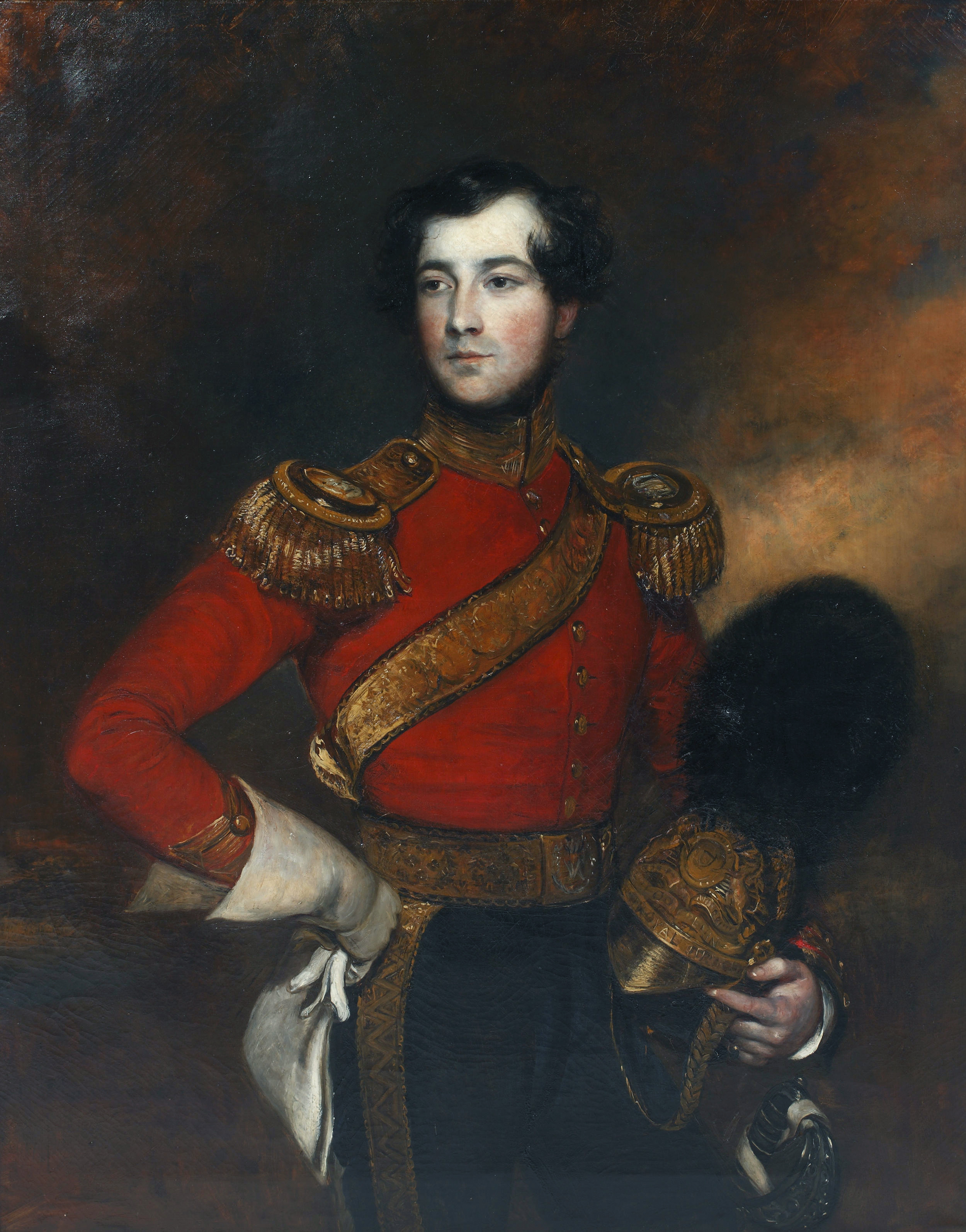
- Portrait by Frederick Yeates Hurlstone
- Born: 18 March 1808; Newcastle upon Tyne, England
- Died: 23 March 1889 (aged 81); London, England
- Military career
- Allegiance: United Kingdom
- Branch: British Army
- Rank: General
- Unit: 1st Dragoons

General Charles Philip de Ainslie (18 March 1808 – 23 March 1889) was a British Army officer.

== Early life and education ==
Ainslie was son of Colonel Charles Philip Ainslie, of the 4th Dragoons, and Mary Ann, daughter of James Atkinson, of Newcastle upon Tyne. His paternal grandfather was the landowner Colonel Sir Philip Ainslie of Pilton, whose wife Elizabeth was daughter of John Gray, 11th Lord Gray. His uncle George Robert Ainslie was a soldier and colonial governor. The Ainslie family were Scottish gentry, senior representatives of the ancient chiefly family of that name of Dolphinton, Lanarkshire, and held a baronetcy. They had considerable mercantile interests. Ainslie was educated at Charterhouse School.

== Military career ==
Ainslie was commissioned as a second lieutenant in the Rifle Brigade on 10 April 1825. He transferred to the 4th Regiment of Light Dragoons on promotion to lieutenant on 29 January 1826. He was promoted to captain on 16 March 1830 and transferred to the 1st Regiment of Dragoons on 29 June 1830.

Promoted to major on 14 October 1842, Ainslie transferred to the 14th Regiment of Light Dragoons on 3 February 1943. Promoted to lieutenant colonel on 22 October 1847, he was given command of the 7th Dragoon Guards on 23 February 1849 before being promoted to full colonel on 2 November 1854.

Ainslie was promoted to major general on 7 July 1862, to lieutenant general on 25 October 1871 and to full general on 1 October 1877. He changed his name from Ainslie to de Ainslie by deed poll in 1879. He served as colonel of the 1st Royal Dragoons from 1869 until his death in 1889.

== Personal life ==
In 1834, Ainslie married firstly his cousin Jane Anne, daughter of the politician Francis Gray, 14th Lord Gray (his grandmother's brother); he married secondly, in 1843, Lady Sarah Eliza, daughter of Thomas Lyon-Bowes, 11th Earl of Strathmore and Kinghorne. He had no children from either marriage.

Military offices
Preceded by Sir Arthur Clifton	Colonel of the 1st (Royal) Regiment of Dragoons; 1869–1889	Succeeded by John Yorke
