= Charles Ainslie =

Charles Ainslie may refer to:

- Charles Nicholas Ainslie (1856–1929), American entomologist
- Charles Philip de Ainslie (1808–1889), British Army officer
- Ben Ainslie (Sir Charles Benedict Ainslie, born 1977), English competitive sailor
