= Ainley =

Ainley is a surname. Notable people with the surname include:

- Alex Ainley (born 1981), New Zealand rugby union player
- Anthony Ainley (1932–2004), English actor
- Callum Ainley (born 1997), English footballer
- Henry Ainley (1879–1945), English Shakespearean stage and screen actor
- Joe Ainley (1878–1907), English cricketer
- John Ainley (1906–1992), British colonial judge
- John A. Ainley Jr. (1938–2001), American politician
- Richard Ainley (1910–1967), stage and film actor
- Ted Ainley (1903–1968), British trade union leader and communist activist

== See also ==
- Ainley Peak
- Ainley Top
- Ainlay, surname
- Ainsley, surname
