= Aynsley =

Aynsley is both a given name and a surname. Notable people with the name include:

- Aynsley Dunbar (born 1946), English drummer;
- Aynsley Lister (born 1976), English blues-rock guitarist/singer and songwriter;
- Cecil Aynsley (1902–1975), 20th-century Australian rugby league footballer;
- Eugene Aynsley Goossens (1893–1962), English conductor and composer;
- John Aynsley (1823–1907), English potter.

== See also ==
- Lord Charles Murray-Aynsley, English dean
- Hugh Murray-Aynsley, 19th-century Member of Parliament in Canterbury, New Zealand
- Ainslie
- Ainslee
- Ansley
- Annesley (disambiguation)
