= General Yorke =

General Yorke may refer to:

- Charles Yorke (British Army officer) (1790–1880), British Army general
- John Yorke (British Army officer) (1814–1890), British Army general
- Joseph Yorke, 1st Baron Dover (1724–1792), British Army general

== See also ==
- Zebulon York (1819–1900), Confederate States Army brigadier general
