= Robert Ainslie =

Robert Ainslie may refer to:

- Robert Ainslie (rugby union) (fl. 1879–1882), Scottish rugby union football player
- Sir Robert Ainslie, 1st Baronet (1730–1812), British ambassador to the Ottoman Empire, orientalist and numismatist
- Robert Ainslie (lawyer) (1766–1838), Scottish lawyer, writer and correspondent of Robert Burns
- Sir Robert Ainslie, 2nd Baronet of the Ainslie baronets (1777–1858)
