= George Ainslie =

George Ainslie may refer to:

- George Ainslie (British Army officer, died 1804), Scottish general
- George Robert Ainslie (1776–1839), Scottish general and coin collector
- George Ainslie (Idaho politician) (1838–1913), congressional delegate from Idaho
- George Ainslie (psychologist) (born 1944) American psychiatrist, psychologist and behavioral economist
- George Ainslie (Virginia politician) (1868–1931), mayor of Richmond, Virginia, 1912–1924
