= Elsham Hall =

17th-century English country house

Coordinates: 53.5933°N 0.4437°W

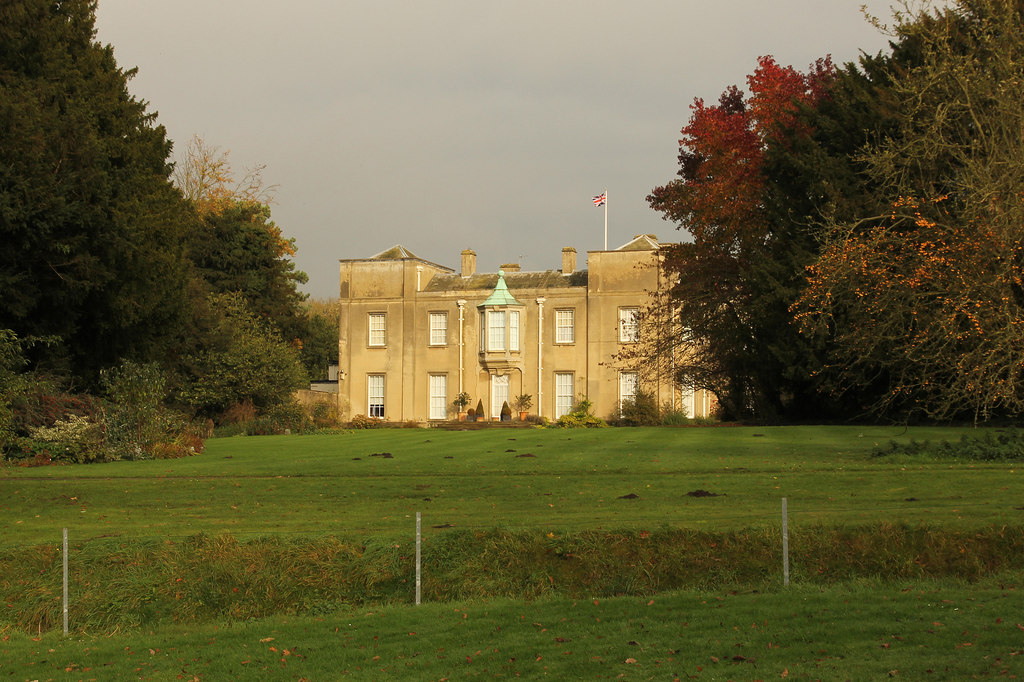
Elsham Hall

Elsham Hall is a 17th-century English country house situated in its own parkland in Elsham, North Lincolnshire. The park and gardens are open to the public.

== The house ==
The present house dates back to the 1760s, on the site of an earlier dwelling of which little is known. It is of brick construction, limestone ashlar on the main aspect and rendered elsewhere, and with a Westmoreland slate roof. The house was extended for the then owner, T. G. Corbett, in the 19th century, although most of the 19th-century service wing was demolished in the 20th. There were further enhancements by the Elwes family in 1933. The house is a Grade II* listed building.

The house includes a Catholic chapel dating from 1933, and an 18th-century stone staircase.

Separate from the house, on its own alignment, is a fine 19th-century orangery, which is a grade II listed building in its own right.

The house is not open to the public. It was inherited by Gervase Elwes and Robert Elwes from their father Captain Jeremy Elwes in 1999 and placed in an Elwes 1989 Children's Trust for their heirs in perpetuity. The Gardens and Park is open in summer to visitors since 1970. Gervase Elwes lives at the Hall on the Elsham Estate. Robert Elwes lives at Sawcliffe Manor on the nearby Elwes Roxby Estate.

== History ==
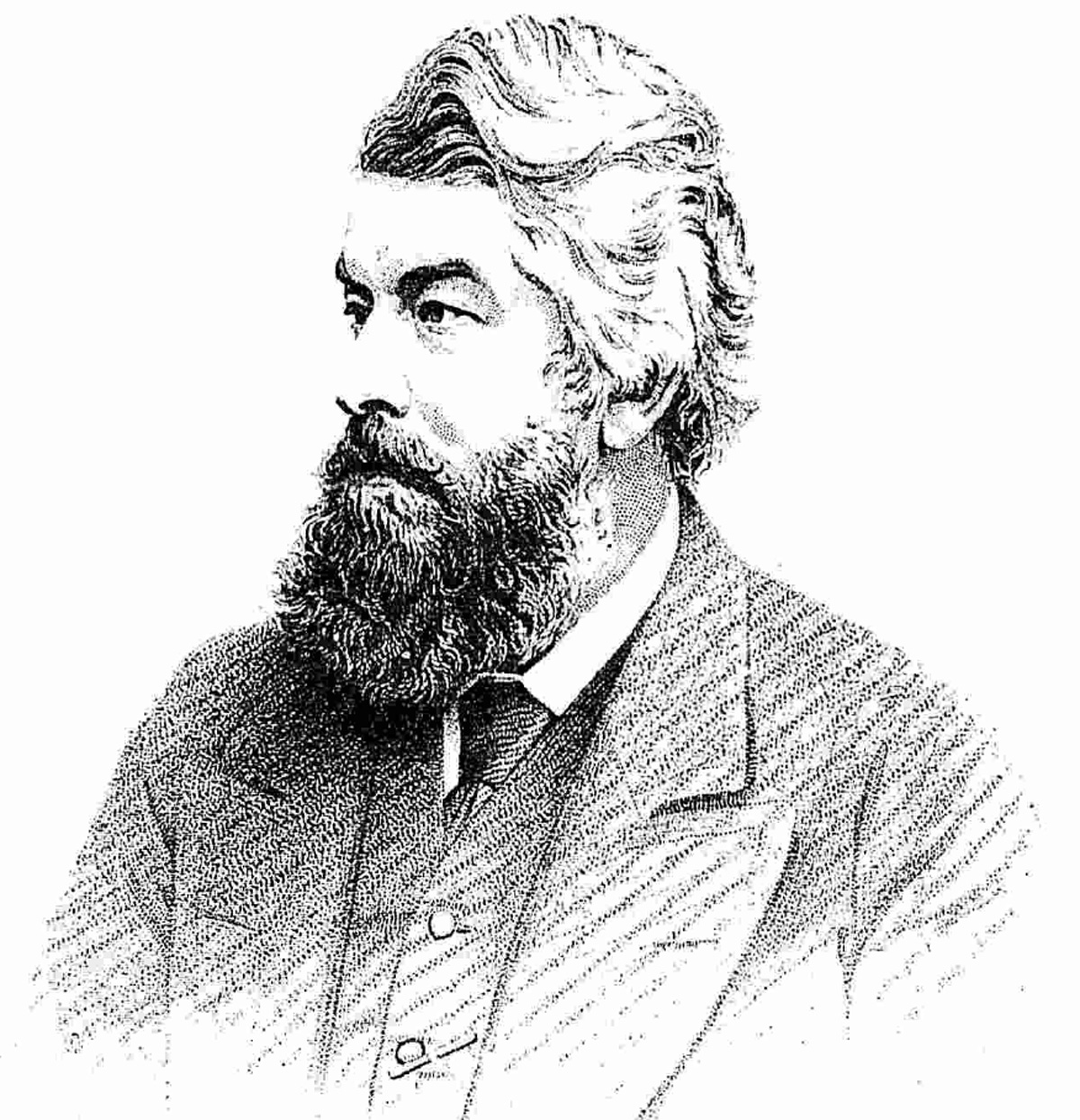
Sir John Dugdale Astley

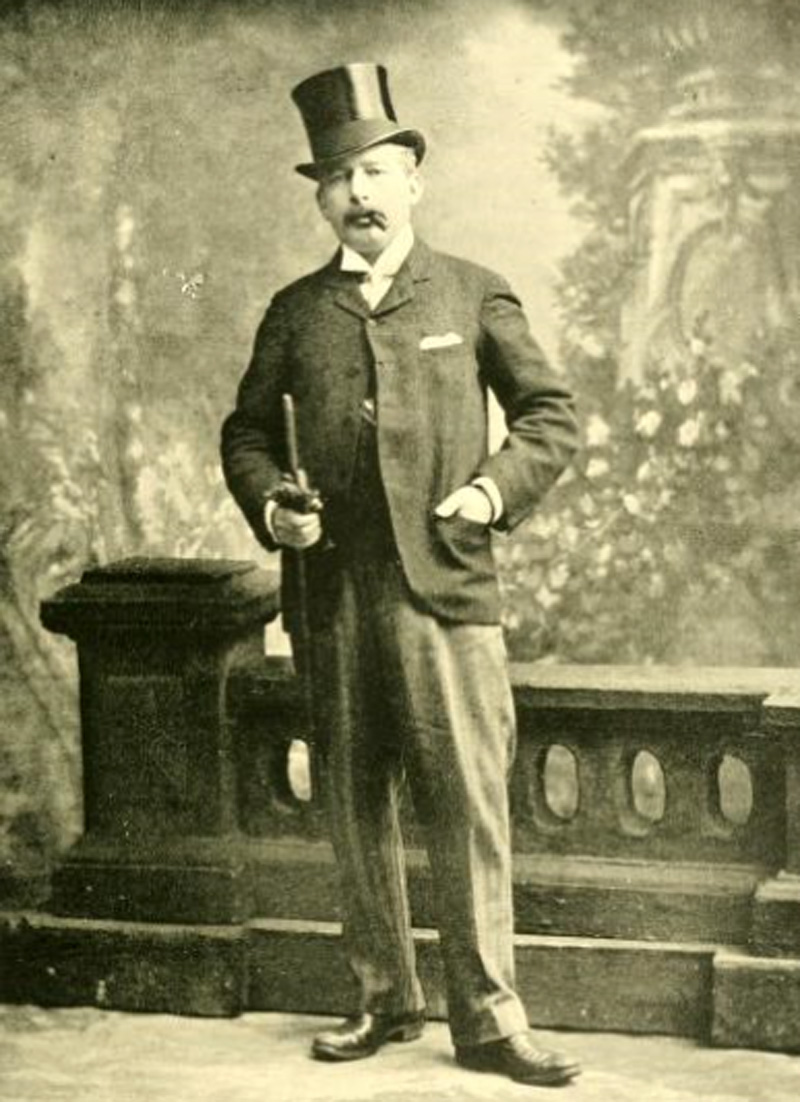
Sir Francis Edmund George Astley-Corbett

The origins of Elsham Hall date from the 17th century or even earlier but in about 1760 major additions were made to the building. At this time the property was owned by William Thompson and his wife Elizabeth (née Gore). He died in 1764 and his son Robert Thompson inherited the estate, so it is possible that it was he who made the additions. He died in 1788 and as he had no children he left the house to his niece Elizabeth Corbett. She was the daughter of Humphrey Edwin and Mary Thompson. She was born in 1739 and in 1755 married Thomas Corbett (1730–1808), of Darnhall Hall in Cheshire. When she inherited Elsham Hall, she brought the property to the Corbett family.

From 1800 to 1814 the house was occupied by Jane Gardiner, who ran a girls' boarding school there.

When Thomas Corbett died, their eldest son inherited the estate and also took the additional name of Thompson, becoming William Thompson Corbett (1759–1832). In 1794 he had married Jane Eleanor Ainslie, the daughter of General George Ainslie. They had twelve children; their eldest son, Thomas George Corbett, inherited the property. He married in 1837 Lady Mary Noel Beauclerk, daughter of the 8th Duke of St Albans and his wife Maria nee Nelthorpe. They had one daughter, Eleanor Blanche Mary Corbett, and she married in 1858 Sir John Dugdale Astley, 3rd Baronet. She inherited Elsham Hall in 1868 and so brought the house to the Astley family. Their eldest son also took the additional name of Corbett and so became Sir Francis Edmund George Astley-Corbett, 4th Baronet. He inherited the property on the death of his father in 1894.

In 1925 Sir Francis sold the Elsham estate to King's College, Cambridge as an investment. They sold the house in 1931 to the Elwes family, who still own the property. Captain Jeremy Elwes inherited the property from his Uncle Geoffrey Elwes after the Second World War and restored it with his wife Clare Elwes after occupation as the Antiaircraft HQ. It was then passed to Robert and Gervase Elwes, who have turned it into a very successful tourism and wedding venue. Their two families have restored and developed the venue for future generations as a historic gardens open to visitors under the guidance of the Historic Houses Association. See below.

When Captain Jeremy Elwes died in 1999, his sons Gervase and Robert Elwes inherited the main farms and estate in his 2002 Will Trust, but a separated 1989 Elwes Trust took on Elsham Hall and its gardens. There were also a number of museums and arts charities founded by Capt Elwes, including the Lincolnshire Life Museum, various working windmills, including Wrawby Post Mill, and the St Hugh's Foundation that assists artists to travel overseas in Lincoln. Robert Elwes continued on the Yorkshire Tourist Board, Lincolnshire Tourism, Yorkshire Museums Council. Historic Houses Association, and various arts and tourism committees, winning several national awards. Gervase Elwes is a full-time portrait painter following in the tradition of Sir Simon Elwes, who painted HM the Queen. They have two brothers, Hugh Elwes (banker) and Giles Elwes (TV producer), who live and work in the South of England. Elsham Estate is approximately 1000 hectares of mainly woodland and pasture land with a famous Lambing Sunday. It has a barn theatre restaurant built by Robert Elwes in 1989 that hosts classical music, mediaeval banquets and weddings. Elsham Hall Gardens are open to visitors (see Elsham Hall website) with a carp lake, adventure playground and children's animal farm, and fantasy walled garden.

== The park and gardens ==
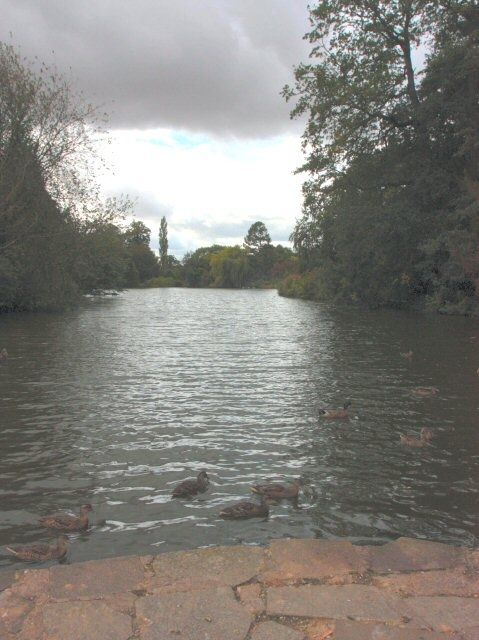
The carp lake

The gardens include a large medieval carp lake, and a 19th-century coach house and stables, which is a Grade II listed building.

The park and gardens were opened as a country park in 1970 by Captain and Mrs. Elwes "to promote enjoyment of the countryside and wildlife and an appreciation of the arts and rural crafts".

It is a local point of interest and a destination for school field trips, particularly during the spring lambing season. A list of facilities include:

- Carp lake, with a feeding platform
- Walled and lakeside gardens, sensory gardens, arboretum and wild butterfly walkway
- An adventure playground
- Aviaries
- Farm animal display and feeding
- Craft centres, in particular a working blacksmith
- The stables also include a shop and the courtyard cafe
- The barn theatre – used for indoor & outdoor performances, weddings, medieval banquets and conferences

The centre is a registered venue for civil weddings.
