= Sir William James Myers, 2nd Baronet =

Sir William James Myers, 2nd Baronet (27 November 1783 – 17 May 1811) was the only son of Lieutenant-General Sir William Myers, 1st Baronet.

== Life ==
He was born in Dublin and educated at Winchester College.

He may have joined his father's regiment, 15th Foot, in 1794, and became a Captain on 18 December 1794 and was a full pay Captain unattached 11 March 1795.

In 1800, from half-pay, he joined the Coldstream Guards, becoming Captain-Lieutenant on 11 January 1800 during the expedition to Egypt, arriving after the capture of Alexandria. In 1801, his regiment returned to the U.K., and was posted to the Southern District of Ireland. In 1802, he went on the half-pay of the 62nd Foot as Lieutenant-Colonel, and attended the Royal Military College, High Wycombe. On 15 August 1804, he exchanged into the 7th Foot as the junior Lieutenant-Colonel, but in the autumn was appointed to command the 2nd Battalion, 7th Foot (later named the Royal Fusiliers), which was posted to Ireland a few years later, before being despatched to Portugal in 1809.

He commanded 2/7th Foot in the Peninsula, April to July 1809. He was appointed to command the Fusilier Brigade, comprising the 7th and 23rd regiments in 4th Division, July 1809 to January 1810. The Brigade served without particular distinction at the Battle of Talavera in July 1809. He then commanded 1/7th Foot from November 1810 to February 1811.

At the Battle of Albuera, he was mortally wounded and died at Valverde on the following day.

He succeeded his father as 2nd Baronet on 29 July 1805. The Baronetcy became extinct at his death. A monument to him was erected in St. Paul's Cathedral, London. The monument was sculpted by Josephus Pinnix Kendrick.

== Bibliography ==
- “The Life of Sir William Myers.” 1811. Royal Military Chronicle, October: 469-474.
- “Myers”. 1844. In: A Genealogical and Heraldic History of the Extinct and Dormant Baronetcies in England, Ireland and Scotland, compiled by J. Burke and J.B. Burke, 2nd edition: 351-2. London, UK: John Russell Smith.
- The Napoleon Series [Web site]: The entry for 7th Foot provide an outline of some of Sir William's career, and is supplemented by a note in the Forum, both drawn from the regimental Muster rolls in The National Archives and The Army Lists.

Baronetage of the United Kingdom
Preceded by William Myers	Baronet; 1805–1811	Extinct
