= Francis Russell (MP for Cheltenham) =

British soldier and politician

Francis Russell CMG
- Born: 13 December 1840
- Died: 18 March 1912 (aged 71)
- Education: Radley College; Balliol College, Oxford
- Military career
- Allegiance: United Kingdom
- Branch: British Army
- Service years: 1863–1898
- Rank: Major-general
- Unit: 14th (King's) Hussars
- Commands: 1st (Royal) Dragoons; Aberdeen Volunteer Brigade
- Conflicts: Third Anglo-Ashanti War; Anglo-Zulu War; Battle of Ulundi; First Boer War

Member of Parliament for Cheltenham
- In office 1895–1900

Major-General Francis Shirley Russell CMG (13 December 1840 – 18 March 1912) was a British soldier and politician.

Born into a prominent Aberdeenshire family, Russell was educated at Radley College, and then at Balliol College, Oxford, from which he graduated in 1862. He then joined the 14th Hussars as cornet on 6 February 1863, was promoted to lieutenant on 23 August 1864, and to captain on 13 June 1868. From 1869 to 1870 he served as an aide-de-camp in Ireland, and from 1873 to 1874 in the Ashanti Campaign.

In 1875, Russell joined the staff of the Royal Military College, as an inspector in tactics, then in 1878 he moved to the Intelligence Branch. In 1879, he served in the Zulu War, then in 1880/81 in the First Boer War. In 1885, he was promoted to colonel. From 1889, he was a military attaché in Berlin, and in 1891 he was made a Commander of the Order of St Michael and St George (CMG). In 1892, he was made brigadier-general of the Aberdeen Defence Brigade, and in 1897 he was promoted to the rank of major-general. He was appointed Colonel of the 1st Royal Dragoons on 9 June 1890, serving as such until 1912.

Russell received the 1st class of the Prussian Order of the Crown in late 1902, following an inspection of the Royal Dragoons by Emperor Wilhelm II, who was colonel-in-chief of the regiment.

He stood unsuccessfully for the Conservative Party in East Aberdeenshire at the 1892 UK general election, and again at a by-election in December. He was elected in Cheltenham at the 1895 UK general election, serving until his retirement in 1900.

Russell was the maternal grandfather of William Whitelaw, 1st Viscount Whitelaw.

Parliament of the United Kingdom
Preceded by James Agg-Gardner	Member of Parliament for Cheltenham; 1895–1900	Succeeded by James Agg-Gardner
Honorary titles
Preceded by Sir Frederick Marshall	Colonel of the 1st (Royal) Dragoons; 1900–1912	Succeeded by John Lindley
