= John Lindley (British Army officer) =

British Army officer

Major-General The Honourable John Lindley JP
- Born: 15 September 1860
- Died: 7 April 1925 (aged 64)
- Military career
- Allegiance: United Kingdom
- Branch: British Army
- Service years: 1881–1917
- Rank: Major-General
- Commands: Cavalry School; 3rd Cavalry Brigade; Welsh Division
- Conflicts: Second Boer War; First World War

Major-General John Edward Lindley JP (15 September 1860 – 7 April 1925) was a British Army officer.

== Military career ==
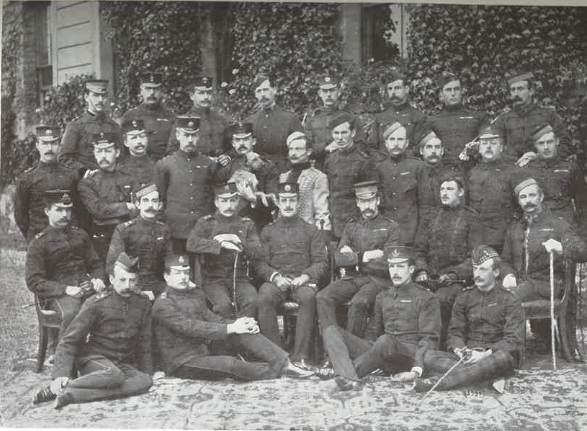
The Staff College, Camberley, class in 1890. Stood in the back row, fourth from the left, is John Lindley.

John Edward Lindley was born on 15 September 1860, the son of Nathaniel Lindley, Baron Lindley and Sarah Katherine Teale.

Lindley, after graduating from the Royal Military College, Sandhurst, was commissioned as a lieutenant into the South Staffordshire Regiment in October 1881 but transferred to the 1st The Royal Dragoons on 19 November 1881.

He attended the Staff College, Camberley from 1890 to 1891. On 31 August 1893 he was appointed as a deputy assistant adjutant general (DAAG). On 3 April 1897 he was promoted to major on augmentation. In June 1899 he again became a DAAG.

He served in the Second Boer War, which began in October 1899, and was promoted to lieutenant colonel and made a deputy assistant quartermaster general at the War Office in London.

He was made commandant of the School of Instruction for Imperial Yeomanry in September 1901. He was promoted to colonel and served as an assistant adjutant general with North-Eastern District in November 1903. He then became adjutant general at Northern Command later in 1903, and commandant of the Cavalry School in May 1905, where he took over from Brevet Colonel The Hon. Julian Byng. He then succeeded Colonel Michael Rimington as general officer commanding (GOC) of the 3rd Cavalry Brigade, for which he was promoted to the temporary rank of brigadier general whilst holding this appointment, on 26 January 1907.

Still in command of the brigade, he was promoted to major general in October 1910. He was made colonel of the 1st (Royal) Dragoons in March 1912, taking over from Major General Francis Russell, who had died. He went on to become GOC of the Welsh Division, later the 53rd (Welsh) Division, on 14 October 1914, taking over from Major General Francis Lloyd.

He landed with his division, now the 53rd (Welsh) Division, at Suvla Bay on 6 August 1915 during the Gallipoli campaign, in which action his division suffered significant losses: he voluntarily handed over his command, saying that he had "lost control", on 16 August. He was appointed a base commandant on 19 August, leaving that post on 3 October the same year. He retired on 25 March 1917 citing "ill-health contracted on active service", and then on 16 April 1919 resigned as colonel of the 1st Dragoons.

Military offices
Preceded by Francis Lloyd	GOC Welsh Division; 1914–1915	Succeeded by William Marshall
