= Arthur Clifton =

British Army general

General Sir Arthur Clifton GCB KCH
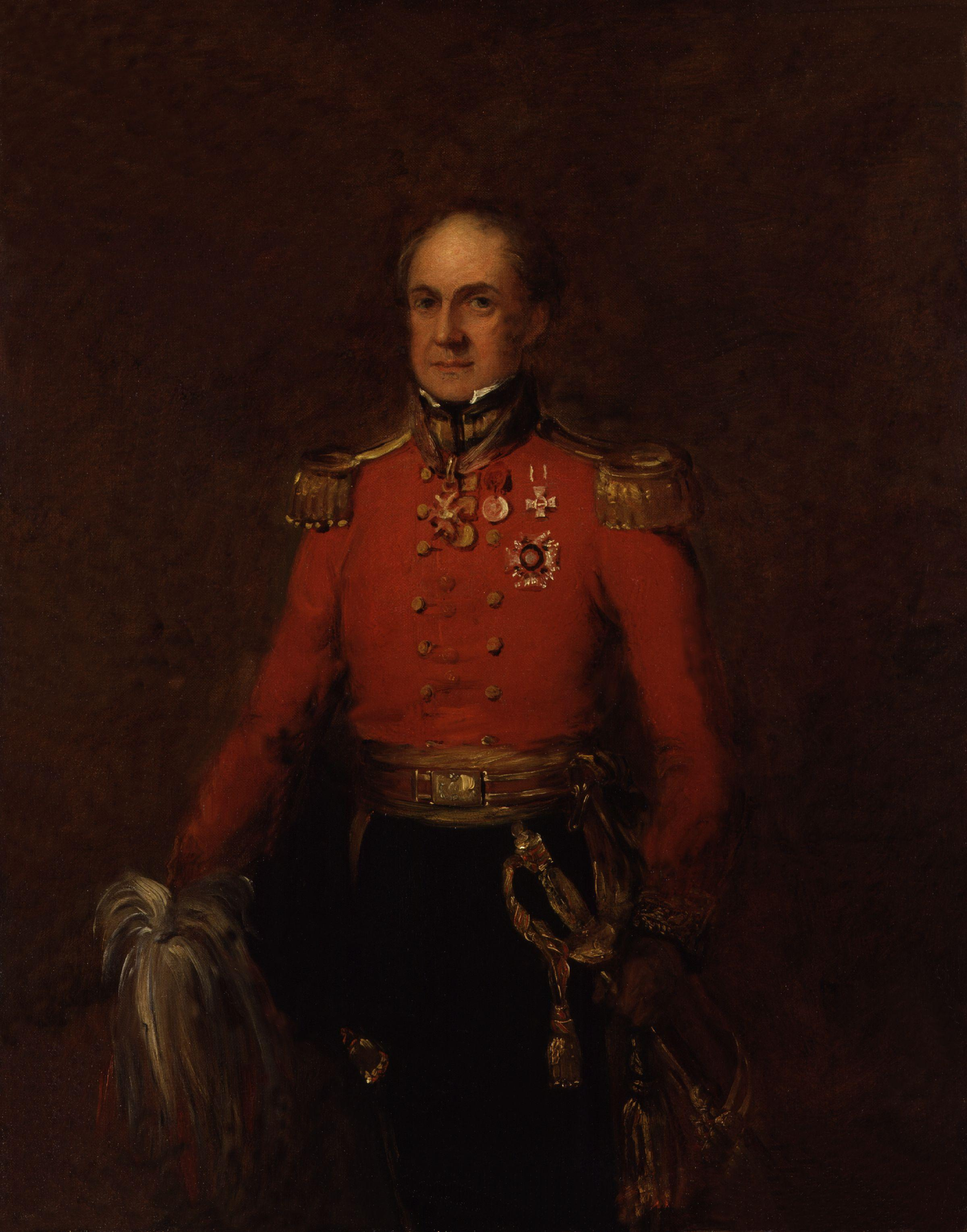
- Portrait by William Salter
- Born: 1771
- Died: 8 March 1869 (aged 97–98)
- Military career
- Allegiance: United Kingdom
- Branch: British Army
- Rank: General
- Unit: 1st Dragoons
- Conflicts: Napoleonic Wars
- Awards: Grand Cross of the Order of the Bath; Knight Commander of the Royal Guelphic Order

General Sir Arthur Benjamin Clifton GCB KCH (1771 – 8 March 1869) was a British Army officer who fought in the Peninsular War and commanded the Second Union Cavalry Brigade at the Battle of Waterloo on 18 June 1815.

== Biography ==
Clifton was the third son of Sir Gervase Clifton, 6th Baronet, (1744–1815), one time High Sheriff of Nottinghamshire.

Educated at Rugby, he entered the army in 1794. He served throughout the Peninsular War and received the gold medal and one clasp for service at the battles of Fuentes de Oñoro and Vittoria. On the death of Major General Sir William Ponsonby at Waterloo, Clifton commanded the 2nd Union Cavalry Brigade. He was subsequently promoted to the rank of general.

He was appointed Knight Commander of the Order of the Bath (KCB) in the 1838 Coronation Honours, and raised to Knight Grand Cross (GCB) in 1861. He died unmarried on 8 March 1869 aged 98 at his residence in the Old Steine, Brighton.

== Family ==
He was the brother of Sir Robert Clifton, 7th Baronet, Sir Juckes Granville Juckes-Clifton, 8th Baronet and Frances Egerton Clifton who married the Ven. Robert Markham, archdeacon of York, in 1797.

Military offices
Preceded by Prince Albert	Colonel of the 11th (Prince Albert's Own); Regiment of (Light) Dragoons (Hussars); 1842	Succeeded by Lord Greenock
Preceded by Sir Hussey Vivian	Colonel of the 1st (Royal) Regiment of Dragoons; 1842–1869	Succeeded by Charles Philip de Ainslie
