= William Annesley =

William Annesley may refer to:

- William Annesley, 1st Viscount Glerawly (1710–1770), Irish politician and noble
- William Annesley, 3rd Earl Annesley (1772–1838), Irish noble and British Member of Parliament
- William Annesley, 4th Earl Annesley (1830–1874), Irish-born British Conservative politician
- William Annesley (priest) (died 1817), Irish Anglican dean
