= Myers baronets =

Extinct baronetcy in the Baronetage of the United Kingdom

The Myers Baronetcy was a title in the Baronetage of the United Kingdom. It was created on 3 July 1804 for Lieutenant-General William Myers, Commander of the British Forces in the West Indies. The title became extinct in 1811 on the death of the second Baronet, who was killed in action at the Battle of Albuera.

== Myers baronets (1804) ==
- Sir William Myers, 1st Baronet (1751–1805)
- Sir William James Myers, 2nd Baronet (1783–1811)

Baronetage of the United Kingdom
| Preceded by O'Malley baronets | Myers baronets 2 July 1804 | Succeeded by Ainslie baronets |
