= James Annesley (disambiguation) =

James Annesley may refer to:

- James Annesley, 2nd Earl of Anglesey (1645–1690)
- James Annesley, 3rd Earl of Anglesey (1670–1702)
- James Annesley (1715–1760)

== See also ==
- Annesley (disambiguation)
