= Ansley (surname) =

Ansley is a surname. Notable people with the surname include:

- Derrick Ansley (born 1981), American football coach
- Edwin P. Ansley (1865–1923), American real estate developer
- Giselle Ansley (born 1992), English field hockey player
- John Ansley (1774–1845), Lord Mayor of London
- Josh Ansley, American musician
- Mary Anne Ansley (fl. 1810–1840), English artist
- Michael Ansley (born 1967), American basketball player
- Ronald Ansley (1908–1965), Canadian politician
- Sam Ansley (born c. 1959), American football player
- Zachary Ansley (born 1972), Canadian actor

== Fictional characters ==
- Grace Ansley, a character in the short story "Roman Fever" by Edith Wharton
