= 1st The Royal Dragoons =

British Army cavalry regiment

The Royal Dragoons (1st Dragoons)
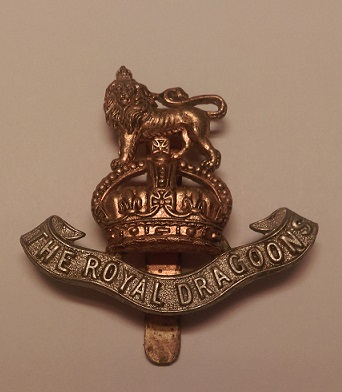
- Cap badge of the regiment
- Active: 1661–1969
- Country: Kingdom of England (1661–1707); Kingdom of Great Britain (1707–1800); United Kingdom (1801–1969)
- Branch: Army
- Type: Cavalry
- Nickname: The Bird Catchers
- Motto: Spectemur agendo (Let us be judged by our deeds)
- Colors: Scarlet uniform with blue facings, black plume.
- March: "The Royals"
- Engagements: Dettingen, Waterloo, Second Boer War, El Alamein

The Royal Dragoons (1st Dragoons) was a heavy cavalry regiment of the British Army. The regiment was formed in 1661 as the Tangier Horse. It served for three centuries and was in action during the First and the Second World Wars. It was amalgamated with the Royal Horse Guards to form The Blues and Royals in 1969.

== History ==
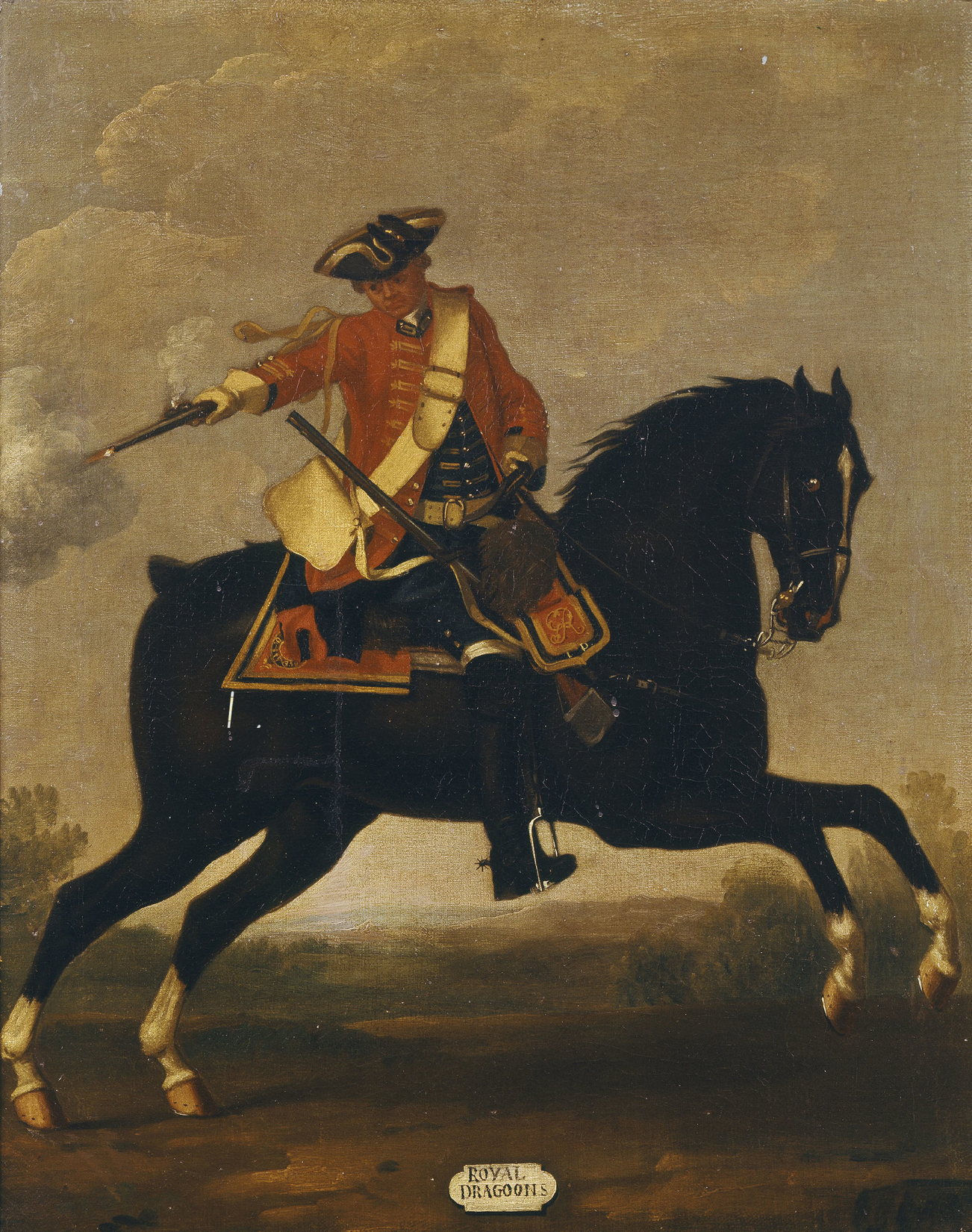
c. 1751 painting of a regimental private

=== Formation ===
The regiment was first raised as a single troop of veterans of the Parliamentary Army in 1661, shortly thereafter expanded to four troops as the Tangier Horse, taking the name from their service in the Garrison of Tangier. For the next few years, the regiment defended Tangier, which had been acquired by the English Crown through the marriage of King Charles II to Catherine of Braganza in April 1662, from Moorish cavalry.

The regiment consisted of four troops, three of which were originally troops in the English Regiment of Light Horse in France attached to the French army of Louis XIV and under the command of Sir Henry Jones. They were constituted in 1672 and, after Jones was killed during the siege of Maastricht in 1673 while serving with the Duke of Monmouth, command passed to the Duke. The regiment was ranked as the 1st Dragoons, the oldest cavalry regiment of the line, in 1674. The regiment was recalled to England in 1678 (it was disbanded in France and reformed in England with most of the same officers) with the expectation of fighting in a war against France. In early 1679, it was disbanded and then reformed in June of that year as Gerard's Regiment of Horse (its colonel being Charles Gerard), with most of the same officers and men, to police the Covenanters in Scotland. The regiment was disbanded in late 1679 and three of its captains, John Coy, Thomas Langston and Charles Nedby, along with their troopers, went out to Tangier in 1680 as reinforcements. When they returned in 1683, they joined what became a new permanent regiment of the Royal Dragoons.

=== Early wars ===
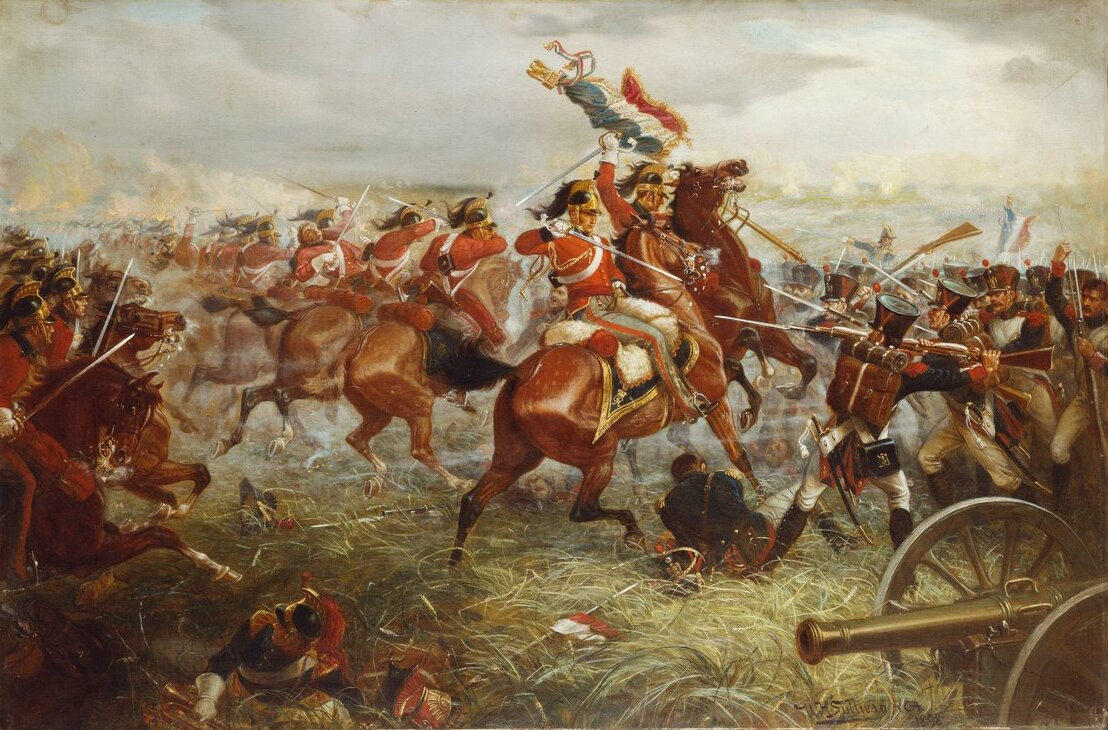
The regiment at the Battle of Waterloo

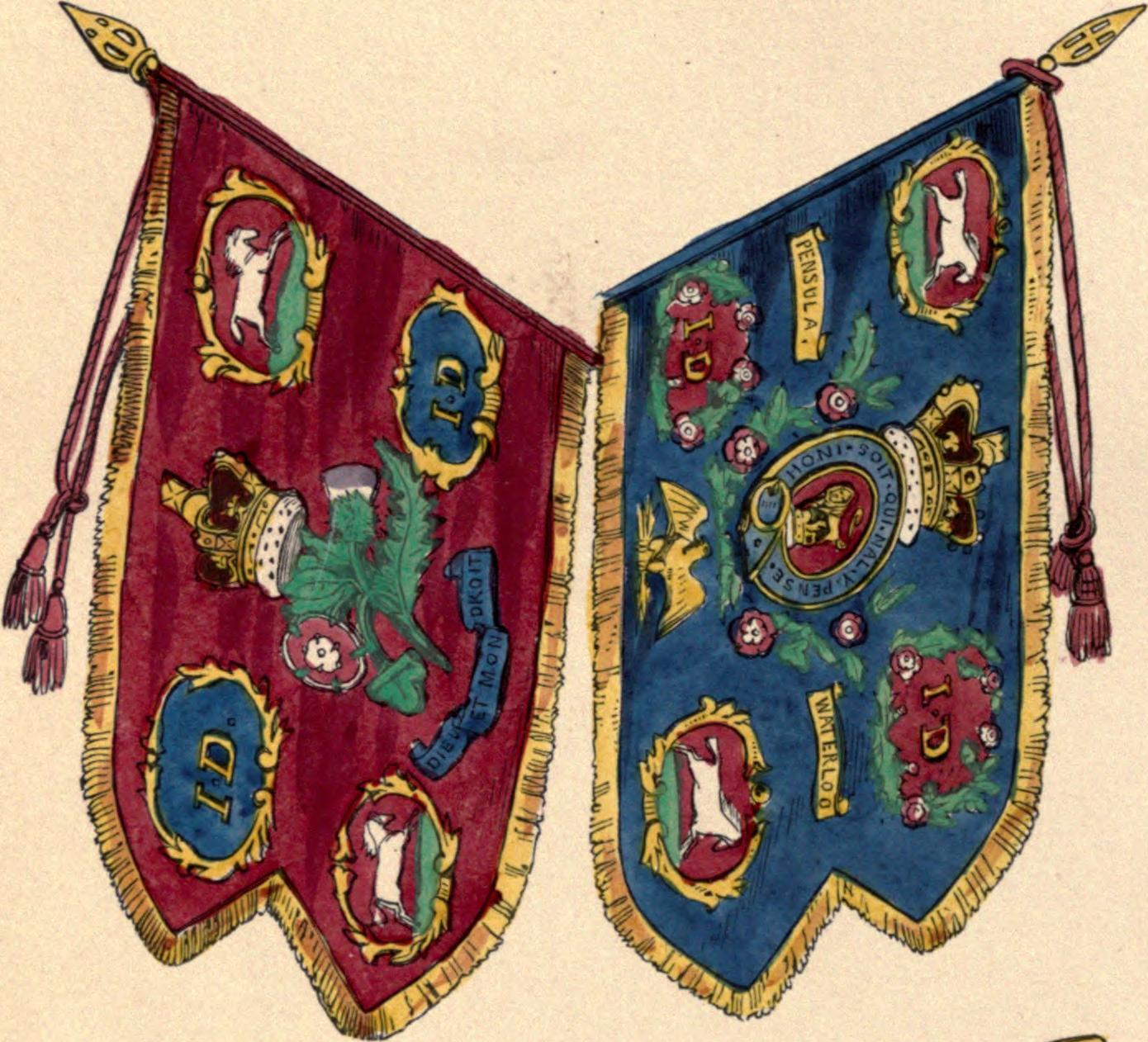
The regimental guidons in 1840

On their return to England in 1683, the three troops were joined with three newly raised troops and titled The King's Own Royal Regiment of Dragoons, named for Charles II. In 1690, the regiment was renamed as simply The Royal Regiment of Dragoons. It fought at the Battle of the Boyne in July 1690 and the Siege of Limerick in August 1690 during the Williamite War in Ireland.

The regiment saw action at the Battle of Dettingen in June 1743 and at the Battle of Fontenoy in May 1745 during the War of the Austrian Succession, and having been formally titled as the 1st (Royal) Regiment of Dragoons in 1751, it took part in the Raid on St Malo in June 1758, the Raid on Cherbourg in August 1758 and the Battle of Warburg in July 1760 during the Seven Years' War.

The regiment also fought at the Battle of Beaumont in April 1794 and the Battle of Willems in May 1794 during the Flanders Campaign. It served under Viscount Wellesley, as the rearguard during the retreat to the Lines of Torres Vedras in September 1810, and charged the enemy at the Battle of Fuentes de Oñoro in May 1811 during the Peninsular War. The regiment also took part in the charge of the Union Brigade under the command of Major-General William Ponsonby at the Battle of Waterloo in June 1815 during the Hundred Days Campaign. Captain Alexander Kennedy Clark of the regiment captured the French Imperial Eagle of the 105th Line Infantry Regiment at Waterloo.

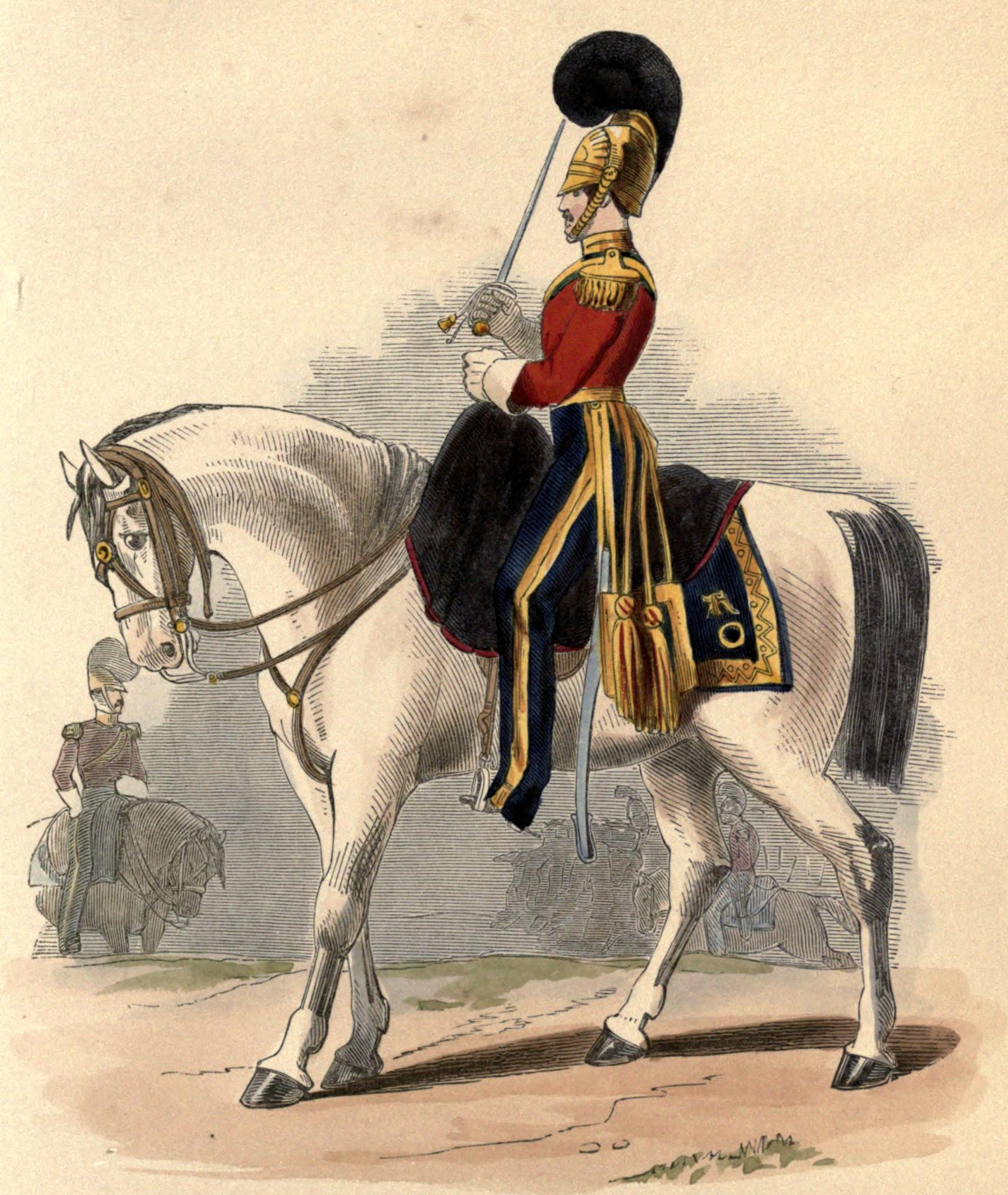
1839 illustration of the regimental uniform

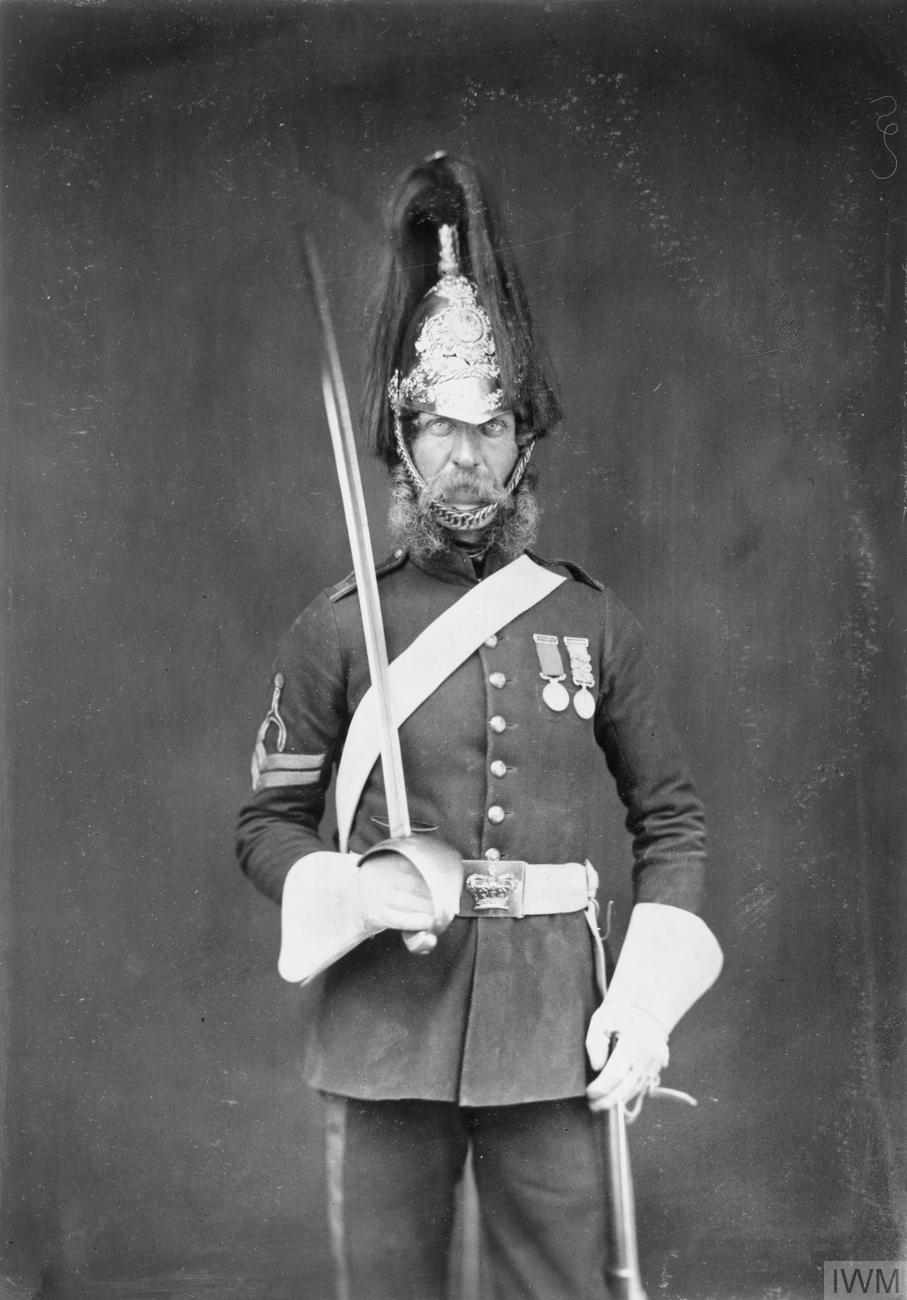
A regimental rough rider who served in the Crimean War

In 1816 a detachment of the regiment was involved with suppressing the Littleport riots. The regiment, under the command of Lieutenant-Colonel John Yorke, also took part in the charge of the heavy brigade at the Battle of Balaclava in October 1854 during the Crimean War. Having been re-titled the 1st (Royal) Dragoons in 1877, the regiment also saw action at the Battle of Abu Klea in January 1885 during the Mahdist War.

=== 20th century wars ===
After the outbreak of the Second Boer War in October 1899, the regiment was sent to South Africa where it arrived at Durban in November. It formed part of the force sent to relieve Ladysmith, taking part in the battles of Colenso (December 1899), Spion Kop (January 1900), and the Tugela Heights (February 1900). In January 1900, the regiment was part of a force that set out to discover the western flank of the Boer lines. It was able to ambush a column of about 200 Boers near Acton Homes and successfully trapped about 40 of them. From June 1900 to April 1901 the regiment was employed guarding the Buffalo River and the Transvaal approaches to the Drakensberg, under the command of Lieutenant Colonel Sclater-Booth. During the rest of the war they were employed in the Transvaal and in the Orange River Colony. Following the end of the war, 623 officers and men of the regiment left South Africa on the SS Kildonan Castle, which arrived at Southampton in October 1902. After their return, they were stationed at Shorncliffe, where they were inspected by their Colonel in Chief Emperor Wilhelm II in November 1902.

The regiment, which had been serving at Potchefstroom in South Africa when the First World War started, returned to the UK and then landed at Ostend as part of the 6th Cavalry Brigade in the 3rd Cavalry Division in October 1914 for service on the Western Front. It took part in the First Battle of Ypres in October 1914, the Second Battle of Ypres in April 1915, the Battle of Loos in September 1915 and the advance to the Hindenburg Line in 1917.

The regiment retitled as the 1st The Royal Dragoons in 1921. It was deployed to Egypt in 1927, to Secunderabad in India in 1929 and to Palestine in 1938.

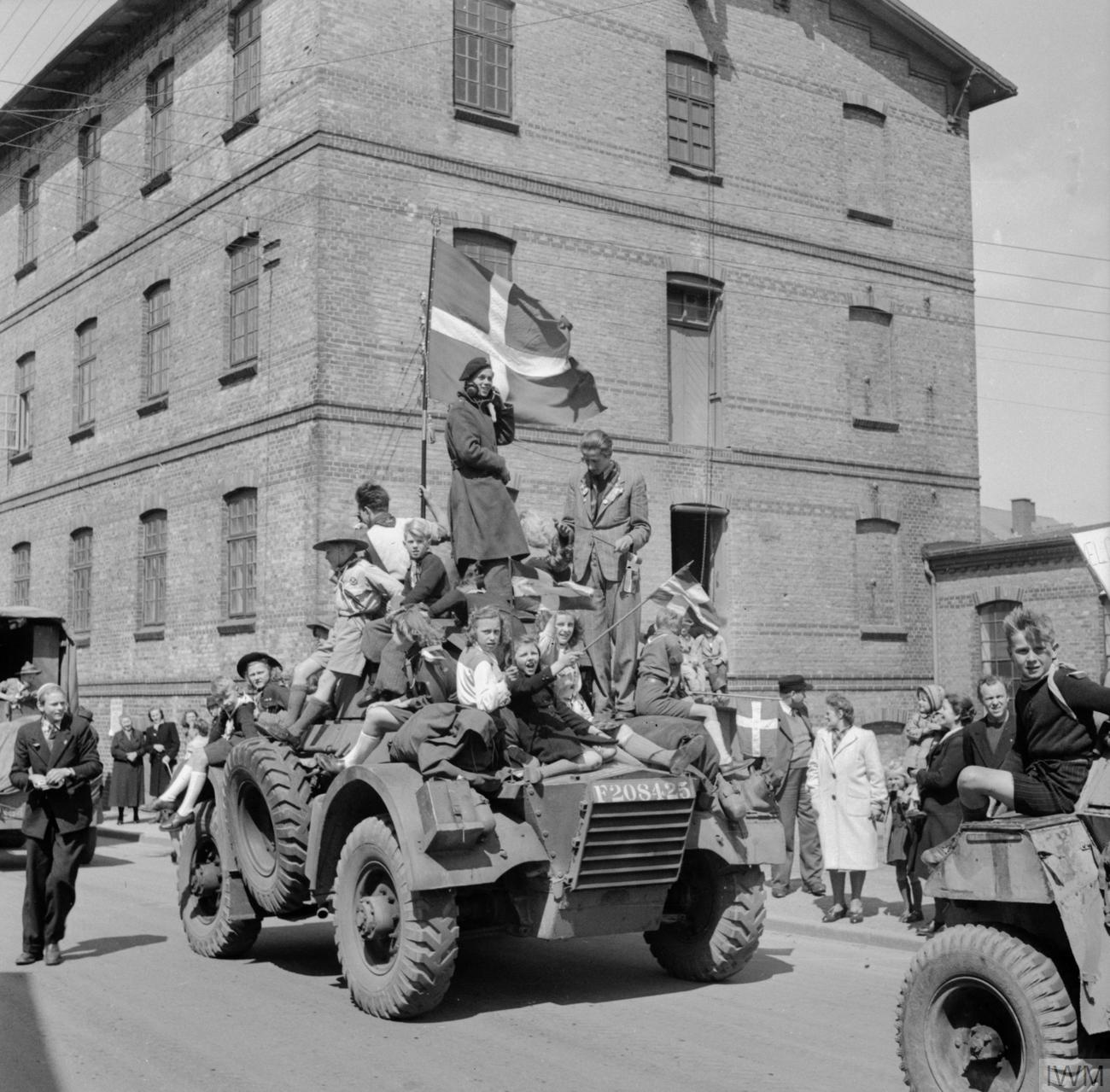
Danish civilians ride on a regimental Daimler armoured car as it enters Haderslev, 7 May 1945

The regiment mechanised shortly after the outbreak of the Second World War and was transferred to the Royal Armoured Corps in 1940. It was deployed to the Western Desert as the Reconnaissance Regiment for the 1st Armoured Division in December 1941; its men were the first troops to enter Benghazi later that month, before seeing action again at the Battle of Gazala in May 1942. It became the Reconnaissance Regiment for the 10th Armoured Division in September 1942 and helped to destroy the enemy supply columns at the Second Battle of El Alamein in October 1942. The regiment saw action during the Allied invasion of Sicily in July 1943 and then briefly took part in the Italian campaign before returning home in December 1943 and taking part in the Normandy landings in July 1944. The regiment took part in the advance to the River Elbe and, after taking 10,000 enemy prisoners, liberated Copenhagen in May 1945.

=== Post-war ===
The regiment moved to Eutin in Schleswig-Holstein in November 1945 and to Dale Barracks in Chester in November 1950. It deployed troops to Egypt in February 1951 and then moved to Combermere Barracks in Wesendorf in May 1954 and to Harewood Barracks in Herford in August 1957. It returned to the UK in September 1959 from where it deployed troops to Aden in November 1959 and to Malaya in December 1960. The regiment survived the immediate post-war reduction in forces, and was re-titled as The Royal Dragoons (1st Dragoons) in 1961. It returned home in October 1962 and then deployed troops to Cyprus in February 1964 before transferring to Hobart Barracks in Detmold in January 1965. It amalgamated with the Royal Horse Guards (The Blues), to form The Blues and Royals in 1969.

== Regimental museum ==
The regimental collection is held by the Household Cavalry Museum which is based at Horse Guards in London.

== Battle honours ==
The regiments battle honours were as follows:

- Early Wars: Tangier 1662–80, Dettingen, Warburg, Beaumont, Willems, Fuentes d'Onor, Peninsula, Waterloo, Balaklava, Sevastopol, Relief of Ladysmith, South Africa 1899–1902
- The Great War: Ypres 1914 '15, Langemarck 1914, Gheluvelt, Nonne Bosschen, Frezenberg, Loos, Arras 1917, Scarpe 1917, Somme 1918, St. Quentin, Avre, Amiens, Hindenburg Line, Beaurevoir, Cambrai 1918, Pursuit to Mons, France and Flanders 1914–18
- The Second World War: Nederrijn, Veghel, Rhine, North-West Europe 1944–45, Syria 1941, Msus, Gazala, Knightsbridge, Defence of Alamein Line, El Alamein, El Agheila, Advance on Tripoli, North Africa 1941–43, Sicily 1943, Italy 1943

== Victoria Cross ==
- Second Lieutenant John Dunville VC (24–25 June 1917)

== Colonels-in-Chief ==
The Colonels-in-Chief of the regiment were as follows:

- 1894–1914: Emperor Wilhelm II KG GCVO KStJ
- 1922–1936: King George V
- 1936–1952: King George VI

== Colonels – with other names for the regiment ==
The colonels of the regiment were as follows:

Tangier Horse – (1661) or 1st Dragoons – (1674).

- 1661–1663: Colonel The Rt Hon. The Earl of Peterborough KG PC FRS
- 1663–1664: Colonel The Rt Hon. The Earl of Teviot
- 1664–1666: Colonel Sir John Bridges
- 1666–1668: Captain Edward Witham
- 1668–1675: Lieutenant Alexander Mackenzie
- 1675–1683: Captain Alexander Mackenzie

The King's Own Royal Regiment of Dragoons – (1683)

- 1683–1685: General Lord Churchill (app. 19 November 1683 – from Lord Churchill's Dragoons)
- 1685–1688: Colonel The Rt Hon. The Viscount Cornbury PC (app. 1 August 1685 – from Hyde's Dragoons or Lord Cornbury's Dragoons)
- 1688: Colonel Richard Clifford. (app. 24 November 1688 – Clifford's Dragoons)
- 1688–1689: Colonel The Rt Hon. The Viscount Cornbury PC (re-app. 31 December 1688 – from Lord Cornbury's Dragoons)
- 1689–1690: Colonel Anthony Heyford (app. 1 July 1689 – from Heyford's Dragoons)

The Royal Regiment of Dragoons – (1690)

- 1690–1697: Brigadier-General Edward Mathews (app. 21 June 1690 – from Mathews' Dragoons)
- 1697–1715: Lieutenant General The Rt Hon. The Earl of Strafford KG DL (app. 30 May 1697 – from Wentworth's Dragoons or Lord Raby's Dragoons or Earl of Strafford's Dragoons)
- 1715–1721: Field Marshal The Rt Hon. The Viscount Cobham PC (app. 13 June 1715 – from Temple's Dragoons or Lord Cobham's Dragoons)
- 1721–1723: Brigadier-General Sir Charles Hotham Bt (app. 10 April 1721 – from Hotham's Dragoons)
- 1723–1739: Lieutenant General Humphrey Gore (app. 12 January 1723 – from Gore's Dragoons)
- 1739–1740: General His Grace The Duke of Marlborough KG PC (app. 1 September 1739 – from Spencer's Dragoons, or Sunderland's Dragoons or Duke of Marlborough's Dragoons)
- 1740–1759: Lieutenant General Henry Hawley (app. 10 May 1740 – from Hawley's Dragoons)

On 1 July 1751, a royal warrant provided that in future regiments would not be known by their colonels' names, but by their "number or rank".

1st (Royal) Regiment of Dragoons – (1751)

- 1759–1764: Field Marshal The Rt Hon. Henry Seymour-Conway (app. 5 April 1759)
- 1764–1794: General The Rt Hon. The Earl of Pembroke (app. 9 May 1764)
- 1794–1801: Lieutenant General Philip Goldsworthy (app. 23 January 1794)
- 1801–1829: General Thomas Garth (app. 7 January 1801)
- 1829–1836: General Lord Robert Somerset GCB (app. 3 November 1829)
- 1836–1837: Major-General The Hon. Sir Frederick Ponsonby GCB GCMG KCH (app. 31 March 1836)
- 1837–1842: Lieutenant General The Rt Hon. The Lord Vivian GCB GCH PC FRS (app. 20 January 1837)
- 1842–1869: General Sir Arthur Clifton GCB KCH (app. 30 August 1842)
- 1869–1889: General Charles de Ainslie (app. 8 March 1869)

1st (Royal) Dragoons – (1877)

- 1889–1890: General John Yorke CB (app. 24 Mar 1889)
- 1890–1900: Lieutenant General Sir Frederick Marshall KCMG (app. 29 March 1890)
- 1900–1912: Major General Francis Russell CMG (app. 9 June 1900)
- 1912–1919: Major General The Hon. John Lindley (app. 22 March 1912)
- 1919–1931: Major General Sir John Burn-Murdoch KCVO CB CMG CBE (app. 16 April 1919)

1st The Royal Dragoons – (1921)

- 1931–1946: Brigadier-General Sir Ernest Makins KBE CB DSO (app. 22 Jan 1931)
- 1946–1954: Colonel Francis Wilson-Fitzgerald DSO MC (app. 13 October 1946)
- 1954–1964: Brigadier Anthony Pepys DSO (app. 9 December 1954)
- 1964–1969: General Sir Desmond Fitzpatrick GCB GCVO DSO MBE MC (app. 9 December 1964)

In 1969 the regiment amalgamated with Royal Horse Guards (The Blues), to form The Blues and Royals (Royal Horse Guards and 1st Dragoons).

== Commanding Officers ==
Among the Commanding Officers have been:

- Lt.-Col. John Francis Burn-Murdoch, CB: February 1898 – February 1902
- Lt.-Col. George Limbrey Sclater-Booth, 2nd Baron Basing, CB: February 1902 – February 1906
- Lt.-Col. Henry de Beauvoir De Lisle, CB, DSO: February 1906 – 1909
- Lt.-Col. Ernest Makins, DSO: January 1910 – ?
- Lt.-Col. Frederick Courtenay Longuet Hulton
- Lt.-Col. Philip B. Fielden: January 1959 – July 1961
- Lt.-Col. Kenneth F. Timbrell: July 1961 – July 1962
- Lt.-Col. Richard E. Worsley: July 1962 – December 1965
- Lt.-Col. Peter D. Reid: December 1965 – January 1968
- Lt.-Col. Richard M. H. Vickers: January 1968 – March 1969

== See also ==
- British cavalry during the First World War
