= Frederick Marshall (British Army officer) =

British Army officer

Lieutenant-General Sir Frederick Marshall KCMG
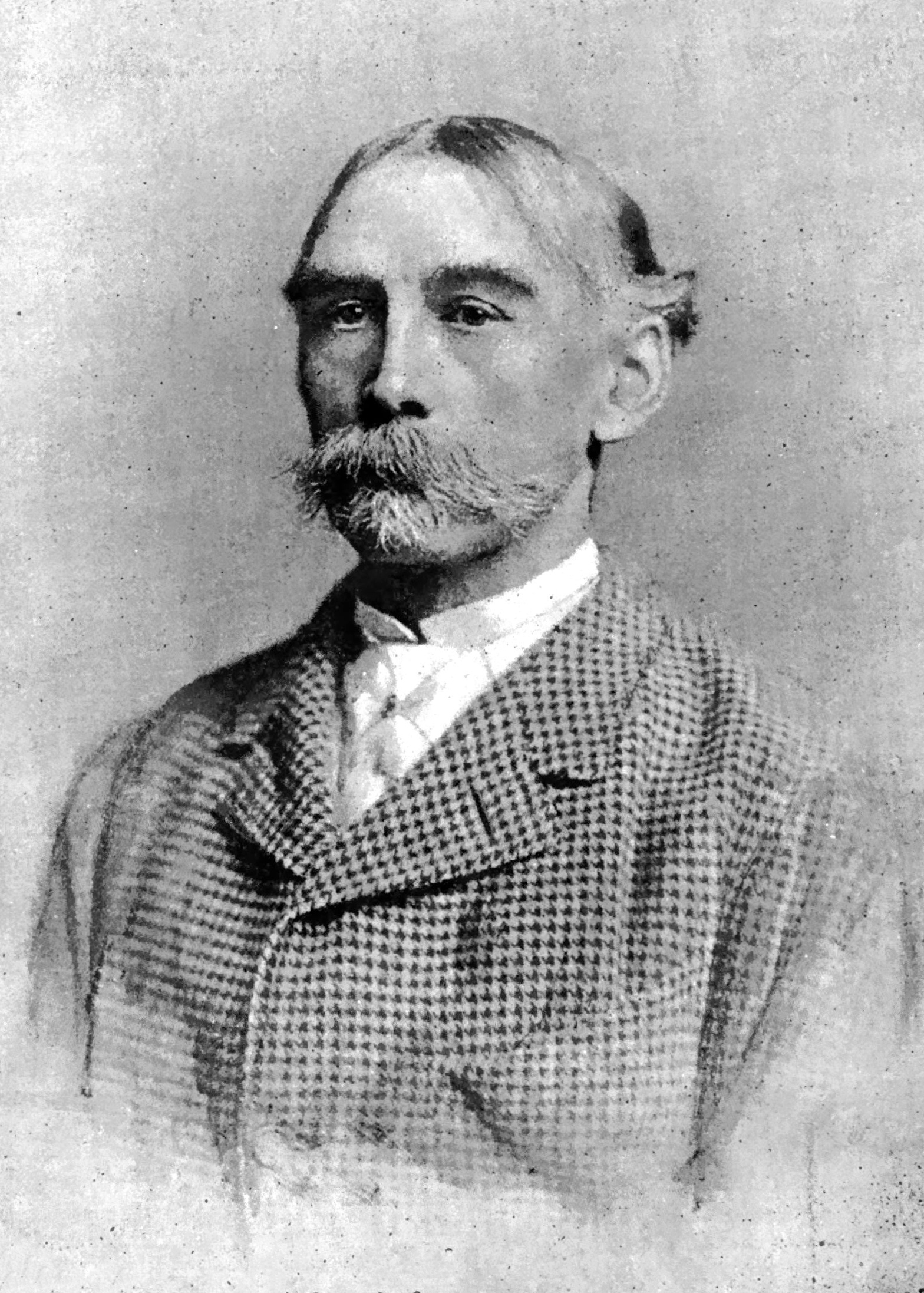
- Born: 26 July 1829; Edenbridge, Kent, England
- Died: 8 June 1900 (aged 70)
- Burial place: Brookwood Cemetery, Surrey, England
- Military career
- Allegiance: United Kingdom
- Branch: British Army
- Service years: 1849–1884
- Rank: Lieutenant-General
- Units: 10th Hussars; 1st Dragoons
- Commands: 2nd Regiment of Life Guards
- Conflicts: Crimean War; Anglo-Zulu War
- Awards: Knight Commander of the Order of St Michael and St George

Lieutenant-General Sir Frederick Marshall KCMG (26 July 1829 – 8 June 1900) was a British Army officer.

== Military career ==
Marshall was commissioned as a cornet in the 10th Hussars on 18 September 1849. He was promoted to lieutenant on 16 September 1851 and, after transferring to the 1st Regiment of Dragoons on 14 October 1851, he saw action in the Crimean War and was promoted to captain on 4 February 1859.

Marshall was promoted further to major on 6 March 1863. Promoted to lieutenant colonel on 8 March 1864, he was given command of the 2nd Regiment of Life Guards. He was then promoted to full colonel on 6 March 1868 and to major general on 20 October 1877.

After taking part in the Anglo-Zulu War in spring 1879, Marshall was appointed a Companion of the Order of St Michael and St George on 19 December 1879. He was promoted to lieutenant general on his retirement on 5 September 1884 and advanced to Knight Commander of the Order of St Michael and St George on 22 June 1897.

Marshall served as colonel of the 1st (Royal) Dragoons from 1890 to 1900.

== First-class cricket ==
Marshall played first-class cricket for several teams in the 1850s and 1860s, debuting for the Marylebone Cricket Club (MCC) against Sussex at Horsham in 1854. Playing first-class cricket until 1865, the played eight matches for the MCC, but also appeared five times for the Gentlemen of Marylebone Cricket Club, four times for the Gentlemen of England, twice for the South in the North v South fixture, and once each for the Gentlemen of the South and the Surrey Club. Appearing in 21 first-class matches, he scored a total of 244 runs at an average of 7.87, with a highest score of 31.

Honorary titles
Preceded by John Yorke	Colonel of the 1st (Royal) Dragoons; 1890–1900	Succeeded by Francis Shirley Russell
