= James Ainslie =

James Ainslie may refer to:

- James Ainslie (cricketer) (1880–1953), Australian cricketer
- James Ainslie (pastoralist) (1787–1844), Scottish pastoralist
