= Thomas Corbett (Lincolnshire MP) =

British politician

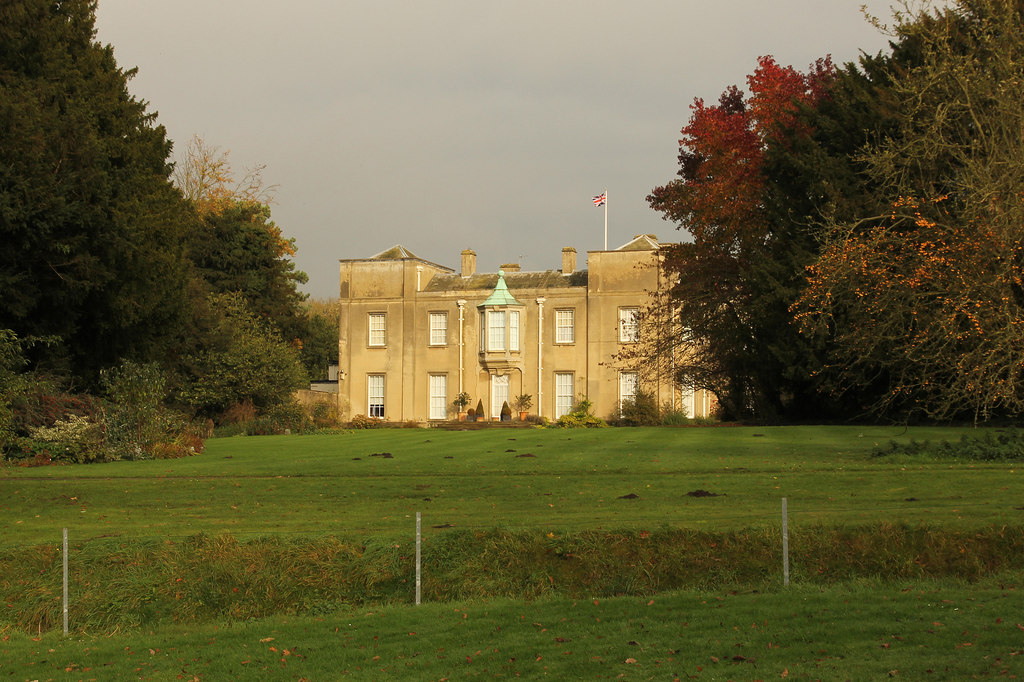
Elsham Hall, family seat of Thomas George Corbett

Thomas George Corbett (1796–1868) was an English Member of Parliament, and High Sheriff of Lincolnshire in 1840.

== Background ==
Thomas Corbett was the son of William Corbett (died 1832) of Darnhall and his wife Jane Eleanor, daughter of George Ainslie (British Army officer, died 1804). His mother's uncles included Colonel Sir Philip Ainslie of Pilton and Sir Robert Ainslie, 1st Baronet, MP and ambassador to the Ottoman Empire. In 1810 William Corbett changed his name to William Thompson Corbett, to inherit the Elsham estate from his mother's great-uncle Robert Thompson.

== Political career ==
Corbett was elected in the 1835 United Kingdom general election and sat for two and a half years, until the 1837 election, triggered by the death of King William. He was a Conservative; he replaced the previous Tory candidate, Sir Robert Sheffield.

His constituency was Lindsey, Lincolnshire, known then as the Parts of Lindsey (the northernmost of the three administrative divisions of Lincolnshire, the others being Holland and Kesteven). The seat was created by the Reform Act 1832, and Corbett succeeded William Amcotts-Ingilby. The Parts of Lindsey elected two members; Corbett sat alongside the Whig MP Charles Anderson-Pelham, later Lord Wolsey, 2nd Earl of Yarborough.

In 2015 the Working Class Movement Library acquired papers related to Corbett's expenses for the 1835 campaign. The Chartist demand for a secret ballot would not succeed till the Ballot Act 1872; meanwhile, parliamentary candidates were expected to "treat" the voters to ensure their favour. According to the library:

Corbett arrived on the scene less than two weeks before he was presented to the electorate, a Conservative candidate for one of the two MP posts that were up for grabs in a constituency represented by a Whig and by the radical reformer Ingilby, who had been an MP in the area for the previous 15 years. To displace one of these men in such a short period, Corbett had a difficult task ahead. Breakfasts and grog had to be bought for potential voters, and wagons must be secured to transport them to the polling stations. Musicians, flag bearers, and 'protection' must be hired. There was a barrel of tar to burn, and ribbon to buy. Yards and yards of pink ribbon to festoon the place with the Tory candidate's colours.

== Marriage and descendants ==
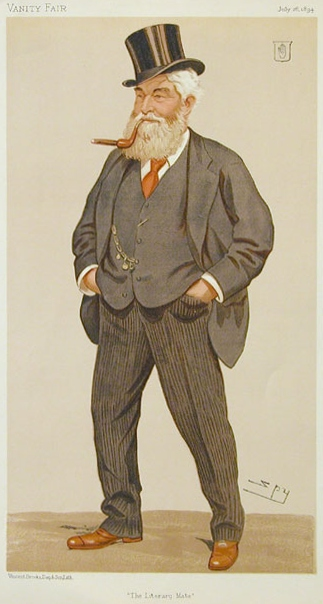
Sir John Dugdale Astley, husband of Eleanor Corbett, as caricatured by Spy (Leslie Ward) in Vanity Fair, July 1894

In 1837 Thomas Corbett married Lady Mary Noel Beauclerk (1810–1850), the daughter of William Beauclerk, 8th Duke of St Albans and his second wife Maria, née Nelthorpe. The wedding took place at Easton Hall, the home of Sir Montague Cholmeley, 2nd Baronet and his wife Georgiana, Lady Mary's elder sister.

The couple had one daughter, Eleanor Blanche Mary Corbett, who married in 1858 Sir John Dugdale Astley, 3rd Baronet. She inherited Elsham Hall on her father's death in 1868, thus bringing the house to the Astley family. Eleanor and John's eldest son took the additional name of Corbett and so became Sir Francis Edmund George Astley-Corbett, 4th Baronet. He inherited the property on the death of his father in 1894.

The Corbetts are the ancestors of Samantha Cameron, wife of the former prime minister David Cameron. She is the daughter of Sir Reginald Sheffield, 8th Baronet and is therefore descended from two of the Lincolnshire Tory MPs from the 1830s, Thomas Corbett and his predecessor, Sir Robert Sheffield.

== Property ==
Corbett inherited estates in several English counties. Elsham Hall near Elsham, North Lincolnshire, for generations the property of families intertwined with the Corbetts, was leased to Jane Gardiner as a girls' boarding school from 1800 to 1814. Later it became Thomas Corbett's family seat, along with Darnhall, in the county of Chester, an estate brought into the family by Thomas Corbett (secretary of the Admiralty) (died 1751). Thomas George Corbett also owned Ryther in North Yorkshire, via the Barons Haversham. In 1844 Corbett was listed in White's Directories as lord of the manor of Wilby, Suffolk

Parliament of the United Kingdom
Preceded by William Amcotts-Ingilby; Charles Anderson-Pelham	Member of Parliament for North Lincolnshire; 1835–1837; With: Charles Anderson-Pelham	Succeeded by Charles Anderson-Pelham; Robert Adam Christopher
