= Sir William Myers, 1st Baronet =

Lieutenant-General Sir William Myers, 1st Baronet (c. 1 March 1750/51 – 29 July 1805) was a British soldier, born in Whitehaven. His father was Christopher Myers of Monkstown, County Dublin [formerly of Whitehaven] who was the architect of the Chapel of Trinity College Dublin. His mother was Jean Graham, cousin to the 3rd Duke of Montrose.

His army career included service in the 26th Foot (Major, 13 May 1781); in the 15th Foot (Lieutenant-Colonel, 14 February 1786); in North America (brevet Colonel, May 1793); as Deputy Quartermaster-General in Leeward Islands, 1793; as Quartermaster-General on staff, November 1794; and subsequently as Major-General, 14 May 1796; and finally Lieutenant-General. He was also the first Colonel of the 2nd West India Regiment when that was established in 1795 in Martinique. He was at some point Governor of Tobago; Commander in Chief in the Southern District of Ireland; and Commander in Chief in the Leeward Islands.

He was created Baronet in 1804, and died in Barbados on 29 July 1805. He is buried in St. Michael's Cathedral, Bridgetown. His memorial was designed by Robert Blore.

== Bibliography ==
- The Napoleon Series [Web site]: The entry for 15th Foot provides an outline of much of Sir William's career, drawn from the regimental Muster rolls in The National Archives and The Army Lists.
- Buckley, R.N. 1975. The Early History of the West India Regiments 1795-1815: A Study in British Colonial Military History. PhD Dissertation. Montreal, Canada: McGill University. [Published as: Slaves in Red Coats: the British West India Regiments, 1795-1815. New Haven, CT, USA: Yale University Press, 1979.]
- Caulfield, J.E. 1899. One Hundred Years' History of the 2nd Batt: West India Regiment from Date of Raising 1795 to 1898. London, UK: Forster, Groom & Co.
- “Myers”. 1844. In: A Genealogical and Heraldic History of the Extinct and Dormant Baronetcies in England, Ireland and Scotland, compiled by J. Burke and J.B. Burke, 2nd edition: 351. London, UK: John Russell Smith.
- Oliver, V.L. 1989. Monumental Inscriptions: Tombstones of the Island of Barbados, pp. 8, 19. San Bernardino, CA, USA.

Military offices
Preceded by Sir Charles Green	Commander-in-Chief Windward and Leeward Islands; 1804–1805	Succeeded by Henry Bowyer
Baronetage of the United Kingdom
New creation	Baronet; 1804–1805	Succeeded by William Myers
