= John Yorke (British Army officer) =

British Army officer

General John Yorke CB
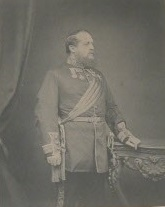
- Born: 1814
- Died: 1890 (aged 75–76)
- Military career
- Allegiance: United Kingdom
- Branch: British Army
- Service years: 1832–1890
- Rank: General
- Unit: 1st Dragoons
- Conflicts: Crimean War
- Awards: Companion of the Order of the Bath

General John Yorke CB (1814–1890) was a British Army officer.

== Military career ==
Born the son of Simon Yorke of Erddig (1771–1834) and Margaret Holland (1778–1848), Yorke was commissioned as a cornet in the 1st (Royal) Regiment of Dragoons on 21 December 1832. He was promoted to lieutenant on 5 December 1834, to captain on 14 December 1841, to major on 4 September 1849 and to lieutenant colonel on 4 April 1853.

Yorke was severely wounded as he commanded the 1st (Royal) Regiment of Dragoons when the regiment took part in the charge of the Heavy Brigade at the Battle of Balaclava in October 1854 during the Crimean War: his leg was shattered and he was disabled for life. Appointed a Companion of the Order of the Bath on 10 July 1855, he was promoted to full colonel on 23 March 1856 and awarded the Order of the Medjidie, 4th Class, for his role in the war, on 2 March 1858.

In 1861 he acquired Plas Newydd in Llangollen where he lived in retirement, added the black and white features on the exterior and filled the interior with oddities from around the world. He became commandant of the Royal Military Asylum on 1 April 1864. He was promoted to major general on 17 June 1866, to lieutenant general on 1 August 1874 and to full general on 1 October 1877.

Yorke served as colonel of the 19th Hussars from 1872 to 1889 and as colonel of the 1st (Royal) Dragoons from 1889 until his death in 1890.

== Sources ==
- Kinglake, Alexander William (1908). The Invasion of the Crimea. Vol. 5. Blackwood.

Military offices
Preceded by John Hall	Colonel of the 19th Hussars; 1872–1889	Succeeded by Coote Synge-Hutchinson
Preceded by Charles Philip de Ainslie	Colonel of the 1st (Royal) Dragoons; 1889–1890	Succeeded by Sir Frederick Marshall
