= Arthur Annesley =

Arthur Annesley may refer to:

- Arthur Annesley, 1st Earl of Anglesey (1614–1686), Anglo-Irish royalist statesman, succeeded as 2nd Viscount Valentia
- Arthur Annesley, 4th Baron Altham (1689–1727), grandson of the 1st Earl of Anglesey, a claim was made against his brother Richard as successor
- Arthur Annesley, 5th Earl of Anglesey (1678–1737), Anglo-Irish Tory politician, succeeded as 6th Viscount Valentia
- Arthur Annesley, 1st Earl of Mountnorris (1744–1816), British peer, succeeded as 8th Viscount Valentia
- Arthur Annesley (1760–1841), British politician and MP for Oxford, father of the 10th Viscount Valentia
- Arthur Annesley, 10th Viscount Valentia (1785–1863), descendant of the 1st Viscount Valentia
- Arthur Annesley, 11th Viscount Valentia (1843–1927), British politician and Comptroller of the Household, grandson of the 10th Viscount Valentia
- Arthur Noël Grove Annesley (born 1941), British auctioneer, honorary chairman of Christie's.
