= Richard Annesley =

Richard Annesley may refer to:

- Richard Annesley, 3rd Baron Altham (1655–1701), Dean of Exeter and son of Arthur, 1st Earl of Anglesey
- Richard Annesley, 6th Earl of Anglesey (1693–1761), Irish peer, kidnapper and bigamist, son of the 3rd Baron Altham
- Richard Annesley, 2nd Earl Annesley (1745–1824), Irish politician and Member of the Irish Parliament
- Richard John Dighton Annesley, 15th Viscount Valentia (1929–2005), British Army officer
