= Ainslee =

Ainslee may refer to:

- Mary Ainslee (1919–1991), American film actress
- Ainslee Cox (1936–1988), American music conductor
- Ainslee Lamb, Canadian field hockey coach
- Ainslee's Magazine, American literary periodical published from 1897 to December 1926
- Winifred Ainslee (1924–1991), American actress

== See also ==
- Ainslie (disambiguation)
- Ansley
