= Ainslee Lamb =

Canadian field hockey coach

Ainslee Lamb is a field hockey coach from Toronto, Ontario, Canada. She is a 1994 graduate of the University of Toronto and earned a Master of Science degree from the University of Massachusetts in 1996. She played field hockey at both Toronto and UMass and earned NCAA Tournament All-Star in 1992 after UMass reached the Final Four tournament.

Lamb was head coach of the Yale University field hockey team from 1999 to 2003. In 2005, she became head coach of Boston College, where she coached for 10 years. Under her lead, the Eagles recorded a winning record and have received many accolades.

At the end of the 2014–15 season, Lamb resigned her position as head coach. Associate head coach Kelly Doton has taken her place to lead the Eagles. Ainslee Lamb is now the director of field hockey for College Connection and White Mountain Sports. She is also an active coach for the USA Field Hockey program.
