= Philip Ainslie =

Sir Philip Ainslie

Colonel Sir Philip Ainslie of Pilton (1728–1802) was a Scottish landowner. He was regimental Colonel of the 7th Dragoons.

== Life ==
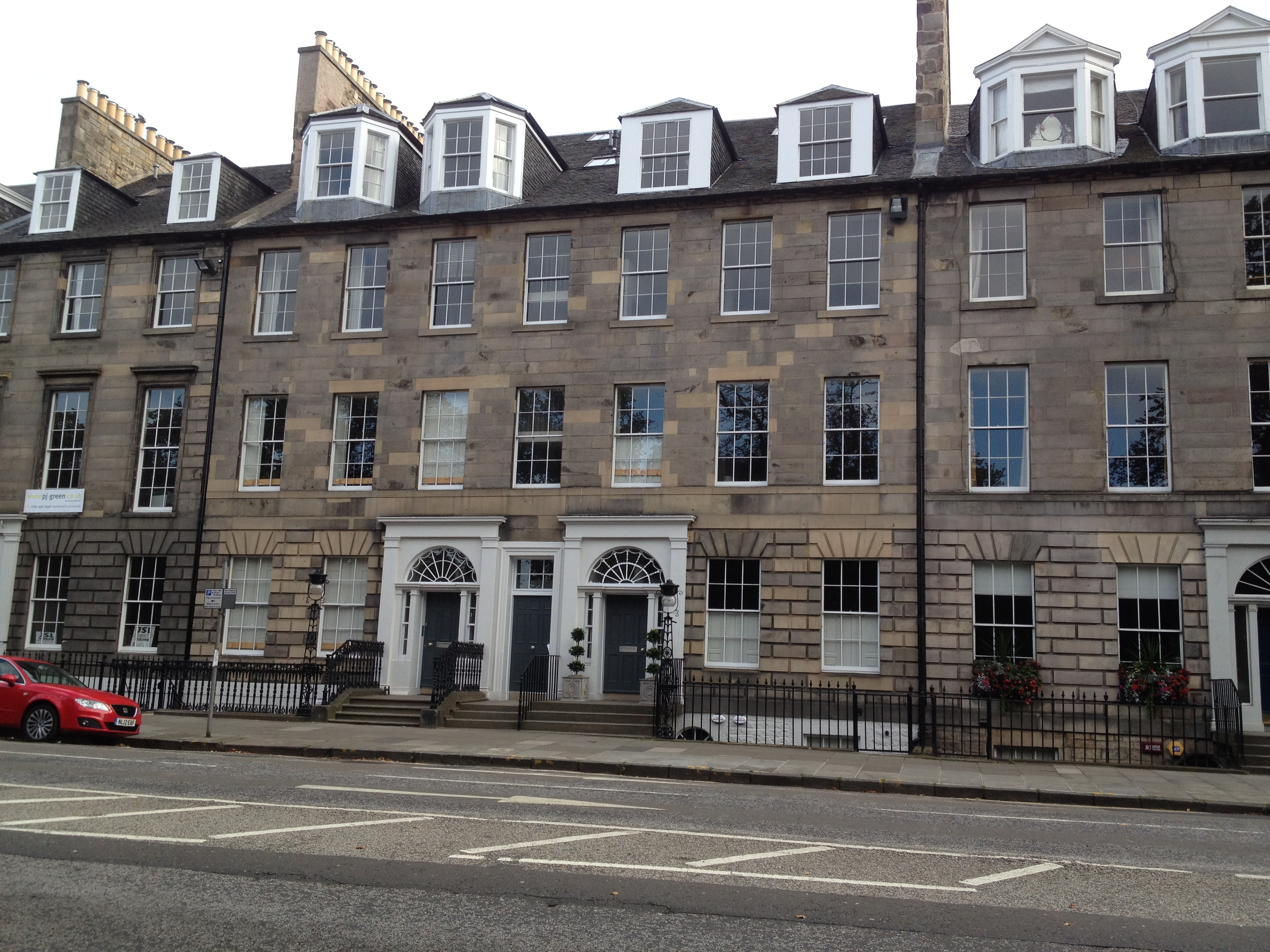
Queen Street 55-57, Edinburgh

He was born in 1728 in Pilton, Edinburgh, the second son of George Ainslie (d.1773), a merchant who made a fortune in Bordeaux, and his wife, Jane Anstruther, daughter of Sir Philip Anstruther. His older brother was General George Ainslie. His younger brother was Sir Robert Ainslie, 1st Baronet.

He was educated at Westminster School and joined the British Army in 1754. He saw action as a Lt Colonel in Portugal and served as aide-de-camp to Prince Charles of Mecklenburg. He was knighted by George III in 1778.

In 1784, he was living at 38 St Andrews Square which was then a newly built house in Edinburgh's New Town.

He retired in 1786 and died on 19 May 1802 aged 74. His final years were spent at 57 Queen Street in Edinburgh.

== Family ==
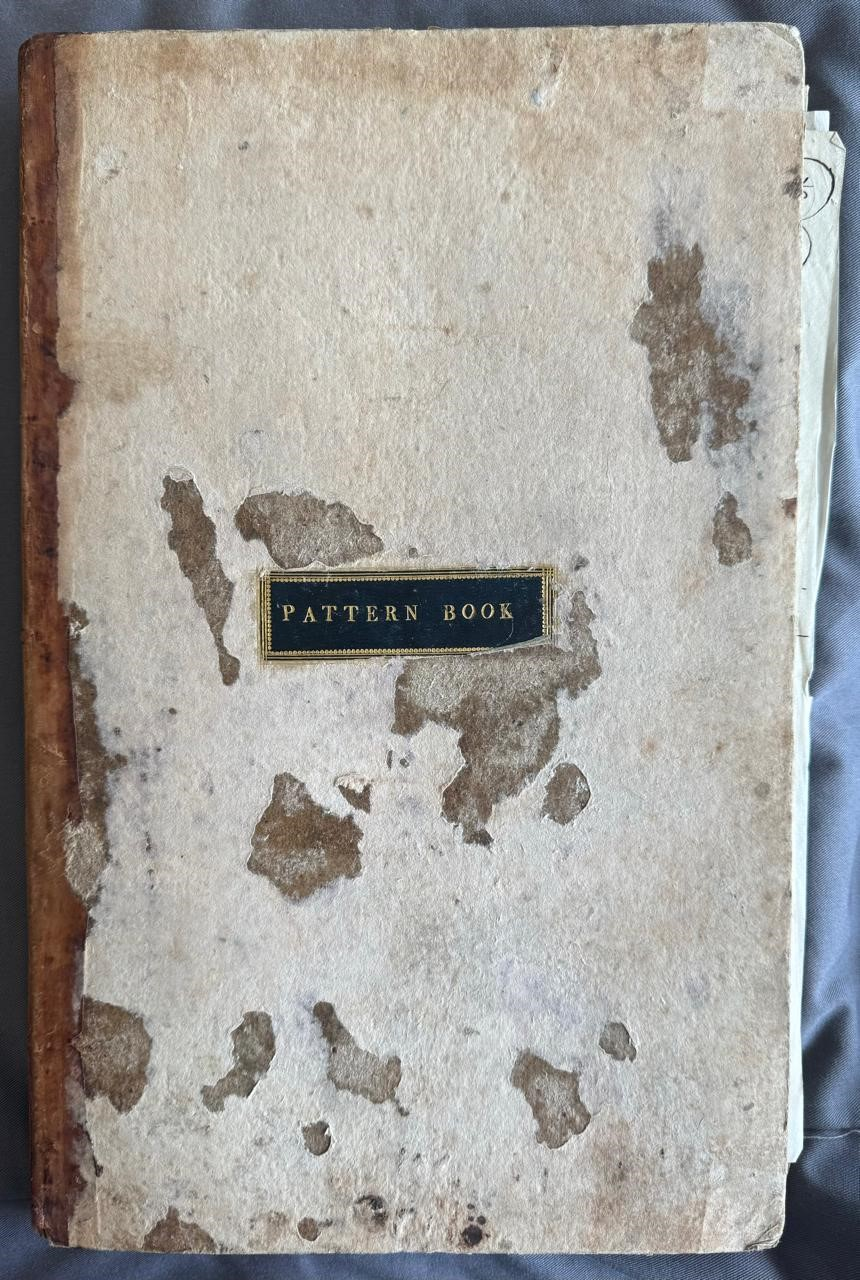
Cover from the Pattern Book of Charlotte Elizabeth Inglis. 1807-1816.

In March 1772 in Edinburgh he married the Hon. Elizabeth Gray daughter of John Gray, 11th Lord Gray.

They were parents to General George Robert Ainslie, who divided the Pilton estate into East and West Pilton farms. His daughter, Margaret Jane Ainslie, married Francis Stuart, 10th Earl of Moray. His great-nephew was Thomas Corbett, MP.

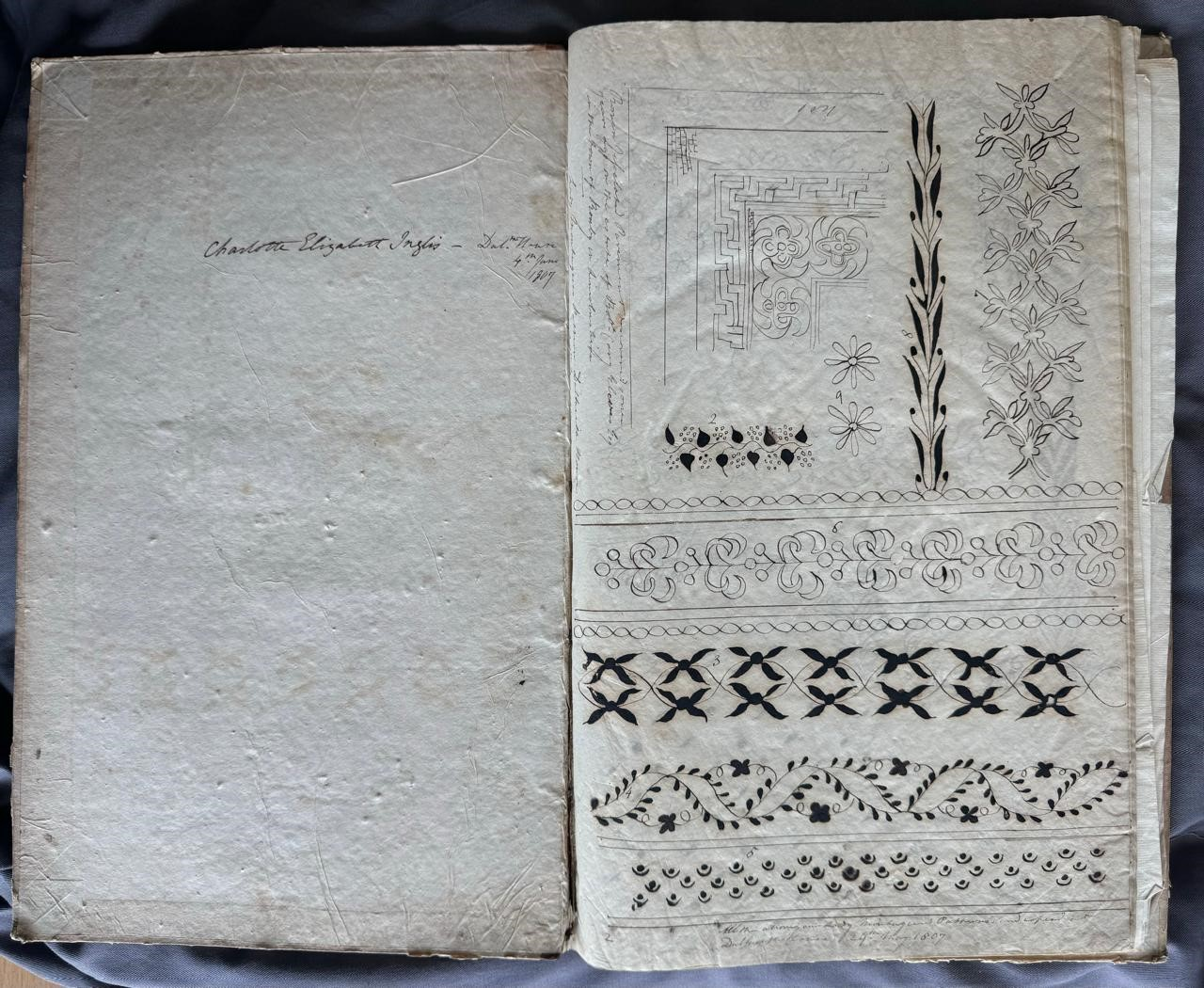
Pattern Book of Charlotte Elizabeth Inglis. 1807-1816.

A Pattern Book belonging to his daughter Charlotte Elizabeth Inglis is held by the University of Edinburgh Heritage Collections.

== Artistic recognition ==
His portrait by Sir Joshua Reynolds was reproduced as a mezzotint by James Scott.
