= William Annesley (priest) =

Irish Anglican Dean

William Annesley was an Irish Anglican Dean.

Annesley was educated at Trinity College Dublin. He was Dean of Down from 1787 until his death in 1817.
