= Brodie Ainslie =

Australian rules footballer

Personal information
- Full name: Brodie Ainslie
- Born: 10 August 1891; Armadale, Victoria
- Died: 17 December 1944 (aged 53); Glen Iris, Victoria
- Original team: Armadale
- Height: 179 cm (5 ft 10 in)

Playing career^{1}
Years	Club	Games (Goals)
1911	St Kilda	1 (0)
- ^{1} Playing statistics correct to the end of 1911.

Brodie Ainslie (10 August 1891 – 17 December 1944) was an Australian rules footballer who played for St Kilda in the Victorian Football League (VFL).

Ainslie played one match for St Kilda in 1911 and scored no goals.

He served in both the Australian Imperial Force (7th Battalion) during World War I and the Second Australian Imperial Force during World War II.

He died suddenly in 1944, six months after being discharged.
