= Ansley (given name) =

Ansley is a given name. Notable people with the name include:

- Ansley B. Borkowski (1898–1992), American lawyer and politician
- Ansley Cargill (born 1982), American tennis player
- Ansley Constance, Seychellois politician
- Ansley J. Coale (1917–2002), American demographer
- Ansley Truitt (1950–2021), American basketball player
- Ansley Wilcox (1856–1930), American scholar, lawyer and civil service reform commissioner
