= Ainslie Wood =

Ainslie Wood may refer to:

Places

- Ainslie Wood, Ontario, a residential neighbourhood in Hamilton, Ontario, Canada
- Ainslie Wood, London, a local nature reserve in Greater London
