= Joe Ainley =

English cricketer

Joe Ainley (28 October 1878 – 18 November 1907) was an English first-class cricketer: a wicket-keeper and right-handed batsman.

Born in Huddersfield, Yorkshire, Ainley played 19 games for Worcestershire County Cricket Club in 1905 and 1906, and in all claimed 26 catches and four stumpings; his highest first-class score was 13.

Ainley died at the age of barely 29 in Sparkbrook, Birmingham.
