= Ainsley Canal =

Canal in Chennai, India

Coordinates: 13.088873°N 80.247413°E

Ainsley canal is a short canal located in Chennai. The canal starts near Villivakkam railway station and connects Otteri Nullah with railway quarters and Integral Coach Factory near Ayanavaram. It runs for a length of about 3.3 kilometres (2.1 mi).

It has become highly polluted, with the residents of Pilkington Road, Vasantha Garden, Appathurai Main Road, Palayakaran Street and Madurai Street dumping wastes. The plight of the canal has not improved though the railways has desilted the canal in year 2006.
