= Ainlay =

Ainlay is a surname. Notable people with the surname include:

- Chuck Ainlay, record producer
- Harry Dean Ainlay (1887–1970), Canadian educator and politician
  - Harry Ainlay Composite High School, Canadian high school located in Edmonton, Alberta, Canada
- Stephen Ainlay, American college president
