= Sir Robert Ainslie, 1st Baronet =

British politician

Sir Robert Ainslie, 1st Baronet (c. 1730 – 21 July 1812) was a British ambassador to the Ottoman Empire, orientalist, numismatist and Member of Parliament (MP) for the rotten borough of Milborne Port, in Somerset, between 1796 and 1802.

== Biography ==
=== Early life and family ===
He was the third and youngest son of George Ainslie, Esq., from a Lasswade family, who married Jane, daughter of Sir Philip Anstruther of Anstrutherfield, and died in 1773. The issue of the marriage of George Ainslie was a family of eight children and included five daughters, four of whom were married and established in France. The elder brothers of Ainslie were Sir Philip Ainslie, knight, who was born in 1728 and died on 19 June 1802 and George Ainslie, a general in the army, colonel of the 13th regiment of foot and lieutenant-governor of the Scilly Islands who died in 1804.

Ainslie, who was born about 1730, is described as having resided in the earlier part of his life at Bordeaux, where his father had been for some time settled as a merchant. He is said to have returned to Scotland in 1727 and to have purchased the estate of Pilton, in the county of Midlothian.

=== Ambassador to Ottoman Empire ===
Ainslie is first noticed in the London Gazette on 20 September 1775: "The king has been pleased to appoint Robert Ainslie, Esq., to be his majesty's ambassador to the Ottoman Porte, in the room of John Murray, Esq., deceased; and his majesty was pleased this day to confer upon him the honour of knighthood, upon which occasion he had the honour to kiss his majesty's hand".

He left England in May 1776 for Constantinople, where he arrived on 2 October. Ainslie had the reputation in Turkey of being a great favourite and boon companion of Sultan Abdul Hamid I. Ainslie returned to England in 1791. He was given leave to return home on 22 September 1793 and left Turkey sometime in 1794.

=== Member of Parliament ===
On 8 September 1796, Ainslie received a grant of a pension of £1,000 on the civil list to be held "during the joint lives of his majesty and himself" and was elected a Member of Parliament. It met on the 27th of the same month, with Lord Paget as his colleague, for the close borough of Milborne Port, Somerset. At the general election of 1802, his seat in Parliament was transferred to Hugh Leycester.

He was created a baronet of Great Torrington, in the County of Lincoln, on 13 October 1804, with remainder, in default of issue male, to his nephew, Robert Sharpe Ainslie, son of General George Ainslie. The Gentleman's Magazine for December 1796 recorded the death of his son on 20 December 1796 from a violent fever. His great-nephew was Thomas Corbett.

Ainslie died after a long illness aged 83 at Bath, England, on 21 July 1812.

== Numismatics ==
Ainslie took advantage of his position at Constantinople to amass a collection of ancient coins from Eastern Europe, Asia Minor, and the north of Africa. The most characteristic were described by abbot Domenico Sestini, who dedicated to Ainslie a work which has gone through several editions, entitled Lettere e Dissertazioni Numismatiche sopra alcune Medaglie rare della Collezione Ainslieana, 4 vols. 4to, Leghorn, 1789–90, a fifth volume of which, with the enlarged title e di altri Musei, appeared at Rome in 1794, and four others, referring to particular collections, were published at Berlin in 1804–06.

Sestini continued his exposition of the Ainslie collection in a smaller work, and more special in its scope, entitled Dissertazione sopra alcune Monete Armene del Principi Rupinensi della Collezione Ainslieana, 4to, Leghorn, 1790. This work is at present bound up with a copy of the first four volumes of the Lettere e Dissertazioni, which, according to an inscription, probably autographic, on the fly-leaf, was "presented from Sr Robt Ainslie, 5 June 1795", to the British Museum.

Another of Sestini's volumes is entitled Descriptio Numorum Veterum ex Museis Ainslie, Bellini, Bondacca, Borgia, Leipzig, 1796. Ainslie had been the 'Mæcenas' of Sestini's dedication of the Lettere e Dissertazioni of 1789; seven years later, in the preface to the Descriptio, he was a malignant speculator and trader in antiquities.

== Research and commissions ==
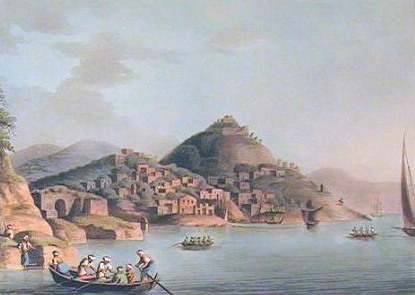
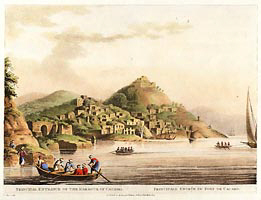
Paintings of present day Kaleköy (ancient Simena) at Kekova (Cacamo) by Luigi Mayer, commissioned by Ainslie during their excursion along the Turkish coast:

Ainslie's researches embraced antiquities of various kinds, objects of natural history, and illustrations of the East and its current life. Ainslie was a friend of important German orientalist artist Luigi Mayer and before departing Turkey travelled with him along the coast. He commissioned Mayer to produce drawings of many landmarks en route include the former settlements of ancient Lycia, such as The Harbor at Cacamo and ancient Telmessus (Fethiye). Mayer also drew other places in the Eastern Mediterranean and the Balkans for Ainslie and in his time visited Wallonia, the Ionian Islands and Egypt, all documented in his paintings. Three volumes of drawings were published, in the words of the dedication, 'under his auspices.' The first of these is entitled Views in Egypt, from the original drawings in possession of Sir Robert Ainslie, taken during his Embassy to Constantinople by Luigi Mayer; engraved by and under the direction of Thomas Milton; with historical Observations and incidental Illustrations of the Manners and Customs of the Natives of that Country, eleph. fol. London, 1801. This was followed by two bilingual volumes, English and French, entitled Views in the Ottoman Empire, chiefly in Caramania, &c., 1803; and Views in Palestine, &c., 1804. The coloured plates in these volumes are ninety-six in number; and fifty-four were afterwards given in the first edition, and seventy-one in the second edition, of Views in Turkey in Europe and Turkey in Asia, London, 1810. A selection from all these appeared in 1833 as a group of engravings, uncoloured and of smaller size, with the title of A Series of Twenty-four Views illustrative of the Holy Scriptures.

== Notes ==
Parliament of Great Britain
Preceded by Mark Wood; The Lord Muncaster	Member of Parliament for Milborne Port; 1796–1800; With: Lord Paget	Succeeded by Parliament of the United Kingdom
Parliament of the United Kingdom
Preceded by Parliament of Great Britain	Member of Parliament for Milborne Port; 1801–1802; With: Lord Paget	Succeeded by Lord Paget; Hugh Leycester
Baronetage of the United Kingdom
New creation	Baronet (of Great Torrington); 1804–1812	Succeeded by Robert Sharpe Ainslie
Diplomatic posts
Preceded by John Murray	British Ambassador to the Ottoman Empire; 1775–1793	Succeeded by Robert Liston
