= James Ainslie (cricketer) =

Australian cricketer

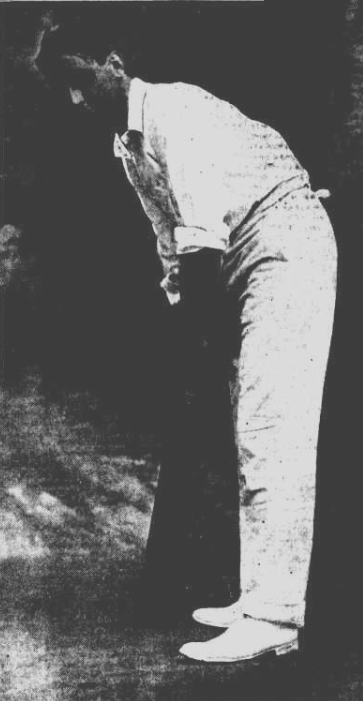

Personal information
- Born: 9 June 1880; Melbourne, Australia
- Died: 31 December 1953 (aged 73); St Kilda, Melbourne, Australia
- Batting: Right-handed
- Bowling: Right-arm fast-medium

Domestic team information
- Years: Team
- 1899/1900–1909/10: Victoria

Career statistics
Competition	First-class
Matches	9
Runs scored	455
Batting average	28.43
100s/50s	1/3
Top score	107*
Balls bowled	132
Wickets	2
Bowling average	32.50
5 wickets in innings	0
10 wickets in match	0
Best bowling	2/23
Catches/stumpings	8/–
- Source: Cricinfo, 8 November 2024

James Ainslie (9 June 1880 – 31 December 1953) was an Australian cricketer. He played nine first-class cricket matches for Victoria between 1900 and 1910.

A right-handed batsman and occasional bowler, Ainslie had his best first-class match when he scored 107 not out and 92 in Victoria's victory over Tasmania in February 1909. He died suddenly at home in the Melbourne suburb of St Kilda in December 1953, aged 73.
