= Ansley =

Ansley may refer to:

== Places ==
- Ansley, Warwickshire, in Warwickshire, England
- Ansley, Louisiana
- Ansley, Nebraska, in Nebraska, US
- Ansley Park, in Georgia, US
- Ansley Township, Custer County, Nebraska

== Names ==
- Ansley (given name)
- Ansley (surname)
