= Charles Nicholas Ainslie =

American entomologist (1856–1939)

Charles Nicholas Ainslie (October 13, 1856 – December 5, 1939) was an American entomologist who worked in the Bureau of Entomology.

Ainslie was born in Hagaman's Mills, New York to George (1824-1885) and Mary Jane Hagaman (1833-1861). His father was born in Roxburyshire, Scotland and worked as a Presbyterian missionary to the Choctaw Indians in Oklahoma before settling in Rochester, Minnesota where Charles received education at the local high school before joining Beloit College, Wisconsin and graduating AB (1877) and AM (1880). The Ainslies lived in a home of 100 acres and Charles became familiar with farm life. As a youth he observed the large flocks of passenger pigeon and their slaughter. He then went to work at a Rochester bank, still later the First National Bank, and married Ada Gooding in 1884. For some years he worked with Otto Lugger, examining the life of insects and collecting them. In 1906 he joined the US government service under F.M. Webster. He then worked on the life-histories of key pests such as the aphids of the central great plains, the New Mexico range caterpillar, the alfalfa weevil, and others. These involved travel to different parts of the US. He retired on October 31, 1930, but continued to work with the bureau of entomology.

Ainslie also took an interest in music, gardening, ornithology, and held a large library. He was also a musician and leader of the choir at the Congregational Church in Rochester as well as at the Rochester Symphony Orchestra. In 1938 he self-published an autobiography, At the Turn of a Century, of which only 527 copies were made. He died in Sioux City, survived by two sons, Arthur and Kenneth. The oldest son, George, who was also interested in entomology, predeceased him.
