= George Ainslie (British Army officer, died 1804) =

Former Scottish general in British army and lieutenant-governor of the Scilly Islands

General George Ainslie
- Born: Lanarkshire, Scotland
- Died: 7 July 1804
- Military career
- Allegiance: Kingdom of Great Britain
- Branch: British Army
- Rank: General

General George Ainslie was a Scottish general in the British Army, the Colonel of the 13th (1st Somersetshire) Regiment of Foot (appointed on the 5 June 1789), and lieutenant-governor of the Scilly Islands, who died on 7 July 1804.

He was a son of George Ainslie, Esq., the representative of the ancient Scottish family of Ainslie of Dolphinton in Lanarkshire, chief of the name, and Jane Ainslie, the daughter of Sir Philip Anstruther of Anstrutherfield. George and Jane Ainslie had seven children in total, including four daughters, three of whom were married and established in France.

The brothers of the younger George Ainslie were Sir Philip Ainslie, who was born in 1728 and died on 19 June 1802, and Sir Robert Ainslie, 1st Baronet, who was an ambassador to the Ottoman Empire (Ottoman Porte), orientalist and numismatist, and a Member of Parliament (MP) for the rotten borough of Milborne Port in Somerset between 1796 and 1802.

George Ainslie's grandson was Thomas Corbett (Lincolnshire MP).

Military offices
Preceded by Hon. James Murray	Colonel of the 13th (1st Somersetshire) Regiment of Foot; 1789–1804	Succeeded by Alexander Campbell
