= Ainslie baronets =

Extinct baronetcy in the Baronetage of the United Kingdom

Escutcheon of the Ainslie baronets of Great Torrington

The Ainslie baronetcy, of Great Torrington in the County of Lincoln, was a title in the Baronetage of the United Kingdom. It was created on 19 November 1804 for the Scottish diplomat Sir Robert Ainslie, with remainder to Robert Sharpe Ainslie, son of General George Ainslie, brother of the first Baronet. Robert Sharpe Ainslie succeeded in the baronetcy in 1812 according to the special remainder. He had previously represented Mitchell in Parliament. The title became extinct on his death in 1858.

== Ainslie baronets, of Great Torrington (1804) ==
- Sir Robert Ainslie, 1st Baronet (c. 1730–1812)
- Sir Robert Sharpe Ainslie, 2nd Baronet (1777–1858)

Baronetage of the United Kingdom
Preceded by Myers baronets	Ainslie baronets of Great Torrington; 19 November 1804	Succeeded by Burroughs baronets
