= List of MPs elected in the 1868 United Kingdom general election =

1868–1874 Parliament of the United Kingdom
←	1865–1868 Parliament	1874–1880 Parliament	→
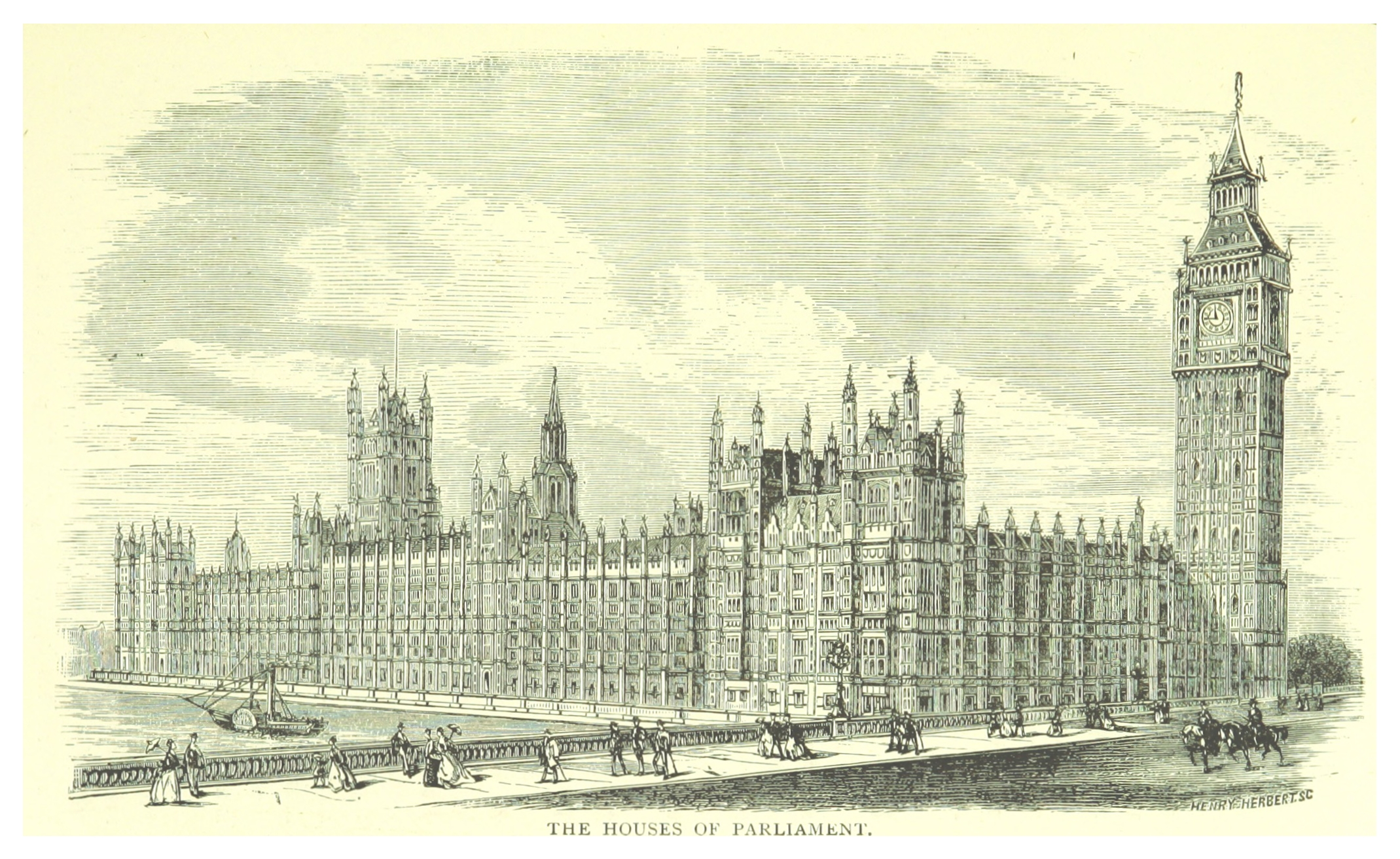
- The Palace of Westminster in 1873

Overview
- Legislative body: Parliament of the United Kingdom
- Jurisdiction: United Kingdom
- Meeting place: Palace of Westminster
- Term: 10 February 1869 – 26 January 1874
- Election: 1868 United Kingdom general election
- Government: First Gladstone ministry

House of Commons
- Members: 658
- Speaker: John Evelyn Denison (until 1872); Sir Henry Brand
- Leader: William Ewart Gladstone
- Prime Minister: William Ewart Gladstone
- Leader of the Opposition: Benjamin Disraeli
- Party control: Liberal Party

House of Lords
- Lord Chancellor: William Wood, 1st Baron Hatherley (until 1872); Roundell Palmer, 1st Earl of Selborne
- Leader: Granville Leveson-Gower, 2nd Earl Granville
- Leader of the Opposition: The Earl of Malmesbury (until 1868) The Lord Cairns (until 1869) The Duke of Richmond

Crown-in-Parliament Victoria

Sessions
- 1st: 10 December 1868 – 11 August 1869
- 2nd: 8 February 1870 – 10 August 1870
- 3rd: 9 February 1871 – 21 August 1871
- 4th: 6 February 1872 – 10 August 1872
- 5th: 6 February 1873 – 5 August 1873

This is a list of members of Parliament (MPs) elected in the 1868 general election.

Table of contents:

A B C D E F G H I J K L M N O P Q R S T U V W X Y Z By-elections Changes

== A ==
Constituency	MP	Party
Aberdeen	William Henry Sykes	Liberal
Aberdeenshire East	William Dingwall Fordyce	Liberal
Aberdeenshire West	William McCombie	Liberal
Abingdon	Hon. Charles Lindsay	Conservative
Andover	Hon. Dudley Fortescue	Liberal
Anglesey	Richard Davies	Liberal
Antrim (Two members)	Hon. Edward O'Neill	Conservative
Antrim (Two members)	Henry Seymour	Conservative
Argyllshire	The Marquess of Lorne	Liberal
Armagh	John Vance	Conservative
Armagh County (Two members)	Sir James Stronge, Bt	Conservative
Armagh County (Two members)	William Verner	Conservative
Ashton-under-Lyne	Thomas Walton Mellor	Conservative
Athlone	John Ennis	Liberal
Aylesbury (Two members)	Samuel George Smith	Conservative
Aylesbury (Two members)	Nathan Rothschild	Liberal
Ayr	Edward Craufurd	Liberal
Ayrshire North	William Finnie	Liberal
Ayrshire South	Sir David Wedderburn, Bt	Liberal
== B ==
Constituency	MP	Party
Banbury	Bernhard Samuelson	Liberal
Bandon	William Shaw	Liberal
Banffshire	Robert Duff	Liberal
Barnstaple (Two members)	Thomas Cave	Liberal
Barnstaple (Two members)	Charles Henry Williams	Conservative
Bath (Two members)	Sir William Tite	Liberal
Bath (Two members)	Donald Dalrymple	Liberal
Beaumaris	Hon. William Stanley	Liberal
Bedford (Two members)	Samuel Whitbread	Liberal
Bedford (Two members)	James Howard	Liberal
Bedfordshire (Two members)	Francis Russell	Liberal
Bedfordshire (Two members)	Richard Gilpin	Conservative
Belfast (Two members)	William Johnston	Conservative
Belfast (Two members)	Thomas McClure	Liberal
Berkshire (Three members)	Richard Benyon	Conservative
Berkshire (Three members)	Robert Loyd-Lindsay	Conservative
Berkshire (Three members)	John Walter	Liberal
Berwickshire	David Robertson	Liberal
Berwick-upon-Tweed (Two members)	Viscount Bury	Liberal
Berwick-upon-Tweed (Two members)	John Stapleton	Liberal
Beverley (Two members)	Sir Henry Edwards, Bt	Conservative
Beverley (Two members)	Edmund Hegan Kennard	Conservative
Bewdley	Sir Richard Atwood Glass	Conservative
Birkenhead	John Laird	Conservative
Birmingham (Three members)	John Bright	Liberal
Birmingham (Three members)	George Dixon	Liberal
Birmingham (Three members)	Philip Henry Muntz	Liberal
Blackburn (Two members)	William Henry Hornby	Conservative
Blackburn (Two members)	Joseph Feilden	Conservative
Bodmin	Hon. Frederick Leveson-Gower	Liberal
Bolton (Two members)	William Gray	Conservative
Bolton (Two members)	John Hick	Conservative
Boston (Two members)	John Malcolm	Conservative
Boston (Two members)	Thomas Collins	Conservative
Bradford (Two members)	William Edward Forster	Liberal
Bradford (Two members)	Henry Ripley	Liberal
Brecon	Howel Gwyn	Conservative
Breconshire	Hon. Godfrey Morgan	Conservative
Bridgnorth	Henry Whitmore	Conservative
Bridgwater (Two members)	Alexander William Kinglake	Liberal
Bridgwater (Two members)	Philip Vanderbyl	Liberal
Bridport	Thomas Alexander Mitchell	Liberal
Brighton (Two members)	James White	Liberal
Brighton (Two members)	Henry Fawcett	Liberal
Bristol (Two members)	Henry FitzHardinge Berkeley	Liberal
Bristol (Two members)	Samuel Morley	Liberal
Buckingham	Sir Harry Verney, Bt	Liberal
Buckinghamshire (Three members)	Caledon Du Pré	Conservative
Buckinghamshire (Three members)	Benjamin Disraeli	Conservative
Buckinghamshire (Three members)	Nathaniel Lambert	Liberal
Burnley	Richard Shaw	Liberal
Bury	Robert Needham Philips	Liberal
Bury St Edmunds (Two members)	Joseph Hardcastle	Liberal
Bury St Edmunds (Two members)	Edward Greene	Conservative
Buteshire	Charles Dalrymple	Conservative
== C ==
Constituency	MP	Party
Carnarvon	William Bulkeley Hughes	Liberal
Carnarvonshire	Love Jones-Parry	Liberal
Caithness	George Traill	Liberal
Calne	Lord Edmond FitzMaurice	Liberal
Cambridge (Two members)	Robert Torrens	Liberal
Cambridge (Two members)	William Fowler	Liberal
Cambridge University (Two members)	Spencer Horatio Walpole	Conservative
Cambridge University (Two members)	Alexander Beresford Hope	Conservative
Cambridgeshire (Three members)	Lord George Manners	Conservative
Cambridgeshire (Three members)	Viscount Royston	Conservative
Cambridgeshire (Three members)	Hon. Sir Henry Brand	Liberal
Canterbury (Two members)	Henry Munro-Butler-Johnstone	Conservative
Canterbury (Two members)	Theodore Brinckman	Liberal
Cardiff	James Crichton-Stuart	Liberal
Cardigan	Sir Thomas Lloyd, Bt	Liberal
Cardiganshire	Evan Richards	Liberal
Carlisle (Two members)	Edmund Potter	Liberal
Carlisle (Two members)	Sir Wilfrid Lawson, Bt	Liberal
Carlow	William Fagan	Liberal
County Carlow (Two members)	Henry Bruen	Conservative
County Carlow (Two members)	Arthur MacMurrough Kavanagh	Conservative
Carmarthen	John Cowell-Stepney	Liberal
Carmarthenshire (Two members)	Edward Sartoris	Liberal
Carmarthenshire (Two members)	John Jones	Conservative
Carrickfergus	Marriott Dalway	Conservative
Cashel	James O'Beirne	Liberal
Cavan (Two members)	Hon. Hugh Annesley	Conservative
Cavan (Two members)	Edward James Saunderson	Liberal
Chatham	Arthur Otway	Liberal
Chelsea (Two members)	Sir Charles Dilke, Bt	Liberal
Chelsea (Two members)	Sir Henry Hoare, Bt	Liberal
Cheltenham	Henry Samuelson	Liberal
Cheshire East (Two members)	Edward Egerton	Conservative
Cheshire East (Two members)	William Legh	Conservative
Cheshire Mid (Two members)	Hon. Wilbraham Egerton	Conservative
Cheshire Mid (Two members)	George Legh	Conservative
Cheshire West (Two members)	Sir Philip Grey Egerton, Bt	Conservative
Cheshire West (Two members)	John Tollemache	Conservative
Chester (Two members)	Earl Grosvenor	Liberal
Chester (Two members)	Henry Cecil Raikes	Conservative
Chichester	Lord Henry Lennox	Conservative
Chippenham	Gabriel Goldney	Conservative
Christchurch	Edmund Haviland-Burke	Liberal
Cirencester	Allen Bathurst	Conservative
Clackmannanshire and Kinross-shire	Sir William Patrick Adam	Liberal
Clare (Two members)	Crofton Moore Vandeleur	Conservative
Clare (Two members)	Sir Colman O'Loghlen, Bt	Liberal
Clitheroe	Ralph Assheton	Conservative
Clonmel	John Bagwell	Liberal
Cockermouth	Isaac Fletcher	Liberal
Colchester (Two members)	John Gurdon Rebow	Liberal
Colchester (Two members)	William Brewer	Liberal
Coleraine	Sir Henry Bruce, Bt	Conservative
Cork (Two members)	Nicholas Daniel Murphy	Liberal
Cork (Two members)	John Maguire	Liberal
County Cork (Two members)	Arthur Smith-Barry	Liberal
County Cork (Two members)	McCarthy Downing	Liberal
Cornwall East (Two members)	Sir John Salusbury-Trelawny, Bt	Liberal
Cornwall East (Two members)	Edward Brydges Willyams	Liberal
Cornwall West	Sir John St Aubyn, Bt	Liberal
Cornwall West	Arthur Vivian	Liberal
Coventry (Two members)	Henry Eaton	Conservative
Coventry (Two members)	Alexander Staveley Hill	Conservative
Cricklade (Two members)	Sir Daniel Gooch, Bt	Conservative
Cricklade (Two members)	Hon. Frederick William Cadogan	Liberal
Cumberland East (Two members)	Hon. Charles Howard	Liberal
Cumberland East (Two members)	William Nicholson Hodgson	Conservative
Cumberland West (Two members)	Henry Lowther	Conservative
Cumberland West (Two members)	Hon. Percy Wyndham	Conservative
== D ==
Constituency	MP	Party
Darlington	Edmund Backhouse	Liberal
Denbigh Boroughs	Watkin Williams	Liberal
Denbighshire (Two members)	Sir Watkin Williams-Wynn, Bt	Conservative
Denbighshire (Two members)	George Osborne Morgan	Liberal
Derby (Two members)	Michael Thomas Bass	Liberal
Derby (Two members)	Samuel Plimsoll	Liberal
Derbyshire East (Two members)	Hon. Francis Egerton	Liberal
Derbyshire East (Two members)	Hon. Henry Strutt	Liberal
Derbyshire North (Two members)	Lord George Cavendish	Liberal
Derbyshire North (Two members)	Augustus Arkwright	Conservative
Derbyshire South (Two members)	Rowland Smith	Conservative
Derbyshire South (Two members)	Sir Thomas Gresley, Bt	Conservative
Devizes	Sir Thomas Bateson, Bt	Conservative
Devonport (Two members)	Montague Chambers	Liberal
Devonport (Two members)	John Delaware Lewis	Liberal
Devonshire East (Two members)	Sir Lawrence Palk, Bt	Conservative
Devonshire East (Two members)	Lord Courtenay	Conservative
Devonshire North (Two members)	Thomas Dyke Acland	Liberal
Devonshire North (Two members)	Sir Stafford Northcote, Bt	Conservative
Devonshire South (Two members)	Samuel Trehawke Kekewich	Conservative
Devonshire South (Two members)	Sir Massey Lopes, Bt	Conservative
Dewsbury	Sir John Simon	Liberal
Donegal (Two members)	Thomas Conolly	Conservative
Donegal (Two members)	Marquis of Hamilton	Conservative
Dorchester	Charles Sturt	Conservative
Dorset (Three members)	Henry Sturt	Conservative
Dorset (Three members)	Hon. Henry Portman	Liberal
Dorset (Three members)	John Floyer	Conservative
Dover (Two members)	Alexander George Dickson	Conservative
Dover (Two members)	George Jessel	Liberal
Down (Two members)	Lord Edwin Hill-Trevor	Conservative
Down (Two members)	William Brownlow Forde	Conservative
Downpatrick	William Keown	Conservative
Drogheda	Benjamin Whitworth	Liberal
Droitwich	Sir John Pakington, Bt	Conservative
Dublin (Two members)	Jonathan Pim	Liberal
Dublin (Two members)	Sir Arthur Guinness, Bt	Conservative
County Dublin (Two members)	Thomas Edward Taylor	Conservative
County Dublin (Two members)	Ion Hamilton	Conservative
Dublin University (Two members)	Anthony Lefroy	Conservative
Dublin University (Two members)	John Thomas Ball	Conservative
Dudley	Henry Brinsley Sheridan	Liberal
Dumfries	Robert Jardine	Liberal
Dumfriesshire	Sydney Waterlow	Liberal
Dunbartonshire	Archibald Orr-Ewing	Conservative
Dundalk	Philip Callan	Liberal
Dundee (Two members)	Sir John Ogilvy, Bt	Liberal
Dundee (Two members)	George Armitstead	Liberal
Dungannon	William Knox	Conservative
Dungarvon	Henry Matthews	Liberal
Durham City (Two members)	John Henderson	Liberal
Durham City (Two members)	John Robert Davison	Liberal
Durham County North (Two members)	Sir Hedworth Williamson, Bt	Liberal
Durham County North (Two members)	George Elliot	Conservative
Durham County South	Joseph Pease	Liberal
Durham County South	Frederick Beaumont	Liberal
== E ==
Constituency	MP	Party
East Retford (Two members)	The Viscount Galway	Conservative
East Retford (Two members)	Francis Foljambe	Liberal
Edinburgh (Two members)	Duncan McLaren	Liberal
Edinburgh (Two members)	John Miller	Liberal
Edinburgh and St Andrews Universities	Lyon Playfair	Liberal
Elgin	M. E. Grant Duff	Liberal
Elginshire and Nairnshire	Hon. James Ogilvy-Grant	Conservative
Ennis	William Stacpoole	Liberal
Enniskillen	John Crichton	Conservative
Essex East (Two members)	James Round	Conservative
Essex East (Two members)	Samuel Ruggles-Brise	Conservative
Essex South (Two members)	Richard Wingfield-Baker	Liberal
Essex South (Two members)	Andrew Johnston	Liberal
Essex West (Two members)	Lord Eustace Cecil	Conservative
Essex West (Two members)	Henry Selwin-Ibbetson	Conservative
Evesham	James Bourne	Conservative
Exeter (Two members)	John Coleridge	Liberal
Exeter (Two members)	Edgar Alfred Bowring	Liberal
Eye	George Barrington	Conservative
== F ==
Constituency	MP	Party
Falkirk Burghs	James Merry	Liberal
Fermanagh (Two members)	Mervyn Edward Archdale	Conservative
Fermanagh (Two members)	Hon. Henry Cole	Conservative
Fife	Sir Robert Anstruther, Bt	Liberal
Finsbury (Two members)	William McCullagh Torrens	Liberal
Finsbury (Two members)	Andrew Lusk	Liberal
Flint	Sir John Hanmer, Bt	Liberal
Flintshire	Richard Grosvenor	Liberal
Forfarshire	Charles Carnegie	Liberal
Frome	Thomas Hughes	Liberal
== G ==
Constituency	MP	Party
Galway Borough (Two members)	Sir Rowland Blennerhassett, Bt	Liberal
Galway Borough (Two members)	Viscount St Lawrence	Liberal
County Galway (Two members)	William Henry Gregory	Liberal
County Galway (Two members)	Viscount Bourke	Liberal
Gateshead	Sir William Hutt	Liberal
Glamorganshire (Two members)	Christopher Rice Mansel Talbot	Liberal
Glamorganshire (Two members)	Henry Vivian	Liberal
Glasgow (Three members)	Robert Dalglish	Liberal
Glasgow (Three members)	William Graham	Liberal
Glasgow (Three members)	George Anderson	Liberal
Glasgow and Aberdeen Universities	James Moncreiff	Liberal
Gloucester (Two members)	William Philip Price	Liberal
Gloucester (Two members)	Charles James Monk	Liberal
Gloucestershire East (Two members)	Robert Stayner Holford	Conservative
Gloucestershire East (Two members)	Sir Michael Hicks Beach, Bt	Conservative
Gloucestershire West (Two members)	Robert Kingscote	Liberal
Gloucestershire West (Two members)	Samuel Marling	Liberal
Grantham (Two members)	Frederick Tollemache	Liberal
Grantham (Two members)	Sir Hugh Cholmeley, Bt	Liberal
Gravesend	Sir Charles John Wingfield	Liberal
Great Grimsby	George Tomline	Liberal
Great Marlow	Thomas Owen Wethered	Conservative
Greenock	James Grieve	Liberal
Greenwich (Two members)	David Salomons	Liberal
Greenwich (Two members)	William Ewart Gladstone	Liberal
Guildford	Guildford Onslow	Liberal
== H ==
Constituency	MP	Party
Hackney (Two members)	Sir Charles Reed	Liberal
Hackney (Two members)	John Holms	Liberal
Haddington	Sir Henry Ferguson-Davie, Bt	Liberal
Haddingtonshire	Lord Elcho	Conservative
Halifax (Two members)	Sir James Stansfeld	Liberal
Halifax (Two members)	Edward Akroyd	Liberal
Hampshire North (Two members)	William Wither Bramston Beach	Conservative
Hampshire North (Two members)	George Sclater-Booth	Conservative
Hampshire South (Two members)	Hon. William Cowper-Temple	Liberal
Hampshire South (Two members)	Lord Henry Douglas-Scott-Montagu	Conservative
The Hartlepools	Ralph Ward Jackson	Conservative
Harwich	Henry Jervis-White-Jervis	Conservative
Hastings (Two members)	Thomas Brassey	Liberal
Hastings (Two members)	Frederick North	Liberal
Haverfordwest	The Lord Kensington	Liberal
Hawick	George Trevelyan	Liberal
Helston	Adolphus William Young	Liberal
Hereford (Two members)	George Clive	Liberal
Hereford (Two members)	John Wyllie	Liberal
Herefordshire (Three members)	Sir Joseph Bailey, Bt	Conservative
Herefordshire (Three members)	Michael Biddulph	Liberal
Herefordshire (Three members)	Sir Herbert Croft, Bt	Conservative
Hertford	Robert Dimsdale	Conservative
Hertfordshire (Three members)	Henry Cowper	Liberal
Hertfordshire (Three members)	Abel Smith	Conservative
Hertfordshire (Three members)	Henry Brand	Liberal
Horsham	Robert Henry Hurst	Liberal
Huddersfield	Edward Leatham	Liberal
Huntingdon	Thomas Baring	Conservative
Huntingdonshire (Two members)	Edward Fellowes	Conservative
Huntingdonshire (Two members)	Lord Robert Montagu	Conservative
Hythe	Mayer Amschel de Rothschild	Liberal
== I ==
Constituency	MP	Party
Inverness Burghs	Aeneas William Mackintosh	Liberal
Inverness-shire	Donald Cameron	Conservative
Ipswich (Two members)	Hugh Adair	Liberal
Ipswich (Two members)	Henry Wyndham West	Liberal
Isle of Wight	Sir John Simeon, Bt	Liberal
== K ==
Constituency	MP	Party
Kendal	John Whitwell	Liberal
Kent East (Two members)	Edward Leigh Pemberton	Conservative
Kent East (Two members)	Hon. George Milles	Conservative
Kent Mid (Two members)	William Hart Dyke	Conservative
Kent Mid (Two members)	Viscount Holmesdale	Conservative
Kent West (Two members)	Sir Charles Mills, Bt	Conservative
Kent West (Two members)	John Gilbert Talbot	Conservative
Kerry (Two members)	Viscount Castlerosse	Liberal
Kerry (Two members)	Henry Arthur Herbert	Liberal
Kidderminster	Thomas Lea	Liberal
Kildare (Two members)	William H. F. Cogan	Liberal
Kildare (Two members)	Lord Otho FitzGerald	Liberal
Kilkenny City	Sir John Gray	Liberal
County Kilkenny (Two members)	Leopold Agar-Ellis	Liberal
County Kilkenny (Two members)	George Leopold Bryan	Liberal
Kilmarnock Burghs	Hon. Edward Pleydell-Bouverie	Liberal
Kincardineshire	James Dyce Nicol	Liberal
King's County (Two members)	Sir Patrick O'Brien, Bt	Liberal
King's County (Two members)	David Sherlock	Liberal
King's Lynn (Two members)	Edward Stanley	Conservative
King's Lynn (Two members)	Hon. Robert Bourke	Conservative
Kingston upon Hull (Two members)	James Clay	Liberal
Kingston upon Hull (Two members)	Charles Morgan Norwood	Liberal
Kinsale	Sir George Colthurst, Bt	Liberal
Kirkcaldy Burghs	Roger Sinclair Aytoun	Liberal
Kirkcudbright	Wellwood Herries Maxwell	Liberal
Knaresborough	Alfred Illingworth	Liberal
== L ==
Constituency	MP	Party
Lambeth (Two members)	Sir James Lawrence, Bt	Liberal
Lambeth (Two members)	William McArthur	Liberal
Lanarkshire North	Sir Thomas Colebrooke, Bt	Liberal
Lanarkshire South	John Hamilton	Liberal
Lancashire North (Two members)	John Wilson-Patten	Conservative
Lancashire North (Two members)	Hon. Frederick Stanley	Conservative
Lancashire North-East (Two members)	James Maden Holt	Conservative
Lancashire North-East (Two members)	John Pierce Chamberlain Starkie	Conservative
Lancashire South-East (Two members)	Hon. Algernon Egerton	Conservative
Lancashire South-East (Two members)	John Snowdon Henry	Conservative
Lancashire South-West (Two members)	Charles Turner	Conservative
Lancashire South-West (Two members)	R. A. Cross	Conservative
Launceston	Henry Lopes	Conservative
Leeds (Three members)	Edward Baines	Liberal
Leeds (Three members)	Robert Meek Carter	Liberal
Leeds (Three members)	William St James Wheelhouse	Conservative
Leicester (Two members)	Peter Alfred Taylor	Liberal
Leicester (Two members)	John Dove Harris	Liberal
Leicestershire North (Two members)	John Manners	Conservative
Leicestershire North (Two members)	Samuel Clowes	Conservative
Leicestershire South (Two members)	George Curzon	Conservative
Leicestershire South (Two members)	Albert Pell	Conservative
Leith Burghs	Robert Andrew Macfie	Liberal
Leitrim (Two members)	John Brady	Liberal
Leitrim (Two members)	William Ormsby-Gore	Conservative
Leominster	Richard Arkwright	Conservative
Lewes	Walter Pelham	Liberal
Lichfield	Richard Dyott	Conservative
Limerick City (Two members)	Francis William Russell	Liberal
Limerick City (Two members)	George Gavin	Liberal
County Limerick (Two members)	William Monsell	Liberal
County Limerick (Two members)	Edward Synan	Liberal
Lincoln (Two members)	Charles Seely	Liberal
Lincoln (Two members)	John Hinde Palmer	Liberal
Lincolnshire Mid (Two members)	Weston Cracroft Amcotts	Liberal
Lincolnshire Mid (Two members)	Henry Chaplin	Conservative
Lincolnshire North (Two members)	Sir Montague Cholmeley, Bt	Liberal
Lincolnshire North (Two members)	Rowland Winn	Conservative
Lincolnshire South (Two members)	William Welby-Gregory	Conservative
Lincolnshire South (Two members)	Edmund Turnor	Conservative
Linlithgowshire	Peter McLagan	Liberal
Lisburne	Edward Wingfield Verner	Conservative
Liskeard	Sir Arthur William Buller	Liberal
Liverpool (Three members)	Samuel Robert Graves	Conservative
Liverpool (Three members)	Viscount Sandon	Conservative
Liverpool (Three members)	William Rathbone	Liberal
City of London (Four members)	Robert Wigram Crawford	Liberal
City of London (Four members)	George Goschen	Liberal
City of London (Four members)	William Lawrence	Liberal
City of London (Four members)	Charles Bell	Conservative
London University	Robert Lowe	Liberal
Londonderry	Richard Dowse	Liberal
Londonderry County (Two members)	Robert Peel Dawson	Conservative
Londonderry County (Two members)	Sir Frederic Heygate, Bt	Conservative
Longford (Two members)	Fulke Greville-Nugent	Liberal
Longford (Two members)	Myles O'Reilly	Liberal
Louth County (Two members)	Chichester Fortescue	Liberal
Louth County (Two members)	Matthew Dease	Liberal
Ludlow	George Windsor-Clive	Conservative
Lymington	Lord George Gordon-Lennox	Conservative
== M ==
Constituency	MP	Party
Macclesfield (Two members)	David Chadwick	Liberal
Macclesfield (Two members)	William Brocklehurst	Liberal
Maidstone (Two members)	William Lee	Liberal
Maidstone (Two members)	James Whatman	Liberal
Maldon	Edward Hammond Bentall	Liberal
Mallow	Edward Sullivan	Liberal
Malmesbury	Walter Powell	Conservative
Malton	Hon. Charles Wentworth-FitzWilliam	Liberal
Manchester (Three members)	Sir Thomas Bazley, Bt	Liberal
Manchester (Three members)	Jacob Bright	Liberal
Manchester (Three members)	Hugh Birley	Conservative
Marlborough	Lord Ernest Brudenell-Bruce	Liberal
Marylebone (Two members)	John Harvey Lewis	Liberal
Marylebone (Two members)	Sir Thomas Chambers	Liberal
Mayo (Two members)	Charles Bingham	Conservative
Mayo (Two members)	George Henry Moore	Liberal
Meath (Two members)	Matthew Corbally	Liberal
Meath (Two members)	Edward McEvoy	Liberal
Merioneth	David Williams	Liberal
Merthyr Tydvil (Two members)	Henry Richard	Liberal
Merthyr Tydvil (Two members)	Richard Fothergill	Liberal
Middlesbrough	Henry Bolckow	Liberal
Middlesex (Two members)	Viscount Enfield	Liberal
Middlesex (Two members)	Lord George Hamilton	Conservative
Midhurst	William Townley Mitford	Conservative
Midlothian	Sir Alexander Ramsay-Gibson-Maitland, Bt	Liberal
Monaghan (Two members)	Charles Powell Leslie	Conservative
Monaghan (Two members)	Sewallis Shirley	Conservative
Monmouth	Sir John Ramsden, Bt	Liberal
Monmouthshire (Two members)	Octavius Morgan	Conservative
Monmouthshire (Two members)	Poulett Somerset	Conservative
Montgomery	Hon. Charles Hanbury-Tracy	Liberal
Montgomeryshire	Charles Williams-Wynn	Conservative
Montrose	William Edward Baxter	Liberal
Morpeth	Sir George Grey, Bt	Liberal
== N ==
Constituency	MP	Party
Newark (Two members)	Grosvenor Hodgkinson	Liberal
Newark (Two members)	Edward Denison	Liberal
Newcastle-under-Lyme (Two members)	William Shepherd Allen	Liberal
Newcastle-under-Lyme (Two members)	Edmund Buckley	Conservative
Newcastle-upon-Tyne (Two members)	Thomas Emerson Headlam	Liberal
Newcastle-upon-Tyne (Two members)	Sir Joseph Cowen	Liberal
Newport (Isle of Wight)	Charles Wykeham Martin	Liberal
New Ross	Patrick McMahon	Liberal
Newry	William Kirk	Liberal
New Shoreham (Two members)	Stephen Cave	Conservative
New Shoreham (Two members)	Sir Percy Burrell, Bt	Conservative
Norfolk North (Two members)	Frederick Walpole	Conservative
Norfolk North (Two members)	Sir Edmund Lacon, Bt	Conservative
Norfolk South (Two members)	Clare Sewell Read	Conservative
Norfolk South (Two members)	Edward Howes	Conservative
Norfolk West (Two members)	Sir William Bagge, Bt	Conservative
Norfolk West (Two members)	Hon. Thomas de Grey	Conservative
Northallerton	John Hutton	Conservative
Northampton (Two members)	Charles Gilpin	Liberal
Northampton (Two members)	The Lord Henley	Liberal
Northamptonshire North (Two members)	George Ward Hunt	Conservative
Northamptonshire North (Two members)	Sackville Stopford-Sackville	Conservative
Northamptonshire South (Two members)	Sir Rainald Knightley, Bt	Conservative
Northamptonshire South (Two members)	Fairfax Cartwright	Conservative
Northumberland North (Two members)	The Earl Percy	Conservative
Northumberland North (Two members)	Sir Matthew White Ridley, Bt	Conservative
Northumberland South (Two members)	Wentworth Beaumont	Liberal
Northumberland South (Two members)	Hon. Henry Liddell	Conservative
Norwich (Two members)	Sir William Russell, Bt	Liberal
Norwich (Two members)	Sir Henry Stracey, Bt	Conservative
Nottingham (Two members)	Robert Juckes Clifton	Liberal
Nottingham (Two members)	Charles Ichabod Wright	Conservative
Nottinghamshire North (Two members)	Evelyn Denison	Liberal (Speaker)
Nottinghamshire North (Two members)	Frederick Chatfield Smith	Conservative
Nottinghamshire South (Two members)	William Hodgson Barrow	Conservative
Nottinghamshire South (Two members)	Thomas Thoroton-Hildyard	Conservative
== O ==
Constituency	MP	Party
Oldham (Two members)	J. T. Hibbert	Liberal
Oldham (Two members)	John Platt	Liberal
Orkney and Shetland	Frederick Dundas	Liberal
Oxford (Two members)	Edward Cardwell	Liberal
Oxford (Two members)	Sir William Vernon Harcourt	Liberal
Oxfordshire (Three members)	Joseph Warner Henley	Conservative
Oxfordshire (Three members)	John North	Conservative
Oxfordshire (Three members)	William Cornwallis Cartwright	Liberal
Oxford University (Two members)	Gathorne Gathorne-Hardy	Conservative
Oxford University (Two members)	John Mowbray	Conservative
== P ==
Constituency	MP	Party
Paisley	Humphrey Crum-Ewing	Liberal
Peebles and Selkirk	Sir Graham Graham-Montgomery, Bt	Conservative
Pembroke	Thomas Meyrick	Conservative
Pembrokeshire	John Scourfield	Conservative
Penryn and Falmouth (Two members)	Robert Fowler	Conservative
Penryn and Falmouth (Two members)	Edward Eastwick	Conservative
Perth	Hon. Arthur Kinnaird	Liberal
Perthshire	Charles Stuart Parker	Liberal
Peterborough (Two members)	George Hammond Whalley	Liberal
Peterborough (Two members)	William Wells	Liberal
Petersfield	William Nicholson	Liberal
Plymouth (Two members)	Sir Robert Collier	Liberal
Plymouth (Two members)	Walter Morrison	Liberal
Pontefract	Hugh Childers	Liberal
Pontefract	Samuel Waterhouse	Conservative
Poole	Arthur Guest	Conservative
Portarlington	Lionel Dawson-Damer	Conservative
Portsmouth (Two members)	William Stone	Liberal
Portsmouth (Two members)	Sir James Dalrymple-Horn-Elphinstone, Bt	Conservative
Preston (Two members)	Sir Thomas Fermor-Hesketh, Bt	Conservative
Preston (Two members)	Edward Hermon	Conservative
== Q ==
Constituency	MP	Party
Queen's County (Two members)	John FitzPatrick	Liberal
Queen's County (Two members)	Kenelm Thomas Digby	Liberal
== R ==
Constituency	MP	Party
Radnor	Richard Green-Price	Liberal
Radnorshire	Hon. Arthur Walsh	Conservative
Reading (Two members)	Sir Francis Goldsmid, Bt	Liberal
Reading (Two members)	George Shaw-Lefevre	Liberal
Renfrewshire	Archibald Alexander Speirs	Liberal
Richmond (Yorkshire)	Sir Roundell Palmer	Liberal
Ripon	John Hay	Liberal
Rochdale	Thomas Bayley Potter	Liberal
Rochester (Two members)	Philip Wykeham Martin	Liberal
Rochester (Two members)	John Alexander Kinglake	Liberal
Roscommon (Two members)	Fitzstephen French	Liberal
Roscommon (Two members)	Charles Owen O'Conor	Liberal
Ross and Cromarty	Alexander Matheson	Liberal
Roxburghshire	Sir William Scott, Bt	Liberal
Rutland (Two members)	Hon. Gerard Noel	Conservative
Rutland (Two members)	George Finch	Conservative
Rye	John Gathorne-Hardy	Conservative
== S ==
Constituency	MP	Party
St Andrews	Edward Ellice	Liberal
St Ives	Charles Magniac	Liberal
Salford (Two members)	Charles Edward Cawley	Conservative
Salford (Two members)	William Thomas Charley	Conservative
Salisbury (Two members)	Edward Hamilton	Liberal
Salisbury (Two members)	John Alfred Lush	Liberal
Sandwich (Two members)	Edward Knatchbull-Hugessen	Liberal
Sandwich (Two members)	Henry Brassey	Liberal
Scarborough (Two members)	John Dent	Liberal
Scarborough (Two members)	Sir Harcourt Vanden-Bempde-Johnstone, Bt	Liberal
Shaftesbury	George Glyn	Liberal
Sheffield (Two members)	George Hadfield	Liberal
Sheffield (Two members)	A. J. Mundella	Liberal
Shrewsbury (Two members)	William James Clement	Liberal
Shrewsbury (Two members)	James Figgins	Conservative
Shropshire North (Two members)	John Ormsby-Gore	Conservative
Shropshire North (Two members)	Viscount Newport	Conservative
Shropshire South (Two members)	Hon. Sir Percy Egerton Herbert	Conservative
Shropshire South (Two members)	Edward Corbett	Conservative
Sligo	Lawrence E. Knox	Conservative
County Sligo (Two members)	Sir Robert Gore-Booth, Bt	Conservative
County Sligo (Two members)	Denis Maurice O'Conor	Liberal
Somerset East (Two members)	Ralph Shuttleworth Allen	Conservative
Somerset East (Two members)	Richard Bright	Conservative
Somerset Mid (Two members)	Sir Richard Paget, Bt	Conservative
Somerset Mid (Two members)	Ralph Neville-Grenville	Conservative
Somerset West (Two members)	William Gore-Langton	Conservative
Somerset West (Two members)	Hon. Arthur Hood	Conservative
Southampton (Two members)	Russell Gurney	Conservative
Southampton (Two members)	Peter Merrick Hoare	Conservative
South Shields	James Cochran Stevenson	Liberal
Southwark (Two members)	John Locke	Liberal
Southwark (Two members)	Austen Henry Layard	Liberal
Stafford (Two members)	Walter Meller	Conservative
Stafford (Two members)	Henry Pochin	Liberal
Staffordshire East (Two members)	Michael Bass	Liberal
Staffordshire East (Two members)	John Robinson McClean	Liberal
Staffordshire North (Two members)	Charles Adderley	Conservative
Staffordshire North (Two members)	Sir Edward Manningham-Buller, Bt	Liberal
Staffordshire West (Two members)	Sir Smith Child, Bt	Conservative
Staffordshire West (Two members)	Hugo Meynell-Ingram	Conservative
Stalybridge	James Sidebottom	Conservative
Stamford	Sir John Dalrymple-Hay, Bt	Conservative
Stirling	Henry Campbell-Bannerman	Liberal
Stirlingshire	John Erskine	Liberal
Stockport (Two members)	John Benjamin Smith	Liberal
Stockport (Two members)	William Tipping	Conservative
Stockton	Joseph Dodds	Liberal
Stoke-upon-Trent (Two members)	George Melly	Liberal
Stoke-upon-Trent (Two members)	William Sargeant Roden	Liberal
Stroud (Two members)	Henry Winterbotham	Liberal
Stroud (Two members)	Sebastian Dickinson	Liberal
Suffolk East (Two members)	Hon. John Henniker-Major	Conservative
Suffolk East (Two members)	Frederick Snowdon Corrance	Conservative
Suffolk West (Two members)	William Parker	Conservative
Suffolk West (Two members)	Lord Augustus Hervey	Conservative
Sunderland (Two members)	John Candlish	Liberal
Sunderland (Two members)	Sir Edward Temperley Gourley	Liberal
Surrey East (Two members)	Hon. Peter King	Liberal
Surrey East (Two members)	Charles Buxton	Liberal
Surrey Mid (Two members)	Henry Peek	Conservative
Surrey Mid (Two members)	Hon. William Brodrick	Conservative
Surrey West (Two members)	John Ivatt Briscoe	Liberal
Surrey West (Two members)	George Cubitt	Conservative
Sussex East (Two members)	John George Dodson	Liberal
Sussex East (Two members)	George Burrow Gregory	Conservative
Sussex West (Two members)	Walter Barttelot	Conservative
Sussex West (Two members)	Henry Wyndham	Conservative
Sutherland	Lord Ronald Gower	Liberal
Swansea District	Lewis Llewelyn Dillwyn	Liberal
== T ==
Constituency	MP	Party
Tamworth (Two members)	Sir Robert Peel, Bt	Liberal
Tamworth (Two members)	Sir Henry Bulwer	Liberal
Taunton (Two members)	Alexander Charles Barclay	Liberal
Taunton (Two members)	Edward William Cox	Conservative
Tavistock	Lord Arthur Russell	Liberal
Tewkesbury	William Edwin Price	Liberal
Thirsk	Sir William Payne-Gallwey, Bt	Conservative
Tipperary (Two members)	Charles Moore	Liberal
Tipperary (Two members)	Charles William White	Liberal
Tiverton (Two members)	George Denman	Liberal
Tiverton (Two members)	John Heathcoat-Amory	Liberal
Tower Hamlets (Two members)	Acton Smee Ayrton	Liberal
Tower Hamlets (Two members)	Joseph d'Aguilar Samuda	Liberal
Tralee	Daniel O'Donoghue	Liberal
Truro (Two members)	Sir Frederick Williams, Bt	Conservative
Truro (Two members)	John Vivian	Liberal
Tynemouth and North Shields	Thomas Eustace Smith	Liberal
Tyrone (Two members)	Hon. Henry Lowry-Corry	Conservative
Tyrone (Two members)	Lord Claud Hamilton	Conservative
== W ==
Constituency	MP	Party
Wakefield	Somerset Beaumont	Liberal
Wallingford	Stanley Vickers	Conservative
Walsall	Charles Forster	Liberal
Wareham	John Calcraft	Liberal
Warrington	Peter Rylands	Liberal
Warwick (Two members)	Arthur Peel	Liberal
Warwick (Two members)	Edward Greaves	Conservative
Warwickshire North (Two members)	Charles Newdigate Newdegate	Conservative
Warwickshire North (Two members)	William Bromley-Davenport	Conservative
Warwickshire South (Two members)	Henry Christopher Wise	Conservative
Warwickshire South (Two members)	John Hardy	Conservative
Waterford City (Two members)	John Aloysius Blake	Liberal
Waterford City (Two members)	James Delahunty	Liberal
County Waterford (Two members)	Sir John Esmonde, Bt	Liberal
County Waterford (Two members)	Edmond de la Poer	Liberal
Wednesbury	Alexander Brogden	Liberal
Wenlock (Two members)	Hon. George Weld-Forester	Conservative
Wenlock (Two members)	Alexander Brown	Liberal
Westbury	John Lewis Phipps	Conservative
Westmeath (Two members)	William Pollard-Urquhart	Liberal
Westmeath (Two members)	Algernon Greville	Liberal
Westminster (Two members)	Hon. Robert Grosvenor	Liberal
Westminster (Two members)	William Smith	Conservative
Westmorland (Two members)	The Earl of Bective	Conservative
Westmorland (Two members)	William Lowther	Conservative
Wexford	Richard Devereux	Liberal
County Wexford (Two members)	John Power	Liberal
County Wexford (Two members)	Matthew D'Arcy	Liberal
Weymouth and Melcombe Regis (Two members)	Henry Edwards	Liberal
Weymouth and Melcombe Regis (Two members)	Charles J. T. Hambro	Conservative
Whitby	William Henry Gladstone	Liberal
Whitehaven	George Cavendish-Bentinck	Conservative
Wick District	George Loch	Liberal
Wicklow (Two members)	William Dick	Conservative
Wicklow (Two members)	Henry Wentworth-FitzWilliam	Liberal
Wigan (Two members)	Henry Woods	Liberal
Wigan (Two members)	John Lancaster	Liberal
Wigtown Burghs	George Young	Liberal
Wigtownshire	Lord Garlies	Conservative
Wilton	Sir Edmund Antrobus, Bt	Liberal
Wiltshire North (Two members)	Lord Charles Bruce	Liberal
Wiltshire North (Two members)	Sir George Jenkinson, Bt	Conservative
Wiltshire South (Two members)	Lord Henry Thynne	Conservative
Wiltshire South (Two members)	Thomas Grove	Liberal
Winchester (Two members)	John Bonham-Carter	Liberal
Winchester (Two members)	William Barrow Simonds	Conservative
Windsor	Roger Eykyn	Liberal
Wolverhampton (Two members)	Hon. Charles Pelham Villiers	Liberal
Wolverhampton (Two members)	Thomas Matthias Weguelin	Liberal
Woodstock	Henry Barnett	Conservative
Worcester (Two members)	Alexander Clunes Sheriff	Liberal
Worcester (Two members)	William Laslett	Conservative
Worcestershire East (Two members)	Hon. Charles Lyttelton	Liberal
Worcestershire East (Two members)	Richard Amphlett	Conservative
Worcestershire West (Two members)	Frederick Knight	Conservative
Worcestershire West (Two members)	William Edward Dowdeswell	Conservative
Wycombe	Hon. William Carington	Liberal
== Y ==
Constituency	MP	Party
York (Two members)	James Lowther	Conservative
York (Two members)	Joshua Westhead	Liberal
Yorkshire East Riding (Two members)	Christopher Sykes	Conservative
Yorkshire East Riding (Two members)	William Harrison-Broadley	Conservative
Yorkshire North Riding (Two members)	Frederick Milbank	Liberal
Yorkshire North Riding (Two members)	Hon. Octavius Duncombe	Conservative
Yorkshire West Riding East (Two members)	Christopher Beckett Denison	Conservative
Yorkshire West Riding East (Two members)	Joshua Fielden	Conservative
Yorkshire West Riding North (Two members)	Sir Francis Crossley, Bt	Liberal
Yorkshire West Riding North (Two members)	Lord Frederick Cavendish	Liberal
Yorkshire West Riding South (Two members)	Henry Frederick Beaumont	Liberal
Yorkshire West Riding South (Two members)	William Wentworth-FitzWilliam, Viscount Milton	Liberal
Youghal	Christopher Weguelin	Liberal

== See also ==
- UK general election, 1868
- List of parliaments of the United Kingdom
