= List of MPs elected in the 1874 United Kingdom general election =

1874–1880 Parliament of the United Kingdom
←	1868–1874 Parliament	1880–1885 Parliament	→
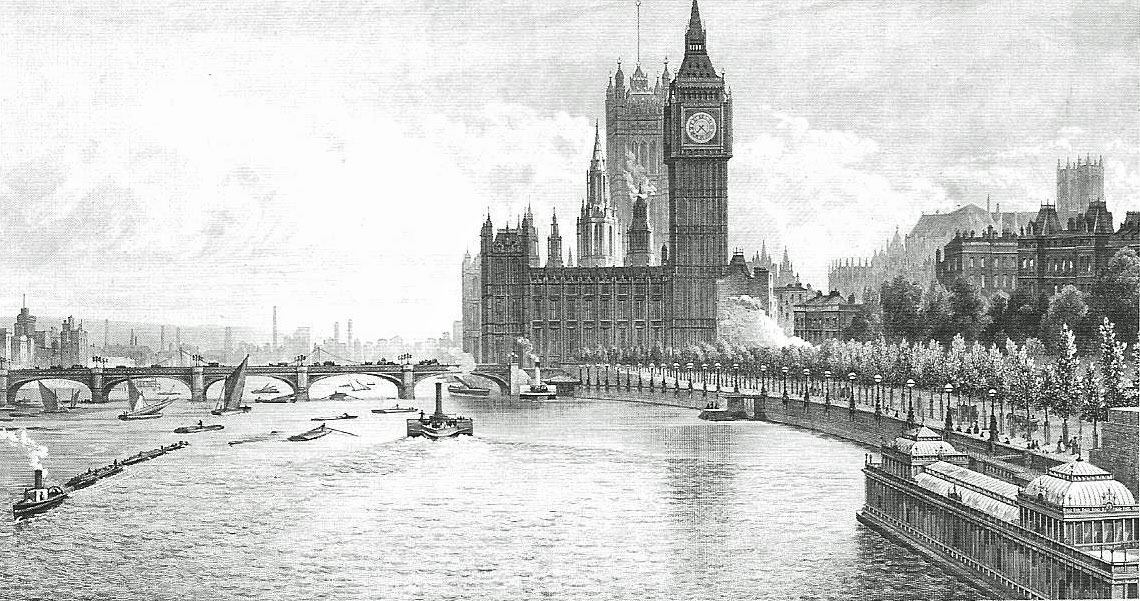
- The Palace of Westminster in 1876

Overview
- Legislative body: Parliament of the United Kingdom
- Jurisdiction: United Kingdom
- Meeting place: Palace of Westminster
- Term: 5 March 1874 – 24 March 1880
- Election: 1874 United Kingdom general election
- Government: Second Disraeli ministry

House of Commons
- Members: 652
- Speaker: Sir Henry Brand
- Leader: Benjamin Disraeli (until 1876); Stafford Northcote
- Prime Minister: Benjamin Disraeli
- Leader of the Opposition: William Ewart Gladstone (until 1875); Marquess of Hartington
- Third-party leader: Isaac Butt (until 1879); William Shaw
- Party control: Conservative Party

House of Lords
- Lord Chancellor: Hugh Cairns, 1st Earl Cairns
- Leader: Benjamin Disraeli, 1st Earl of Beaconsfield)
- Leader of the Opposition: The Earl Granville

Crown-in-Parliament Victoria

Sessions
- 1st: 5 March 1874 – 7 August 1874
- 2nd: 5 February 1875 – 13 August 1875
- 3rd: 8 February 1876 – 15 August 1876
- 4th: 8 February 1877 – 14 August 1877
- 5th: 17 January 1878 – 16 August 1878
- 6th: 5 December 1878 – 15 August 1879
- 7th: 5 February 1880 – 24 March 1880

This is a list of members of Parliament (MPs) elected in the 1874 general election.

Table of contents:

A B C D E F G H I J K L M N O P Q R S T U V W X Y Z By-elections Changes

== A ==
Constituency	MP	Party
Aberdeen	John Farley Leith	Liberal
Aberdeenshire East	William Dingwall Fordyce	Liberal
Aberdeenshire West	William McCombie	Liberal
Abingdon	John Creemer Clarke	Liberal
Andover	Henry Wellesley	Conservative
Anglesey	Richard Davies	Liberal
Antrim (Two members)	Hon. Edward O'Neill	Conservative
Antrim (Two members)	James Chaine	Conservative
Argyllshire	The Marquess of Lorne	Liberal
Armagh	John Vance	Conservative
Armagh County (Two members)	Edward Wingfield Verner	Conservative
Armagh County (Two members)	Maxwell Close	Conservative
Ashton-under-Lyne	Thomas Walton Mellor	Conservative
Athlone	Edward Sheil	Home Rule League
Aylesbury (Two members)	Samuel George Smith	Conservative
Aylesbury (Two members)	Nathan Rothschild	Liberal
Ayr Burghs	Sir William Montgomery-Cuninghame, Bt	Conservative
Ayrshire North	Roger Montgomerie	Conservative
Ayrshire South	Claud Alexander	Conservative
== B ==
Constituency	MP	Party
Banbury	Bernhard Samuelson	Liberal
Bandon	Alexander Swanston	Liberal
Banffshire	Robert Duff	Liberal
Barnstaple (Two members)	Thomas Cave	Liberal
Barnstaple (Two members)	Samuel Danks Waddy	Liberal
Bath (Two members)	Arthur Hayter	Liberal
Bath (Two members)	Nathaniel Bousfield	Conservative
Beaumaris	Morgan Lloyd	Liberal
Bedford (Two members)	Samuel Whitbread	Liberal
Bedford (Two members)	Frederick Polhill-Turner	Conservative
Bedfordshire (Two members)	Richard Gilpin	Conservative
Bedfordshire (Two members)	Francis Bassett	Liberal
Belfast (Two members)	William Johnston	Conservative
Belfast (Two members)	James Corry	Conservative
Berkshire (Three members)	Richard Benyon	Conservative
Berkshire (Three members)	Robert Loyd-Lindsay	Conservative
Berkshire (Three members)	John Walter	Liberal
Berwickshire	Hon. Robert Baillie-Hamilton	Conservative
Berwick-upon-Tweed (Two members)	Dudley Marjoribanks	Liberal
Berwick-upon-Tweed (Two members)	David Milne Home	Conservative
Bewdley	Charles Harrison	Liberal
Birkenhead	John Laird	Conservative
Birmingham (Three members)	John Bright	Liberal
Birmingham (Three members)	George Dixon	Liberal
Birmingham (Three members)	Philip Henry Muntz	Liberal
Blackburn (Two members)	Henry Feilden	Conservative
Blackburn (Two members)	William Edward Briggs	Liberal
Bodmin	Hon. Frederick Leveson-Gower	Liberal
Bolton (Two members)	John Hick	Conservative
Bolton (Two members)	John Kynaston Cross	Liberal
Boston (Two members)	William Ingram	Liberal
Boston (Two members)	Thomas Parry	Liberal
Bradford (Two members)	William Edward Forster	Liberal
Bradford (Two members)	Henry Ripley	Liberal
Brecon	James Gwynne-Holford	Conservative
Breconshire	Hon. Godfrey Morgan	Conservative
Bridgnorth	William Henry Foster	Conservative
Bridport	Thomas Alexander Mitchell	Liberal
Brighton (Two members)	James Lloyd Ashbury	Conservative
Brighton (Two members)	Charles Cameron Shute	Conservative
Bristol (Two members)	Samuel Morley	Liberal
Bristol (Two members)	Kirkman Daniel Hodgson	Liberal
Buckingham	Egerton Hubbard	Conservative
Buckinghamshire (Three members)	Benjamin Disraeli	Conservative
Buckinghamshire (Three members)	Nathaniel Lambert	Liberal
Buckinghamshire (Three members)	Sir Robert Harvey, Bt	Conservative
Burnley	Richard Shaw	Liberal
Bury	Robert Needham Philips	Liberal
Bury St Edmunds (Two members)	Edward Greene	Conservative
Bury St Edmunds (Two members)	Lord Francis Hervey	Conservative
Buteshire	Charles Dalrymple	Conservative
== C ==
Constituency	MP	Party
Caithness	Sir John Sinclair, Bt	Liberal
Calne	Lord Edmond Fitzmaurice	Liberal
Cambridge (Two members)	Alfred Marten	Conservative
Cambridge (Two members)	Patrick Boyle Smollett	Conservative
Cambridge University (Two members)	Spencer Horatio Walpole	Conservative
Cambridge University (Two members)	Alexander Beresford Hope	Conservative
Cambridgeshire (Three members)	Lord George Manners	Conservative
Cambridgeshire (Three members)	Hon. Sir Henry Brand	Liberal
Cambridgeshire (Three members)	Hon. Eliot Yorke	Conservative
Canterbury (Two members)	Henry Munro-Butler-Johnstone	Conservative
Canterbury (Two members)	Lewis Majendie	Conservative
Cardiff	James Crichton-Stuart	Liberal
Cardigan	David Davies	Liberal
Cardiganshire	Thomas Edward Lloyd	Conservative
Carlisle (Two members)	Sir Wilfrid Lawson, Bt	Liberal
Carlisle (Two members)	Robert Ferguson	Liberal
Carlow	Henry Owen Lewis	Home Rule League
County Carlow (Two members)	Henry Bruen	Conservative
County Carlow (Two members)	Arthur MacMurrough Kavanagh	Conservative
Carmarthen	Charles William Nevill	Conservative
Carmarthenshire (Two members)	John Jones	Conservative
Carmarthenshire (Two members)	Viscount Emlyn	Conservative
Carnarvon	William Bulkeley Hughes	Liberal
Carnarvonshire	George Douglas-Pennant	Conservative
Carrickfergus	Marriott Dalway	Conservative
Cavan (Two members)	Charles Joseph Fay	Home Rule League
Cavan (Two members)	Joseph Biggar	Home Rule League
Chatham	George Elliot	Conservative
Chelsea (Two members)	Sir Charles Dilke, Bt	Liberal
Chelsea (Two members)	William Gordon	Conservative
Cheltenham	Sir James Agg-Gardner	Conservative
Cheshire East (Two members)	William Legh	Conservative
Cheshire East (Two members)	William Cunliffe Brooks	Conservative
Cheshire Mid (Two members)	Hon. Wilbraham Egerton	Conservative
Cheshire Mid (Two members)	Egerton Leigh	Conservative
Cheshire West (Two members)	Sir Philip Grey Egerton, Bt	Conservative
Cheshire West (Two members)	Wilbraham Tollemache	Conservative
Chester (Two members)	Henry Cecil Raikes	Conservative
Chester (Two members)	John George Dodson	Liberal
Chichester	Lord Henry Lennox	Conservative
Chippenham	Gabriel Goldney	Conservative
Christchurch	Sir Henry Drummond Wolff	Conservative
Cirencester	Allen Bathurst	Conservative
Clackmannanshire and Kinross-shire	Sir William Patrick Adam	Liberal
Clare (Two members)	Sir Colman O'Loghlen, Bt	Home Rule League
Clare (Two members)	Lord Francis Conyngham	Home Rule League
Clitheroe	Ralph Assheton	Conservative
Clonmel	Arthur John Moore	Home Rule League
Cockermouth	Isaac Fletcher	Liberal
Colchester (Two members)	Alexander Learmonth	Conservative
Colchester (Two members)	Herbert Mackworth-Praed	Conservative
Coleraine	Daniel Taylor	Liberal
Cork (Two members)	Nicholas Daniel Murphy	Home Rule League
Cork (Two members)	Joseph Philip Ronayne	Home Rule League
County Cork (Two members)	McCarthy Downing	Home Rule League
County Cork (Two members)	William Shaw	Home Rule League
Cornwall East (Two members)	Sir Colman Rashleigh, Bt	Liberal
Cornwall East (Two members)	John Tremayne	Conservative
Cornwall West	Sir John St Aubyn, Bt	Liberal
Cornwall West	Arthur Vivian	Liberal
Coventry (Two members)	Henry Eaton	Conservative
Coventry (Two members)	Henry Jackson	Liberal
Cricklade (Two members)	Sir Daniel Gooch, Bt	Conservative
Cricklade (Two members)	Ambrose Goddard	Conservative
Cumberland East (Two members)	Hon. Charles Howard	Liberal
Cumberland East (Two members)	William Nicholson Hodgson	Conservative
Cumberland West (Two members)	Hon. Percy Wyndham	Conservative
Cumberland West (Two members)	The Lord Muncaster	Conservative
== D ==
Constituency	MP	Party
Darlington	Edmund Backhouse	Liberal
Denbigh Boroughs	Watkin Williams	Liberal
Denbighshire (Two members)	Sir Watkin Williams-Wynn, Bt	Conservative
Denbighshire (Two members)	George Osborne Morgan	Liberal
Derby (Two members)	Michael Thomas Bass	Liberal
Derby (Two members)	Samuel Plimsoll	Liberal
Derbyshire East (Two members)	Hon. Francis Egerton	Liberal
Derbyshire East (Two members)	Francis Arkwright	Conservative
Derbyshire North (Two members)	Lord George Cavendish	Liberal
Derbyshire North (Two members)	Augustus Arkwright	Conservative
Derbyshire South (Two members)	Sir Henry Wilmot, Bt	Conservative
Derbyshire South (Two members)	William Evans	Liberal
Devizes	Sir Thomas Bateson, Bt	Conservative
Devonport (Two members)	Sir John Henry Puleston	Conservative
Devonport (Two members)	George Edward Price	Conservative
Devonshire East (Two members)	Sir Lawrence Palk, Bt	Conservative
Devonshire East (Two members)	Sir John Kennaway, Bt	Conservative
Devonshire North (Two members)	Sir Thomas Dyke Acland, Bt	Liberal
Devonshire North (Two members)	Sir Stafford Northcote, Bt	Conservative
Devonshire South (Two members)	Sir Massey Lopes, Bt	Conservative
Devonshire South (Two members)	John Carpenter Garnier	Conservative
Dewsbury	Sir John Simon	Liberal
Donegal (Two members)	Thomas Conolly	Conservative
Donegal (Two members)	Viscount Hamilton	Conservative
Dorchester	William Brymer	Conservative
Dorset (Three members)	Henry Sturt	Conservative
Dorset (Three members)	Hon. Henry Portman	Liberal
Dorset (Three members)	John Floyer	Conservative
Dover (Two members)	Alexander George Dickson	Conservative
Dover (Two members)	Charles Freshfield	Conservative
Down (Two members)	Lord Edwin Hill-Trevor	Conservative
Down (Two members)	James Sharman Crawford	Liberal
Downpatrick	John Mulholland	Conservative
Drogheda	William Hagarty O'Leary	Home Rule League
Droitwich	John Corbett	Liberal
Dublin (Two members)	Sir Arthur Guinness, Bt	Conservative
Dublin (Two members)	Maurice Brooks	Home Rule League
County Dublin (Two members)	Thomas Edward Taylor	Conservative
County Dublin (Two members)	Ion Hamilton	Conservative
Dublin University	John Thomas Ball	Conservative
Dublin University	Hon. David Plunket	Conservative
Dudley	Henry Brinsley Sheridan	Liberal
Dumfries	Ernest Noel	Liberal
Dumfriesshire	John Hope-Johnstone	Conservative
Dunbartonshire	Archibald Orr-Ewing	Conservative
Dundalk	Philip Callan	Home Rule League
Dundee (Two members)	James Yeaman	Liberal
Dundee (Two members)	Edward Jenkins	Liberal
Dungannon	Thomas Alexander Dickson	Liberal
Dungarvon	John O'Keeffe	Home Rule League
Durham City (Two members)	John Henderson	Liberal
Durham City (Two members)	Thomas Thompson	Liberal
Durham County North (Two members)	Lowthian Bell	Liberal
Durham County North (Two members)	Charles Palmer	liberal
Durham County South	Joseph Pease	Liberal
Durham County South	Frederick Beaumont	Liberal
== E ==
Constituency	MP	Party
East Retford (Two members)	The Viscount Galway	Conservative
East Retford (Two members)	Francis Foljambe	Liberal
Edinburgh (Two members)	Duncan McLaren	Liberal
Edinburgh (Two members)	James Cowan	Liberal
Edinburgh and St Andrews Universities	Lyon Playfair	Liberal
Elgin	M. E. Grant Duff	Liberal
Elginshire and Nairnshire	Viscount Macduff	Liberal
Ennis	William Stacpoole	Home Rule League
Enniskillen	John Crichton	Conservative
Essex East (Two members)	James Round	Conservative
Essex East (Two members)	Samuel Ruggles-Brise	Conservative
Essex South (Two members)	Thomas Charles Baring	Conservative
Essex South (Two members)	William Makins	Conservative
Essex West (Two members)	Lord Eustace Cecil	Conservative
Essex West (Two members)	Sir Henry Selwin-Ibbetson, Bt	Conservative
Evesham	James Bourne	Conservative
Exeter (Two members)	Arthur Mills	Conservative
Exeter (Two members)	John George Johnson	Conservative
Eye	George Barrington	Conservative
== F ==
Constituency	MP	Party
Falkirk Burghs	John Ramsay	Liberal
Fermanagh (Two members)	Hon. Henry Cole	Conservative
Fermanagh (Two members)	William Humphrys Archdall	Conservative
Fife	Sir Robert Anstruther, Bt	Liberal
Finsbury (Two members)	William McCullagh Torrens	Liberal
Finsbury (Two members)	Andrew Lusk	Liberal
Flint	P. Ellis Eyton	Liberal
Flintshire	Richard Grosvenor	Liberal
Forfarshire	James William Barclay	Liberal
Frome	Henry Lopes	Conservative
== G ==
Constituency	MP	Party
Galway Borough (Two members)	Viscount St Lawrence	Home Rule League
Galway Borough (Two members)	George Morris	Home Rule League
County Galway (Two members)	Mitchell Henry	Home Rule League
County Galway (Two members)	John Philip Nolan	Home Rule League
Gateshead	William Hutt	Liberal
Glamorganshire (Two members)	Christopher Rice Mansel Talbot	Liberal
Glamorganshire (Two members)	Henry Vivian	Liberal
Glasgow (Three members)	George Anderson	Liberal
Glasgow (Three members)	Charles Cameron	Liberal
Glasgow (Three members)	Alexander Whitelaw	Conservative
Glasgow and Aberdeen Universities	Edward Gordon	Conservative
Gloucester (Two members)	Charles James Monk	Liberal
Gloucester (Two members)	William Killigrew Wait	Conservative
Gloucestershire East (Two members)	Sir Michael Hicks Beach, Bt	Conservative
Gloucestershire East (Two members)	John Yorke	Conservative
Gloucestershire West (Two members)	Robert Kingscote	Liberal
Gloucestershire West (Two members)	Hon. Randal Plunkett	Conservative
Grantham (Two members)	Sir Hugh Cholmeley, Bt	Liberal
Grantham (Two members)	Henry Cust	Conservative
Gravesend	Bedford Pim	Conservative
Great Grimsby	John Chapman	Conservative
Great Marlow	Thomas Owen Wethered	Conservative
Greenock	James Grieve	Liberal
Greenwich (Two members)	William Ewart Gladstone	Liberal
Greenwich (Two members)	Thomas Boord	Conservative
Guildford	Denzil Onslow	Conservative
== H ==
Constituency	MP	Party
Hackney (Two members)	John Holms	Liberal
Hackney (Two members)	Charles Reed	Liberal
Haddington	Sir Henry Ferguson-Davie, Bt	Liberal
Haddingtonshire	Lord Elcho	Conservative
Halifax (Two members)	Sir James Stansfeld	Liberal
Halifax (Two members)	John Crossley	Liberal
Hampshire North (Two members)	William Wither Bramston Beach	Conservative
Hampshire North (Two members)	George Sclater-Booth	Conservative
Hampshire South (Two members)	Hon. William Cowper-Temple	Liberal
Hampshire South (Two members)	Lord Henry Douglas-Scott-Montagu	Conservative
The Hartlepools	Thomas Richardson	Liberal
Harwich	Henry Jervis-White-Jervis	Conservative
Hastings (Two members)	Thomas Brassey	Liberal
Hastings (Two members)	Sir Ughtred Kay-Shuttleworth, Bt	Liberal
Haverfordwest	The Lord Kensington	Liberal
Hawick	George Trevelyan	Liberal
Helston	Adolphus William Young	Liberal
Hereford (Two members)	Evan Pateshall	Conservative
Hereford (Two members)	George Clive	Liberal
Herefordshire (Three members)	Sir Joseph Bailey, Bt	Conservative
Herefordshire (Three members)	Michael Biddulph	Liberal
Herefordshire (Three members)	Daniel Peploe	Conservative
Hertford	Arthur Balfour	Conservative
Hertfordshire (Three members)	Henry Cowper	Liberal
Hertfordshire (Three members)	Abel Smith	Conservative
Hertfordshire (Three members)	Frederick Halsey	Conservative
Horsham	Sir William Vesey-FitzGerald	Conservative
Huddersfield	Edward Leatham	Liberal
Huntingdon	Sir John Burgess Karslake	Conservative
Huntingdonshire (Two members)	Edward Fellowes	Conservative
Huntingdonshire (Two members)	Sir Henry Pelly	Conservative
Hythe	Edward Watkin	Liberal
== I ==
Constituency	MP	Party
Inverness Burghs	Charles Fraser-Mackintosh	Liberal
Inverness-shire	Donald Cameron	Conservative
Ipswich (Two members)	John Cobbold	Conservative
Ipswich (Two members)	James Redfoord Bulwer	Conservative
Isle of Wight	Alexander Baillie-Cochrane	Conservative
== K ==
Constituency	MP	Party
Kendal	John Whitwell	Liberal
Kent East (Two members)	Edward Leigh Pemberton	Conservative
Kent East (Two members)	Hon. George Milles	Conservative
Kent Mid (Two members)	William Hart Dyke	Conservative
Kent Mid (Two members)	Viscount Holmesdale	Conservative
Kent West (Two members)	Sir Charles Mills, Bt	Conservative
Kent West (Two members)	John Gilbert Talbot	Conservative
Kerry (Two members)	Henry Arthur Herbert	Liberal
Kerry (Two members)	Rowland Ponsonby Blennerhassett	Home Rule League
Kidderminster	Albert Grant	Conservative
Kildare (Two members)	William H. F. Cogan	Liberal
Kildare (Two members)	Charles Henry Meldon	Home Rule League
Kilkenny City	Sir John Gray	Home Rule League
County Kilkenny (Two members)	George Leopold Bryan	Home Rule League
County Kilkenny (Two members)	Patrick Martin	Home Rule League
Kilmarnock Burghs	James Fortescue Harrison	Liberal
Kincardineshire	Sir George Balfour	Liberal
King's County (Two members)	Sir Patrick O'Brien, Bt	Home Rule League
King's County (Two members)	David Sherlock	Home Rule League
King's Lynn (Two members)	Hon. Robert Bourke	Conservative
King's Lynn (Two members)	Lord Claud Hamilton	Conservative
Kingston upon Hull (Two members)	Charles Morgan Norwood	Liberal
Kingston upon Hull (Two members)	Charles Wilson	Liberal
Kinsale	Eugene Collins	Home Rule League
Kirkcaldy	Robert Reid	Liberal
Kirkcudbright	John Maitland	Liberal
Knaresborough	Basil Thomas Woodd	Conservative
== L ==
Constituency	MP	Party
Lambeth (Two members)	Sir James Lawrence, Bt	Liberal
Lambeth (Two members)	William McArthur	Liberal
Lanarkshire North	Sir Thomas Colebrooke, Bt	Liberal
Lanarkshire South	Sir Windham Carmichael-Anstruther, Bt	Conservative
Lancashire North (Two members)	Hon. Frederick Stanley	Conservative
Lancashire North (Two members)	John Wilson-Patten	Conservative
Lancashire North-East (Two members)	James Maden Holt	Conservative
Lancashire North-East (Two members)	John Starkie	Conservative
Lancashire South-East (Two members)	Hon. Algernon Egerton	Conservative
Lancashire South-East (Two members)	Edward Hardcastle	Conservative
Lancashire South-West (Two members)	Charles Turner	Conservative
Lancashire South-West (Two members)	R. A. Cross	Conservative
Launceston	James Deakin	Conservative
Leeds (Three members)	Robert Meek Carter	Liberal
Leeds (Three members)	William St James Wheelhouse	Conservative
Leeds (Three members)	Robert Tennant	Conservative
Leicester (Two members)	Peter Alfred Taylor	Liberal
Leicester (Two members)	Alexander McArthur	Liberal
Leicestershire North (Two members)	Lord John Manners	Conservative
Leicestershire North (Two members)	Samuel Clowes	Conservative
Leicestershire South (Two members)	Albert Pell	Conservative
Leicestershire South (Two members)	William Unwin Heygate	Conservative
Leith Burghs	Donald Robert Macgregor	Liberal
Leitrim (Two members)	John Brady	Home Rule League
Leitrim (Two members)	William Ormsby-Gore	Conservative
Leominster	Richard Arkwright	Conservative
Lewes	William Christie	Conservative
Lichfield	Richard Dyott	Conservative
Limerick City (Two members)	Isaac Butt	Home Rule League
Limerick City (Two members)	Richard O'Shaughnessy	Home Rule League
County Limerick (Two members)	Edward John Synan	Home Rule League
County Limerick (Two members)	William Henry O'Sullivan	Home Rule League
Lincoln (Two members)	Charles Seely	Liberal
Lincoln (Two members)	Edward Chaplin	Conservative
Lincolnshire Mid (Two members)	Henry Chaplin	Conservative
Lincolnshire Mid (Two members)	Hon. Edward Stanhope	Conservative
Lincolnshire North (Two members)	Rowland Winn	Conservative
Lincolnshire North (Two members)	Sir John Dugdale Astley, Bt	Conservative
Lincolnshire South (Two members)	William Welby-Gregory	Conservative
Lincolnshire South (Two members)	Edmund Turnor	Conservative
Linlithgowshire	Peter McLagan	Liberal
Lisburne	Sir Richard Wallace, Bt	Conservative
Liskeard	Edward Horsman	Liberal
Liverpool (Three members)	Viscount Sandon	Conservative
Liverpool (Three members)	William Rathbone	Liberal
Liverpool (Three members)	John Torr	Conservative
City of London (Four members)	George Goschen	Liberal
City of London (Four members)	William Cotton	Conservative
City of London (Four members)	Philip Twells	Conservative
City of London (Four members)	John Hubbard	Conservative
London University	Robert Lowe	Liberal
Londonderry	Charles Lewis	Conservative
Londonderry County (Two members)	Richard Smyth	Liberal
Londonderry County (Two members)	Hugh Law	Liberal
Longford (Two members)	Myles O'Reilly	Home Rule League
Longford (Two members)	George Errington	Home Rule League
Louth County (Two members)	Alexander Martin Sullivan	Home Rule League
Louth County (Two members)	Philip Callan	Home Rule League
Ludlow	George Windsor-Clive	Conservative
Lymington	Edmund Hegan Kennard	Conservative
== M ==
Constituency	MP	Party
Macclesfield (Two members)	David Chadwick	Liberal
Macclesfield (Two members)	William Brocklehurst	Liberal
Maidstone (Two members)	Sir John Lubbock, Bt	Liberal
Maidstone (Two members)	Sir Sydney Waterlow, Bt	Liberal
Maldon	George Sandford	Conservative
Mallow	John George MacCarthy	Home Rule League
Malmesbury	Walter Powell	Conservative
Malton	Charles Wentworth-Fitzwilliam	Liberal
Manchester (Three members)	Sir Thomas Bazley, Bt	Liberal
Manchester (Three members)	Hugh Birley	Conservative
Manchester (Three members)	William Romaine Callender	Conservative
Marlborough	Lord Ernest Brudenell-Bruce	Liberal
Marylebone (Two members)	Sir Thomas Chambers	Liberal
Marylebone (Two members)	William Forsyth	Conservative
Mayo (Two members)	George Ekins Browne	Home Rule League
Mayo (Two members)	Thomas Tighe	Home Rule League
Meath (Two members)	John Martin	Home Rule League
Meath (Two members)	Nicholas Ennis	Home Rule League
Merioneth	Samuel Holland	Liberal
Merthyr Tydvil (Two members)	Henry Richard	Liberal
Merthyr Tydvil (Two members)	Richard Fothergill	Liberal
Middlesbrough	Henry Bolckow	Liberal
Middlesex (Two members)	Lord George Hamilton	Conservative
Middlesex (Two members)	Octavius Coope	Conservative
Midhurst	Charles Perceval	Conservative
Midlothian	The Earl of Dalkeith	Conservative
Monaghan (Two members)	Sewallis Shirley	Conservative
Monaghan (Two members)	John Leslie	Conservative
Monmouth Boroughs	Thomas Cordes	Conservative
Monmouthshire (Two members)	Lord Henry Somerset	Conservative
Monmouthshire (Two members)	Frederick Courtenay Morgan	Conservative
Montgomery	Hon. Charles Hanbury-Tracy	Liberal
Montgomeryshire	Charles Williams-Wynn	Conservative
Montrose	William Edward Baxter	Liberal
Morpeth	Thomas Burt	Liberal
== N ==
Constituency	MP	Party
Newark (Two members)	Samuel Bristowe	Liberal
Newark (Two members)	Thomas Earp	Liberal
Newcastle-under-Lyme (Two members)	William Shepherd Allen	Liberal
Newcastle-under-Lyme (Two members)	Sir Edmund Buckley, Bt	Conservative
Newcastle-upon-Tyne (Two members)	Joseph Cowen	Liberal
Newcastle-upon-Tyne (Two members)	Charles Hamond	Conservative
Newport (Isle of Wight)	Charles Clifford	Liberal
New Ross	John Dunbar	Home Rule League
Newry	William Whitworth	Liberal
New Shoreham (Two members)	Stephen Cave	Conservative
New Shoreham (Two members)	Sir Percy Burrell, Bt	Conservative
Norfolk North (Two members)	Frederick Walpole	Conservative
Norfolk North (Two members)	Sir Edmund Lacon, Bt	Conservative
Norfolk South (Two members)	Clare Sewell Read	Conservative
Norfolk South (Two members)	Sir Robert Buxton, Bt	Conservative
Norfolk West (Two members)	Sir William Bagge, Bt	Conservative
Norfolk West (Two members)	George Bentinck	Conservative
Northallerton	George Elliot	Conservative
Northampton (Two members)	Charles Gilpin	Liberal
Northampton (Two members)	Pickering Phipps	Conservative
Northamptonshire North (Two members)	George Ward Hunt	Conservative
Northamptonshire North (Two members)	Sackville Stopford-Sackville	Conservative
Northamptonshire South (Two members)	Sir Rainald Knightley, Bt	Conservative
Northamptonshire South (Two members)	Fairfax Cartwright	Conservative
Northumberland North (Two members)	The Earl Percy	Conservative
Northumberland North (Two members)	Sir Matthew White Ridley, Bt	Conservative
Northumberland South (Two members)	Wentworth Beaumont	Liberal
Northumberland South (Two members)	Lord Eslington	Conservative
Norwich (Two members)	Jeremiah Colman	Liberal
Norwich (Two members)	John Walter Huddleston	Conservative
Nottingham (Two members)	William Evelyn Denison	Conservative
Nottingham (Two members)	Saul Isaac	Conservative
Nottinghamshire North (Two members)	Frederick Chatfield Smith	Conservative
Nottinghamshire North (Two members)	Hon. George Monckton-Arundel	Conservative
Nottinghamshire South (Two members)	Thomas Thoroton-Hildyard	Conservative
Nottinghamshire South (Two members)	George Storer	Conservative
== O ==
Constituency	MP	Party
Oldham (Two members)	John Cobbett	Conservative
Oldham (Two members)	Frederick Spinks	Conservative
Orkney and Shetland	Samuel Laing	Liberal
Oxford (Two members)	Sir William Vernon Harcourt	Liberal
Oxford (Two members)	Edward Cardwell	Liberal
Oxfordshire (Three members)	J. W. Henley	Conservative
Oxfordshire (Three members)	John North	Conservative
Oxfordshire (Three members)	William Cornwallis Cartwright	Liberal
Oxford University (Two members)	Gathorne Gathorne-Hardy	Conservative
Oxford University (Two members)	John Mowbray	Conservative
== P ==
Constituency	MP	Party
Paisley	William Holms	Liberal
Peebles and Selkirk	Sir Graham Graham-Montgomery, Bt	Conservative
Pembroke	Edward Reed	Liberal
Pembrokeshire	John Scourfield	Conservative
Penryn and Falmouth (Two members)	David James Jenkins	Liberal
Penryn and Falmouth (Two members)	Henry Thomas Cole	Liberal
Perth	Hon. Arthur Kinnaird	Liberal
Perthshire	Sir William Stirling-Maxwell, Bt	Conservative
Peterborough (Two members)	George Hammond Whalley	Liberal
Peterborough (Two members)	Thomson Hankey	Liberal
Petersfield	William Sydney Hylton Jolliffe	Conservative
Plymouth (Two members)	Edward Bates	Conservative
Plymouth (Two members)	Sampson Lloyd	Conservative
Pontefract	Hugh Childers	Liberal
Pontefract	Samuel Waterhouse	Conservative
Poole	Charles Waring	Liberal
Portarlington	Lionel Dawson-Damer	Conservative
Portsmouth (Two members)	Sir James Dalrymple-Horn-Elphinstone, Bt	Conservative
Portsmouth (Two members)	Thomas Charles Bruce	Conservative
Preston (Two members)	Edward Hermon	Conservative
Preston (Two members)	Sir John Holker	Conservative
== Q ==
Constituency	MP	Party
Queen's County (Two members)	Kenelm Thomas Digby	Home Rule League
Queen's County (Two members)	Edmund Dease	Home Rule League
== R ==
Constituency	MP	Party
Radnor	The Marquess of Hartington	Liberal
Radnorshire	Hon. Arthur Walsh	Conservative
Reading (Two members)	Sir Francis Goldsmid, Bt	Liberal
Reading (Two members)	George Shaw-Lefevre	Liberal
Renfrewshire	William Mure	Liberal
Richmond (Yorkshire)	John Dundas	Liberal
Ripon	The Earl De Grey	Liberal
Rochdale	Thomas Bayley Potter	Liberal
Rochester (Two members)	Philip Wykeham Martin	Liberal
Rochester (Two members)	Julian Goldsmid	Liberal
Roscommon (Two members)	Charles Owen O'Conor	Home Rule League
Roscommon (Two members)	Charles French	Home Rule League
Ross and Cromarty	Alexander Matheson	Liberal
Roxburghshire	Sir George Scott-Douglas, Bt	Conservative
Rutland (Two members)	Hon. Gerard Noel	Conservative
Rutland (Two members)	George Finch	Conservative
Rye	John Gathorne-Hardy	Conservative
== S ==
Constituency	MP	Party
St Andrews	Edward Ellice	Liberal
St Ives	Edward Davenport	Conservative
Salford (Two members)	Charles Edward Cawley	Conservative
Salford (Two members)	William Thomas Charley	Conservative
Salisbury (Two members)	John Alfred Lush	Liberal
Salisbury (Two members)	Granville Ryder	Conservative
Sandwich (Two members)	Edward Knatchbull-Hugessen	Liberal
Sandwich (Two members)	Henry Brassey	Liberal
Scarborough (Two members)	Sir Harcourt Vanden-Bempde-Johnstone, Bt	Liberal
Scarborough (Two members)	Sir Charles Legard, Bt	Conservative
Shaftesbury	Vere Fane Benett-Stanford	Conservative
Sheffield (Two members)	A. J. Mundella	Liberal
Sheffield (Two members)	John Arthur Roebuck	Liberal
Shrewsbury (Two members)	Charles Cecil Cotes	Liberal
Shrewsbury (Two members)	Henry Robertson	Liberal
Shropshire North (Two members)	John Ormsby-Gore	Conservative
Shropshire North (Two members)	Viscount Newport	Conservative
Shropshire South (Two members)	Hon. Sir Percy Egerton Herbert	Conservative
Shropshire South (Two members)	Edward Corbett	Conservative
County Sligo (Two members)	Sir Robert Gore-Booth	Conservative
County Sligo (Two members)	Denis Maurice O'Conor	Home Rule League
Somerset East (Two members)	Ralph Shuttleworth Allen	Conservative
Somerset East (Two members)	Richard Bright	Conservative
Somerset Mid (Two members)	Sir Richard Paget, Bt	Conservative
Somerset Mid (Two members)	Ralph Neville-Grenville	Conservative
Somerset West (Two members)	Hon. Arthur Hood	Conservative
Somerset West (Two members)	Vaughan Vaughan-Lee	Conservative
Southampton (Two members)	Russell Gurney	Conservative
Southampton (Two members)	Sir Frederick Perkins	Liberal
South Shields	James Cochran Stevenson	Liberal
Southwark (Two members)	John Locke	Liberal
Southwark (Two members)	Marcus Beresford	Conservative
Stafford (Two members)	Thomas Salt	Conservative
Stafford (Two members)	Alexander Macdonald	Liberal
Staffordshire East (Two members)	Michael Bass	Liberal
Staffordshire East (Two members)	Samuel Allsopp	Conservative
Staffordshire North (Two members)	Charles Adderley	Conservative
Staffordshire North (Two members)	Colin Minton Campbell	Conservative
Staffordshire West (Two members)	Francis Monckton	Conservative
Staffordshire West (Two members)	Alexander Staveley Hill	Conservative
Stalybridge	Tom Harrop Sidebottom	Conservative
Stamford	Sir John Dalrymple-Hay, Bt	Conservative
Stirling Burghs	Henry Campbell-Bannerman	Liberal
Stirlingshire	Sir William Edmonstone, Bt	Conservative
Stockport (Two members)	Charles Henry Hopwood	Liberal
Stockport (Two members)	Frederick Pennington	Liberal
Stockton	Joseph Dodds	Liberal
Stoke-upon-Trent (Two members)	George Melly	Liberal
Stoke-upon-Trent (Two members)	Robert Heath	Conservative
Stroud (Two members)	Sebastian Dickinson	Liberal
Stroud (Two members)	Walter John Stanton	Liberal
Suffolk East (Two members)	Viscount Mahon	Conservative
Suffolk East (Two members)	The Lord Rendlesham	Conservative
Suffolk West (Two members)	William Parker	Conservative
Suffolk West (Two members)	Lord Augustus Hervey	Conservative
Sunderland (Two members)	Sir Edward Temperley Gourley	Liberal
Sunderland (Two members)	Sir Henry Havelock-Allan, Bt	Liberal
Surrey East (Two members)	James Watney	Conservative
Surrey East (Two members)	William Grantham	Conservative
Surrey Mid (Two members)	Henry Peek	Conservative
Surrey Mid (Two members)	Sir Richard Baggallay	Conservative
Surrey West (Two members)	George Cubitt	Conservative
Surrey West (Two members)	Lee Steere	Conservative
Sussex East (Two members)	George Burrow Gregory	Conservative
Sussex East (Two members)	Montagu Scott	Conservative
Sussex West (Two members)	Walter Barttelot	Conservative
Sussex West (Two members)	The Earl of March	Conservative
Sutherland	The Marquess of Stafford	Liberal
Swansea District	Lewis Llewelyn Dillwyn	Liberal
== T ==
Constituency	MP	Party
Tamworth (Two members)	Sir Robert Peel, Bt	Liberal
Tamworth (Two members)	Robert William Hanbury	Conservative
Taunton (Two members)	Alexander Charles Barclay	Liberal
Taunton (Two members)	Sir Henry James	Liberal
Tavistock	Lord Arthur Russell	Liberal
Tewkesbury	William Edwin Price	Liberal
Thirsk	Sir William Payne-Gallwey, Bt	Conservative
Tipperary (Two members)	Charles William White	Home Rule League
Tipperary (Two members)	William O'Callaghan	Home Rule League
Tiverton (Two members)	John Heathcoat-Amory	Liberal
Tiverton (Two members)	William Nathaniel Massey	Liberal
Tower Hamlets (Two members)	Joseph d'Aguilar Samuda	Liberal
Tower Hamlets (Two members)	Charles Ritchie	Conservative
Tralee	Daniel O'Donoghue	Liberal
Truro (Two members)	Sir Frederick Williams, Bt	Conservative
Truro (Two members)	James McGarel-Hogg	Conservative
Tynemouth and North Shields	Thomas Eustace Smith	Liberal
Tyrone (Two members)	Hon. Henry Lowry-Corry	Conservative
Tyrone (Two members)	John Ellison-Macartney	Conservative
== W ==
Constituency	MP	Party
Wakefield	Edward Green	Conservative
Wallingford	Edward Wells	Conservative
Walsall	Charles Forster	Liberal
Wareham	John Erle-Drax	Conservative
Warrington	Gilbert Greenall	Conservative
Warwick (Two members)	Arthur Peel	Liberal
Warwick (Two members)	George Repton	Conservative
Warwickshire North (Two members)	Charles Newdigate Newdegate	Conservative
Warwickshire North (Two members)	William Bromley-Davenport	Conservative
Warwickshire South (Two members)	The Earl of Yarmouth	Conservative
Warwickshire South (Two members)	Sir John Eardley-Wilmot, Bt	Conservative
Waterford City (Two members)	Richard Power	Home Rule League
Waterford City (Two members)	Purcell O'Gorman	Home Rule League
County Waterford (Two members)	Sir John Esmonde, Bt	Home Rule League
County Waterford (Two members)	Lord Charles Beresford	Conservative
Wednesbury	Alexander Brogden	Liberal
Wenlock (Two members)	Alexander Brown	Liberal
Wenlock (Two members)	George Weld-Forester	Conservative
Westbury	Abraham Laverton	Liberal
Westmeath (Two members)	Patrick James Smyth	Home Rule League
Westmeath (Two members)	Lord Robert Montagu	Home Rule League
Westminster (Two members)	WilliamSmith	Conservative
Westminster (Two members)	Sir Charles Russell, Bt	Conservative
Westmorland (Two members)	William Lowther	Conservative
Westmorland (Two members)	The Earl of Bective	Conservative
Wexford	William Redmond	Home Rule League
County Wexford (Two members)	Sir George Bowyer, Bt	Home Rule League
County Wexford (Two members)	Keyes O'Clery	Home Rule League
Weymouth and Melcombe Regis (Two members)	Henry Edwards	Liberal
Weymouth and Melcombe Regis (Two members)	Sir Frederick Johnstone, Bt	Conservative
Whitby	William Henry Gladstone	Liberal
Whitehaven	George Cavendish-Bentinck	Conservative
Wick District	John Pender	Liberal
Wicklow (Two members)	William Dick	Conservative
Wicklow (Two members)	William Richard O'Byrne	Home Rule League
Wigan (Two members)	Lord Balniel	Conservative
Wigan (Two members)	Thomas Knowles	Conservative
Wigtown Burghs	Mark Stewart	Conservative
Wigtownshire	Robert Vans-Agnew	Conservative
Wilton	Sir Edmund Antrobus, Bt	Liberal
Wiltshire North (Two members)	Sir George Jenkinson, Bt	Conservative
Wiltshire North (Two members)	George Bucknall-Estcourt	Conservative
Wiltshire South (Two members)	Lord Henry Thynne	Conservative
Wiltshire South (Two members)	Viscount Folkestone	Conservative
Winchester (Two members)	William Barrow Simonds	Conservative
Winchester (Two members)	Arthur Robert Naghten	Conservative
Windsor	Robert Richardson-Gardner	Conservative
Wolverhampton (Two members)	Hon. Charles Pelham Villiers	Liberal
Wolverhampton (Two members)	Thomas Matthias Weguelin	Liberal
Woodstock	Lord Randolph Churchill	Conservative
Worcester (Two members)	Alexander Clunes Sheriff	Liberal
Worcester (Two members)	Thomas Rowley Hill	Liberal
Worcestershire East (Two members)	Henry Allsopp	Conservative
Worcestershire East (Two members)	Thomas Eades Walker	Conservative
Worcestershire West (Two members)	Frederick Knight	Conservative
Worcestershire West (Two members)	William Edward Dowdeswell	Conservative
Wycombe	William Carington	Liberal
== Y ==
Constituency	MP	Party
York (Two members)	James Lowther	Conservative
York (Two members)	George Leeman	Liberal
Yorkshire East Riding (Two members)	Christopher Sykes	Conservative
Yorkshire East Riding (Two members)	William Harrison-Broadley	Conservative
Yorkshire North Riding (Two members)	Frederick Milbank	Liberal
Yorkshire North Riding (Two members)	Viscount Helmsley	Conservative
Yorkshire West Riding East (Two members)	Christopher Beckett Denison	Conservative
Yorkshire West Riding East (Two members)	Joshua Fielden	Conservative
Yorkshire West Riding North (Two members)	Lord Frederick Cavendish	Liberal
Yorkshire West Riding North (Two members)	Mathew Wilson	Liberal
Yorkshire West Riding South (Two members)	Walter Spencer-Stanhope	Conservative
Yorkshire West Riding South (Two members)	Lewis Randle Starkey	Conservative
Youghal	Sir Joseph Neale McKenna	Home Rule League

== See also ==
- UK general election, 1874
- List of parliaments of the United Kingdom
