= 1879 East Somerset by-election =

UK Parliamentary by-election

The 1879 East Somerset by-election was fought on 19 March 1879. The by-election was fought due to the resignation of the incumbent Conservative MP, Ralph Shuttleworth Allen. It was won by the unopposed Conservative candidate Lord Brooke.
