= 1878 East Somerset by-election =

UK Parliamentary by-election

The 1878 East Somerset by-election was held on 20 March 1878. The by-election was held due to the death of the incumbent Conservative MP, Richard Bright. It was won by the unopposed Conservative candidate Sir Philip Miles.
