= Richard Bright =

Richard Bright may refer to:

- Richard Bright (physician) (1789–1858), English physician and early pioneer in the research of kidney disease
- Richard Bright (politician) (1822–1878), English Member of Parliament, 1868–1878 (nephew of the above)
- Richard Bright (actor) (1937–2006), American actor

== See also ==
- Rick Bright (born 1966), American immunologist
