= Henry John Trotter =

English barrister, railway director and Conservative politician

Henry John Trotter (8 December 1835 – 6 December 1888) was an English barrister, railway director and Conservative Party politician.

Trotter was the son of the Lieutenant—Colonel William Trotter, of Bishop Auckland and his wife Henrietta Skene. He was educated at Oriel College, Oxford and was called to the bar at Inner Temple in 1864. He was a lieutenant in the 2nd West Yorkshire Yeomanry Cavalry and became a director of the Great Eastern Railway and the North British Railway. He stood for parliament unsuccessfully at Tynemouth in 1868 and at Berwick-on-Tweed in 1881. He was a J.P. and deputy lieutenant for County Durham. He lived at Langton Grange, Gainford, Darlington.

In 1885 he was elected as the Member of Parliament (MP) for Colchester and held the seat until his death in 1888 at the age of 52. In 1888 was published his Descent of the family of Skene.

Parliament of the United Kingdom
Preceded by William Willis; Richard Knight Causton	Member of Parliament for Colchester; 1885 – 1888	Succeeded by Lord Brooke
