= Brigid Balfour =

British biologist and immunologist (1914–1994)

- Born: Brigid Mary Balfour; 24 May 1914; London, England
- Died: 1 March 1994 (aged 79); Hatfield, Hertfordshire, England
- Scientific career
- Workplaces: National Institute for Medical Research

Brigid Mary Balfour (24 May 1914 – 1 March 1994) was a British scientist who studied cellular morphology and ultrastructure in relation to immune function. She advanced the study of dendritic cells, realising that they were derived from Langerhans cells and played an important role in initiating and promoting immune reactions.

== Early life ==
Brigid Balfour was born in 1914 in St George Hanover Square, London to Hylda Snow (née Paget) and Archibald Edward Balfour, a barrister. Her maternal grandfather was Sir Richard Paget, a British politician and baronet.

== Career ==
Balfour began her career at the National Institute for Medical Research working in nutrition, as part of the Division of Biological Standards in 1945. In 1957, she became a member of the newly formed Division of Immunology, under John Humphrey, working alongside Brigitte Askonas and Walter Brocklehurst or Brockhurst. She left the institute in 1978.

== Publications ==
- Dale E. McFarlin and Brigid Balfour – "Contact Sensitivity in the Pig", Advances in Experimental Medicine and Biology. Volume 29, 1973, pp 539–544. doi:10.1007/978-1-4615-9017-0_78
- Brigid Balfour, Jacqueline A. O'Brien, M. Perera, J. Clarke, Tatjana Sumerska, Stella C. Knight – "The Effect of Veiled Cells on Lymphocyte Function", Advances in Experimental Medicine and Biology. Volume 149, 1982, pp 447–454. doi:10.1007/978-1-4684-9066-4_62 ISBN 978-1-4684-9066-4
