= William Temple-Gore-Langton, 4th Earl Temple of Stowe =

British politician (1847–1902)

William Stephen Temple-Gore-Langton, 4th Earl Temple of Stowe (11 May 1847 – 28 March 1902), known as William Gore-Langton until 1892, was a British Conservative politician.

== Biography ==
Gore-Langton was the son of William Gore-Langton and Lady Anna Eliza Mary, daughter of Richard Temple-Grenville, 2nd Duke of Buckingham and Chandos. On his father's side he was a descendant of Sir John Gore, Lord Mayor of London in 1624, and a kinsman of the Gore Baronets, the Earls of Arran and the Barons Harlech. He was elected to the House of Commons as one of two representatives for Somerset Mid in 1878, a seat he held until 1885. In 1892 he succeeded his uncle Richard Temple-Grenville, 3rd Duke of Buckingham and Chandos, as fourth Earl Temple of Stowe, according to a special remainder in the letters patent. He assumed by Royal licence the same year the additional surname and arms of Temple.

He was a major in the North Somerset Yeomanry, a Deputy Lieutenant and Justice of the peace for the county of Somerset, and an alderman.

== Family ==
Lord Temple of Stowe married, in 1870, Helen Mabel Graham-Montgomery, daughter of Sir Graham Graham-Montgomery, 3rd Baronet (her younger sister later married his uncle, and became the last Duchess of Buckingham and Chandos). They had three sons and five daughters:

- Algernon William Stephen Temple-Gore-Langton, 5th Earl Temple of Stowe (1871–1940)
- Captain Honourable Chandos Temple-Gore-Langton (1873–1921), Captain 1st Dragoon Guards
- Lady Gertrude Alice Temple-Gore-Langton (1874–1919); married in 1904 Major William Maurice Copland du Quesne Caillard, and left children.
- Lady Mabel Evelyn Temple-Gore-Langton (1876–1966)
- Lady Alice Mary Temple-Gore-Langton (1876–1961); married in 1909 her 2nd cousin Commander Hubert Edwin Gore-Langton (1883–1968), and left children.
- Lady Frances Aline Temple-Gore-Langton (1877–1952); married in 1908 Brigadier-General John Harington (1873–1943), son of Sir Richard Harington, 11th Baronet, and left children.
- Lady Clare Violet Temple-Gore-Langton (1880–1966); married in London on 20 January 1903 Thomas Francis Egerton (d.1951), of the Egerton family, son of Major George Mark Leycester Egerton, and a descendant of a younger brother of the 1st Baron Egerton, and left issue.
- Lieutenant-Commander Honourable Evelyn Arthur Temple-Gore-Langton (1884–1972), Royal Navy

In late 1901 the Earl and Countess left for Cairo to spend the winter in Egypt due to his ill health. He died there on 28 March 1902, aged 54, and was succeeded in the earldom by his eldest son Algernon, Lord Langton. His body was embalmed and brought back to the United Kingdom, where he was buried at Newton St Loe on 19 April 1902.

Lady Temple of Stowe died in 1919.

== Notes ==
Parliament of the United Kingdom
Preceded by Richard Paget; Ralph Neville-Grenville	Member of Parliament for Somerset Mid; 1878 – 1885; With: Richard Paget	Succeeded by Richard Paget; John Kenelm Digby Wingfield-Digby
Peerage of the United Kingdom
Preceded by Richard Temple-Grenville	Earl Temple of Stowe; 1892 – 1902	Succeeded by Algernon Temple-Gore-Langton
