= William Knatchbull =

British politician

William Francis Knatchbull (30 July 1804 – 2 May 1871), was a British Conservative politician.

Knatchbull was Member of Parliament for Somerset East between 1852 and 1865.

He died in May 1871, aged 66.

Parliament of the United Kingdom
Preceded by Sir William Miles, Bt; William Pinney	Member of Parliament for Somerset East; 1852–1865; With: Sir William Miles, Bt	Succeeded by Ralph Neville-Grenville; Richard Paget
Honorary titles
Preceded by John Jarrett	High Sheriff of Somerset; 1841	Succeeded by Robert Charles Tudway
