= Francis Greville, 5th Earl of Warwick =

British Conservative politician (1853–1924)

The Right Honourable The Earl of Warwick
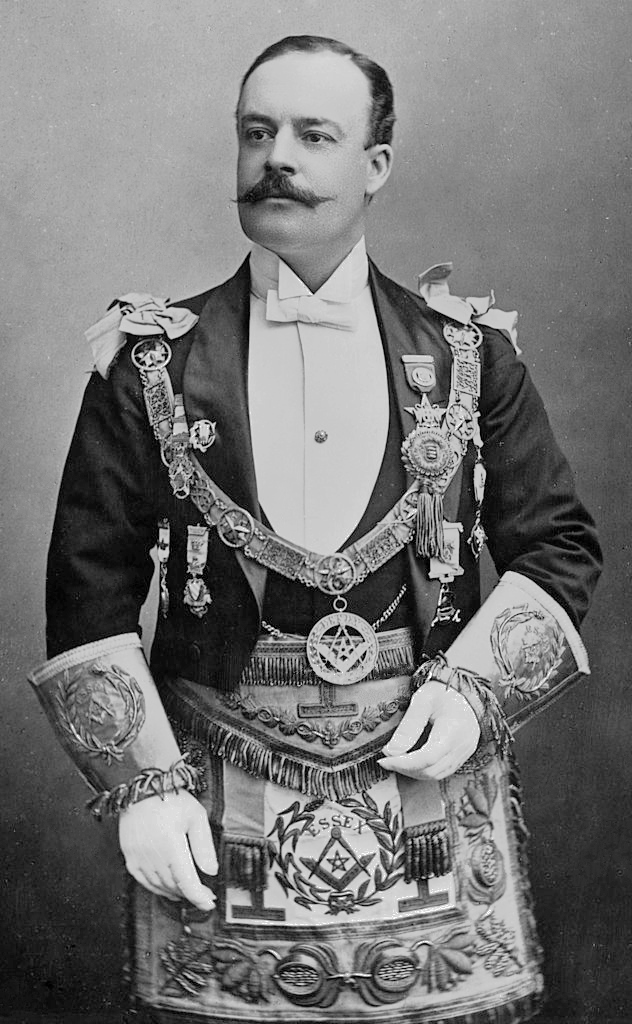
- The 5th Earl of Warwick wearing masonic regalia in 1889

Earl of Warwick
- In office 1893–1924
- Preceded by: George Greville
- Succeeded by: Leopold Greville

Member of Parliament for Somerset East with: Sir Philip Miles
- In office 1879–1885
- Preceded by: Ralph Shuttleworth Allen; Sir Philip Miles
- Succeeded by: Constituency abolished

Member of Parliament for Colchester
- In office 1888–1892
- Preceded by: Henry John Trotter
- Succeeded by: Sir Herbert Naylor-Leyland

Lord-Lieutenant of Essex
- In office 1901–1919
- Preceded by: The Lord Rayleigh
- Succeeded by: The Lord Lambourne

Personal details
- Born: Francis Richard Charles Guy Greville, Lord Brooke; 9 February 1853
- Died: 15 January 1924 (aged 70)
- Party: Conservative
- Spouse: Daisy Maynard (m. 1881)
- Children: Leopold Greville, 6th Earl of Warwick; Marjorie Duncombe, Countess of Feversham; Charles Greville; Maynard Greville; Lady Mercy Gamble
- Parents: George Greville, 4th Earl of Warwick; Lady Anne Wemyss-Charteris
- Education: Eton College; Christ Church, Oxford
- Occupation: Politician

Francis Richard Charles Guy Greville, 5th Earl of Warwick (9 February 1853 – 15 January 1924), styled Lord Brooke until 1893, was a British Conservative politician.

== Early life ==
Greville was the son of George Greville, 4th Earl of Warwick, and his wife, Lady Anne, daughter of Francis Wemyss-Charteris, 9th Earl of Wemyss, and was educated at Eton and Christ Church, Oxford.

On 28 February 1874, he was appointed a supernumerary sub-lieutenant in the Warwickshire Yeomanry. Brooke was appointed a deputy lieutenant of Warwickshire on 3 March 1875 and promoted to captain in the Yeomanry on 26 August 1876.

== Career ==
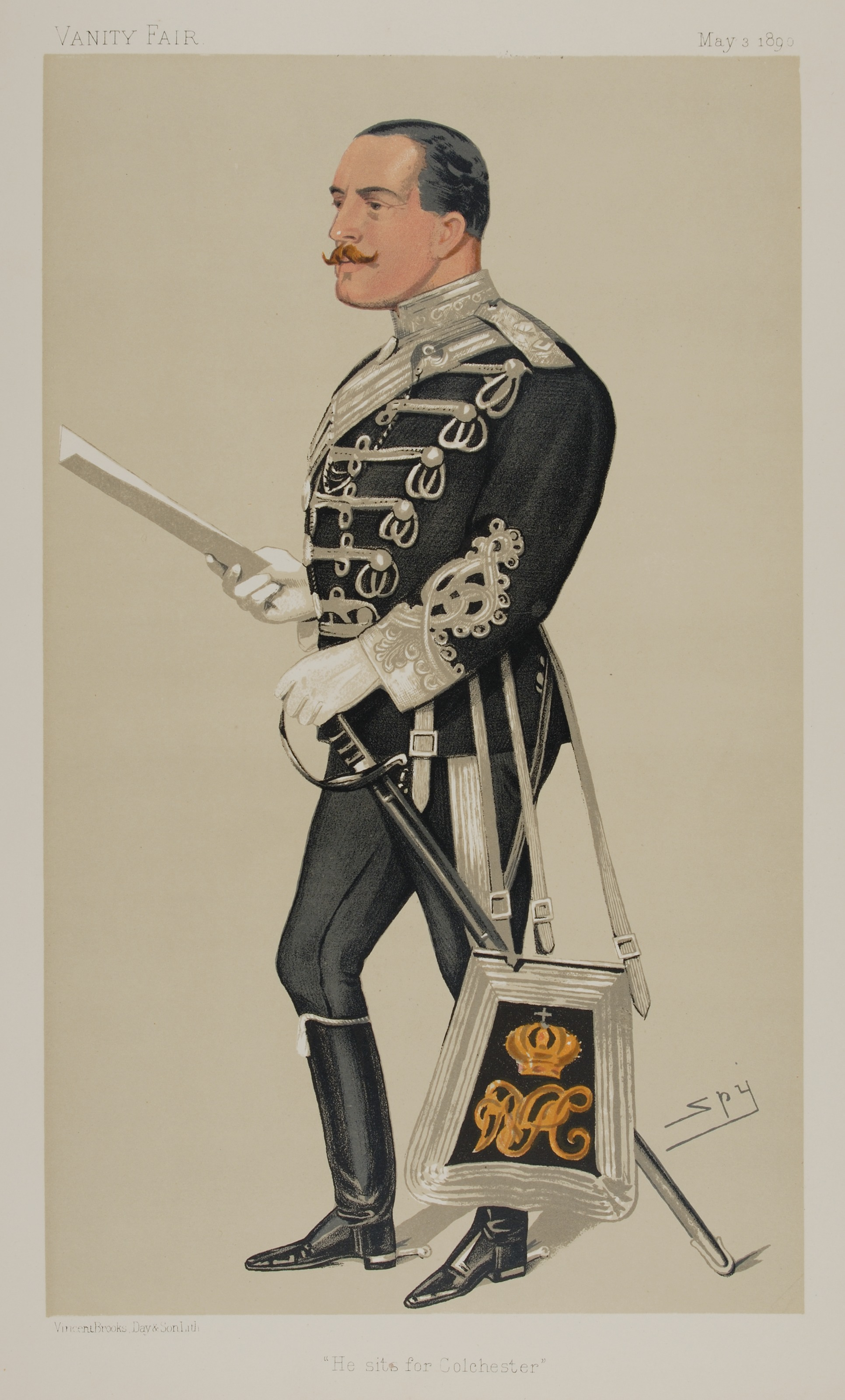
Francis Greville Vanity Fair 3 May 1890

He entered Parliament for Somerset East in an 1879 by-election, a seat he held until 1885, and later represented Colchester from 1888 to 1892. The following year, Greville succeeded his father in the earldom and entered the House of Lords.

In August 1901, he was appointed Lord-Lieutenant of Essex, serving as such until 1919. He was appointed deputy lieutenant of the county on 8 July 1919. In November 1901 he was appointed Honorary Colonel of the new Essex Imperial Yeomanry Regiment, and in late 1901 he was elected Mayor of Warwick for the following year.

He was a senior Freemason under the United Grand Lodge of England, and rose to the office of Deputy Grand Master under the Grand Mastership of Albert Edward, Prince of Wales, later King Edward VII. He was also a member of the Ancient Order of Druids (AOD); in August 1905 he was one of the British aristocrat members of the Order who participated in the first ceremony organized by the AOD at Stonehenge.

== Personal life ==
Lord Warwick married Frances Evelyn Maynard (10 December 1861 – 26 July 1938), daughter of Charles Henry Maynard, in 1881. They had five children:

- Leopold Guy Francis Maynard Greville, 6th Earl of Warwick (10 September 1882 – 31 January 1928)
- Lady Marjorie Blanche Eva Greville (25 October 1884 – 25 July 1964); she married Charles Duncombe, 2nd Earl of Feversham
- Charles Algernon Cromartie Greville (22 November 1885 – 28 March 1887)
- Maynard Greville (21 March 1898 – 21 February 1960)
- Lady Mercy Greville (3 April 1904 – 21 November 1968); actress under stage name Nancie Parsons. She married first Basil Dean and later, in 1936, Patrick Henry Noel Gamble.

It is likely that only his eldest son was fathered by the Earl. Lady Marjorie was said to be fathered by Lord Charles Beresford. The youngest two children were reputedly fathered by one of the countess' lovers, millionaire bachelor Joseph Laycock.

Francis Greville, 5th Earl of Warwick died in January 1924, aged 70, and is buried in the Collegiate Church of St Mary, Warwick. He was succeeded in the earldom by his eldest son Leopold. The Countess of Warwick died in July 1938, aged 76.

Parliament of the United Kingdom
Preceded by Ralph Shuttleworth Allen; Sir Philip Miles	Member of Parliament for Somerset East; 1879–1885; With: Sir Philip Miles	Constituency abolished
Preceded by Henry John Trotter	Member of Parliament for Colchester; 1888–1892	Succeeded by Herbert Naylor-Leyland
Honorary titles
Preceded by The Lord Rayleigh	Lord-Lieutenant of Essex; 1901–1919	Succeeded by The Lord Lambourne
Peerage of Great Britain
Preceded by George Greville	Earl Brooke; Earl of Warwick; 1893–1924	Succeeded by Leopold Greville
