= Miles baronets =

Baronetcy in the Baronetage of the United Kingdom

Miles baronets, of Leigh Court
- Motto: Labora sicut bonus miles
- Arms: Azure a chevron paly of six ermine and or between three lozenges argent each charged with a fleur-de-lis sable
- Crest: Upon a helm barry affronte with visor open a dexter arm embowed in armour proper garnished or supporting with the hand an anchor also proper

The Miles Baronetcy, of Leigh Court in the County of Somerset, is a title in the Baronetage of the United Kingdom. It was created on 19 April 1859 for the banker and Conservative politician William Miles. His son, the second Baronet, was also a banker and Conservative politician. The family's bank, founded in 1750, eventually became part of NatWest.

Philip John Miles, father of the first Baronet, was Mayor of Bristol and sat as member of parliament for Westbury, Corfe Castle and Bristol. The first Baronet was an uncle of Philip Napier Miles, Frank Miles and Christopher Oswald Miles.

== Miles baronets, of Leigh Court (1859) ==
- Sir William Miles, 1st Baronet (1797–1878)
- Sir Philip John William Miles, 2nd Baronet (1825–1888)
- Sir Cecil Miles, 3rd Baronet (1873–1898)
- Sir Henry Robert William Miles, 4th Baronet (1843–1915)
- Sir Charles William Miles, OBE, 5th Baronet (1883–1966)
- Sir William Napier Maurice Miles, 6th Baronet (1913–2010)
- Sir Philip John Miles, 7th Baronet (born 1953). As of 2026, the Official Roll shows the baronetcy as dormant. There is no heir.
