= Central Agricultural Protection Society =

The Central Agricultural Protection Society was a British pressure group formed in February 1844 under the leadership of the Duke of Richmond (president) and the Duke of Buckingham and Chandos (vice-president) in order to campaign in favour of the retention of the Corn Laws.

The Society's constitution forbade any discussion of party politics or interference in elections. Their first meeting was held at Richmond's house in Portland Place.

Shortly after this a farmers' meeting took place in the Freemason's Tavern, London, at which the farmers decided to form a central office to coordinate the various local protectionist societies that had sprung up in the wake of the Anti-Corn Law League's agitation for repeal. There were 250 farmers present from nine counties as well as George Darby MP and William Miles MP, who were both representatives of the Central Agricultural Protection Society. During this meeting it was decided to merge this society with the Central Agricultural Protection Society.

A committee of 22 delegates from the farmers' society was then sent to Portland Place, where Richmond, the Duke of Leeds and 40 or 50 other landlords were present. They discussed how the Society would be constituted. The Society was to have a president, vice-president, four trustees and a managing committee of 40 members (20 of whom must always be tenant farmers). Their office was at 19 Old Bond Street, London and a secretary was appointed, with office hours of ten until four.

On 9 December 1845 a tenant farmer from Warwickshire complained at a meeting of the Society that the gentry had founded it "in obedience to the voice of the tenant-farmers" and then sat back and did nothing because they did not want to break up the Conservative Party. The historian Robert Stewart has said that "the society was little more than a pacifier to stop the tenant farmers from crying". The historian T. L. Crosby wrote that "the Central Society was not the most active force in the protectionist movement. Protection's real strength lay in the local societies scattered throughout the country and here farmers were able to exert significant influence".

On 10 December 1846 the committee of the Society unanimously resolved that the Conservative Party should advocate the repeal of the malt tax but this was met by disapproval amongst all sections of the Party and when put to the whole Society in January 1847 it was defeated.
