= William Papwell Brigstocke =

William Papwell Brigstocke (1788 – January 1834) was a British politician.

Brigstocke lived in Combe Hay. He stood as a Whig in the 1832 UK general election in East Somerset, winning a seat. He supported electoral reform, and the immediate abolition of slavery. He died in January 1834, while still in office.

Brigstocke's eldest daughter was Georgina Anne Dalrymple, who became an author.

Parliament of the United Kingdom
New constituency	Member of Parliament for East Somerset; 1832–1834; With: William Gore-Langton	Succeeded by William Miles; William Gore-Langton
