= Sir William Miles, 1st Baronet =

English politician, agriculturalist and landowner

Miles baronets, of Leigh Court
- Motto: Labora sicut bonus miles
- Arms: Azure a chevron paly of six ermine and or between three lozenges argent each charged with a fleur-de-lis sable, in chief upon an inescutcheon argent a sinister hand appaume coupled at the wrist gules
- Crest: Upon a helm barry affronte with visor open a dexter arm embowed in armour proper garnished or supporting with the hand an anchor also proper

Sir William Miles, 1st Baronet (13 May 1797 – 17 June 1878), was an English politician, agriculturalist and landowner. He was educated at Eton College and Christ Church, Oxford, and was created a baronet on 19 April 1859, of Leigh Court, Somerset.

== Family ==
Miles was the son of Philip John Miles (1773–1845) by his first marriage to Maria Whetham (1776–1811). His father was a landowner, shipowner, banker and reportedly the first millionaire in Bristol.

Miles married Catherine (1798–1869), daughter of John Gordon, on 12 September 1823, with whom he had the following children:-

- Sir Philip John William Miles, 2nd Baronet
- Maria Catherine Miles (1826–1909), who married Robert Charles Tudway, MP for Wells (UK Parliament constituency), and had issue.
- Agatha Miles (1827–1912), who married General Edward Arthur Somerset, CB; they had eight daughters and one son.
- Emma Clara Miles (1830–1911), who married Reverend Hon James Walter Lascelles, son of Henry Lascelles, 3rd Earl of Harewood, and had nine children.
- Captain William Henry Miles, JP (1830–1888), who married Mary Frances Kynaston Charlton, daughter of Rev John Kynaston Charleton; they had a son, Eustace Miles, and two daughters.
- Captain Charles John William Miles (1832–1874), who served in the 5th Regiment of Foot and married Elizabeth Maria Lloyd, daughter of Rev Henry Lloyd, but had no children.
- Catherine Miles (1834–1911), who married General Sir Robert Onesiphorus Bright, GCB, and had three sons and five daughters.
- Frances Harriett Miles (1835–1923), who married on 4th September 1862 Sir William Augustus Ferguson Davie, 3rd Baronet, (1833-1915) Senior Clerk to the House of Commons and second son son of General Sir Henry Ferguson Davie, 1st Baronet; they had five children.
- Florence Louisa Miles (1840–1862), who married The Reverend Francis Edmund Cecil Byng, 5th Earl of Strafford, Chaplain to Queen Victoria, and had two children. She died after giving birth to their second child, Edmund Byng, 6th Earl of Strafford.
- Arthur John William Whetham Miles (1841–1853).
- Harriott Ellin Miles (1841–1864), who married Robert Gurdon, 1st Baron Cranworth, MP for South Norfolk (UK Parliament constituency) and Mid Norfolk, JP; she died after giving birth to their only child, a daughter.
- Sir Henry Robert William Miles, 4th Baronet (1843–1915), who succeeded his nephew Sir Cecil Miles to the Baronetcy.

== Political career ==
He was Tory Member of Parliament (MP) for Chippenham from 1818 to 1820, for New Romney from 1830 to 1832, and sat for East Somerset from 1834 to 1865 as a Conservative. During his time as MP for East Somerset, he was returned unopposed at all elections bar one. He voluntarily retired his seat in 1865 and it was subsequently held from 1878 by Sir William's son, Sir Philip Miles. He served a total of 35 years 7 months and 30 days, making him one of the longest serving MPs in the UK's parliament.

Sir William was a staunch Conservative, opposed to the Reform Act, and was a protectionist who favoured the Corn Law and supported the Duke of Richmond's Central Agricultural Protection Society (known as the "Anti-League"). Miles's sympathies lay with the landowning interest in the Party. He supported the protectionist Benjamin Disraeli's early career, and was described in The Athenaeum as "chiefly responsible for his [Disraeli's] appointment". The two shared extensive correspondence and visited each other's houses over many years. It was his actions as a leader of the protectionist faction of the Conservative Party in parliament and support for Lord Derby's Prime Ministership that saw him elevated to the Baronetage.

He supported amendments to the Poor Law to ensure that the responsibility for a bastard was not left solely upon the mother, as originally proposed, but would "place some portion of the responsibility on the head of the father".

Miles supported Enclosure, maintaining that "Allotments of land under enclosures were much more beneficial to the poor than a common right of pasture. Not one inhabitant in ten of a parish made use of a common for purposes of pasturage; but when Allotments were made, every inhabitant participated in the benefit."

He was deeply religious, at one stage putting forward an amendment in Parliament to prevent trains running on the then newly proposed Great Western Railway on Sundays.

== Other roles ==
Sir William was chairman of Somerset Quarter Sessions for 35 years, partner in the family's bank, Miles & Co (which later became part of NatWest), from 1845 to his death in 1878, and commanded the North Somerset Yeomanry Cavalry as its Colonel.

He was a member of Arthur's, Boodles, the Carlton, and the United University Club

When the parish church at Abbots Leigh burned down in 1847, he paid for its rebuilding from his own pocket.

This afternoon while the bells were chiming for divine service, a fire broke out in the rafters of the roof on the north side of the Church, it was ascertained the next day that the fire was caused by a crack in the chimney of the Store which was most negligently & stupidly built of only one brick thick and placed in immediate contact with the wall plate upon which the feet of the rafters rested. The fire, not withstanding the most active exertions of all the male inhabitants headed by William Miles Esq., whose exertions were almost incredible; the aid of the powerful engine from Leigh Court and after an interval of an hour and a half the assistance of three engines from Bristol, consumed the whole of the roof of the nave and south Aisle, the gallery, pulpit, reading desk and nearly all the pews leaving the tower and chancel uninjured.

Sir William was Vice-President of the Society for Improving the Condition of the Labouring Classes which sought to improve housing for working families. It eventually became part of the Peabody Trust.

== Royal Agricultural Society ==
A prominent agriculturalist and one of the founding fathers of the Royal Agricultural Society, he was chairman of the local committee who "contributed to the excellence of the arrangements" for the Bristol Country Meeting. He took a practical interest in experiments on his farms.

He regularly hosted the Society and served on its Management Committee as well as being Chairman of the Local Committee at Bristol in 1842 when he judged the trials at Pusey. He lent his own steam engines at Leigh Court for experiments following an anti-modernisation protest in 1847. He was the Royal Agricultural Society's Steward of Implements from 1841 to 1847 and during his Stewardship, the Exhibition of Implements grew from "a couple of sheds to an extend which even then gave promise of the vast proportions which the Shows have attained in recent years".

He was then a member of the Council and, from 1852 until his death in 1878, one of the 12 Vice-Presidents. Upon his death, his place as Vice-President was taken by Lord Skelmersdale and the President was the Prince of Wales, a shooting companion of Sir William's son.

Sir William served also as President in 1854–5 when he headed the Society's deputation to the Universal Exhibition in Paris when he was "received, both by the Emperor, the Ministers, and the learned Societies of that Capital with marked courtesy."

In his obituary, it was said that

"... ample testimony should be borne to the unwearied energy which Sir William Miles displayed in everything he undertook. No day was too long for him and no obstacle too great to be surmounted ... He was endowed with great promptitude of decision and although he required his decisions to be carried out to the very letter, and enforced them where necessary, there always predominated a frankness and manliness of character which won the confidence of all with whom he came in contact and endeared him to those who had the advantage of being associated with him as colleagues."

"A keen sportsman, he was a hard rider with Sir Richard Sutton, Bt, at Lincoln in his youth (see Burton Hunt), an earnest politician, an able magistrate, an enlightened agriculturalist and a warm-hearted friend."

== Death and succession ==
Sir William was succeeded in the baronetcy by his eldest son, Philip (1825–1888), who was later an MP for East Somerset. He was uncle of Philip Napier Miles.

Parliament of the United Kingdom
Preceded by Charles Brooke and John Maitland	Member of Parliament for Chippenham; 1818–1820; With: George Spencer-Churchill, 1818–1820	Succeeded by William Madocks and John Grossett
Preceded by George Hay Dawkins-Pennant and George William Tapps	Member of Parliament for New Romney; 1830–1832; With: Arthur Hill-Trevor, to 1831; Sir Roger Gresley, March–April 1831; Sir Edward Dering, 1831–1832	Constituency abolished
Preceded by William Langton and William Brigstocke	Member of Parliament for East Somerset; 1834–1865; With: William Langton, to 1847; William Pinney, 1847–1852; William Knatchbull, from 1852	Succeeded by Ralph Neville-Grenville and Richard Horner Paget
Baronetage of the United Kingdom
New creation	Baronet (of Leigh Court, Somerset); 1859–1878	Succeeded by Philip Miles
