= Sir Philip Miles, 2nd Baronet =

English politician (1825-1888

Sir Philip John William Miles 2nd Baronet
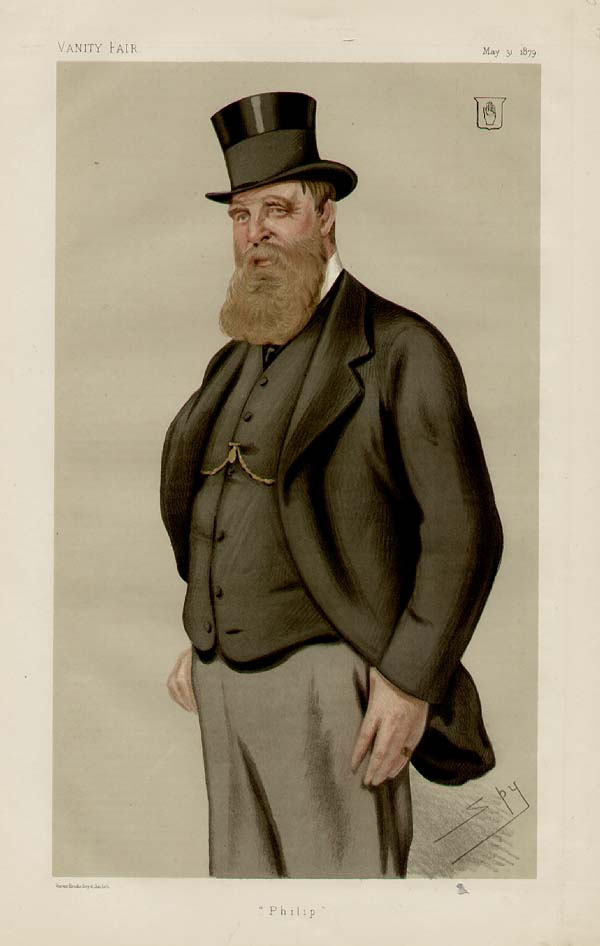
- "Philip". Caricature by Spy published in Vanity Fair in 1879

High Sheriff of Bristol
- In office 1853–1853
- Preceded by: Richard Bright
- Succeeded by: Robert Phippen

Member of Parliament for East Somerset
- In office 1878–1885
- Preceded by: Ralph Neville-Grenville and Richard Paget
- Succeeded by: Ralph Shuttleworth Allen and Richard Bright

Solicitor General for England and Wales
- In office 1856–1857
- Preceded by: Sir Richard Bethell
- Succeeded by: Sir Henry Singer Keating

Personal details
- Born: 2 September 1825
- Died: 5 June 1888 (aged 62) London, England
- Party: Conservative
- Spouse: Frances Roche (m. 1848–1888)
- Children: 6
- Parent: William Miles (father)
- Education: Eton College
- Alma mater: Trinity College, Cambridge
- Military career
- Allegiance: United Kingdom
- Branch: British Army
- Unit: 17th Lancers

Sir Philip John William Miles, 2nd Baronet (2 September 1825 – 5 June 1888) was an English politician. Educated at Eton College and Trinity College, Cambridge, he then served in the 17th Lancers. He was a sheriff of Bristol in 1853 and partner in the family's bank, Miles & Co, from 1852 to 1854. He sat as Conservative Member of Parliament (MP) for East Somerset from 1878 to 1885 and was a member of the Carlton Club and the Army and Navy Club.

In 1878, he inherited the baronetcy of Leigh Court, Somerset, from his father William, who had previously been Conservative MP for East Somerset along, with estates in Somerset. He had his own estate in County Kerry, Ireland. He was cousin of Philip Napier Miles, Frank Miles and Katharine Tennant.

He supported an amendment to the Representation of the People Act 1884 and the Franchise Bill debated earlier that year, that would have allowed votes for women who were householders on equal terms with men. The vote was defeated and women finally received the vote in the UK in 1918.

Miles baronets, of Leigh Court
- Motto: Labora sicut bonus miles
- Arms: Azure a chevron paly of six ermine and or between three lozenges argent each charged with a fleur-de-lis sable, in chief upon an inescutcheon argent a sinister hand appaume coupled at the wrist gules
- Crest: Upon a helm barry affronte with visor open a dexter arm embowed in armour proper garnished or supporting with the hand an anchor also proper

In 1848, he married Frances Roche (1827–1908), daughter of Sir David Roche, Bt, Roche baronets, MP for Limerick. Frances was a renowned society beauty nicknamed the "Venus of Miles" in reference to the classical sculpture the Venus de Milo. She attracted a number of admirers including Charles Manners, 6th Duke of Rutland who scandalised society by leaving his 120-foot yacht, Lufra, to her in his will. They had the following children:

- Alice Catherine Miles (1850–1926), who married firstly in 1870 George Duppa, JP (1819–1888), and secondly in 1889 Lt Col Gerard Vivian Ames, 1st The Royal Dragoons (1853–1899), having six children between the two marriages.
- William John Miles (1852–1859).
- Edith Clara Miles (1854–1934), who in 1875 married Charles William Mansel Lewis (1849–1931) of Stradey Castle, Llanelli, Deputy Lieutenant and High Sheriff of Carmarthen, and had a son and a daughter.
- Mabel Constance Miles (1856–1944), who married Casamajor William Gaussen (chief guest at the wedding was the Prince of Wales, later King Edward VII, a friend and shooting companion of Sir Philip Miles), and had issue.
- Violet Bessie Miles (1867–1883).
- Sir Cecil Miles, 3rd Baronet (1873–1898), who married Minnie Spire in 1896 but had no children. His widow subsequently married Frederick Hilton Gibbes in 1904.

He died of acute laryngitis at his London house, 75 Cornwall Gardens, Kensington, SW, and was succeeded by his son, Cecil, in 1888. His widow subsequently married an American from St Louis, Missouri, Dr John Nicholls, in 1904 and they lived at Maidenhead, Berkshire, and she died in 1908.

Parliament of the United Kingdom
Preceded by Ralph Neville-Grenville and Richard Paget	Member of Parliament for East Somerset; 1878–1885; With: Ralph Shuttleworth Allen	Succeeded by Ralph Shuttleworth Allen and Richard Bright
Baronetage of the United Kingdom
Preceded by William Miles	Baronet (of Leigh Court, Somerset); 1878–1888	Succeeded by Cecil Miles
