= East Somerset =

Former parliamentary constituency in the United Kingdom

- Former county constituency for the House of Commons
- Context: 1832-1868. Extract from 1837 result: the main eastern striped area at centre
- County: Somerset

1885–1918
- Seats: One
- Replaced by: Wells and Yeovil

1832–1885
- Seats: Two
- Type of constituency: County constituency
- Created from: Somerset

East Somerset was the name of a parliamentary constituency in Somerset, represented in the House of Commons of the Parliament of the United Kingdom between 1832 and 1918.

From 1832 to 1885, it returned two Members of Parliament (MPs), elected by the bloc vote system of election. From 1885 to 1918, a different constituency of the same name returned one MP, elected by the first past the post voting system.

== Boundaries ==
1832–1868: The Hundreds or Liberties of Bath Forum, Bempstone, Brent and Wrington, Bruton, Catsash, Chew and Chewton, Norton Ferris, Frome, Glaston Twelve Hides, Hampton and Claverton, Horethorne, Keynsham, Kilmersdon, Mells and Leigh, Portbury, Wellow, Wells Forum, Whitstone, Winterstoke, and Witham Friary, and the parts of the Hundred of Hartcliffe with Bedminster excluded from the limits of the City of Bristol.

1885–1918: The Sessional Divisions of Somerton and Wincanton, and part of the Sessional Divisions of Shepton Mallet and Wells.

== History ==
=== 1832–1868 ===
The constituency, formally called The Eastern Division of Somerset, was created for the 1832 general election, when the former Somerset constituency was divided into new East and West divisions. It also absorbed the voters from the abolished borough of Milborne Port. The constituency might have been better described as North-Eastern Somerset, since its limits stopped well short of the southern extremities of the county. It surrounded the cities of Bath and Wells (although both were boroughs electing MPs in their own right, freeholders within these boroughs who met the property-owning qualifications for the county franchise could vote in East Somerset as well, as could those in Frome); other towns in the division were Glastonbury, Burnham-on-Sea, Clevedon, Keynsham, Midsomer Norton, Portishead, Radstock, Shepton Mallet, Somerton and Weston-super-Mare.

=== 1868–1885 ===
The Second Reform Act brought about significant boundary changes, which came into effect at the 1868 general election, as Somerset was given a third county constituency. The southern end of East Somerset (including Glastonbury, Radstock, Shepton Mallet and Somerton as well as the area round Frome and Wells) was moved into the new Mid Somerset division. The revised East Somerset constituency was now defined as consisting of the Long Ashton, Axbridge, Keynsham, Temple Cloud and Weston Petty Sessional Divisions.

=== 1885–1918 ===
At the 1885 general election, there were further radical boundary changes, Somerset's three two-member county divisions together with one abolished borough being reorganised into seven single-member county constituencies. One of these took the name of Eastern Somerset, but this included none of the voters from the 1867-85 East Somerset constituency, who were divided between the new Frome, Northern Somerset and Wells divisions.

The new Eastern division was carved out of the previous Mid Somerset division, with Shepton Mallet being its largest town; it also included Somerton, Street and Wincanton. This was a predominantly rural constituency, though with some industry in the towns (notably brewing and bootmaking), and a strong Nonconformist religious tradition. It would probably have been a safe Liberal seat, but when its sitting Liberal MP joined the Liberal Unionists when the party split in 1886, he had no difficulty holding his seat until he retired.

=== Abolition ===
The constituency was abolished for the 1918 general election, when Somerset's number of county members was reduced by one. It was mostly replaced by the revised Wells county constituency, but the town of Somerton was transferred to Yeovil.

== Members of Parliament ==
=== MPs 1832–1885 ===
Election	1st Member	1st Party	2nd Member	2nd Party
1832	William Gore-Langton	Whig	William Papwell Brigstocke	Whig
Feb. 1834 by-election	William Gore-Langton	Whig	William Miles^{1}	Tory
Dec. 1834	William Gore-Langton	Whig	William Miles^{1}	Conservative
1847 by-election	William Pinney	Whig	William Miles^{1}	Conservative
1852	William Knatchbull	Conservative	William Miles^{1}	Conservative
1865	Ralph Neville-Grenville	Conservative	Richard Paget	Conservative
1868	Ralph Shuttleworth Allen	Conservative	Richard Bright	Conservative
1878 by-election	Ralph Shuttleworth Allen	Conservative	Sir Philip Miles, Bt	Conservative
1879 by-election	Lord Brooke	Conservative	Sir Philip Miles, Bt	Conservative
1885	Redistribution of Seats Act: Name transferred to a different constituency, electing only one member			

Notes
^{1} Miles was created a Baronet in 1859.

=== MPs 1885–1918 ===
Election	Member	Party
1885	Henry Hobhouse	Liberal
1886	Henry Hobhouse	Liberal Unionist
1906	John Thompson	Liberal
1910	Ernest Jardine	Liberal Unionist
1912	Ernest Jardine	Conservative
1918	constituency abolished	

== Election results ==
Decades:	1840s; 1850s; 1860s; 1870s; 1880s; 1890s; 1900s; 1910s

=== Elections in the 1830s ===
General election 1832: East Somerset
Party	Candidate	Votes	%
Whig	William Gore-Langton	4,249	35.8
Whig	William Papwell Brigstock	4,003	33.8
Tory	William Miles	3,603	30.4
Majority		400	3.4
Turnout		7,694	85.5
Registered electors		8,996	
Whig win (new seat)			
Whig win (new seat)			

Brigstock's death caused a by-election.

By-election, 3 February 1834: East Somerset
Party	Candidate	Votes	%
Tory	William Miles	Unopposed	
Tory gain from Whig			

General election 1835: East Somerset
Party	Candidate	Votes	%
Whig	William Gore-Langton	Unopposed	
Conservative	William Miles	Unopposed	
Registered electors		9,107	
Whig hold			
Conservative gain from Whig			

General election 1837: East Somerset
Party	Candidate	Votes	%
Whig	William Gore-Langton	Unopposed	
Conservative	William Miles	Unopposed	
Registered electors		9,561	
Whig hold			
Conservative hold			

=== Elections in the 1840s ===
General election 1841: East Somerset
Party	Candidate	Votes	%	±%
Conservative	William Miles	Unopposed		
Whig	William Gore-Langton	Unopposed		
Registered electors		9,759		
Conservative hold				
Whig hold				

Gore-Langton's death caused a by-election.

By-election, 10 April 1847: East Somerset
Party	Candidate	Votes	%	±%
Whig	William Pinney	Unopposed		
Whig hold				

General election 1847: East Somerset
Party	Candidate	Votes	%	±%
Conservative	William Miles	Unopposed		
Whig	William Pinney	Unopposed		
Registered electors		9,655		
Conservative hold				
Whig hold				

=== Elections in the 1850s ===
General election 1852: East Somerset
Party	Candidate	Votes	%	±%
Conservative	William Miles	4,643	38.9	N/A
Conservative	William Knatchbull	4,309	36.1	N/A
Whig	Arthur Elton	2,984	25.0	N/A
Majority		1,325	11.1	N/A
Turnout		7,460 (est)	73.6 (est)	N/A
Registered electors		10,140		
Conservative hold				
Conservative gain from Whig				

General election 1857: East Somerset
Party	Candidate	Votes	%	±%
Conservative	William Knatchbull	Unopposed		
Conservative	William Miles	Unopposed		
Registered electors		10,592		
Conservative hold				
Conservative hold				

General election 1859: East Somerset
Party	Candidate	Votes	%	±%
Conservative	William Knatchbull	Unopposed		
Conservative	William Miles	Unopposed		
Registered electors		10,644		
Conservative hold				
Conservative hold				

=== Elections in the 1860s ===
General election 1865: East Somerset
Party	Candidate	Votes	%	±%
Conservative	Richard Paget	Unopposed		
Conservative	Ralph Neville-Grenville	Unopposed		
Registered electors		11,867		
Conservative hold				
Conservative hold				

General election 1868: East Somerset
Party	Candidate	Votes	%	±%
Conservative	Ralph Shuttleworth Allen	3,887	29.7	N/A
Conservative	Richard Bright	3,848	29.4	N/A
Liberal	Arthur Hayter	2,704	20.6	New
Liberal	William Pinney	2,656	20.3	New
Majority		1,144	8.8	N/A
Turnout		6,548 (est)	74.4 (est)	N/A
Registered electors		8,795		
Conservative hold				
Conservative hold				

=== Elections in the 1870s ===
General election 1874: East Somerset
Party	Candidate	Votes	%	±%
Conservative	Ralph Shuttleworth Allen	Unopposed		
Conservative	Richard Bright	Unopposed		
Registered electors		8,435		
Conservative hold				
Conservative hold				

Bright's death caused a by-election.

By-election, 20 Mar 1878: East Somerset
Party	Candidate	Votes	%	±%
Conservative	Philip Miles	Unopposed		
Conservative hold				

Allen resigned, causing a by-election.

By-election, 19 Mar 1879: East Somerset
Party	Candidate	Votes	%	±%
Conservative	Francis Greville	Unopposed		
Conservative hold				

=== Elections in the 1880s ===
General election 1880: East Somerset
Party	Candidate	Votes	%	±%
Conservative	Francis Greville	Unopposed		
Conservative	Philip Miles	Unopposed		
Registered electors		8,360		
Conservative hold				
Conservative hold				

Hobhouse

General election 1885: East Somerset
Party	Candidate	Votes	%	±%
Liberal	Henry Hobhouse	4,732	59.1	New
Conservative	Henry Hoare	3,280	40.9	N/A
Majority		1,452	18.2	N/A
Turnout		8,012	85.7	N/A
Registered electors		9,344		
Liberal gain from Conservative				

General election 1886: East Somerset
Party	Candidate	Votes	%	±%
Liberal Unionist	Henry Hobhouse	Unopposed		
Liberal Unionist gain from Liberal				

=== Elections in the 1890s ===
Morley

General election 1892: East Somerset
Party	Candidate	Votes	%	±%
Liberal Unionist	Henry Hobhouse	4,330	54.8	N/A
Liberal	Charles Morley	3,575	45.2	New
Majority		755	9.6	N/A
Turnout		7,905	85.8	N/A
Registered electors		9,208		
Liberal Unionist hold				

General election 1895: East Somerset
Party	Candidate	Votes	%	±%
Liberal Unionist	Henry Hobhouse	4,408	56.9	+2.1
Liberal	John Swinburne-Hanham	3,334	43.1	−2.1
Majority		1,074	13.8	+4.2
Turnout		7,742	83.5	−2.3
Registered electors		9,268		
Liberal Unionist hold		Swing	+2.1	

=== Elections in the 1900s ===
General election 1900: East Somerset
Party	Candidate	Votes	%	±%
Liberal Unionist	Henry Hobhouse	Unopposed		
Liberal Unionist hold				

General election 1906: East Somerset
Party	Candidate	Votes	%	±%
Liberal	John Thompson	4,553	53.9	New
Liberal Unionist	Bertram Falle	3,890	46.1	N/A
Majority		663	7.8	N/A
Turnout		8,443	86.9	N/A
Registered electors		9,717		
Liberal gain from Liberal Unionist				

=== Elections in the 1910s ===
General election January 1910: East Somerset
Party	Candidate	Votes	%	±%
Liberal Unionist	Ernest Jardine	4,997	55.7	+9.6
Liberal	John Thompson	3,970	44.3	−9.6
Majority		1,027	11.4	N/A
Turnout		8,967		
Liberal Unionist gain from Liberal		Swing	+9.6	

General election December 1910: East Somerset
Party	Candidate	Votes	%	±%
Liberal Unionist	Ernest Jardine	4,748	55.1	−0.6
Liberal	John Thompson	3,875	44.9	+0.6
Majority		873	10.2	−1.2
Turnout		8,623		
Liberal Unionist hold		Swing	-0.6	

General Election 1914–15:

Another General Election was required to take place before the end of 1915. The political parties had been making preparations for an election to take place and by July 1914, the following candidates had been selected;

- Unionist: Ernest Jardine
- Liberal: John Thompson
