= Ralph Neville-Grenville =

British Conservative politician

Ralph Neville-Grenville DL, JP (born Ralph Neville; 27 February 1817 – 20 August 1886) was a British Conservative Party politician.

== Background ==
Born Ralph Neville, he was the eldest son of the Very Revd and Hon George Neville-Grenville (Dean of Windsor and son of Richard Griffin, 2nd Baron Braybrooke) and his wife Lady Charlotte Neville-Grenville (née Lady Charlotte Legge, second daughter of George Legge, 3rd Earl of Dartmouth). In 1854, on the death of his father he assumed the additional surname Grenville. Neville-Grenville was educated at Eton College and later Magdalene College, Cambridge, where he graduated with a Master of Arts in 1837. He served in the British Army and was lieutenant-colonel of the West Somerset Yeomanry Cavalry.

== Career ==
Neville-Grenville entered the British House of Commons as Member of Parliament (MP) for Windsor in 1841, representing it until 1847. He sat again for East Somerset from 1865 to 1868, and subsequently for Mid Somerset until his resignation in 1878. In 1846, Neville-Grenville was a Lord of the Treasury. He was appointed High Sheriff of Somerset in 1862 and was a deputy lieutenant and justice of the peace for the same county.

== Family ==
On 18 September 1845, he married Julia Roberta Russell, daughter of Sir Robert Frankland Russell, 7th Baronet at All Souls Church, Langham Place. They had nine children, three daughters and six sons. A son was Admiral George Neville, and a daughter, Agnes, married William Maitland.

Parliament of the United Kingdom
Preceded by John Ramsbottom; Robert Gordon	Member of Parliament for Windsor; 1841–1847; With: John Ramsbottom 1841–1845; George Alexander Reid 1845–1847	Succeeded by George Alexander Reid; Lord John Hay
Preceded by William Knatchbull; Sir William Miles, Bt	Member of Parliament for East Somerset; 1865–1868; With: Richard Horner Paget	Succeeded by Ralph Shuttleworth Allen; Richard Bright
New constituency	Member of Parliament for Mid Somerset; 1868–1878; With: Richard Horner Paget	Succeeded by Richard Horner Paget; William Stephen Gore-Langton
