= Sir Richard Paget, 1st Baronet =

British politician

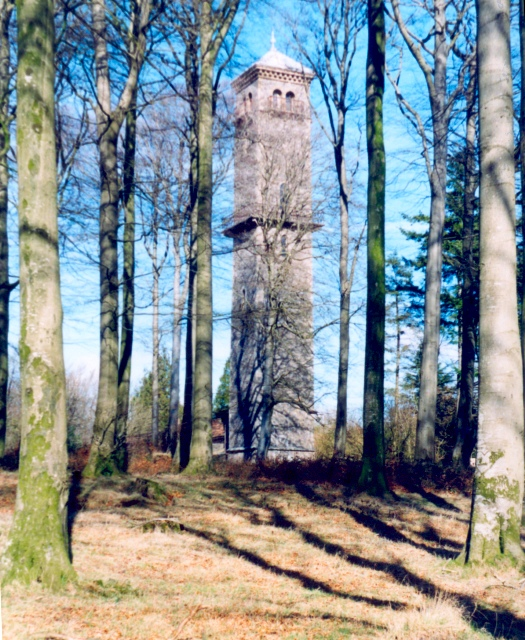
Cranmore Tower was a folly built for Paget's father John Moore Paget.

Sir Richard Horner Paget, 1st Baronet (14 March 1832 – 3 February 1908) was a British Conservative politician who sat in the House of Commons from 1865 to 1895.

Paget was the son of John Moore Paget of Cranmore, Somerset and his wife Elizabeth Jane Doveton. He attended the Royal Military College, Sandhurst and was a captain in the 66th Regiment and Honorary lieutenant-colonel of the 3rd Volunteer Battalion, Prince Albert's (Somersetshire) Light Infantry. He was a J.P. and deputy lieutenant for Somerset.

In the 1865 general election, Paget was elected Conservative Member of Parliament for East Somerset. However, at the 1868 general election, he was elected instead for Mid Somerset and held the seat until it was reorganised under the Redistribution of Seats Act 1885. He was then elected in the 1885 general election as MP for Wells, which he held until the 1895 general election.

Paget was made a Baronet in 1886, and sworn as a Privy Councillor in 1895.

Paget married Caroline Isabel Surtees in 1866. He was succeeded in the baronetcy by his son Richard Paget. His daughter, Dorothy Mary Paget, married the Liberal politician Herbert Gladstone, 1st Viscount Gladstone.

The scientist Brigid Balfour was one of his granddaughters.

Parliament of the United Kingdom
Preceded by William Knatchbull and Sir William Miles, Bt.	Member of Parliament for East Somerset; 1865–1868; With: Ralph Neville Grenville	Succeeded by Ralph Shuttleworth Allen and Richard Bright
New constituency	Member of Parliament for Mid Somerset; 1868–1885; With: Ralph Neville Grenville, to 1878; William Stephen Gore-Langton, 1878–1885; John Wingfield-Digby, 1885	Constituency abolished
New constituency	Member of Parliament for Wells; 1885–1895	Succeeded by Hylton Jolliffe
Baronetage of the United Kingdom
New creation	Baronet (of Cranmore, Somerset); 1868–1908	Succeeded by Richard Paget
