= Ralph Shuttleworth Allen =

British politician

Allen in the 1860s

Ralph Shuttleworth Allen (1817 – 6 February 1887) was a British Conservative Party politician. He was elected as a Member of Parliament (MP) for East Somerset at the 1868 general election, was re-elected unopposed in 1874, and held his seat in the House of Commons until he resigned on 10 March 1879 by becoming Steward of the Manor of Northstead.

Parliament of the United Kingdom
Preceded by Ralph Neville-Grenville; Richard Paget	Member of Parliament for East Somerset; 1868–1879; With: Richard Bright to 1878; Philip Miles from 1878	Succeeded by The Lord Brooke; Philip Miles
