= Richard Bright (politician) =

English politician

Richard Bright (1822 – 28 February 1878) was an English politician.

He was born the son of Robert Bright and the brother of colonial businessman Charles Edward Bright and General Sir Robert Onesiphorus Bright.

He was Conservative member of parliament (MP) for East Somerset from 1868 to 1878.

He was a member of the Bath and County Club.

Parliament of the United Kingdom
Preceded by Ralph Neville-Grenville and Richard Paget	Member of Parliament for East Somerset; 1868–1878; With: Ralph Shuttleworth Allen	Succeeded by Ralph Shuttleworth Allen and Sir Philip Miles, Bt.
