= 1868 United Kingdom general election =

- 17 November – 7 December 1868

All 658 seats in the House of Commons 330 seats needed for a majority
- Turnout: 2,333,251
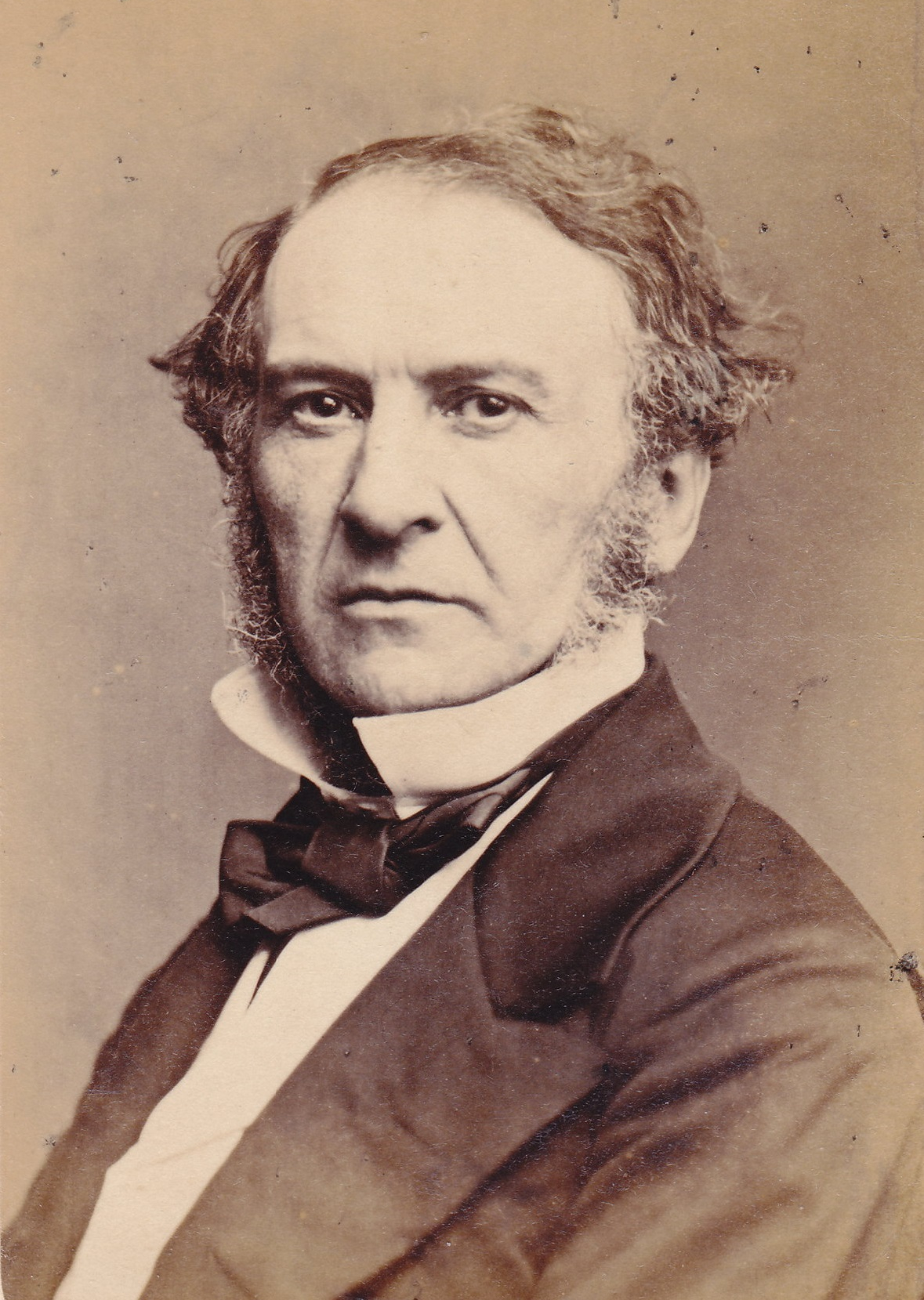

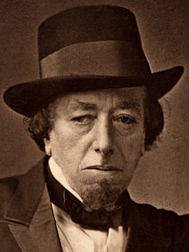
	First party	Second party
Leader	William Gladstone	Benjamin Disraeli
Party	Liberal	Conservative
Leader since	3 December 1868	27 February 1868
Leader's seat	Greenwich (Defeated at South West Lancashire)	Buckinghamshire
Last election	369 seats, 59.5%	289 seats, 40.5%
Seats won	387 (Note: The seat and vote count figures for the Liberals given here include the Speaker of the House of Commons)	271
Seat change	▲18	▼18
Popular vote	1,428,776	903,318
Percentage	61.2%	38.7%
Swing	▲1.7 pp	▼1.8 pp
- Colours denote the winning party

- Composition of the House of Commons after the election
Prime Minister before election
Benjamin Disraeli
Conservative
Prime Minister after
election
William Gladstone
Liberal

The 1868 United Kingdom general election was held between 17 November to 7 December 1868 to elect members of the House of Commons. The Liberal Party, under William Ewart Gladstone, took a majority of seats and defeated the governing Conservative minority government, led by Benjamin Disraeli.

This was the first general election to be held after the passage of the Reform Act 1867, which enfranchised many male householders, thus greatly increasing the number of men who could vote in United Kingdom elections. It was the first election held in the United Kingdom in which more than a million votes were cast; nearly triple the number of votes were cast compared to the previous election in 1865.

The establishment of the Church of Ireland was a dominant issue in the 1868 general election. Earlier that year, the House of Lords blocked the Established Church (Ireland) Bill, which would have imposed restrictions on the Irish Church. Gladstone's Liberal government, which favored disestablishment, used its parliamentary majority to pass the Irish Church Act the following year.

This was the last general election at which all seats were taken by only the two leading parties, although the parties at the time were loose coalitions and party affiliation was not listed on registration papers.

== Results ==

UK General Election 1868
Party	Candidates						Votes		
Party	Stood	Elected	Gained	Unseated	Net	% of total	%	No.	Net %
Liberal	600	387			+18	58.81	61.24	1,428,776	+2.0
Conservative	436	271			−18	41.19	38.71	903,318	−2.1
Others	3	0	0	0	0	0	0.05	1,157	N/A

=== Voting summary ===
Popular vote
Liberal	61.24%
Conservative	38.71%
Others	0.05%

=== Seats summary ===
Parliamentary seats
Liberal	58.81%
Conservative	41.19%
Others	0.0%

=== Regional results ===
==== Great Britain ====
Party	Candidates	Unopposed	Seats	Seats change	Votes	%	% change
Liberal	515	80	321	▲7	1,374,315	61.4	
Conservative	383	65	234	▼10	864,551	38.6	
Other	1	0	0		969	0.0	
Total	899	145	555	▼3	2,239,835	100	

===== England =====
Party	Candidates	Unopposed	Seats	Seats change	Votes	%	% change
Liberal	412	46	244	▼7	1,192,098	59.7	
Conservative	334	54	211	▼2	803,637	40.2	
Other	1	0	0		969	0.1	
Total	747	100	455	▼9	1,996,704	100	

===== Scotland =====
Party	Candidates	Unopposed	Seats	Seats change	Votes	%	% change
Liberal	70	23	51	▲9	125,356	82.5	
Conservative	20	3	7	▼4	23,985	17.5	
Total	90	26	58	▲5	149,341	100	

===== Wales =====
Party	Candidates	Unopposed	Seats	Seats change	Votes	%	% change
Liberal	29	10	23	▲5	52,256	62.1	
Conservative	20	4	10	▼4	29,866	37.9	
Total	49	14	33	▲1	82,122	100	

==== Ireland ====
Party	Candidates	Unopposed	Seats	Seats change	Votes	%	% change
Liberal	85	41	66	▲8	54,461	57.9	+2.3
Irish Conservative	53	26	37	▼8	38,765	41.9	-2.5
Other	2	0	0	Steady	188	0.2	+0.2
Total	140	67	103	Steady	149,341	100	

==== Universities ====
Party	Candidates	Unopposed	Seats	Seats change	Votes	%	% change
Conservative	9	4	6	Steady	7,063	55.4	
Liberal	4	1	3	▲3	4,605	44.6	
Total	13	5	9		11,668	100	

== See also ==
- List of MPs elected in the 1868 United Kingdom general election
