= List of people from Lancaster County, Pennsylvania =

This is a list of notable people who were born, or who have lived in Lancaster County, Pennsylvania.

- William Addams (1777–1858), U.S. representative
- David Hayes Agnew (1818–1892), surgeon
- Chas Alecxih, NFL defensive lineman
- Amish Outlaws, cover band
- Andy Baldwin, U.S. Navy lieutenant and physician, bachelor of season 10 of The Bachelor
- James Buchanan (1791–1868), 15th president of the United States
- Thomas Burch (1778–1849), Methodist circuit rider
- Simon Cameron (1799–1889), secretary of war
- Miles B. Carpenter (1889–1985), sculptor
- Diane Cluck, singer-songwriter
- Lewis Cohen, playing card manufacturer
- Adam Cole, professional wrestler
- Michael Deibert, journalist, author
- Charles Demuth (1883–1935), painter
- Jon Dough (born Chet Anuszak), born in Lancaster
- William Duchman (1809–1881), Wisconsin state legislator and sawmill operator
- Gretchen Egolf, actress, sister of Tristan Egolf
- Tristan Egolf (1971–2005), novelist, author, activist
- Andrew Ellicott (1754–1820), surveyor
- Michael Erlewine, founder of All Media Guide (AMG)
- Andrew J. Feustel, NASA astronaut
- FFH, Contemporary Christian band
- Robert Fulton (1765–1815), engineer, inventor, creator of Clermont steamboat
- Jim Furyk, professional golfer
- Cam Gallagher, professional baseball player
- Gene Garber, Major League Baseball relief pitcher
- Jennifer Gareis, actress and 1994 Miss New York
- Lewis E. Gettle, Wisconsin state assemblyman and lawyer
- Matt Greiner, drummer of metalcore band August Burns Red
- Jonathan Groff, actor and singer who originated role of "Melchior" in the Broadway musical Spring Awakening
- Klaus Grutzka (1923–2011), industrial artist
- Edward Hand (1744–1802), physician, farmer, congressman, general officer in Continental Army during American Revolutionary War
- Tom Herr, MLB second baseman
- Milton S. Hershey (1857–1945), chocolatier, founder of the Hershey Company
- S. Dale High, chairman of High Industries
- Rev. Earl Honaman (1904–1982), suffragan bishop of the Episcopal Diocese of Central Pennsylvania
- The Innocence Mission, band from Lancaster (performed the hit song "Bright as Yellow")
- Travis Jankowski, professional baseball player
- Taylor Kinney, actor and model
- Maria Louise Kirk, painter and illustrator
- Dan Kreider, NFL fullback
- Floyd Landis, professional road bicycle racer
- D. Ross Lederman (1894–1972), film director
- Frank B. McClain (1864–1925), mayor of Lancaster (24th), Pennsylvania, lieutenant governor of Pennsylvania (1914)
- Alexander McNair, first governor of Missouri
- Mike Mentzer, professional bodybuilder
- Thomas Mifflin, merchant, politician, governor of Pennsylvania
- Anna Balmer Myers, author of early 20th-century novels centered in Lancaster County
- Clarence Charles Newcomer (1923–2005), United States federal judge
- Nguyen Chanh Thi (1923–2007), Army of the Republic of Vietnam general, retired to Lancaster
- Karin Olah (born 1977), contemporary painter, collage, and fiber artist
- John Parrish, MLB relief pitcher
- Barry Pearl (born 1950), actor
- Molly Picon (1898–1992), actress, died in Lancaster
- Andrew J. Porter, author
- Peter Reesor (1775–1854), along with family including father Christian Reesor (1747–1806) moved to settled in what is now Markham, Ontario in 1804
- John F. Reynolds (1820–1863), U.S. Army major general, American Civil War
- Keegan Rosenberry, professional soccer player, Philadelphia Union
- Brad Rutter, Jeopardy! champion
- Theodore Emanuel Schmauk (1860–1920), Lutheran theologian, educator
- Frank H. Shaw (1882–1950), civil engineer
- Lloyd Smucker (born 1974), U.S. representative for Pennsylvania
- Pete Snyder, founder of New Media Strategies
- Thaddeus Stevens (1792–1868), U.S. representative, Republican
- John Stockton, Michigan territorial legislator
- Daniel B. Strickler (1897–1992), U.S. Army lieutenant general, lieutenant governor
- Bruce Sutter, Hall of Fame pitcher
- William G. Thompson, mayor of Detroit, Michigan 1881-83
- Julian Valentin, professional soccer player
- Zarek Valentin, professional soccer player
- Junior Vasquez, New York City club DJ, remixer, producer
- Robert S. Walker, U.S. representative, Republican
- Jemima Warner, Continental Army camp follower and first American military person KIA in the Battle of Quebec
- James Weaver, California Angels pitcher
- Andrew Wenger, professional soccer player
- Suzanne Westenhoefer, comedian
- William Whipper (1804–1876), African-American businessman, activist
- Charlotte White (1782–1863), first unmarried American female missionary, arrived in India in 1816
- Marianne Wiggins, author
- Kristen Wiig, actress and comedian
- Michael Willis, character actor
- Richard Winters, U.S. Army paratrooper portrayed in Stephen Ambrose's 1992 book and miniseries Band of Brothers
