= Killing of Jay Abatan =

Unsolved 1999 crime in Brighton, UK

Jay Abatan
- Born: England
- Died: 29 January 1999 (aged 41–42); Brighton
- Occupation: Senior tax advisor
- Children: 2

In the early hours of 24 January 1999, Jay Abatan was attacked outside the Ocean Rooms nightclub in Brighton, United Kingdom. He had been celebrating a promotion at work when an altercation over a taxi resulted in several men assaulting him and his brother, Michael. Abatan was seriously injured, dying of his injuries five days later. The killing is believed to have been racially motivated by Abatan's family and Sussex Police.

No one has been convicted in relation to the attack. Two men were charged with manslaughter and not prosecuted; they instead stood trial for causing actual bodily harm to Michael Abatan, and found not guilty. The investigation of the killing by Sussex Police was later reviewed by two other police forces and major failings were reported. A detective superintendent and two detective inspectors were found guilty of misconduct. Sussex Police closed their investigation in 2013 and the following year it was revealed that a serving police officer had connections to two of the men suspected of killing Abatan. As of 2022, the Abatan family were continuing to ask for justice and their campaign is supported by local Members of Parliament Peter Bottomley and Des Turner, as well as Doreen Lawrence, mother of murdered teenager Stephen Lawrence.

== Early life ==
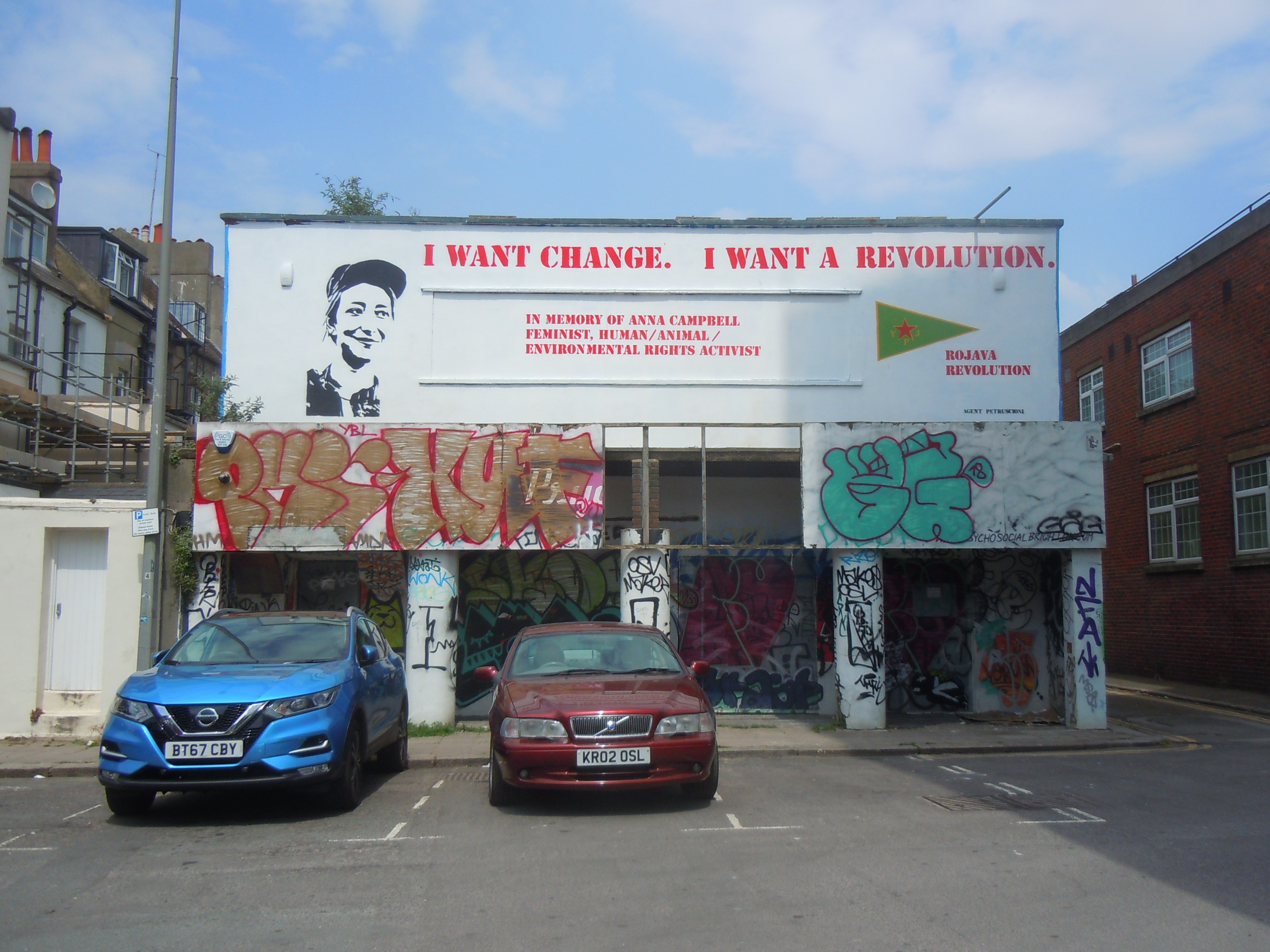
The derelict Ocean Rooms nightclub in 2018

Jay Abatan was born c. 1957 in England and moved to Nigeria when he was six years old. He moved back to England at the age of 18 and became an accountant, working first for the Inland Revenue and then for PricewaterhouseCoopers. He lived in Eastbourne and was engaged to his partner; together they had two children, aged 8 and 9.

== Killing ==
On the night of 24 January 1999, Jay Abatan went out in Brighton with his brother Michael and another friend, intending to celebrate his promotion at work to the position of senior tax advisor. The group went to a wine bar, then to the Ocean Rooms nightclub on Morley Street in Carlton Hill. At 2:30 am, they left the club and called a taxi. When a taxi arrived, the three believed it was for them, so they asked the two men inside it to get out. An altercation occurred with those men and others, in which the two Abatan brothers were assaulted. Jay Abatan was punched twice in the face and fell over, fracturing his skull on the pavement. His brother was kicked and punched as he tried to help him, receiving a black eye. The attackers then left the scene in the same taxi.

Jay Abatan regained consciousness in the ambulance, then slipped into a coma and was taken to the intensive care unit at the nearby Royal Sussex County Hospital, where he died of his injuries five days later. Michael Abatan survived the assault and began a campaign for justice for his brother; the family were convinced that the attack had been racially motivated. Michael Abatan commented in 2019 "all the people that got hit that day were mixed race. No white people got hit". Two men were quickly arrested by Sussex Police and charged with manslaughter. This charge was dropped for lack of evidence and they were also charged with affray and causing actual bodily harm to Michael Abatan; at trial by jury in 2000 they were found not guilty. The judge had not told the jury that Jay Abatan had been killed in the attack. One of the two former suspects committed suicide in 2003. The same year, the Abatan family and Sussex Police offered a reward of £175,000 for any help in finding the killers. No one has been convicted in relation to the attack.

== Reviews of police conduct ==
After the Abatan family campaigned publicly for more information about what had happened on the night, a review was organised by the Essex Police. It ran from July 1999 to December 2000, finding that there had been 57 serious errors made by Sussex Police, including failure to take the details of witnesses and set up a crime scene. The report stated that recommendations about victim liaison made by the Macpherson Report (which was commissioned following the racially motivated murder of Stephen Lawrence), had not been followed. The Sussex force refused to release the full report, but parts were leaked to the press, leading to the force to publicly apologise to the Abatan family and state for the first time that the killing was racially motivated.

Sussex Police then replaced their entire investigation team with 36 new detectives and started a new case under the name Operation Dorchester. The Independent Police Complaints Commission (IPCC) invited another report from Avon and Somerset Police, led by Ken Jones, which again found that Sussex Police had made serious mistakes. Jones then became chief constable of Sussex Police and promised to keep the family informed, although the force refused to release the IPCC report and did not authorise an inquest. After three years, the family received an incomplete copy of the report. In 2005, three police officers were disciplined for blunders made throughout the investigation. A detective superintendent was found guilty of five misconduct charges and was docked nine days' pay; later that year, two detective inspectors were found guilty of misconduct. Doreen Lawrence, the mother of murdered teenager Stephen Lawrence, commented that the errors made by Sussex Police demonstrated that "institutional racism was alive and well in Britain today".

== Later events ==
The Abatan family continued to campaign for justice, supported by local Members of Parliament Peter Bottomley (Worthing West) and Des Turner (Brighton Kemptown). Bottomley supported the Justice for Jay campaign and Turner tabled an early day motion entitled "Death of Jay Abatan" in 2007. In October 2010, an inquest was held after pressure from Abatan's family. The coroner recorded a verdict of unlawful killing, saying that Abatan had been assaulted with two punches to the face in a fight which was "entirely unprovoked and entirely unexplained". The head of the Sussex Criminal Investigation Department told the inquest that the police had interviewed 750 people, including 47 out of a total of 49 visitors to the Ocean Rooms who had been identified from CCTV footage.

It was revealed in 2014 that a serving police officer had been drinking at Ocean Rooms with the two men who were charged with manslaughter, a fact which had not been previously disclosed; Michael Abatan said that he no longer trusted the police. In response, Sussex Police stated there was no evidence that a police officer had been involved in the attack and that the investigation had been closed in 2013. In 2020, Jay Abatan was remembered at a Black Lives Matter march in Brighton and Sussex Police offered a new reward of £10,000 for any information relating to the case. The family of Jay Abatan held a vigil outside Brighton police station on 29 January 2022.

== See also ==
- Black Lives Matter
- List of unsolved murders in the United Kingdom (1990s)
