= Lewis Cohen =

Lewis Cohen may refer to:

- Lewis Cohen (mayor) (1849–1933), South Australian politician and several times mayor of Adelaide
- Lewis Cohen (cardmaker) (1800–1868), major player in the playing card business
- Lewis Cohen, Baron Cohen of Brighton, British politician
