= Simon Hoare =

British politician (born 1969)

Simon Hoare MP
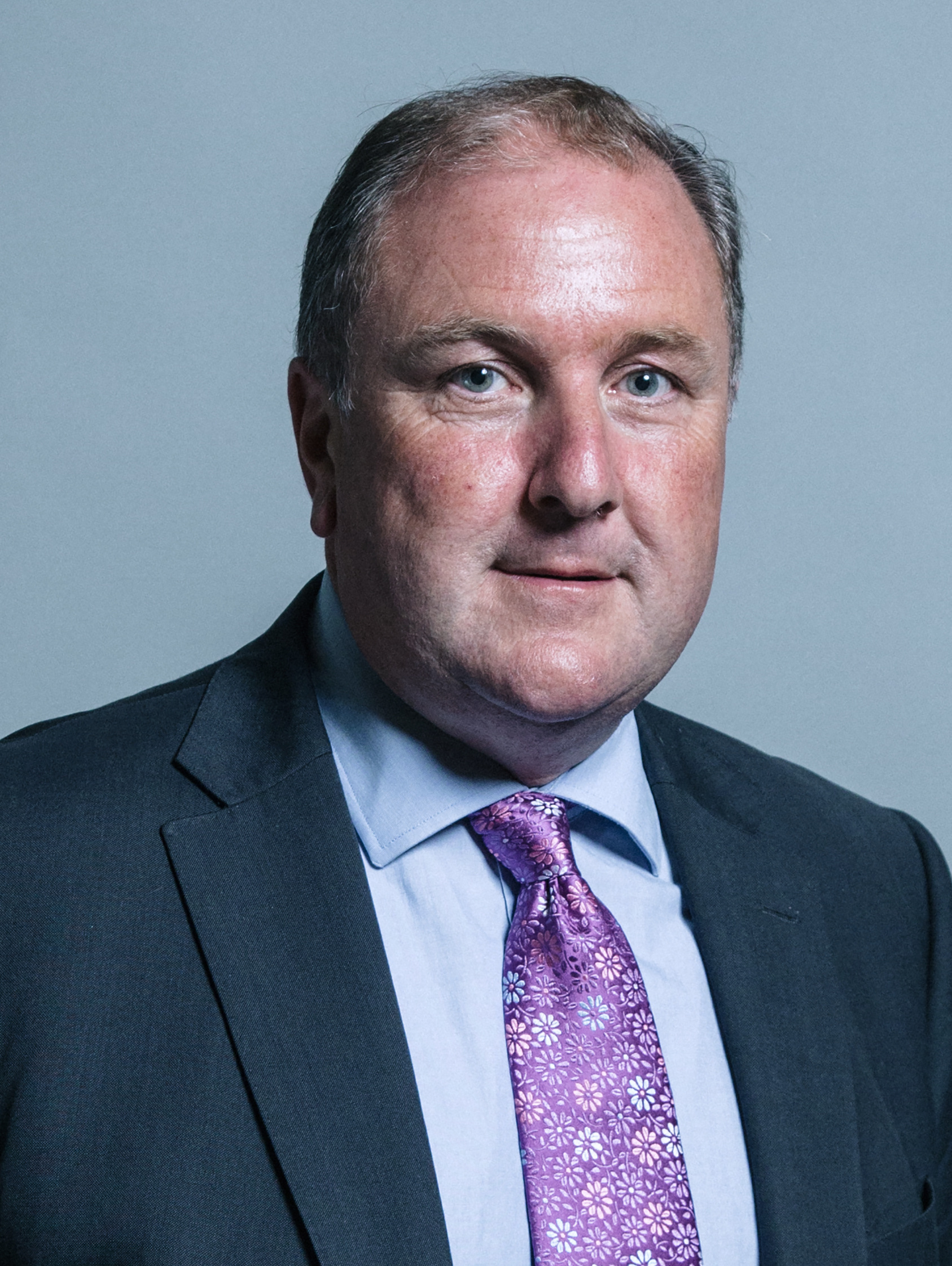
- Official portrait, 2017

Chair of the Public Administration and Constitutional Affairs Select Committee
- Incumbent
- Assumed office 11 September 2024
- Preceded by: Jackie Doyle-Price

Parliamentary Under-Secretary of State for Local Government
- In office 13 November 2023 – 5 July 2024
- Prime Minister: Rishi Sunak
- Preceded by: Lee Rowley
- Succeeded by: Jim McMahon

Chair of the Northern Ireland Affairs Select Committee
- In office 12 June 2019 – 13 November 2023
- Preceded by: Andrew Murrison
- Succeeded by: Robert Buckland

Member of Parliament for North Dorset
- Incumbent
- Assumed office 7 May 2015
- Preceded by: Robert Walter
- Majority: 1,589 (3.1%)

Personal details
- Born: 28 June 1969 (age 57) Cardiff, Wales
- Party: Conservative
- Spouse: Kathryn Hoare
- Children: 3 daughters
- Education: Greyfriars, Oxford

Simon James Hoare (born 28 June 1969) is a British Conservative Party politician who has been the Member of Parliament (MP) for North Dorset since 2015. He was formerly Parliamentary Under-Secretary of State for Local Government from November 2023 until July 2024.

== Early life and career ==
Simon Hoare was born on 28 June 1969 in Cardiff. He was educated at the Bishop Hannon High School, Cardiff, a Roman Catholic comprehensive school, then Greyfriars, Oxford, where he gained a BA degree in Modern History.

Hoare worked at Conservative Central Office before becoming the personal assistant to the Conservative leader of Kingston upon Thames London Borough Council. Hoare has worked as a political officer at the Bow Group and is a member of the Tory Reform Group.

He began his public relations career in the 1990s when he joined Charles Barker. Following that he worked as head of property at Ketchum, as an account director at PPS Group and as an external affairs director at the Environmental Services Association.

Following this, Hoare began his own public relations and lobbying company, Community Connect, of which he was managing director. Following the 2010 general election, Hoare became a director in the public affairs arm of Four Communications.

Hoare has also been a member of the Council of Governors of the South Central Ambulance Service NHS Trust.

Hoare was a Conservative cabinet member on West Oxfordshire District Council, a councillor on Oxfordshire County Council and was also a member of the executive of Witney Conservative Association working alongside the then Prime Minister David Cameron.

== Parliamentary career ==
Hoare stood as the Conservative candidate in Cardiff West at the 1997 general election, coming second with 21.5% of the vote behind the incumbent Labour MP Rhodri Morgan.

At the 2010 general election, Hoare stood in Cardiff South and Penarth, coming second with 28.3% of the vote behind the incumbent Labour MP Alun Michael.

At the 2015 general election, Hoare was elected to Parliament as MP for North Dorset with 56.6% of the vote and a majority of 21,118.

Hoare was opposed to Brexit prior to the 2016 referendum.

Hoare was re-elected as MP for North Dorset at the snap 2017 general election with an increased vote share of 64.9% and an increased majority of 25,777.

In September 2018, Hoare was appointed Parliamentary Private Secretary to the Home Secretary, Sajid Javid.

In June 2019, Hoare was elected as the chair of the Northern Ireland Affairs Select Committee.

Hoare was again re-elected at the 2019 general election, with a decreased vote share of 63.6% and a decreased majority of 24,301.

In May 2020 he asked Dominic Cummings to consider his position as the PM's advisor due to Cummings travelling from London to Durham during a nationwide coronavirus lockdown.

In July 2021 Hoare made a tweet about bonfires that appeared to be mocking Northern Ireland Unionists. The tweet received widespread condemnation.

In November 2021, he was one of 13 Conservative MPs who voted against a government-supported amendment to defer the suspension of Conservative MP Owen Paterson who was found to have breached lobbying rules.

Hoare was re-selected in February 2023 as the Conservative candidate for North Dorset at the 2024 general election.

In May 2023 Hoare was asked to repay four motoring fines of £80 each issued in November 2019, which he had previously claimed on his parliamentary expenses.

At the 2024 general election, Hoare was again re-elected with a decreased vote share of 36.6% and a decreased majority of 1,589.

On 11 September 2024, Hoare was elected Chair of the Public Administration and Constitutional Affairs Select Committee.

On 17 December 2024, Hoare re-joined the Northern Ireland Affairs Select Committee.

=== Election literature ===
In 2015, Private Eye reported that on his election leaflets Hoare said that "My family and I live in the constituency, use local schools and are part of the community". He had only recently moved to the constituency by the time that the leaflets had been distributed. It was stated that he was only selected to contest the seat in January and as late as 11 April 2015, an article in the Bournemouth Daily Echo reported that he was planning to move to the constituency. It was also reported that Hoare told the Bournemouth Daily Echo that he was "not a professional politician", which was contrary to his employment history in various pro-Conservative Party organisations.

He was similarly criticised by the South Wales Echo when he stood in Cardiff South and Penarth at the 2010 general election.

Parliament of the United Kingdom
Preceded by Robert Walter	Member of Parliament for North Dorset; 2015–present	Incumbent
