= Simon Kirby =

British Conservative politician

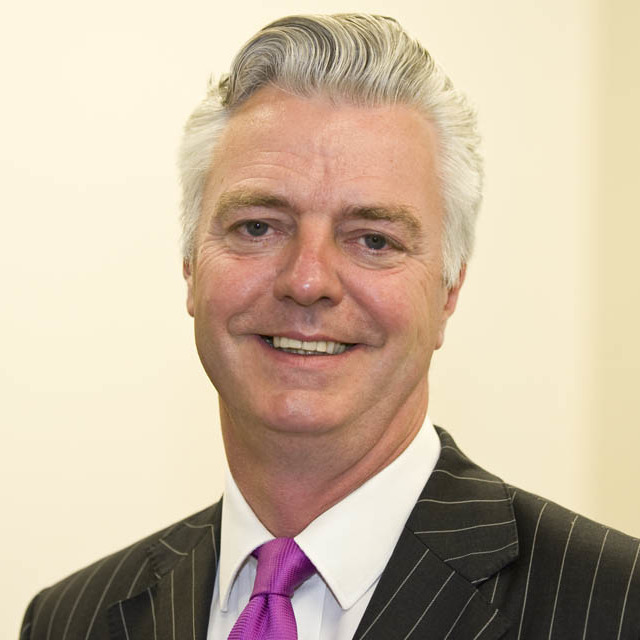
- Kirby in 2016

Economic Secretary to the Treasury City Minister
- In office 17 July 2016 – 8 June 2017
- Prime Minister: Theresa May
- Preceded by: Harriett Baldwin
- Succeeded by: Steve Barclay

Member of Parliament for Brighton Kemptown
- In office 6 May 2010 – 3 May 2017
- Preceded by: Des Turner
- Succeeded by: Lloyd Russell-Moyle

Personal details
- Born: 22 December 1964 (age 61) Hastings, Sussex, England
- Party: Conservative
- Spouse: Elizabeth Kirby
- Children: 6
- Education: Open University; London School of Economics
- Website: simonkirby.org

Simon Gerard Kirby (born 22 December 1964), also known as Simon Radford-Kirby, is a British politician. A member of the Conservative Party, he was elected as the Member of Parliament (MP) for Brighton Kemptown in 2010. In 2016, he was appointed Economic Secretary to the Treasury and City Minister. He lost his seat at the 2017 general election.

== Early life and career ==
Kirby was born in Hastings, Sussex, in 1964. He attended Chantry Infants School, Sandown Primary School and Hastings Grammar School. He has a BSc(Hons) degree in mathematical modelling from the Open University and studied operational research at the London School of Economics. During the 1980s he was involved with the anarchist scene in Hastings and was present at an alternative party organised by anarchists on West Hill for the wedding of Mr Andrew Windsor (Prince Andrew).

Kirby established a number of successful businesses in a variety of industries in the Brighton area, including playing a part in establishing Surf 107, a Brighton independent radio station, later renamed Juice 107.2. He worked with Martin Webb to found the Webb Kirby (later C-Side) pub, restaurant and nightclub chain in the city employing over 200 people. He has been a school governor at a number of schools.

Elected as a councillor in 1992 on Brighton Borough Council, Kirby later also served on Mid Sussex District Council and East Sussex County Council, where he was the cabinet member with responsibility for economic development. He stood down as a councillor in 2009 to concentrate on winning the parliamentary seat of Brighton Kemptown.

== Parliamentary career ==
He was elected to the House of Commons as MP for Brighton Kemptown in the May 2010 general election, with a majority of 1,328, gaining the seat from Labour. He was later listed as one of 20 Conservative MPs said to have "true grit" by the ConservativeHome website.

Following his election to parliament, Kirby became vice-chair of the All Party Parliamentary Group on HIV/AIDS and served on the Business, Innovation and Skills and Administration Select Committees. Since becoming a member of parliament he has also become a patron of the Sussex Beacon and the Sussex & Kent ME/CFS Society.

In 2012, Kirby was appointed as the Parliamentary private secretary (PPS) to the Minister for Sport and Tourism Hugh Robertson. In October 2013, he was promoted to PPS to the Minister of State for the Foreign and Commonwealth Office, also Robertson. In August 2014 Kirby was promoted to the role of PPS to the Secretary of State for Health, Jeremy Hunt.

Following Kirby's re-election at the May 2015 general election, with a reduced majority of 690 votes, but increasing his share of the vote by 2.7%, he was appointed as an Assistant Government Whip on 13 May 2015. Kirby was opposed to Brexit prior to the 2016 European membership referendum.

In July 2016, Kirby was appointed Economic Secretary to the Treasury and City Minister. He was responsible for financial services policy and the overall strategic relationship with UK financial services. This included working with banks, insurance companies and the financial services sector. He also has an interest in pensions and savings. In January 2017, he was stripped of his responsibilities for overseeing Brexit's impact on financial services, amid reports that senior financial executives from the City of London Corporation had expressed concern at his lack of business experience and inability to provide detailed answers and assurances about how the Treasury was handling Brexit. Theresa May, however, told The Argus, that she had "absolute confidence" in Kirby as a strong advocate for Brexit. The prime minister said Kirby was still playing a Treasury role in the negotiations.

== Personal life ==
Kirby is married to Elizabeth and has six children. He supports Brighton & Hove Albion Football Club and is an honorary vice-president of Whitehawk Football Club in his former constituency.

Parliament of the United Kingdom
Preceded by Des Turner	Member of Parliament for Brighton Kemptown; 2010–2017	Succeeded by Lloyd Russell-Moyle
