= Nicholas Baker (politician) =

British politician (1938–1997)

Sir Nicholas Baker
- Baker at PMQs, 1996

Lord Commissioner of the Treasury
- In office 3 December 1990 – 20 July 1994
- Prime Minister: John Major
- Preceded by: Tom Sackville
- Succeeded by: Derek Conway

Member of Parliament for North Dorset
- In office 3 May 1979 – 8 April 1997
- Preceded by: David James
- Succeeded by: Robert Walter

Personal details
- Born: Nicholas Brian Baker; 23 November 1938 Hampshire, England
- Died: 25 April 1997 (aged 58) Hampshire, England
- Party: Conservative
- Spouse: Carol d'Abo (m. 1970)
- Children: 2
- Education: Exeter College, Oxford
- Occupation: Politician, government minister

Sir Nicholas Brian Baker (23 November 1938 – 25 April 1997) was a British Conservative Member of Parliament and government minister.

== Background ==
Baker was born in Hampshire, the son of a military officer. He was educated at Clifton College and Oxford University, and became a solicitor.

== Career ==
After unsuccessfully contesting the safe Labour seat of Peckham in February and October 1974, he represented the parliamentary constituency of North Dorset from 1979 until 1997.

He was also a Home Office junior minister under Michael Howard. In this role, he was involved in blocking Mohamed Al-Fayed's long-running attempts to attain British citizenship and in the widely publicized reprieve of a dog called Dempsey which had been threatened with death under the Dangerous Dogs Act 1991.

Health problems caused Baker to resign his ministerial post, and he announced that he would not re-stand for his parliamentary seat at the 1997 general election. He was knighted during the final weeks of his life.

== Personal life and death ==
In 1970, Baker married to Carol d'Abo, sister of musician & broadcaster Mike d'Abo, and they adopted a son Matthew and a daughter Annabel. Baker was an evangelical Christian. He died from cancer at his home in Hampshire on 25 April 1997, at the age of 58.

Parliament of the United Kingdom
Preceded by David James	Member of Parliament for Dorset North; 1979 – 1997	Succeeded by Robert Walter
