= Howard Johnson (politician) =

British solicitor and politician (1910–2000)

Member of Parliament for Brighton Kemptown
- In office 23 February 1950 – 18 September 1959
- Preceded by: New constituency
- Succeeded by: David James

Personal details
- Born: Howard Sydney Johnson; 25 December 1910
- Died: 13 September 2000 (aged 89)
- Party: Conservative
- Other political affiliations: Liberal (1962–1964)
- Occupation: Solicitor, building society director

Howard Sydney Johnson (25 December 1910 – 13 September 2000) was a British solicitor and building society director who became an unorthodox Conservative Party Member of Parliament. Johnson, who considered himself a radical, espoused many positions which put him outside the mainstream including opposition to fox hunting and support for unilateral nuclear disarmament. After leaving Parliament he passed through the Liberal Party and eventually into supporting the Labour Party.

== Family and education ==
Johnson was a native of Brighton, and was born into a Conservative family. His mother's family had a long connection with Brighton council, having been councillors and aldermen. He went to Brighton College and Highgate School, and then trained as a solicitor; he qualified in 1933.

== Solicitor ==
He set up and became senior partner in a Brighton-based solicitors' partnership, Howard Johnson & McQue, in 1933. Johnson acted mainly as a criminal defence solicitor, taking on hopeless cases and clients whom other solicitors avoided; he was said to have "almost invariably" declined to take a case for the prosecution. While representing suspected murderers and prostitutes, his courtroom behaviour was flamboyant.

== Wartime ==
While still a teenager, Johnson had joined the Territorial Army. He was called into the Royal Artillery in the regular army on the outbreak of war in 1939, and served in North Africa where he was injured in 1943 and invalided out with the rank of Major. Johnson returned to Brighton where he became involved in local politics; at the local elections in November 1945 he was elected as a Conservative to Brighton Borough Council from a ward in Kemp Town. On the council he specialised in housing and worked together with Lewis Cohen (the Mayor, and a Labour councillor) to support a local housing association. Johnson and Cohen also knew each other through business.

== 1950 election ==
The Parliamentary constituency of Brighton had, up to the 1950 general election, consisted of the whole of Brighton and Hove and returned two members. From 1950 it was divided into three single-member constituencies, leaving the new Brighton Kemptown without a sitting member. Johnson was adopted as the Conservative Party candidate for this seat, which was the least Conservative part of the existing seat and where the outcome was thought to be uncertain. He stood down from the council in 1949 to devote more time to fighting the Parliamentary seat.

== Parliament ==
Helped by his second wife, who had been a popular music hall artiste under her maiden name of Betty Frankiss, Johnson won by 3,001 votes. He made his maiden Parliamentary speech in May 1950, on the subject of controls on housing, about which he had professional experience as a director of land and property development companies. Johnson opposed restrictions except to control the size of new homes. Taking up a constituency interest, in June 1950 he called for reform of the licensing laws.

== Local campaigns ==
At the 1951 general election, Johnson found his Labour opponent was his friend Lewis Cohen. He increased his majority to over 5,000. In November 1953, Johnson prompted laughter in the House of Commons with a question to the Secretary of State for War asking whether he would employ troops to clear seaweed from the south coast to exterminate the breeding grounds for a new type of fly, Coelopa frigida. Johnson claimed that the flies were advancing on London and urged the use of troops with powerful flame-throwers. He was in touch with his constituents in urging restrictions on the sale of obscene postcards, and in calling for action against 'Teddy Boys'.

== Grand National campaign ==
Johnson began a campaign against animal cruelty in 1954 when he first tabled a motion about the death of four horses in that year's Grand National. Johnson asked for Parliamentary time for a debate on the subject and was rebuffed. He then raised the question in an adjournment debate, pointing out that in the last five Grand Nationals, out of 192 horses which had started, only 36 had finished and nine had had to be killed. Johnson called for an inquiry and demanded the end of heavy whipping. Johnson was in a minority of 32 Conservative MPs to support an increase in the Parliamentary salary in May 1954; the issue caused some concern among his constituents but the executive council of Kemptown (Brighton) Conservative Association passed a unanimous vote of confidence in him.

== Police corruption ==
It was only after winning re-election in 1955, again against Lewis Cohen, that Johnson became more controversial. He began to feed information about local police corruption to a team from Scotland Yard investigating it, which caused annoyance. He kept up the pressure and in 1957 a major inquiry was called into bribery and corruption, which involved officers running protection rackets among Brighton bookmakers and nightclubs. Early in 1956 Johnson backed moves to end capital punishment, and when constituents complained he replied by inviting them to choose "a mere robot" instead. His outspokenness and dedication to constituency work meant that he was reckoned to have a substantial 'personal vote' of constituents who would vote for him despite not supporting his party.

Only four horses finished the 1957 Grand National. Johnson deplored this outcome, and he also became vocal in condemning deer hunting after learning that a hind had been drowned by the Devon and Somerset Staghounds after being hunted for five hours. Johnson described it as disgraceful and a practice "which prevents our calling ourselves a civilised nation"; with many Conservative MPs supporting hunting, his remarks had a cool reception.

== Radical campaigner ==
Johnson announced his decision to stand down from Parliament in April 1957, saying that he found it too difficult to continue as a solicitor and an MP. However, behind his decision was that he had ceased to support the Conservative Party (although in all his time in Parliament he never broke the Conservative whip). Johnson was increasingly distressed by his clashes with Conservative colleagues over animal rights issues (later claiming to have been "sent to Coventry" by colleagues), but also regarded the Conservative Party as having taken a shift to the right which he could not support; he described himself as a "radical".

In his last year in Parliament, Johnson again took up against the Grand National after the 1959 race saw only four finishers and one horse put down after breaking its back at Becher's Brook. He sent a telegram to Home Secretary Rab Butler denouncing the "massacre of horses" and demanding immediate legislation to either ban the race or to change the rules so as to remove all danger.

== Animal rights campaigns ==
After leaving Parliament, Johnson continued as a local solicitor, and directed his political energies towards animal rights campaigning. He worked with Donald Chapman, a Labour MP, going to campaign against fox hunts, which outraged the huntsman. On 29 October 1959 the Southdown hunt with 14 hounds charged into Johnson's 3-acre (1.2 ha) garden at Ditchling in Sussex, wrecking the hedges and damaging crops. When one huntsman dismounted and advanced on Johnson brandishing his riding crop and threatening to "teach him a lesson", Johnson urged the man to hit him and promised to keep his hands behind his back if he did. Johnson remarked "I told him it would suit me admirably if he hit me, as it would show others what hunting people are like." Instead the man rode off.

Johnson worked with others in the Royal Society for the Prevention of Cruelty to Animals to try to persuade it to condemn fox hunting. The society disapproved of the campaign and in 1961 decided to purge itself of the leaders. Johnson was summoned before a special council in July 1961 and asked to explain his "conduct prejudicial to the society"; the outcome was his expulsion. He moved on to the League Against Cruel Sports of which he became Vice-President; he supported direct action by squatting in the roads in front of hunts, arguing that the result of any protesters being killed was that the huntsman "stand a very fine chance of hanging or imprisonment".

== Later politics ==
Having joined the Liberal Party in 1962, Johnson was adopted as their candidate for the Brighton Pavilion constituency. However, he soon resigned the candidature. After the 1964 general election he rejoined the Conservative Party, arguing that the party in opposition was rethinking its policy in a "radically more progressive" direction which was in line with his ideas. He offered himself for selection again as the Conservative candidate for Kemptown in 1965; the executive of the association declined to shortlist him but were over-ruled by the membership at large. In the final selection the local party rejected Johnson.

In 1965 he contributed to Patrick Moore's book "Against Hunting". His political stances became more left-wing, as he joined the Campaign for Nuclear Disarmament, and dismayed his colleagues in the property development business by opposing the Brighton bypass road. In the 1980s he became a supporter of the Labour Party.

== Retirement ==
Johnson rounded off his business career as a director of the Alliance Building Society from 1960 to 1983, prior to its merger into the Alliance & Leicester. He retired to the Isle of Man where he was a director of the Alliance & Leicester's local branch from 1992 to 1996.

Parliament of the United Kingdom
New constituency	Member of Parliament for Brighton Kemptown; 1950 – 1959	Succeeded by David James
