= Dennis Hobden =

Dennis Harry Hobden (21 January 1920 – 20 April 1995) was a British Labour Party politician.

Hobden was a postal and telegraph worker who became an officer in the Union of Post Office Workers. Before being selected to contest the Brighton Kemptown seat, he was the chairman of the local Constituency Labour Party.

In 1964 Hobden was elected MP for Brighton Kemptown by a margin of seven votes, defeating incumbent David James and becoming the first Labour MP for a Sussex constituency. He was re-elected in 1966 but lost his seat in 1970 to the Conservative Andrew Bowden. In 1974, Hobden attempted to regain the seat in both the February and October general elections, but was unsuccessful.

Parliament of the United Kingdom
Preceded by David James	Member of Parliament for Brighton Kemptown; 1964–1970	Succeeded by Sir Andrew Bowden
