= Chris Ward (British politician) =

British politician (born 1982)

Chris Ward MP
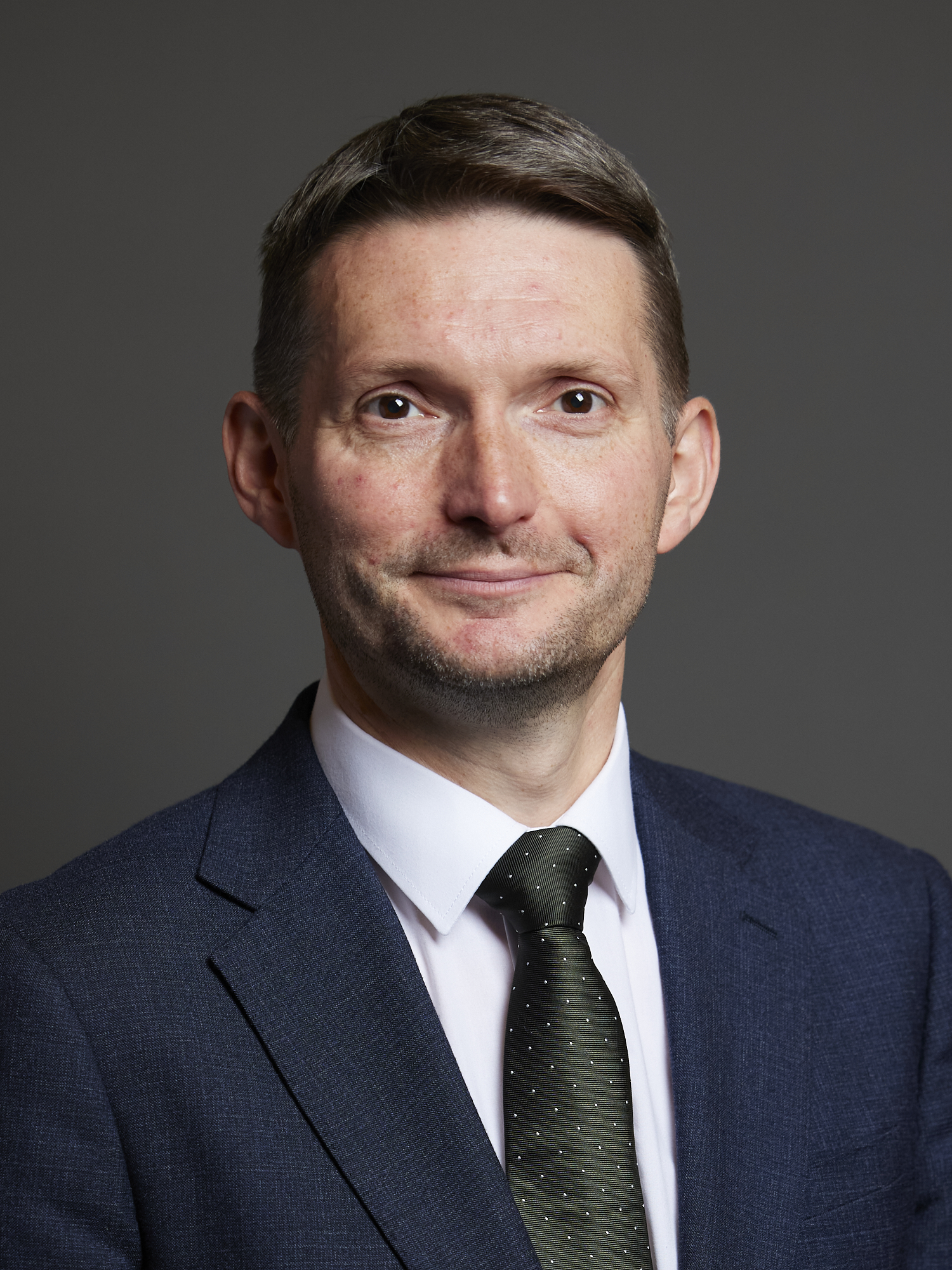
- Official portrait, 2024

Parliamentary Secretary for the Cabinet Office
- In office 6 September 2025 – 22 July 2026 Serving with Satvir Kaur, Josh Simons (until February 2026), Ruth Anderson (from March 2026), James Frith (from 2026)
- Prime Minister: Keir Starmer
- Preceded by: Georgia Gould; Abena Oppong-Asare

Parliamentary Private Secretary to the Prime Minister
- In office 17 July 2024 – 6 September 2025 Serving with Liz Twist
- Prime Minister: Keir Starmer
- Preceded by: Craig Williams
- Succeeded by: Abena Oppong-Asare

Member of Parliament for Brighton Kemptown and Peacehaven
- Incumbent
- Assumed office 4 July 2024
- Preceded by: Lloyd Russell-Moyle
- Majority: 9,609 (23.8%)

Personal details
- Born: Christopher David Ward; 1982 (age 43–44) West Sussex, England
- Party: Labour
- Education: Warwick University (BA); New College, Oxford (MPhil)

Christopher David Ward (born 1982) is a British Labour Party politician who serves as Member of Parliament for Brighton Kemptown and Peacehaven since 2024.

== Early life and education ==
Ward was born in 1982 and grew up at Southwick, West Sussex, to parents hailing from Peacehaven, East Sussex.

He joined the Labour Party at the age of 18. He read History & Politics at the University of Warwick, graduating BA, before pursuing postgraduate studies in Political Theory at New College, Oxford (MPhil).

== Career ==
=== Early career ===
Ward became a parliamentary researcher after graduating from Oxford and spent 6 years working for Sir Keir Starmer. From 2015, Ward was employed as Starmer's speechwriter and political advisor. Following Starmer's victory in the 2020 Labour Party leadership election, Ward became one of Starmer's closest advisors as part of a group branded by backbencher Labour MPs the "gang of five" which included Morgan McSweeney and Jenny Chapman. Ward went on to become the Deputy Chief of Staff to Starmer before leaving his advisory role in July 2021.

After leaving his advisory role, Ward worked for Hanbury Strategy as a director starting in January 2022. Hanbury Strategy is a registered lobbying firm and political and public affairs consultancy agency, where he led the section dedicated to the Labour Party. During his time at the company, Hanbury advised clients including Amazon, Deliveroo, Flutter, UBS, Blackstone and Rockhopper among others. During this time, Ward wrote an article for a Conservative political publication The Spectator.

=== Parliamentary selection ===
Ward was selected as prospective parliamentary candidate for Brighton Kemptown and Peacehaven following the suspension of Lloyd Russell-Moyle from the Labour Party regarding allegations dating back to 2016. According to left-wing political commentator Owen Jones, Ward had expressed an interest in becoming a Member of Parliament in the Brighton area many years previously. The suspension of Russell-Moyle triggered an emergency meeting the next day, immediately following which Ward was announced as Labour's new candidate. More than 200 members of the local Labour Party protested against the method of Ward's selection, and Nancy Platts former Leader of Brighton and Hove City Council questioned the fairness of the process. His Labour general election campaign launch was interrupted by pro-Palestinian activists protesting against the Israeli invasion of the Gaza Strip, with Ward accused of being a parachute candidate. Considered to be on the right of the Labour Party, Ward is a supporter of "Starmerism".

=== In government ===
Ward was appointed Parliamentary Secretary for the Cabinet Office in 2025. He left the government when Andy Burnham became prime minister.

== Personal life ==
Ward is a supporter of Brighton & Hove Albion FC.

Parliament of the United Kingdom
Preceded by Lloyd Russell-Moyle	Member of Parliament for Brighton Kemptown and Peacehaven; 2024–present	Incumbent
