= David James (British MP) =

British politician

David James MBE DSC
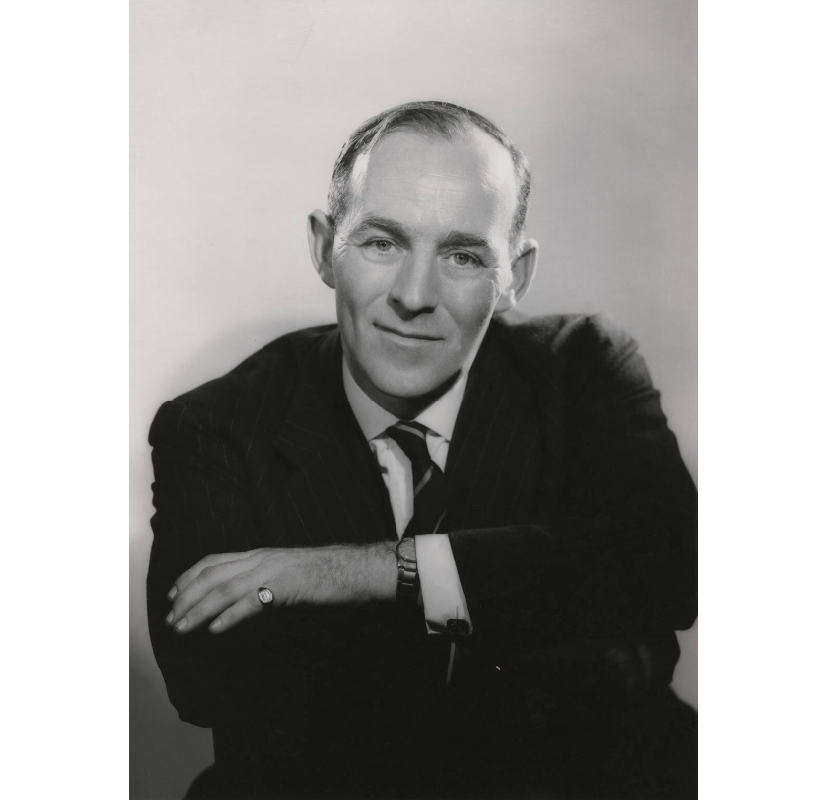

Member of Parliament for Brighton Kemptown
- In office 8 October 1959 – 25 September 1964
- Preceded by: Howard Johnson
- Succeeded by: Dennis Hobden

Member of Parliament for North Dorset
- In office 18 June 1970 – 7 April 1979
- Preceded by: Richard Glyn
- Succeeded by: Nicholas Baker

Personal details
- Born: David Pelham James; 25 December 1919
- Died: 15 December 1986 (aged 66)
- Party: Conservative
- Spouse: Jaquetta Digby (1950–1986; his death)
- Relations: Archibald James (father)
- Children: 6
- Education: Eton College
- Occupation: Politician, author, adventurer

Military service
- Allegiance: United Kingdom
- Branch/service: Royal Navy
- Years of service: 1939–1945
- Rank: Lieutenant
- Commands: Motor Gun Boat 79

David Pelham Guthrie-James (25 December 1919 – 15 December 1986) was a British Conservative Party politician, author and adventurer.

== Biography ==
=== Early life and education ===
James was born in 1919, the oldest son of Sir Archibald James and Bridget James Miller (née Guthrie). He went first to Summer Fields School in Oxford and then Eton. He left Eton at the age of 17, sailing round the world "before the mast" in the 4-masted barque Viking as a trainee officer. He then joined his father on a trip to Spain where he observed the ongoing Spanish Civil War. In 1938 he went up to Balliol College, Oxford, to read geography, but left after four terms to join the RNVR, having been awarded an honorary wartime degree.

=== Wartime service ===
In June 1940, James became a midshipman on HMS Drake. Later on he served on an armed merchant cruiser patrolling the Denmark Strait. In December 1941, he became the second in command of Motor Gun Boat No.63 operating out of Felixstowe. In the early hours of Sunday 28 February 1943, his then vessel MGB 79, was sunk in action off the Hook of Holland. James and three of his crew were rescued from the water by a German trawler and were taken prisoner, later earned the DSC for this action. He was sent to Marlag O, the naval prisoner-of-war camp near Westertimke.

He attempted to escape in December 1943, slipping out of the shower block on a foggy morning, then crossed Germany wearing his full British naval uniform, but with forged papers identifying him as "I. Bagerov" of the Bulgarian Navy. This name was chosen as a joke, so that when asked who he was he would reply “Bugger off”. James made it as far as the port of Lübeck and had made contact with the crew of a Swedish ship willing to smuggle him out of the country before he was arrested, and returned to the camp. His second escape in late 1944 used the same method, relying on the corrupt shower-block guards not to report their own short head-count. James again headed for the Baltic coast, posing as a merchant seaman, and this time made it to Sweden. His successful escape earned him an Order of the British Empire and a spot at the Naval Intelligence Division where he lectured his colleagues on escape methods. Believing that his experience would be of no use in the Middle East where he was to be transferred he joined Operation Tabarin in 1944, wintering in Graham Land until January 1946. In consequence, the James Nunatak was named after him by the British Antarctic Survey.

A self-penned account of his 11 months in (and out of) the camp was published in the UK as A Prisoner's Progress in Blackwood's Magazine (1946–7), then in book form by Blackwoods in 1947, with a second edition in 1954 and in the U.S. under the title Escaper's Progress. A review at the time described the work as "one of the better escape books". In 1978, when the book was re-published in the UK in paperback as Escaper's Progress (Corgi), his original account of the escape, as prepared for Naval Intelligence Division was included as an appendix, having become de-classified. This has again been republished by Pen & Sword Ltd.

=== Post-war career ===
James was then chosen to act as Polar Adviser to director Charles Frend for the 1948 film production of Scott of the Antarctic, during which he appeared as John Mills' "body double" in a number of long shots in the snow. Never one to miss a book opportunity, James wrote Scott of the Antarctic: The Film and Its Production which was published by Lon Convoy, followed a year later, in 1949, by That Frozen Land: The Story of a Year in the Antarctic. Being the only near contemporary account of Operation Tabarin That Frozen Land avoided referring to its geopolitical objectives.

James was asked by George G. Harrap and Co. to co-edit, with James Lennox Kerr, a book of wartime stories and experiences of RNVR members entitled Wavy Navy – By Some Who Served. (1950), and was then chosen by the daughter of Lord Roberts of Kandahar to write her father's biography, published by Hollis & Carter under the title Lord Roberts (1954).

In 1957 James wrote a book entitled Outward Bound, with a foreword by the Duke of Edinburgh, about the Outward Bound organisation, and in 1960 co-edited, with The Field editor Wilson Stephens, In Praise of Fox Hunting, a series of essays by contributors such as Dick Francis, Jimmy Edwards and BBC show jumping commentator Dorian Williams.

In 1962, weeks before the birth of his youngest son, he featured on This Is Your Life, having been ambushed at Victoria Station by Eamonn Andrews and his red book, getting off the train from his home town of Haywards Heath.

Although born into a Church of England family, he was a director of Catholic publishing house Burns & Oates, having been received into the church whilst a POW.

He was Member of Parliament for Brighton Kemptown from 1959 to 1964, when he lost, after a record seven recounts, by just 7 votes to Labour's Dennis Hobden (the first Labour MP for a Sussex constituency). James was subsequently elected as MP for North Dorset in 1970 and he served as member for that seat until his retirement in 1979, when he was succeeded by Sir Nicholas Baker. In the 1964 election when he lost his Brighton seat, his view was that his campaign was sabotaged by extreme left wing infiltrators, in revenge for the assistance he had given to the exposure of ballot rigging in the Electrical Trades Union.

== Personal life ==
On 20 May 1950, James married Jaquetta Mary Theresa (née Digby) (28 October 1928 – 22 February 2019), youngest daughter of Edward Digby, 11th Baron Digby, and sister of Pamela Harriman and Edward Digby, 12th Baron Digby. They had six children, four sons and two daughters, born between 1951 and 1962. In 1979 he changed his name to David Guthrie-James to mark the connection between Clan Guthrie and his family home Torosay Castle on the Isle of Mull.

Interested in the existence of the Loch Ness Monster, he co-founded the Loch Ness Phenomena Investigation Bureau with naturalist Sir Peter Scott in 1962.

His friend John Robson wrote his biography which was published under the title One Man in His Time (Spellmount Ltd. 1998).

Parliament of the United Kingdom
Preceded by Howard Johnson	Member of Parliament for Brighton Kemptown; 1959–1964	Succeeded by Dennis Hobden
Preceded by Sir Richard Glyn	Member of Parliament for North Dorset; 1970–1979	Succeeded by Sir Nicholas Baker
