= Robert Walter (politician) =

British-Turkish politician

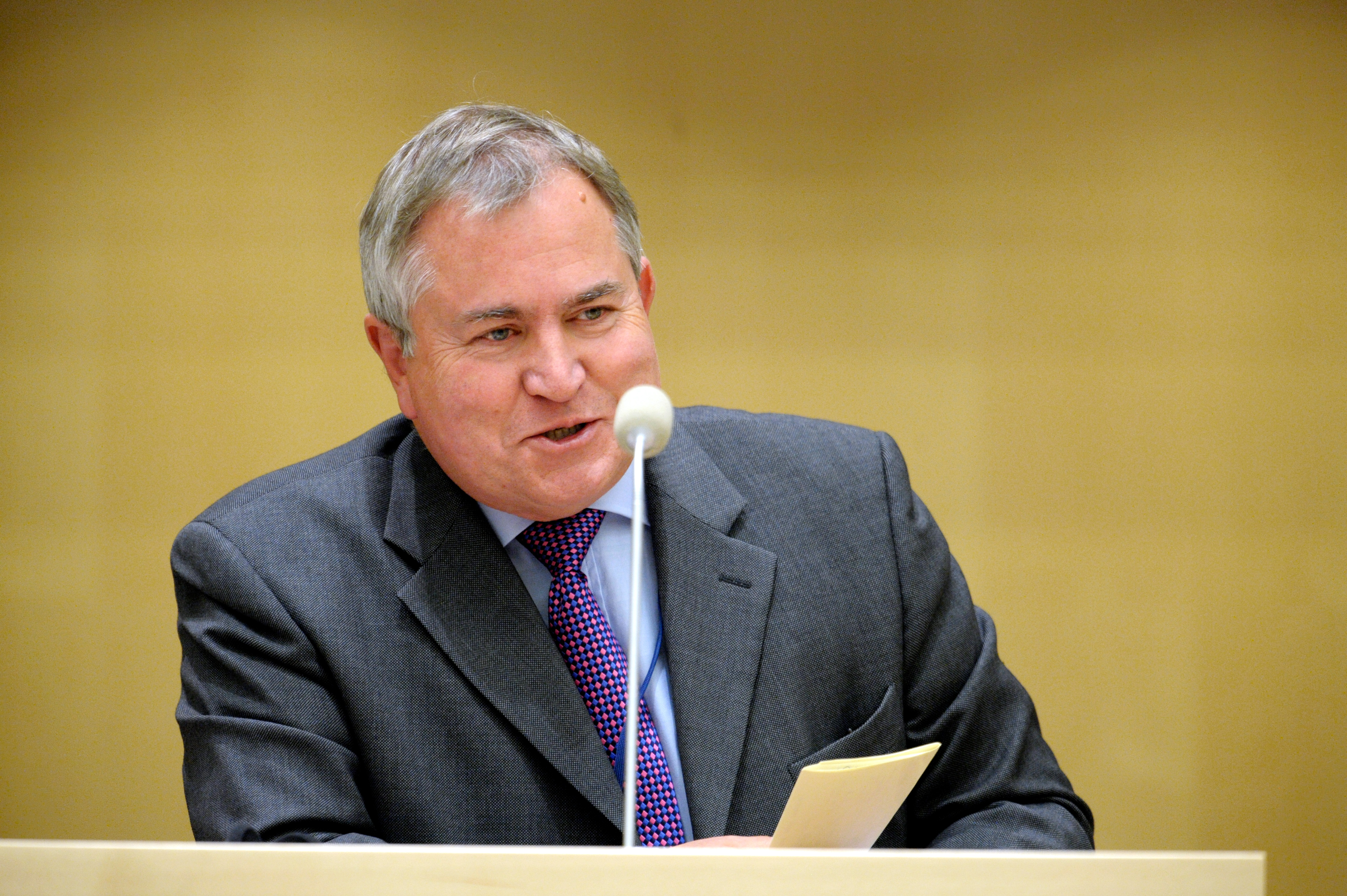

Member of Parliament for North Dorset
- In office 1 May 1997 – 30 March 2015
- Preceded by: Nicholas Baker
- Succeeded by: Simon Hoare

Personal details
- Born: Robert John Walter; 30 May 1948 (age 78) Swansea, Glamorgan, Wales
- Party: Conservative
- Spouse(s): Sally Middleton (1970–1995; her death); Barbara Nutt (Gorna) (2000–2006); Feride Alp (2011–present)
- Children: 3
- Education: Aston University

Robert "Bob" John Walter (born 30 May 1948) is a British-Turkish Conservative Party politician. He was the Member of Parliament (MP) for North Dorset from 1997 until he stood down at the 2015 general election.

He has been president of the European Security and Defence Association since 2011. He was president of the Berlin Security Conference in 2012, 2013 and 2014, and remains a member of the BSC Steering Board. He was elected President of Eurodefense - United Kingdom in July 2021

== Early life ==
Robert Walter was born in 1948; he was educated at Colston's School, Bristol, Lord Weymouth's School, Warminster, and Aston University, from which he gained a BSc degree in 1971.

Walter's political career began as chairman of the Aston University Conservative Association between 1967 and 1969 and chairman of Westbury Constituency Young Conservatives from 1973 until 1976. He was Parliamentary candidate for Bedwellty in 1979.

Prior to his election in 1997, Walter served as chairman of the Conservative Foreign Affairs Forum (1986–88) and chairman of the Conservative Group for Europe (1992–95). He has been a member of the National Union of Conservative and Unionist Associations executive committee (1992–95) and has served as a member of the Carlton Club political committee.

Before entering Parliament in 1997, Walter was an international banker and sheep farmer in Devon. He is a former member of the London Stock Exchange and was a director of Aubrey G Lanston & Co Inc.

== Parliamentary career ==
In December 2002, he faced a no-confidence vote, which was overwhelmingly defeated, from a group of Eurosceptics in his local party, over his pro-European views.

In November 2010, Walter was appointed by the prime minister, David Cameron, to head the United Kingdom delegation to the Parliamentary Assembly of the Council of Europe. Walter was first appointed as an ordinary member of the assembly in 2002 and has previously chaired its committee dealing with media issues and freedom of the press. He also served for two years as senior vice-chairman of its Economic Affairs and Development Committee. He was elected vice-president of the Parliamentary Assembly and chairman of the European Democrat Group, the third largest political group in the Assembly.

Walter served as chair of the British Group of the Inter-Parliamentary Union (IPU), 2010–13. He was elected to the executive committee of the IPU in 2014, and was subsequently nominated by that committee as a vice-president of the IPU.

At Westminster, Walter served as a member of the Health Select Committee (1997–99), International Development Committee (2001–03) and the Treasury Committee (2003–05). He was a member of the Conservative 1922 Committee from 2002 to 2005, having previously served as vice-chairman of the Backbench Agriculture Committee (1997–99) and secretary of the European Affairs Committee (1997–2001). From June 1999 to September 2001, he was Conservative frontbench spokesman for Constitutional affairs and for Wales.

In February 2000, he introduced the Sex Discrimination (Amendment) Bill, which failed to make progress. In 2004, he introduced the Restricted Byways Bill, the provisions of which have now been adopted by the Government. His last bill, introduced in 2006, was the House of Commons (Participation) Bill, which proposed to limit the consideration of English business in the House to English MPs (known as EVEL).

From 1997 onwards, he was a member of the British Irish Parliamentary Assembly (formerly the British Irish Inter-Parliamentary Body), and subsequently served as vice-chairman of the Assembly and chairman of its European Affairs Committee.

In 2008, Walter was elected president of the European Security and Defence Assembly, formerly the Assembly of the Western European Union (WEU). He held that post until the WEU was wound up, and the legal basis for the Assembly, the "modified" Brussels Treaty, ended in June 2011.

Walter was blacklisted by Russia as one of 89 European individuals after he condemned the Russian invasion of Crimea and the annexation of Crimea. He also takes a strong interest in the Balkans, Turkey, Armenia and Azerbaijan. He has publicly defended some of these countries' democratic progress, and has criticised the Azerbaijani government for its human rights record.

He was a leading member of several All-Party Parliamentary Groups, including vice-chairman of the Human Rights Group and the Prison Health Group. Walter was treasurer of the British Japan, British Caribbean and the Parliamentary Rugby Union groups; he was also vice-commodore of the House of Commons Yacht Club.

Walter is a visiting lecturer in East-West Trade at the University of Westminster.

== Personal life ==
Walter was chairman of the Governors of Tachbrook School from 1980 to 1999. He was made a Freeman of the City of London in 1993 and a Liveryman of the Worshipful Company of Needlemakers in 1983.

In July 2011, he was awarded an honorary doctorate, D.Litt., by his alma mater, Aston University.

He married Sally Middleton in 1970 in Warminster, being married for 25 years until her death in 1995. He has three children, Elizabeth, Charles, and Alexander. From 2000 to 2006, he was married to Barbara Nutt (Gorna). In 2011, he married Feride Alp.

In December 2014, it was announced that he would not be seeking re-election in May 2015.

In May 2015, he was granted Turkish citizenship, thus affording him dual nationality.

Parliament of the United Kingdom
Preceded by Nicholas Baker	Member of Parliament for North Dorset; 1997–2015	Succeeded by Simon Hoare
