= Lloyd Russell-Moyle =

British politician (born 1986)

Lloyd Russell-Moyle FRSA
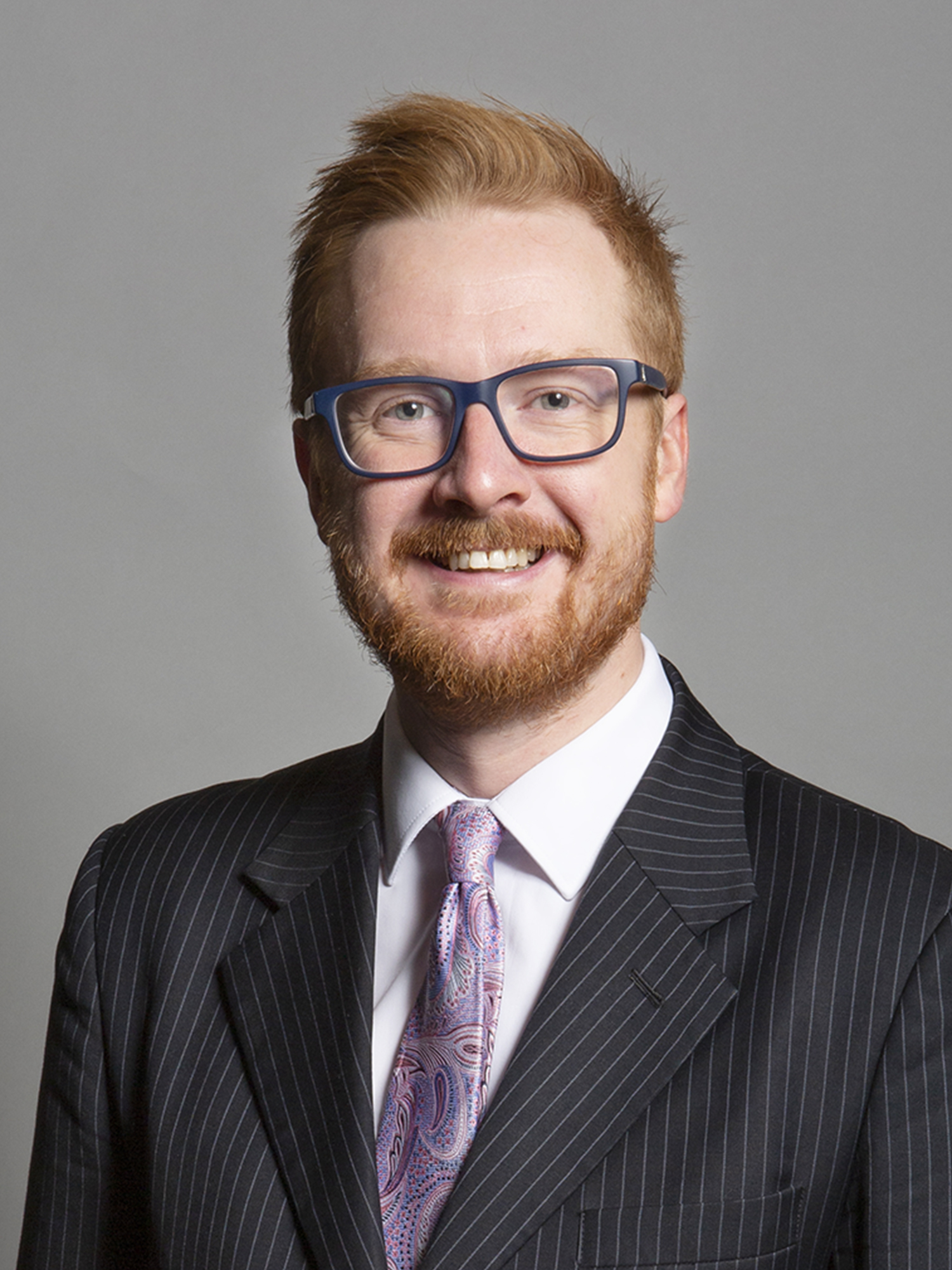
- Official portrait, 2019
- Born: Lloyd Cameron Russell-Moyle; 14 September 1986 (age 40); Brighton, East Sussex, England
- Education: University of Bradford (BA); University of Sussex (LLM)
- Occupations: Politician, youth work administrator
- Political party: Green Party of England and Wales (since 2025)
- Other political affiliations: Labour Co-op (2005-2025); Socialist Campaign Group (2017-2024)

General Secretary (CEO) for Woodcraft Folk
- Incumbent
- Assumed office 2 August 2025
- Preceded by: Debs McCahon

Member of Parliament for Brighton Kemptown
- In office 8 June 2017 – 30 May 2024
- Preceded by: Simon Kirby
- Succeeded by: Chris Ward

Member of Brighton and Hove City Council for East Brighton
- In office 4 August 2016 – 27 December 2017
- Preceded by: Maggie Barredell
- Succeeded by: Nancy Platts

Lloyd Cameron Russell-Moyle (born 14 September 1986) is a British politician and youth work administrator who has served as General Secretary (CEO) of the Woodcraft Folk since August 2025.

He was Member of Parliament (MP) for Brighton Kemptown from 2017 to 2024. Formerly a member of the Labour and Co-operative Party, he was also a member of Brighton and Hove City Council from 2016 to 2017. He joined the Green Party of England and Wales in November 2025.

== Early life and education ==
Lloyd Cameron Russell-Moyle was born on 14 September 1986 in Brighton, England.

He was educated at Wallands Primary School, Priory School, Lewes, and Sussex Downs College.

He studied at the University of Bradford graduating in conflict resolution at the Department of Peace Studies and the University of Sussex, where he graduated with a Masters in international law.

Russell-Moyle has worked for the Woodcraft Folk's international movement, International Falcon Movement – Socialist Educational International (IFM-SEI), and the National Youth Agency. He has held board positions with the European Youth Forum, serving as its Vice-President based in Brussels, the British Youth Council, and the Woodcraft Folk, which he chaired, as well as a number of local youth organisations.

== Political career ==
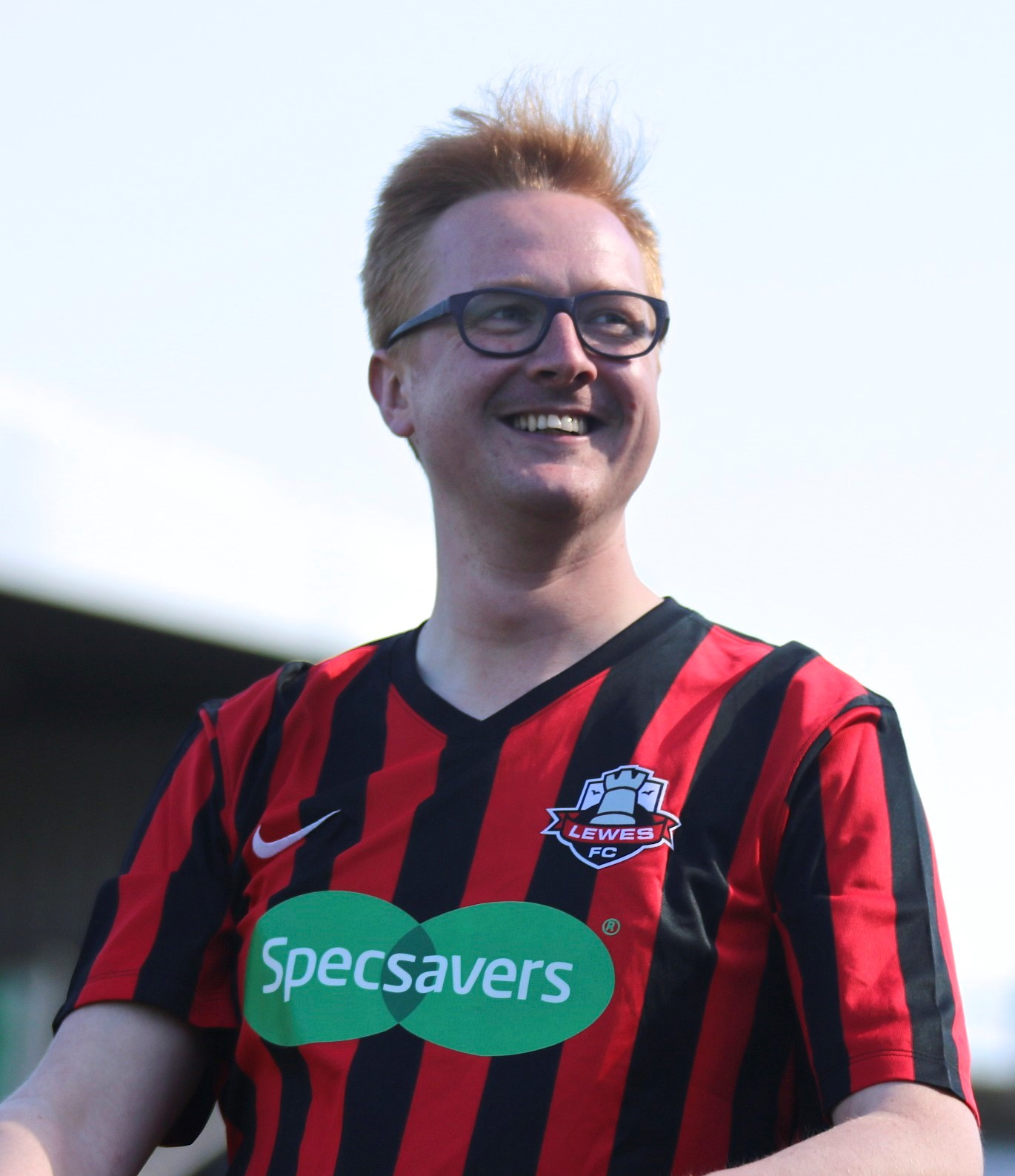
Russell-Moyle in 2015

Russell-Moyle unsuccessfully stood at the 2015 general election in Lewes, coming fourth with 9.9% of the vote behind the winning Conservative candidate Maria Caulfield, the incumbent Liberal Democrat MP Norman Baker, and the UKIP candidate Ray Finch.

He was elected and served as a councillor on Brighton and Hove City Council in August 2016. Following his election to Parliament, Russell-Moyle resigned from the Council in December 2017.

At the snap 2017 general election, Russell-Moyle was elected to Parliament as MP for Brighton Kemptown, winning with 58.3% of the vote and a majority of 9,868.

At the 2019 general election, Russell-Moyle was re-elected as MP for Brighton Kemptown with a decreased vote share of 51.6% and a decreased majority of 8,061. His speech on the night, which included an undertaking to "fight [the Tories] in ... the Parliament ... the courts ... the workplaces ... the streets", aroused comment in the press and on social media.

On 29 May 2024, he was suspended from the Labour Party in relation to a complaint about his behaviour eight years prior, before he was an MP. Because there was insufficient time for the investigation of the complaint to be resolved before the candidacy deadline for the 2024 general election, he became ineligible to stand as the Labour Party candidate for Brighton Kemptown. He described the complaint as "vexatious and politically motivated" and expressed a belief that he would be fully exonerated. In January 2025 it was announced, the investigation had concluded the month before and found "insufficient evidence to proceed", with the complainant then withdrawing the allegation and his full membership restored.

On 20 November 2025, Russell-Moyle joined the Green Party of England and Wales. He cited his disillusion with the Labour Party's direction and its leadership, stating that they "left behind millions" who wanted "hope... [and] change in their lives."

=== European Union, Brexit and parliamentary protest ===
Russell-Moyle was a critic of Brexit and supported a further public vote on the United Kingdom's membership of the European Union. In 2019 he was one of the parliamentarians involved in the Cherry/Miller litigation before the Supreme Court of the United Kingdom, which ruled that Boris Johnson's prorogation of Parliament was unlawful.

On 10 December 2018, he was suspended from the House of Commons for the rest of the day's sitting after taking the ceremonial mace in protest at Theresa May's decision to defer the vote on her Brexit withdrawal agreement.

On 5 March 2019, Russell-Moyle joined thirteen other Labour MPs on Westminster Bridge, next to the Houses of Parliament, in a protest against Brexit under the banner 'Love Socialism Hate Brexit'. Russell-Moyle was one of a number of MPs to light red flares on the bridge. The use of flares so close to Westminster drew the attention of uniformed police, who arrived by boat to inquire what was taking place.

Russell-Moyle was involved in a physical altercation on 21 March 2019 whilst out showing support for demonstrators leafleting for 'The People's March', a demonstration in support of the People's Vote campaign. Russell-Moyle described how an individual first began arguing with an ITV News crew suggesting that they were part of a "mainstream media conspiracy to stop Brexit". Russell-Moyle then approached the scene and said that he was an MP and that "the majority of [his] constituents had voted Remain". He said that this information exacerbated the situation further with the individual describing MPs as "traitors" and lunging at him. The incident took place less than 24 hours after Prime Minister Theresa May gave a speech on Brexit in which she blamed MPs for deliberately delaying her attempt to ensure the UK left the EU by 29 March.

During the attempted prorogation of Parliament in September 2019, Russell-Moyle joined MPs protesting in the Commons chamber and appeared to try to prevent Speaker John Bercow leaving for the prorogation ceremony by lying across him.

=== HIV and public health ===
HIV and public health were among Russell-Moyle's principal policy interests throughout his parliamentary career. In November 2018, during a House of Commons debate marking the 30th World AIDS Day, Russell-Moyle became the first Member of Parliament to disclose in a speech in the House of Commons that he was living with HIV. During his speech he said he had been diagnosed 10 years earlier and had decided to speak publicly to reduce the stigma surrounding HIV and to highlight that, although the United Kingdom was close to ending new HIV transmissions, progress had begun to slow.

Following his disclosure, Russell-Moyle became one of Parliament's leading advocates on HIV policy. As an officer and treasurer of the All-Party Parliamentary Group on HIV and AIDS, he campaigned for wider access to pre-exposure prophylaxis (PrEP), reductions in HIV stigma, increased HIV testing and improved public health responses. He was a prominent supporter of opt out HIV testing in NHS emergency departments, a policy later adopted across a number of high prevalence hospitals, including the Royal Sussex County Hospital in Brighton.

Russell-Moyle continued to campaign throughout his time in Parliament for the Government's target of ending new HIV transmissions in England by 2030, arguing that sustained investment in testing, treatment and prevention was required to achieve the goal.

Following his announcement in Parliament, Russell-Moyle was appointed Honorary Patron of the British HIV Association, a position he has continues to hold.

=== Youth work ===
Drawing on his professional background in youth work before entering Parliament, Russell-Moyle maintained a longstanding interest in youth policy throughout his parliamentary career. Before his election he worked for the National Youth Agency and held leadership roles within the European youth sector, serving as Vice President of the European Youth Forum. In that role he represented European youth organisations internationally and co-chaired the International Youth Task Force for the World Conference on Youth 2014, which developed the Colombo Declaration as a youth contribution to the United Nations post-2015 development agenda. He was also a member of the National Executive Committee of the Socialist Educational Association, the education affiliate of the Labour Party.

Russell-Moyle used a range of parliamentary mechanisms to promote youth work, including serving as Chair of the All-Party Parliamentary Group on Youth Affairs, introducing a Ten Minute Rule Bill seeking to establish a statutory youth service, tabling Early Day Motion 58723 on the importance of youth work, leading parliamentary debates and producing a series of cross party policy reviews.

In May 2018, as Chair of the APPG on Youth Affairs, Russell-Moyle launched a parliamentary inquiry into the role and sufficiency of youth work in England. The inquiry, jointly chaired with Conservative MP Gillian Keegan, examined the impact of reductions in youth work funding and concluded that declining provision had adversely affected young people and communities. It recommended increased long term investment, a national youth strategy, improved workforce planning, capital investment in youth facilities and stronger cross government coordination.

The inquiry received cross party support and was debated in the House of Commons in July 2019. Following the inquiry, the Government announced the £500 million Youth Investment Fund, providing capital funding for new and refurbished youth facilities across England.

Russell-Moyle subsequently chaired two further APPG inquiries into youth work policy and practice. In March 2024 he launched the third and final report in the series of parliamentary reviews into youth work. The first inquiry had been produced with the National Youth Agency, while the final report was developed with Conservative MP Ben Bradley and the Centre for Young Lives. The report recommended a National Youth Work Strategy, a national workforce strategy, renewed investment in professional youth work qualifications and clearer ministerial leadership for youth work. Following the report, the Government announced work on a National Youth Strategy and measures to expand the youth work workforce, including the relaunch of apprenticeship routes into youth work.

Russell-Moyle regularly addressed parliamentary receptions and events organised by the National Youth Agency promoting youth work and youth workers, including the agency's Celebration of Youth Work reception in Parliament in 2022.

=== LGBT rights, transgender rights and conversion therapy ===
Russell-Moyle was a vocal advocate of LGBT rights throughout his parliamentary career and became particularly associated with campaigning on transgender rights. He frequently spoke against what he described as attempts to roll back LGBT protections and legal recognition for transgender people, a position he continued to defend after leaving Parliament.

During Prime Minister's Questions on 20 March 2019, Russell-Moyle urged Prime Minister Theresa May to condemn comments by Andrea Leadsom suggesting that parents should decide when children were "exposed" to LGBT education. Russell-Moyle described the comments as "Conservative Party dog whistle politics" and criticised May for having supported Section 28, arguing that it had caused "millions of young people like myself" to grow up in fear of being LGBT.

Russell-Moyle was also a prominent parliamentary advocate of transgender rights. In June 2020, he wrote an article in Tribune arguing that Labour should defend transgender rights and warning against what he described as a "new Section 28". The article criticised those using personal experiences of sexual violence to oppose transgender rights, including comments made by J. K. Rowling. Following criticism, Russell-Moyle apologised for suggesting that Rowling had discussed her experiences of abuse in anything other than good faith and asked for the passage to be removed from the article. In a later interview after leaving Parliament, Russell-Moyle said he believed the controversy reflected wider disagreements over transgender rights within Labour and maintained that public figures could legitimately be criticised for their views on transgender issues while accepting that his comments about Rowling's personal experiences had been badly phrased.

During a Commons debate on the Gender Recognition Reform (Scotland) Bill in January 2023, Russell-Moyle followed a speech by Miriam Cates, objecting to her use of examples of violence by cisgender men against women in support of restrictions on transgender rights. He was accused of intimidating her by sitting on the cross-benches. He later apologised to Deputy Speaker Rosie Winterton and to Cates for the tone of his intervention but defended the content. Winterton stated in the House of Commons that any MP was entitled to sit in the seat occupied by Russell-Moyle during the debate.

In December 2023, Russell-Moyle introduced a Private Member's Bill to prohibit conversion therapy after the Government abandoned plans to legislate in the area. The Bill was drafted following consultation with campaigners, faith groups and clinicians and sought to prohibit coercive conversion practices while protecting parents, regulated medical practitioners and freedom of expression. The Bill was blocked at its committee stage in March 2024 and did not proceed further.

=== Environment, air and water quality ===
Following the election of Keir Starmer as Leader of the Labour Party in 2020, Russell-Moyle was appointed Shadow Minister for Natural Environment and Air Quality, with responsibility for natural resources, air quality, waste and recycling.

Throughout his parliamentary career, Russell-Moyle spoke on environmental issues including air quality, public access to nature, plastic pollution and water quality. He wrote regularly on air quality and pollution for Tribune and, as Shadow Minister, led Labour's response to regulations banning the supply of single use plastic straws, stirrers and cotton buds in England.

From 2023 until the dissolution of Parliament in 2024, Russell-Moyle served on the Energy Security and Net Zero Select Committee, which scrutinised the work of the Department for Energy Security and Net Zero and its public bodies, including Ofgem, and examined policies relating to energy security and the UK's transition to net zero. During his membership the committee conducted inquiries into domestic energy bills, home heating and the future electricity grid, and visited energy infrastructure across the United Kingdom, including electricity network operators and low carbon energy projects.

Russell-Moyle also campaigned against sewage pollution by water companies, particularly Southern Water. He supported the Good Law Project's legal challenge over sewage discharges, criticised the environmental performance of water companies and argued for the water industry to be returned to public ownership.

=== International: Kurds, Palestine and Latin America ===
Russell-Moyle's international work focused on human rights, conflict resolution and international solidarity, particularly in the Middle East and Latin America. He served as Chair of the All-Party Parliamentary Group on Kurdistan in Turkey and Syria, having previously chaired the APPGs on Kurds in Iran and Rojava, and served as Vice Chair of the APPG on Kurds in Turkey.

Russell-Moyle was one of the few British MPs to visit Kurdish-controlled areas of northern Syria during the Syrian civil war, where he advocated continued UK support for the Autonomous Administration of North and East Syria and argued that the Kurdish-led administration represented an important democratic experiment in the region. Following the 2019 Turkish offensive into northern Syria, he called on the UK Government to oppose the intervention and support Kurdish self-government.

Working with former Foreign Affairs Committee Chair Crispin Blunt, Russell-Moyle co-authored a report examining the treatment of Kurdish political movements in Turkey. The report concluded that Turkish authorities had used the proscription of the Kurdistan Workers' Party (PKK) to restrict lawful Kurdish political activity and solidarity organisations, and recommended that the UK Government review the scope of the organisation's proscription.

Russell-Moyle was an outspoken supporter of Palestinian rights and a critic of Israeli government policy, including Israeli settlement expansion, the occupation of the Palestinian territories and UK arms exports to Israel. He supported recognition of the State of Palestine and the right of return for Palestinian refugees. In 2016, before entering Parliament, he was among the signatories to an open letter calling on the Labour Party to take stronger action against antisemitism and racism within the party.

Before becoming an MP, Russell-Moyle made a number of social media posts critical of Zionism, including one stating that some regarded Zionism as "not by its nature progressive". Following his appointment to Labour's front bench in 2020, the posts attracted criticism from the Jewish Labour Movement, Jewish News, The Jewish Chronicle and other commentators. Russell-Moyle acknowledged some of the language used could cause offence, while maintaining that criticism of Zionism and the policies of the Israeli government should not be conflated with antisemitism.

During parliamentary consideration of legislation restricting public body boycotts of Israel, Russell-Moyle argued against the proposals, citing support for boycotts from prominent former members of the Israeli Labour Party. He subsequently corrected the parliamentary record, clarifying that he had intended to refer to former Israeli Labour politicians, including a former Speaker of the Knesset, rather than the party's current leadership.

Under Labour leader Jeremy Corbyn, Russell-Moyle was Shadow Foreign Minister with responsibility for Latin America and the Caribbean, East Asia and the Pacific, and the Overseas Territories. He also campaigned on human rights in Colombia, supporting parliamentary motions and working with Justice for Colombia to promote implementation of the Colombian peace agreement and protection for trade unionists and human rights defenders.

=== Arms export controls ===
Russell-Moyle was a prominent critic of UK arms export policy, particularly the sale of military equipment to Saudi Arabia for use in the Yemeni civil war. He argued for stronger parliamentary scrutiny of export licences, greater transparency in the licensing process and tighter controls where there was a risk of breaches of international humanitarian law.

As a member of the Committees on Arms Export Controls, Russell-Moyle scrutinised the Government's strategic export licensing regime and questioned ministers over evidence that 30 million rounds of Bosnian ammunition had been diverted to Saudi Arabia despite prior warnings from European and US authorities. The committee's investigation followed reporting by the Balkan Investigative Reporting Network, which revealed the diversion of the ammunition through the UK licensing system.

In connection with his work on Yemen, Russell-Moyle was criticised by the Board of Deputies of British Jews after agreeing to host a Stop the War Coalition meeting in Parliament at which a representative of the Houthi movement had been invited. The Board objected because of previous antisemitic statements associated with the representative. Russell-Moyle said he supported dialogue with parties involved in the UN peace process but made his offer to host the meeting conditional on Ahmed Alshami, the representative concerned, not attending.

Russell-Moyle also campaigned to strengthen UK arms brokering controls, calling for an end to the use of "brass plate" companies with little or no physical presence in the United Kingdom obtaining UK export licences for overseas arms brokering activities.

Following public criticism that the Committees on Arms Export Controls had not undertaken a further inquiry into Saudi arms exports, Russell-Moyle convened a Citizens' Committee on Arms Sales, bringing together MPs, academics, former military officers and civil society organisations to examine UK arms exports to Saudi Arabia and the conflict in Yemen.

=== Select committee work ===
Russell-Moyle served on a number of House of Commons select committees during his parliamentary career. He was a member of the International Development Committee, scrutinising UK overseas aid, humanitarian assistance and international development policy.

He subsequently served on the Public Administration and Constitutional Affairs Committee, examining constitutional reform, standards in public life and the operation of government.

Russell-Moyle was also a member of the International Trade Committee, which scrutinised the United Kingdom's post-Brexit trade agreements and trade policy.

From 2023 until the dissolution of Parliament in 2024, he served on the Energy Security and Net Zero Committee, which examined energy security, electricity networks and the United Kingdom's transition to net zero emissions.

Russell-Moyle also served on the Committees on Arms Export Controls, a joint committee drawn from the International Development, Defence, Foreign Affairs and International Trade Committees, scrutinising the Government's strategic export controls and arms export licensing.

== Personal life ==
Russell-Moyle is gay. He has spoken publicly about living with HIV and was the first MP to disclose his HIV status in the House of Commons.

Russell-Moyle describes himself as a humanist and secularist. He is an honorary associate of the National Secular Society and served as a Vice Chair of the All-Party Parliamentary Humanist Group.

Parliament of the United Kingdom
Preceded by Simon Kirby	Member of Parliament for Brighton Kemptown; 2017–2024	Succeeded by Chris Ward
