= Brighton Kemptown and Peacehaven =

Parliamentary constituency in the United Kingdom, 1950 onwards

Coordinates: 50.824°N 0.035°W

- Borough constituency for the House of Commons
- Boundaries since 2024
- Boundary of Brighton Kemptown and Peacehaven in South East England
- County: East Sussex
- Population: 91,567 (2011 census)
- Electorate: 69,865 (2023)
- Major settlements: Falmer, Moulsecoomb, Rottingdean, Kemp Town, Peacehaven, Telscombe, Saltdean, Brighton Marina, Woodingdean, Queen's Park, Brighton, Bevendean and Whitehawk

Current constituency
- Created: 1950 (as Brighton Kemptown)
- Member of Parliament: Chris Ward (Labour)
- Created from: Brighton

Brighton Kemptown and Peacehaven is a constituency (Note: A borough constituency (for the purposes of election expenses and type of returning officer)) represented in the House of Commons of the UK Parliament since the 2024 general election by Chris Ward of the Labour Party.

Before the 2024 general election the constituency was called Brighton Kemptown, though local political parties referred to it by its current name.

== Constituency profile ==
The Brighton Kemptown and Peacehaven constituency is located in East Sussex on England's south coast. It contains the eastern suburbs of the city of Brighton (Kemptown, Whitehawk and Bevendean), the small town of Peacehaven, and the villages that lie between them (Woodingdean, Ovingdean, Rottingdean and Saltdean). Kemptown is the centre of Brighton's LGBT community and has the highest proportion of LGBT residents of any location in the country at 20%. Whitehawk and Bevendean have a large amount of social housing and high levels of deprivation, whilst the villages between Brighton and Peacehaven are generally affluent. Parts of the University of Brighton lie within the constituency.

Residents' income, education and professional employment levels are similar to national averages, although deprivation is higher. The constituency's ethnic makeup is similar to the country as a whole, with White people forming 87% of the population. At the local council level, almost all seats within the constituency are represented by Labour Party councillors, although the area around Saltdean elected independents. Voters in the constituency marginally supported remaining in the European Union in the 2016 referendum, with an estimated 52% voting against Brexit compared to 48% nationally.

== Boundaries ==
=== Historic (Brighton Kemptown) ===
Map of boundaries 2010–2024

1950–1955: The County Borough of Brighton wards of Elm Grove, Hanover, King's Cliff, Lewes Road, Moulsecoomb, Pier, Queen's Park, Rottingdean, and St John's.

1955–1983: The County Borough of Brighton wards of Elm Grove, Falmer, Hanover, King's Cliff, Lewes Road, Moulsecoomb, Pier, Queen's Park, Rottingdean, and Warren.

1983–1997: The Borough of Brighton wards of Hanover, King's Cliff, Marine, Moulsecoomb, Queen's Park, Rottingdean, Tenantry, and Woodingdean.

1997–2010: The Borough of Brighton wards of King's Cliff, Marine, Moulsecoomb, Queen's Park, Rottingdean, Tenantry, and Woodingdean, and the District of Lewes wards of East Saltdean, Peacehaven East, Peacehaven North, Peacehaven West, and Telscombe Cliffs.

2010–2024: The City of Brighton and Hove wards of East Brighton, Moulsecoomb and Bevendean, Queen's Park, Rottingdean Coastal, and Woodingdean, and the District of Lewes wards of East Saltdean and Telscombe Cliffs, Peacehaven East, Peacehaven North, and Peacehaven West.

=== Current (Brighton Kemptown and Peacehaven) ===
Further to the 2023 review of Westminster constituencies which came into effect for the 2024 general election, the composition of the renamed constituency (based on the ward structure in place at 1 December 2020) was expanded slightly in order to bring the electorate within the permitted range by transferring from Brighton Pavilion part of the Hanover and Elm Grove ward – namely polling district PHEA, and that part of polling district PHEF to the east of Queen's Park Road.

Following a local government boundary review in Brighton and Hove which came into effect in May 2023, the constituency now comprises the following from the 2024 general election:

- The City of Brighton and Hove wards of: Coldean & Stanmer (part); Hanover & Elm Grove (small part – see above); Kemptown; Moulsecoomb & Bevendean (most); Queen's Park; Rottingdean & West Saltdean; Whitehawk & Marina; Woodingdean.
- The District of Lewes wards of: East Saltdean & Telscombe Cliffs; Peacehaven East; Peacehaven North; Peacehaven West.

== History ==
History of boundaries

This constituency was created in 1950 when the two-member constituency of Brighton was split into three single-member seats.

Boundary changes for the 1997 general election moved Peacehaven, a semi-rural area, into the constituency. This added a ward where the Conservatives had been favoured, but Labour gained the seat at its landslide victory. Des Turner held it until 2010, when Simon Kirby of the Conservative Party won it.

History of results

For a total of 48 years since the seat's creation, it has been Conservative-controlled (1950–1964; 1970–1997; 2010–2017). The only other party to hold the seat since its creation has been the Labour Party.

Labour first won Kemptown in 1964, with a narrow majority of just seven votes. (Note: The majority of seven made Brighton Kemptown the most marginal seat in the country in 1964) Dennis Hobden, the first Labour MP to ever be elected in Sussex, increased his majority in 1966, but lost the seat in 1970, and another Labour MP was not returned until 1997. The seat was a national bellwether constituency from 1979 to 2015, but in 2017 elected a Labour MP when the country as a whole returned a hung parliament with the Conservatives being the largest party by a margin of 56 MPs.

Liberal Democrats and their two predecessor parties following national trends formed the third-largest party in the constituency, 1950–2010 inclusive. The 2010 general election result for the party can be seen as 0.6% behind "its" highest, at 18.6%, if including its SDP forerunner. The Liberal Democrat vote share collapsed to 3% in 2015 (behind UKIP and Green Party candidates) and remained at the 3% level in 2017 despite the absence of UKIP and Green candidates for the seat at that election.

The Green Party candidate finished in fourth place at the 2005, 2010 and 2015 elections, retaining their deposit each time, with vote shares ranging from 5.5% to 7.0%. The Greens did not field a candidate in 2017 and endorsed Labour, who subsequently gained the seat with a majority of just under 10,000 votes.

The 2015 general election result had made the seat the tenth-most marginal majority of the Conservative Party's 331 seats by percentage of majority.

On 29 May 2024, Russell-Moyle announced that he had received a letter that he had been suspended from membership of the Labour Party, because of what he believed was a vexatious complaint, which made him ineligible to be their candidate at the 2024 general election. Chris Ward was selected in his place and was subsequently elected as the Labour MP.

== Members of Parliament ==
Brighton prior to 1950

Election	Member	Party
1950	Howard Johnson	Conservative
1959	David James	Conservative
1964	Dennis Hobden	Labour
1970	Andrew Bowden	Conservative
1997	Des Turner	Labour
2010	Simon Kirby	Conservative
2017	Lloyd Russell-Moyle †	Labour Co-op
2024	Chris Ward	Labour

†: Lloyd Russell-Moyle was suspended from the Labour Party after Parliament had prorogued on 24 May 2024 and a day before the dissolution of Parliament on 30 May 2024.

== Elections ==
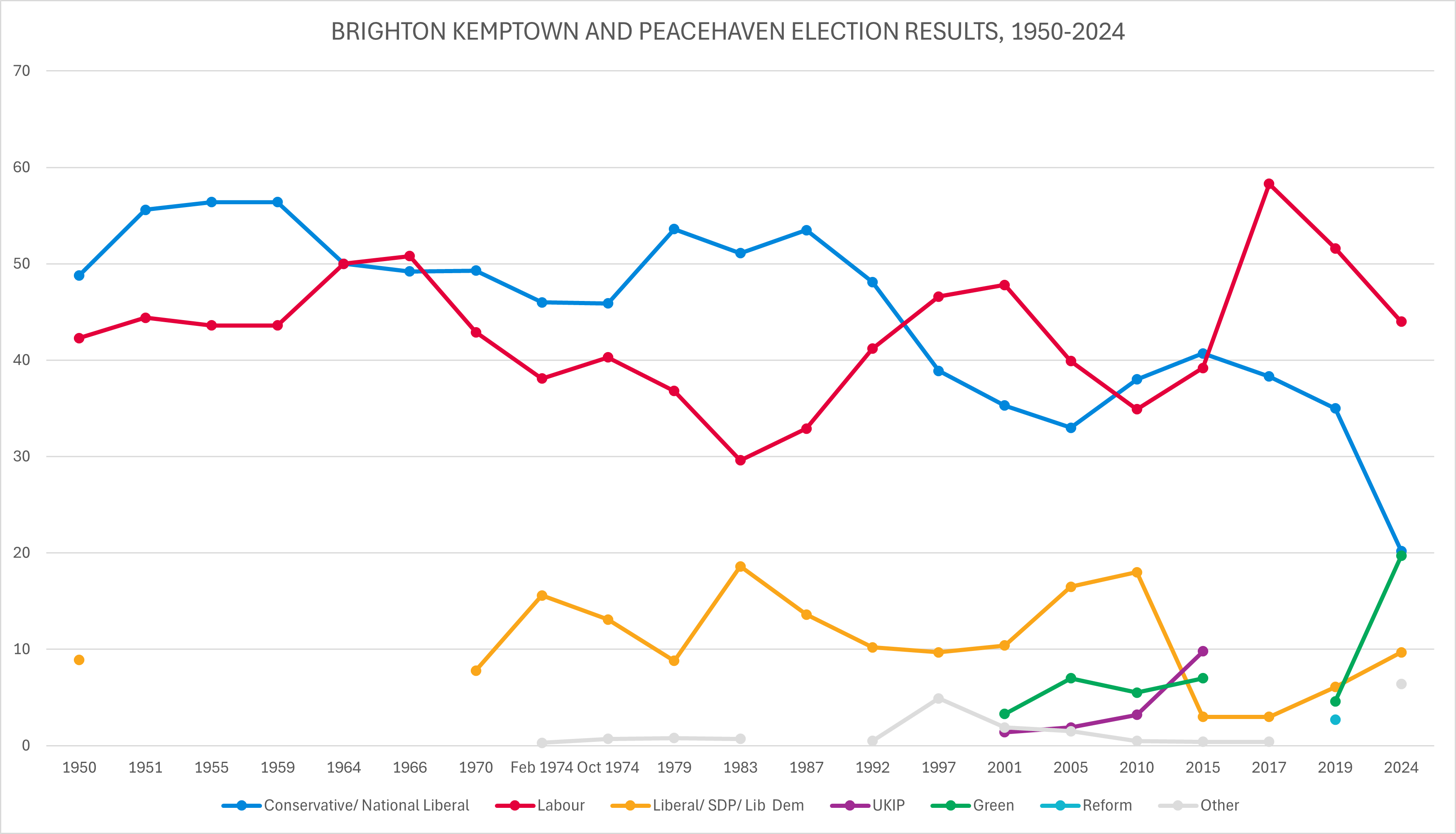
Brighton Kemptown and Peacehaven election results, 1950-2024

=== Elections in the 2020s ===
General election 2024: Brighton Kemptown and Peacehaven
Party	Candidate	Votes	%	±%
Labour	Chris Ward	17,893	44.0	−7.2
Conservative	Khobi Vallis	8,230	20.2	−14.2
Green	Elaine Hills	7,997	19.7	+14.0
Liberal Democrats	Stewart Stone	3,949	9.7	+3.7
Independent	Emma Wall	1,833	4.5	N/A
SDP	Valerie Gray	784	1.9	N/A
Majority		9,609	23.8	▲7.0
Turnout		40,686	59.2	▼11.6
Registered electors		68,784		
Labour hold		Swing	▲3.5	

=== Elections in the 2010s ===
2019 notional result
Party	Vote	%
Labour	25,299	51.2
Conservative	17,019	34.4
Liberal Democrats	2,964	6.0
Green	2,813	5.7
Brexit Party	1,335	2.7
Turnout	49,430	70.8
Electorate	69,865	

General election 2019: Brighton Kemptown
Party	Candidate	Votes	%	±%
Labour Co-op	Lloyd Russell-Moyle	25,033	51.6	−6.7
Conservative	Joe Miller	16,972	35.0	−3.3
Liberal Democrats	Ben Thomas	2,964	6.1	+3.1
Green	Alex Phillips	2,237	4.6	N/A
Brexit Party	Graham Cushway	1,327	2.7	N/A
Majority		8,061	16.6	−3.4
Turnout		48,533	69.5	−3.0
Labour Co-op hold		Swing	-1.6	

General election 2017: Brighton Kemptown
Party	Candidate	Votes	%	±%
Labour Co-op	Lloyd Russell-Moyle	28,703	58.3	+19.1
Conservative	Simon Kirby	18,835	38.3	−2.4
Liberal Democrats	Emily Tester	1,457	3.0	±0.0
Independent	Doktor Haze	212	0.4	N/A
Majority		9,868	20.0	N/A
Turnout		49,207	72.5	+5.7
Labour Co-op gain from Conservative		Swing	+10.8	

General election 2015: Brighton Kemptown
Party	Candidate	Votes	%	±%
Conservative	Simon Kirby	18,428	40.7	+2.7
Labour	Nancy Platts	17,738	39.2	+4.3
UKIP	Ian Buchanan	4,446	9.8	+6.6
Green	Davy Jones	3,187	7.0	+1.5
Liberal Democrats	Paul Chandler	1,365	3.0	−15.0
Socialist (GB)	Jacqueline Shodeke	73	0.2	N/A
Independent	Matthew Taylor	69	0.2	N/A
Majority		690	1.5	−1.6
Turnout		45,306	66.8	+2.1
Conservative hold		Swing	-0.8	

General election 2010: Brighton Kemptown
Party	Candidate	Votes	%	±%
Conservative	Simon Kirby	16,217	38.0	+5.0
Labour Co-op	Simon Burgess	14,889	34.9	−5.0
Liberal Democrats	Juliet Williams	7,691	18.0	+1.5
Green	Ben Duncan	2,330	5.5	−1.5
UKIP	James Chamberlain-Webber	1,384	3.2	+1.3
TUSC	Dave Hill	194	0.5	N/A
Majority		1,328	3.1	N/A
Turnout		42,705	64.7	+4.5
Conservative gain from Labour		Swing	+5.0	

=== Elections in the 2000s ===
General election 2005: Brighton Kemptown
Party	Candidate	Votes	%	±%
Labour	Des Turner	15,858	39.9	−7.9
Conservative	Judith Symes	13,121	33.0	−2.3
Liberal Democrats	Marina Pepper	6,560	16.5	+6.1
Green	Simon Williams	2,800	7.0	+3.7
UKIP	James Chamberlain-Webber	758	1.9	+0.5
Peace	Caroline O'Reilly	172	0.4	N/A
Socialist Labour	John McLeod	163	0.4	−0.5
Independent	Elaine Cooke	127	0.3	N/A
Socialist	Phil Clarke	113	0.3	N/A
Independent	Gene Dobbs	47	0.1	N/A
Majority		2,737	6.9	−5.6
Turnout		39,719	60.2	+2.6
Labour hold		Swing	−2.8	

General election 2001: Brighton Kemptown
Party	Candidate	Votes	%	±%
Labour	Des Turner	18,745	47.8	+1.2
Conservative	Geoffrey Theobald	13,823	35.3	−3.6
Liberal Democrats	Janet Marshall	4,064	10.4	+0.7
Green	Barney Miller	1,290	3.3	N/A
UKIP	James Chamberlain-Webber	543	1.4	N/A
Socialist Labour	John McLeod	364	0.9	+0.2
Free Party	Dave Dobbs	227	0.6	N/A
ProLife Alliance	Elaine Cooke	147	0.4	N/A
Majority		4,922	12.5	+4.8
Turnout		39,203	57.6	−13.0
Labour hold		Swing		

=== Elections in the 1990s ===
General election 1997: Brighton Kemptown
Party	Candidate	Votes	%	±%
Labour	Des Turner	21,479	46.6	+14.0
Conservative	Andrew Bowden	17,945	38.9	−13.9
Liberal Democrats	Clive Gray	4,478	9.7	−4.2
Referendum	David Inman	1,526	3.3	N/A
Socialist Labour	Hannah Williams	316	0.7	N/A
Natural Law	Jeremy Bowler	172	0.4	−0.1
Monster Raving Loony	Lorrie Newman	123	0.3	N/A
Rainbow Dream Ticket	Richard Darlow	93	0.2	N/A
Majority		3,534	7.7	N/A
Turnout		46,132	70.6	−5.5
Labour gain from Conservative		Swing	+14.0	

1992 Notional Result
Party	Vote	%
Conservative	26,828	52.8
Labour	16,571	32.6
Liberal Democrats	7,056	13.9
Others	371	0.7
Turnout	50,826	77.1
Electorate	65,932	

General election 1992: Brighton Kemptown
Party	Candidate	Votes	%	±%
Conservative	Andrew Bowden	21,129	48.1	−5.4
Labour	Gill O. Haynes	18,073	41.2	+8.3
Liberal Democrats	Paul D. Scott	4,461	10.2	−3.4
Natural Law	Elizabeth J. Overall	230	0.5	N/A
Majority		3,056	6.9	−13.7
Turnout		43,893	76.1	+1.6
Conservative hold		Swing	−6.8	

=== Elections in the 1980s ===
General election 1987: Brighton Kemptown
Party	Candidate	Votes	%	±%
Conservative	Andrew Bowden	24,031	53.5	+2.4
Labour	Steve Bassam	14,771	32.9	+3.3
Liberal	Chris Berry	6,080	13.6	−5.0
Majority		9,260	20.6	−0.5
Turnout		44,882	74.5	+3.0
Conservative hold		Swing		

General election 1983: Brighton Kemptown
Party	Candidate	Votes	%	±%
Conservative	Andrew Bowden	22,265	51.1	
Labour	Roderick Fitch	12,887	29.6	
SDP	David Burke	8,098	18.6	N/A
National Front	Ted Budden	290	0.7	
Majority		9,378	21.5	
Turnout		43,540	71.5	
Conservative hold		Swing		

=== Elections in the 1970s ===
General election 1979: Brighton Kemptown
Party	Candidate	Votes	%	±%
Conservative	Andrew Bowden	25,512	53.6	+7.7
Labour	Quintin Barry	17,504	36.8	−3.5
Liberal	S. Osbourne	8,098	8.8	−4.3
National Front	Valerie Tyndall	404	0.8	N/A
Majority		8,008	16.8	+11.2
Turnout		47,599	74.2	+1.9
Conservative hold		Swing		

General election October 1974: Brighton Kemptown
Party	Candidate	Votes	%	±%
Conservative	Andrew Bowden	21,725	45.9	−0.1
Labour	Dennis Hobden	19,060	40.3	+2.2
Liberal	S. Osbourne	6,214	13.1	−2.5
English National	Harvey Holford	155	0.3	N/A
Marxist-Leninist (England)	J. Buckle	125	0.3	±0.0
Independent	Brian Ralfe	47	0.1	N/A
Majority		2,665	5.6	−2.3
Turnout		47,326	72.3	−6.5
Conservative hold		Swing		

General election February 1974: Brighton Kemptown
Party	Candidate	Votes	%	±%
Conservative	Andrew Bowden	23,504	46.0	−3.3
Labour	Dennis Hobden	19,484	38.1	−4.8
Liberal	D. Hall	7,954	15.6	+7.8
Marxist-Leninist (England)	J. Buckle	170	0.3	N/A
Majority		4,020	7.9	+1.5
Turnout		51,112	78.8	+3.8
Conservative hold		Swing		

General election 1970: Brighton Kemptown
Party	Candidate	Votes	%	±%
Conservative	Andrew Bowden	24,208	49.3	+0.1
Labour	Dennis Hobden	21,105	42.9	−7.9
Liberal	Oliver Moxon	3,833	7.8	N/A
Majority		3,103	6.4	N/A
Turnout		49,146	75.0	−5.1
Conservative gain from Labour		Swing		

=== Elections in the 1960s ===
General election 1966: Brighton Kemptown
Party	Candidate	Votes	%	±%
Labour	Dennis Hobden	24,936	50.8	+0.8
Conservative	Andrew Bowden	24,105	49.2	−0.8
Majority		831	1.6	+1.6
Turnout		49,041	80.1	+7.9
Labour hold		Swing		

General election 1964: Brighton Kemptown
Party	Candidate	Votes	%	±%
Labour	Dennis Hobden	22,308	50.0	+6.4
Conservative	David James	22,301	50.0	−6.4
Majority		7	0.0	N/A
Turnout		44,609	72.2	−1.6
Labour gain from Conservative		Swing		

=== Elections in the 1950s ===
General election 1959: Brighton Kemptown
Party	Candidate	Votes	%	±%
Conservative	David James	25,411	56.4	±0.0
Labour	Lewis Cohen	19,665	43.6	±0.0
Majority		5,746	12.8	±0.0
Turnout		45,076	73.8	+3.8
Conservative hold		Swing		

General election 1955: Brighton Kemptown
Party	Candidate	Votes	%	±%
Conservative	Howard Johnson	23,142	56.4	−1.2
Labour	Lewis Cohen	17,885	43.6	−0.8
Majority		5,257	12.8	+1.6
Turnout		41,027	70.0	−7.1
Conservative hold		Swing		

General election 1951: Brighton Kemptown
Party	Candidate	Votes	%	±%
Conservative	Howard Johnson	25,923	55.6	+6.8
Labour	Lewis Cohen	20,726	44.4	+2.1
Majority		5,197	11.2	+4.7
Turnout		46,649	77.1	−0.9
Conservative hold		Swing		

General election 1950: Brighton Kemptown
Party	Candidate	Votes	%	±%
Conservative	Howard Johnson	22,431	48.8	
Labour	Joseph Huddart	19,430	42.3	
Liberal	Robert Michael Buckley	4,073	8.9	
Majority		3,001	6.5	
Turnout		45,934	78.0	
Conservative win (new seat)				

== See also ==
- parliamentary constituencies in East Sussex
- List of parliamentary constituencies in the South East England (region)

== Sources ==
- Election result, 2005 (BBC)
- Election results, 1997 – 2001 (BBC)
- Election results, 1997 – 2001 (Election Demon)
- Election results, 1983 – 1992 (Election Demon)
- Election results, 1992 – 2005 (Guardian)
- Election results, 1951 – 2001 (Keele University)
