= Andrew Bowden =

British politician (born 1930)

Sir Andrew Bowden MBE
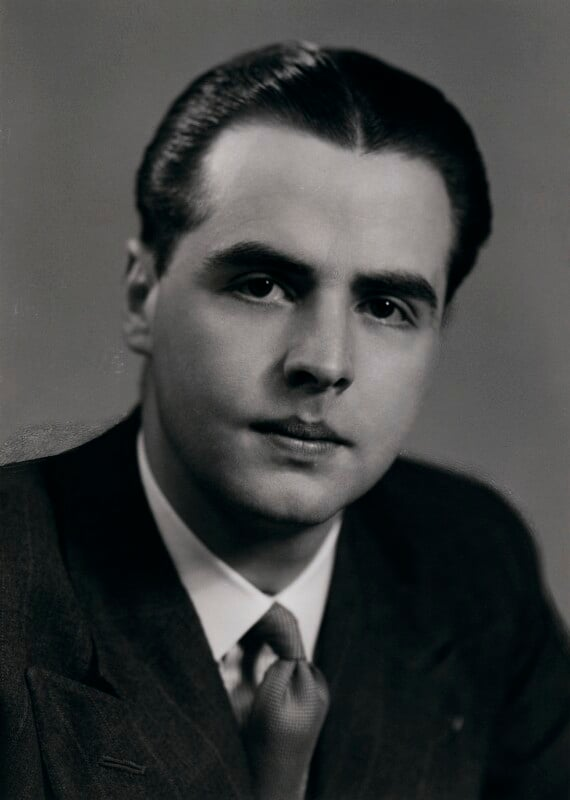
- Bowden in 1954

Council of Europe Member
- In office 1987–1997

Member of Parliament for Brighton Kemptown
- In office 18 June 1970 – 8 April 1997
- Preceded by: Dennis Hobden
- Succeeded by: Des Turner

Personal details
- Born: 8 April 1930 (age 96)
- Party: Conservative
- Spouse: Benita Napier
- Children: 2

Sir Andrew Bowden MBE (born 8 April 1930) is a British Conservative Party politician. From 2004 to 2010, he was an international consultant at Global Equities Corporation.

== Early life ==
Bowden was born the son of William Victor Bowden, a solicitor, and Francesca Wilson. He was educated at Ardingly College.

He started his career as a sales executive. He served as a councillor on Wandsworth Borough Council from 1956 to 1961 and as national chairman of Young Conservatives from 1960 to 1961. Bowden worked in the paint industry from 1955 to 1968.

== Parliamentary career ==
He entered the House of Commons on his fourth attempt in 1970 by gaining the Brighton Kemptown seat from the Labour Party. As well as fighting Kemptown in the previous election, he had fought Hammersmith North in 1955 and Kensington North in 1964. He remained Member of Parliament for Kemptown until his defeat by Labour's Desmond Turner in the 1997 election. As an MP, he acted as a parliamentary consultant for Southern Water. He was a member of the Council of Europe from 1987 to 1997.

He was accused of failing to register an election donation of £5,319 from lobbyist Ian Greer, who acted for Mohammed Al Fayed, as well as business interests with the House of Fraser.

== After Parliament ==
In recent years he has become a regular on the poker circuit. He also plays chess and golf. From 1975 to 1997, he served as national president of the Captive Animals Protection Society. He is a patron of the Sussex & Kent ME/CFS Society. He is president of Brighton's Royal British Legion branch. He has also acted as vice president of the League Against Cruel Sports.

== Honours ==
Bowden received an MBE in 1961. He was knighted in 1994.

== Personal life ==
Bowden married Benita Napier in 1970. He has a son and daughter.

Bowden lives in Ovingdean, Brighton, and is a member of the Carlton Club. His recreations include birdwatching, chess and poker.

== Bibliography ==
- Dare We Trust Them – A New Vision for Europe (2005)

Parliament of the United Kingdom
Preceded by Dennis Hobden	Member of Parliament for Brighton Kemptown; 1970–1997	Succeeded by Des Turner
