= Klaus Grutzka =

German-American artist (1923–2011)

Klaus G. Grutzka
- Born: February 9, 1923; Breslau (Wroclaw), Upper Silesia, Germany
- Died: March 28, 2011 (aged 88); Lancaster, Pennsylvania, US
- Resting place: Laurel Hill Memorial Gardens (Lancaster, Pennsylvania)
- Education: Muthesius Werkschule
- Known for: Paintings of industrial subjects
- Movement: Precisionism
- Spouse(s): Eva Grutzka (divorced); Sybilla Grutzka

Klaus Guido Grutzka (February 9, 1923 – March 28, 2011) was a German-American artist whose paintings and commercial art were influenced by both precisionism and abstract expressionism. Grutzka became noted for his artistic works with industrial motifs.

During World War II Grutzka served as an engineer on a German destroyer (which sank) and a U-boot submarine (which was captured). After the war he studied art at the Muthesius Werkschule in Kiel, Germany. In 1961 he and his second wife emigrated to the United States, where he spent much of his art career.

Grutzka's work includes posters, the label for the Dortmund Union Brewery, covers for the trade magazine 33 Metal Producing, and paintings for corporate clients including Krupp, McGraw-Hill, and General Electric. A substantial collection his paintings and other archival materials is held by the National Iron & Steel Heritage Museum in Coatesville, Pennsylvania.

== Early life and education ==
Klaus Grutzka's father, Johan (Jan) Grutzka (Grudska), was born in Krakau (Kraków), Poland. Johann Grudska and his wife Helene married and had two children, a girl (Marianne Grutzka) and a son, whom they named Klaus Guido Grutzka. Klaus Grutzka began working as a young man in a nearby coal mine and pursued drawing and painting in his spare time. Grutzka's father also had interest in art and drawing, an interest that he passed on to his son. Klaus Grutzka's artistic talents came to the attention of a local nobleman who then sponsored Grutzka.

As a young man, Klaus Grutzka moved from Breslau to Kiel, a Baltic harbor town and one of the major naval ports in Germany. There, in 1941, he joined the Kriegsmarine as an officer's candidate. During his time in the German Navy, he was trained as an engineer. He initially served on a destroyer, which was attacked and sank during a World War II battle, an experience that threatened his life. Grutka's next placement was that of a chief engineer on a German submarine (U-Boot), in charge of its diesel engines. He was specifically assigned to U-1205.

Grutka married his first wife, Eva, née Koenn, in Kiel, around the end of 1942. Near the end of the World War II, Grutka's U-boot was scuttled at Kiel and the crew were captured and became prisoners of war. Klaus Grutzka was imprisoned in a prisoner camp in Scotland, where he was interned when his son Claus was born in 1945. Following his release as a prisoner of war in 1947, Grutzka returned to Kiel, to be with his wife and young son.

Klaus Grutzka subsequently enrolled in the prestigious Muthesius Werkschule in Kiel for formal art study and became known among local artists and art patrons. He illustrated local volumes of books about the region, such as Kiel: Bildroman einer Stadt (Kiel: A visual novel of a city) by Hans Ludwig Zankl, for which Fritz Neuser did the cover and Grutzka provided illustrations. Grutzka participated repeatedly in the annual poster competition for the world-famous sailing event, the Kiel Week regatta. One of his posters was accepted as an ambassador for this prestigious sailing event.

== Career as an artist ==
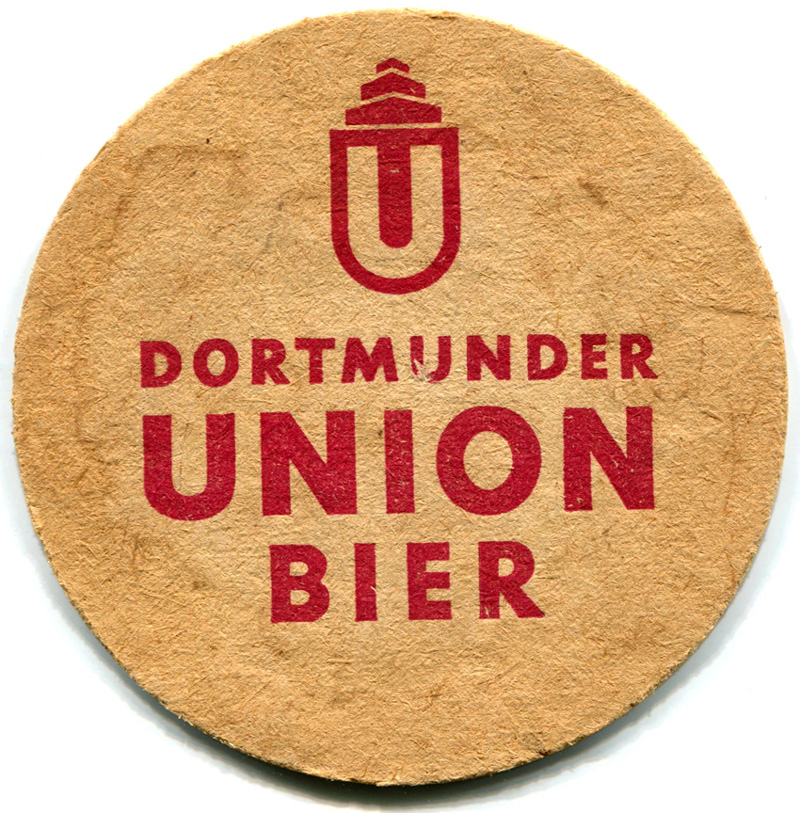
Dortmunder Union Bier coaster, showing the "U" logo designed by Grutzka

Throughout Grutzka's career, he painted industrial motifs as well as artistic works depicting the interiors of Catholic churches, especially frescos. Grutzka's interest in heavy machinery, shipbuilding and diesel engines had continued during his studies in Kiel, an interest that served as a focal point for his artistry. His works are heavily influenced by both precisionism and abstract expressionism. They often focus on essential geometrical forms, with great attention to detail. Grutzka's artistic techniques generally made use of pencil, oil, watercolor, pen, and pastels, with the aid of photographs. k

After divorcing his first wife Eva, he met Sybilla Hamilton, an Irish-born journalist and language instructor. Together they moved to Essen, a city in the center of the “Ruhrgebiet”. This area was the center of Germany's coal mining and steel mill industries. For several years in Essen, he worked for major corporations RWE, Krupp and the Dortmund Union Brewery, completing industrial art projects on their behalf. Among other projects, he designed the world-famous logo for the Union Brewery, the stylized capital "U" logo, which is still widely used on the brewery's packaging.

During this period of his life, Grutzka went on two journeys that influenced much of the rest of his artistic career. One trip was to Moscow in what was then the USSR, and the second one was to North America, especially New York City. Grutzka had been invited by his friend and fellow alumnus from the Muthesius Werkschule, Eberhard Lüthke, who had immigrated to the United States earlier. Lüthke suggested they should join him and his wife in the United States.

The visit to the United States influenced Grutzka and his wife Sybilla to move to the United States in 1961. They initially lived in an apartment in Astoria, near the East River in New York City, a neighborhood where many German immigrants had already settled. The subsequently rented half of the home of another German immigrant, the home being located in Hoboken, New Jersey. During their time in residence in Hoboken, Grutzka became further familiar with the local industrial landscape. Grutzka produced a significant number of paintings and line drawings of the local industrial landscape.

Grutzka also illustrated covers for 33 Metal Producing magazine, a trade publication that served the steel industry. He eventually painted over 100 covers for the magazine, which were widely recognized for their artistic value. The covers he created for “33” are considered to be among his most significant achievements. He also partnered with Richard Deily, a steel industry researcher. Together they published an internationally acclaimed newsletter, entitled “IISS”, Institute for Iron and Steel Studies.

At this period of his career, Grutzka served as an instructor at the DuCret School of Art in Plainfield, New Jersey.

Grutzka subsequently began industrial art projects with major corporations, especially Bethlehem Steel. He traveled nationwide, and produced contract work for several major international oil and steel corporations. Other clients of his included Lukens Steel Company, Babcock & Wilcox, Foster Wheeler, Krupp, McGraw-Hill, and General Electric. His most significant contributions to Bethelem Steel were archival paintings of steel mills. Shortly after their completion, many of the mills that were his subjects were mostly dismantled.

As the steel industry declined in that time period, Grutzka began employment at The Hill School in Pottstown, Pennsylvania, where he served as an assistant professor in the Arts Department. He remained on the faculty at The Hill School for about eight years and eventually served as department chairperson.

“Everyone liked Klaus. He was a real gentleman and extremely knowledgeable.... You could ask him any question and get an encyclopedia for an answer.”

Subsequently, Grutzka and his wife Sybilla moved to Lancaster, Pennsylvania, where he continued to work as an artist for another 20 years. He died on March 28, 2011. His body was interred at Laurel Hill Memorial Gardens in Lancaster, Pennsylvania.

In 2013, a collection of thousands of his artworks was acquired by the National Iron & Steel Heritage Museum in the Lukens Historic District of Coatesville, Pennsylvania, and his Lancaster studio was re-created at the Museum. Grutzka's depiction in his artworks of the surroundings of industrial architecture has added to its popular appeal.

== Honors and legacy ==
Grutzka was a charter member of the Society for Industrial Archeology.

The National Iron & Steel Heritage Museum maintains the Grutzka Studio. The museum has a collection of Grutzka's artworks numbering several thousand, which can be loaned out for exhibitions.

With interests in both art and engineering, Klaus Grutzka collected mechanical steam toys, which were sold at auction after his death.
