= Karin Olah =

American artist (born 1977)

- Born: February 3, 1977 (age 49); Lititz, Pennsylvania, U.S.
- Education: Maryland Institute College of Art, Baltimore
- Known for: Artist
- Notable work: Sea Wall (2018); Garden Quilt (2007)
- Website: karinolah.com

Karin Olah (born 1977) is an American contemporary artist in Charleston, South Carolina. She combines hand-dyed fabric and paint to create her signature multi-layered paintings. Olah is known in the American South for her fabric collages which mimic elements of the natural world. Her imagery is informed by quilt-making as well as the light patterns and colors of coastal landscapes.

== About ==
Olah was born in 1977 and is from Lancaster County, Pennsylvania. She attended the Maryland Institute College of Art (MICA), receiving a B.F.A. in fiber art in 1999. Following art school, Olah worked for several years in Manhattan managing a textile studio with couture fashion designer clients such as Donna Karan, Marc Jacobs, and Ralph Lauren. Olah's work is found in private and corporate collections including the Medical University of South Carolina’s Contemporary Carolina Collection, the City of Charleston's Office of Cultural Affairs; and the Shoestring Publishing Company.
