= Des Turner =

British politician (born 1939)

Member of Parliament for Brighton Kemptown
- In office 2 May 1997 – 12 April 2010
- Preceded by: Andrew Bowden
- Succeeded by: Simon Kirby

Personal details
- Born: 17 July 1939 (age 87) Southampton, Hampshire, UK
- Party: Labour
- Spouse: Lynn Rogers
- Education: Imperial College London, University College, London

Desmond Stanley Turner (born 17 July 1939) is a British Labour Party politician who was the Member of Parliament (MP) for Brighton Kemptown from 1997 to 2010.

== Early life ==
He was born in Southampton and educated at Luton Grammar School (now known as Luton Sixth Form College) on Bradgers Hill Road in Luton. At Imperial College London, he gained a BSc and MSc. At University College, London, he gained a PhD, researching Biochemistry. At Brighton Polytechnic, he got a PGCE, and subsequently became a teacher. He also became a partner in an independent brewery. He has been a lecturer at the University of Surrey and the University of Sussex.

Turner was a Councillor on East Sussex County Council 1985–1997, and on Brighton Borough Council 1994–1996 and its successor Brighton and Hove City Council 1996–97.

== Parliamentary career ==
He contested Mid-Sussex in 1979. Turner finally entered Parliament in 1997.

In 2001, Turner put forward a private member's bill in an attempt to better regulate home heating and energy efficiency in rented houses of multiple occupancy, but he had to withdraw the bill in July 2002 after government opposition to an amendment passed calling for energy savings of 30% by 2010.

During the passage of the Equality Act 2006, Turner led an early day motion which, with Waheed Alli's amendment in the House of Lords, led the government to extend the bill's anti-discrimination protections to LGBTQ+ people by providing the statutory power to issue the Equality Act (Sexual Orientation) Regulations 2007 and the Equality Act (Sexual Orientation) Regulations (Northern Ireland) 2006.

Turner stood down at the 2010 general election, with the local Labour Party selecting Simon Burgess as their candidate to succeed him. Burgess did not win the seat, with Simon Kirby holding the seat until 2017.

== Personal life ==
His second wife is Lynn Rogers, whom he married in September 1997 in Brighton. He has a daughter from his first marriage to Lynette Gwyn-Jones, the former Leader of Brighton and Hove Council.

Parliament of the United Kingdom
Preceded by Sir Andrew Bowden	Member of Parliament for Brighton Kemptown; 1997–2010	Succeeded by Simon Kirby
