= Lewis Cohen, Baron Cohen of Brighton =

British politician

Lewis Coleman Cohen, Baron Cohen of Brighton (28 March 1897 – 21 October 1966) was a British politician. Cohen was elected as a Labour councillor and Mayor to Brighton Borough Council. On the council he specialised in housing and worked together with Howard Johnson (a Conservative councillor) to support a local housing association. Cohen and Johnson also knew each other through business.

Cohen twice stood unsuccessfully for Parliament, as Labour Party candidate for Brighton in the general election of 1931 and in 1935.

Cohen was created a life peer on 13 May 1965 taking the title Baron Cohen of Brighton, of Brighton in the County of Sussex.

He was the founder of the Alliance Building Society and had many building projects which were ahead of their time in Brighton and wider Sussex.

Coat of arms of Lewis Cohen, Baron Cohen of Brighton
Crest Issuant from a Pavilion Or lined and embellished Sable with a Forked Pennant flying therefrom to the dexter Gules a Lion passant supporting with the dexter forepaw a Branch of Coral Gules Escutcheon Per chevron flory at the top Gules and Or in chief two Bees volant and in base a Lion rampant counterchanged Supporters On either side a Dolphin Sable finned Or the dexter charged on the shoulder with a Tower the sinister likewise charged with a Martlet Or
