= Lewis Cohen (cardmaker) =

American cardmaker (1800–1868)

Lewis I. Cohen (1800 – 1868) was an American cardmaker who was a major manufacturer in the playing card business.

Lewis was born in 1800, in Lancaster, Pennsylvania, but moved to London, England in 1814. Here he was apprenticed to his half-brother Solomon Cohen who had a business manufacturing pencils. In 1819, he returned to the USA on the barque Mary and Susan.

As he arrived in New York he noticed a schooner from Florida loaded with cedar logs. Noticing that this timber did not have any knots, he promptly bought the entire shipment for £30, paying a fraction per log of what his brother, Solomon, was paying per foot in London. He persuaded Captain Champlin of the Mary and Susan to transport the load back to London as ballast, meaning without cost.

Lewis I. Cohen then went on to make a name for himself as the first American to make lead pencils and for introducing steel pens to the US, in place of old-type quill pens. However, Cohen's greatest achievement was in developing playing card manufacture through mechanized colour printing. Alongside George Baxter (1836) and Thomas de la Rue (1831) he pioneered printing four colours in one pass, registering his colour-printing machine in 1835.

He formed his business, L. I. Cohen, New York, publishing his first deck of playing cards in 1832. He used an Eagle perched atop the spade symbol, enshrined by thirteen shining stars, as insignia on the Ace of Spades of each deck. In 1845, he retired, issuing a gold embossed deck of playing cards. His son, Solomon L. Cohen, and his nephew, John M. Lawrence took over the firm and in 1850 the stationery side of the business was sold. On December 5, 1871, Lawrence and Cohen turned the business into a stock company together with three new partners: Samuel Hart, Isaac Levy and John J. Levy. Together, they would form the New York Consolidated Card Company.
