= Parliamentary constituencies in Dorset =

The location of Dorset relative to England.

The ceremonial county of Dorset (which comprises the two unitary authorities of Dorset and Bournemouth, Christchurch and Poole) is divided into 8 parliamentary constituencies: 3 borough constituencies and 5 county constituencies.

== Constituencies ==
† Conservative ‡ Labour ¤ Liberal Democrat

| Constituency (Note: BC denotes borough constituency, CC denotes county constituency.) | Electorate | Majority | Member of Parliament | Nearest opposition | Map |
|---|---|---|---|---|---|
| Bournemouth East BC | 73,173 | 5,479 | Tom Hayes‡ | Tobias Ellwood† | Map showing the location of the Bournemouth East constituency in Dorset under the boundaries created by the 2023 boundary review and first used at the 2024 general election. |
| Bournemouth West BC | 72,094 | 3,224 | Jessica Toale‡ | Conor Burns† | Map showing the location of the Bournemouth West constituency in Dorset under the boundaries created by the 2023 boundary review and first used at the 2024 general election. |
| Christchurch CC | 71,598 | 7,455 | Christopher Chope† | Mike Cox¤ | Map showing the location of the Christchurch constituency in Dorset under the boundaries created by the 2023 boundary review and first used at the 2024 general election. |
| Mid Dorset and North Poole CC | 74,305 | 1,352 | Vikki Slade¤ | Michael Tomlinson† | Map showing the location of the Mid Dorset and North Poole constituency in Dorset under the boundaries created by the 2023 boundary review and first used at the 2024 general election. |
| North Dorset CC | 72,109 | 1,589 | Simon Hoare† | Gary Jackson¤ | Map showing the location of the North Dorset constituency in Dorset under the boundaries created by the 2023 boundary review and first used at the 2024 general election. |
| Poole BC | 72,162 | 18 | Neil Duncan-Jordan‡ | Robert Syms† | Map showing the location of the Poole constituency in Dorset under the boundaries created by the 2023 boundary review and first used at the 2024 general election. |
| South Dorset CC | 76,640 | 1,048 | Lloyd Hatton‡ | Richard Drax† | Map showing the location of the South Dorset constituency in Dorset under the boundaries created by the 2023 boundary review and first used at the 2024 general election. |
| West Dorset CC | 75,390 | 7,789 | Edward Morello¤ | Chris Loder† | Map showing the location of the West Dorset constituency in Dorset under the boundaries created by the 2023 boundary review and first used at the 2024 general election. |

== 2024 Boundary changes ==
See 2023 review of Westminster constituencies for further details.

| Name | Boundaries 2010–2024 | Boundaries 2024–present |
|---|---|---|
| 1. Bournemouth East BC; 2. Bournemouth West BC; 3. Christchurch CC; 4. Mid Dorset and North Poole CC; 5. North Dorset CC; 6. Poole BC; 7. South Dorset CC; 8. West Dorset CC | Proposed revision | Numbered map of the parliamentary constituencies of Dorset created by the 2023 boundary review and first used at the 2024 UK general election. |

For the 2023 review of Westminster constituencies, which redrew the constituency map ahead of the 2024 United Kingdom general election, the Boundary Commission for England opted to retain the eight current constituencies in Dorset, with minor boundary changes to reflect changes to ward boundaries following the reorganisation of local government authorities within the county.

The boundary commission recommended the following seats within Dorset:

Containing electoral wards from Bournemouth, Christchurch and Poole

- Bournemouth East
- Bournemouth West
- Christchurch (part)
- Mid Dorset and North Poole (part)
- Poole

Containing electoral wards from Dorset (unitary authority)

- Christchurch (part)
- Mid Dorset and North Poole (part)
- North Dorset
- South Dorset
- West Dorset

== Results history ==
Primary data source: House of Commons research briefing - General election results from 1918 to 2019

=== 2024 ===
The number of votes cast for each political party who fielded candidates in constituencies comprising Dorset in the 2024 general election were as follows:

| Party | Votes | % | Change from 2019 | Seats | Change from 2019 |
|---|---|---|---|---|---|
| Conservative | 127,188 | 33.7% | ▼24.6% | 2 | ▼6 |
| Liberal Democrats | 95,463 | 25.3% | ▲6.4% | 2 | ▲2 |
| Labour | 82,652 | 21.9% | ▲3.5% | 4 | ▲4 |
| Reform | 45,367 | 12.0% | New | 0 | Steady |
| Greens | 18,400 | 4.9% | ▲1.0% | 0 | Steady |
| Others | 8,287 | 2.2% | ▲1.7% | 0 | Steady |
| Total | 377,357 | 100.0 | | 8 | |

=== Percentage votes ===
Note that before 1983 Dorset did not include the Bournemouth and Christchurch areas (see below).

| Election year | 1922 | 1923 | 1924 | 1929 | 1931 | 1935 | 1945 | 1950 | 1951 | 1955 | 1959 | 1964 | 1966 | 1970 | 1974(F) | 1974(O) | 1979 | 1983 | 1987 | 1992 | 1997 | 2001 | 2005 | 2010 | 2015 | 2017 | 2019 | 2024 |
|---|---|---|---|---|---|---|---|---|---|---|---|---|---|---|---|---|---|---|---|---|---|---|---|---|---|---|---|---|
| Conservative | 39.1 | 51.7 | 60.1 | 46.2 | 56.8 | 54.0 | 45.2 | 47.6 | 52.2 | 53.9 | 52.4 | 46.6 | 47.3 | 54.2 | 48.1 | 48.0 | 58.4 | 58.6 | 57.8 | 54.5 | 41.8 | 45.3 | 44.1 | 48.3 | 51.7 | 58.7 | 58.3 | 33.7 |
| Liberal Democrat^{1} | 18.0 | 28.9 | 21.9 | 36.8 | 16.3 | 28.7 | 24.0 | 14.5 | 15.8 | 13.6 | 18.9 | 23.6 | 20.2 | 17.0 | 30.9 | 28.4 | 20.9 | 29.7 | 30.8 | 31.2 | 34.1 | 31.5 | 32.8 | 32.8 | 12.9 | 12.8 | 18.9 | 25.3 |
| Labour | 21.4 | 19.4 | 18.0 | 17.0 | 12.3 | 16.0 | 30.8 | 37.9 | 32.0 | 32.6 | 28.7 | 29.8 | 32.5 | 28.8 | 21.0 | 23.6 | 20.4 | 10.2 | 11.3 | 13.4 | 18.8 | 21.1 | 18.3 | 12.2 | 13.0 | 25.2 | 18.4 | 21.9 |
| Reform | - | - | - | - | - | - | - | - | - | - | - | - | - | - | - | - | - | - | - | - | - | - | - | - | - | - | - | 12.0 |
| Green Party | - | - | - | - | - | - | - | - | - | - | - | - | - | - | - | - | - | - | * | * | * | * | * | 0.5 | 5.3 | 2.6 | 3.9 | 4.9 |
| UKIP | - | - | - | - | - | - | - | - | - | - | - | - | - | - | - | - | - | - | - | - | * | * | * | 5.6 | 16.2 | 0.3 | * | * |
| Other | 21.5 | - | - | - | 14.6 | 1.4 | - | - | - | - | - | - | - | - | - | - | 0.3 | 1.4 | 0.1 | 0.9 | 5.3 | 2.1 | 4.7 | 0.6 | 0.9 | 0.4 | 0.5 | 2.2 |

^{1}1950-1979: Liberal Party; 1983 & 1987 - SDP–Liberal Alliance

* Included in Other

Accurate vote percentages are not applicable for the 1918 election because one candidate stood unopposed.

=== Seats ===
| Election year | 1950-1979 | 1983-1992 | 1997 | 2001-2005 | 2010 | 2015-2019 | 2024 |
|---|---|---|---|---|---|---|---|
| Labour | 0 | 0 | 0 | 1 | 0 | 0 | 4 |
| Conservative | 4 | 7 | 8 | 6 | 7 | 8 | 2 |
| Liberal Democrat^{1} | 0 | 0 | 0 | 1 | 1 | 0 | 2 |
| Total | 4 | 7 | 8 | 8 | 8 | 8 | 8 |

^{1}1950-1979: Liberal Party; 1983 & 1987 - SDP–Liberal Alliance

=== Maps ===
==== 1885-1910 ====
1885

1886

1892

1895

1900

1906

Jan 1910

Dec 1910

==== 1918-1945 ====
1918

1922

1923

1924

1929

1931

1935

1945

==== 1950-1979 ====
1950

1951

1955

1959

1964

1966

1970

Feb 1974

Oct 1974

1979

==== 1983-present ====
1983

1987

1992

1997

2001

2005

2010

2015

2017

2019

2024

== Historical representation by party ==
A cell marked → (with a different colour background to the preceding cell) indicates that the previous MP continued to sit under a new party name.

=== Before 1885 ===
| Constituency | Established | Abolished |
|---|---|---|
| Bridport | 1295 | Redistribution of Seats Act 1885 |
| Corfe Castle | 1572 | Parliamentary Boundaries Act 1832 |
| Dorchester | 1295 | Redistribution of Seats Act 1885 |
| Dorset | 1290 | Redistribution of Seats Act 1885 |
| Lyme Regis | 1572 | Parliamentary Boundaries Act 1832 |
| Poole | 1362 | Redistribution of Seats Act 1885 |
| Shaftesbury | 1295 | Redistribution of Seats Act 1885 |
| Weymouth and Melcombe Regis | 1572 | Redistribution of Seats Act 1885 |
| Wareham | 1302 | Redistribution of Seats Act 1885 |

=== 1885 to 1918 ===
Conservative Liberal

| Constituency | 1885 | 1886 | 91 | 1892 | 95 | 1895 | 1900 | 04 | 05 | 1906 | Jan 10 | Dec 10 |
|---|---|---|---|---|---|---|---|---|---|---|---|---|
| Dorset East | Glyn | Bond | Napier Sturt | | | | | Lyell | | | H. Guest^{1} | F. Guest |
| Dorset North | Portman | | | Wingfield-Digby | | | | | Wills | | Baker | |
| Dorset South | Sturgis | C. Hambro | Brymer | | | | | | | Scarisbrick | A. Hambro | |
| Dorset West | Farquharson | | | | Williams | | | | | | | |

^{1}original candidate, F. Guest (Lib), disqualified; fresh by-election held June 1910

=== 1918 to 1950 ===
Coalition Liberal (1918-22) / National Liberal (1922-23) Conservative Independent Conservative Liberal

| Constituency | 1918 | 1922 | 23 | 1923 | 1924 | 1929 | 1931 | 1935 | 37 | 41 | 1945 |
|---|---|---|---|---|---|---|---|---|---|---|---|
| Dorset East | → | Caine | → | | | Glassey | Caine | | | | Wheatley |
| Dorset North | Colfox | Emlyn-Jones | | | Hanbury | | | | A. Hambro | | Byers |
| Dorset South | A. Hambro | Yerburgh | | | | Gascoyne-Cecil | | | | Montagu | |
| Dorset West | Williams | Colfox | | | | | | | | Digby | |

=== 1950 to 1983 ===
Conservative Labour

| Constituency | 1950 | 1951 | 1955 | 57 | 1959 | 62 | 1964 | 1966 | 1970 | Feb 1974 | Oct 1974 | 1979 |
|---|---|---|---|---|---|---|---|---|---|---|---|---|
| Dorset North | Crouch | | | Glyn | | | | | James | | | Baker |
| Dorset South | Montagu | | | | | Barnett | King | | | | | Gascoyne-Cecil |
| Dorset West | Digby | | | | | | | | | Spicer | | |
| Poole | Wheatley | Pilkington | | | | | Murton | | | | | Ward |

=== 1983 to present (7, then 8 MPs) ===
Conservative Independent Labour Liberal Democrats

| Constituency | 1983 | 1987 | 1992 | 93 | 1997 | 2001 | 2005 | 2010 | 2015 | 2017 | 19 | 2019 | 2024 |
|---|---|---|---|---|---|---|---|---|---|---|---|---|---|
| Bournemouth East | Atkinson | | | | | | Ellwood | | | | | | Hayes |
| Bournemouth West | Butterfill | | | | | | | Burns | | | | | Toale |
| Christchurch | Adley | | | Maddock | Chope | | | | | | | | |
| North Dorset | Baker | | | | Walter | | | | Hoare | | | | |
| Poole | Ward | | | | Syms | | | | | | | | Duncan-Jordan |
| South Dorset | Gascoyne-Cecil | Bruce | | | | Knight | | Drax | | | | | Hatton |
| West Dorset | Spicer | | | | Letwin | | | | | | → | Loder | Morello |
| Mid Dorset and North Poole | Seat not created | | | | Fraser | Brooke | | | Tomlinson | | | | Slade |

== See also ==
- Parliamentary constituencies in South West England
