= Letwin =

Letwin is a surname with Yiddish origins. It may refer to:

- Gordon Letwin (born 1952), American software developer
- Michael Letwin (born 1956), American public defense lawyer
- Oliver Letwin (born 1956), British politician
- Shirley Robin Letwin (1924–1993), American academic
- William Letwin (1922–2013), American academic
