= Colfox =

Colfox is a surname. Notable people with the surname include:

- Nicholas Colfox (fl. 1400), English knight
- Philip Colfox (1888–1966), English soldier, farmer, and politician
- Colfox baronets
