= West Dorset by-election =

West Dorset by-election may refer to:

- 1895 West Dorset by-election
- 1941 West Dorset by-election
