= George Harold Newsom =

George Harold Newsom (29 December 1909 – 14 February 1992) was a British Liberal Party politician and barrister.

== Background ==
He was the eldest son of the Reverend G.E. Newsom, Master of Selwyn College, Cambridge, and Alethea Mary Awdry. He was educated at Marlborough College and Merton College, Oxford where he was awarded a 2nd Class degree in Literae Humaniores in 1931 and a 1st Class degree in Jurisprudence in 1932. He was a Harmsworth Senior Scholar and a Cholmeley Student in 1933. He married, in 1939, Margaret Amy Allen; they had two sons and one daughter.

== Legal career ==
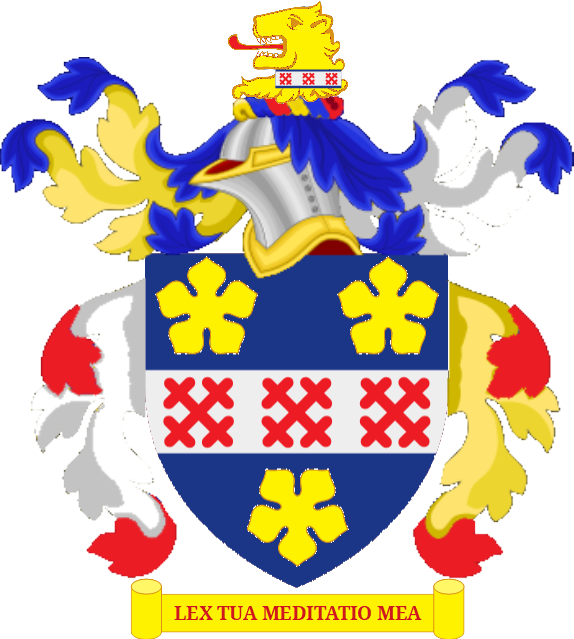
Armorial achievement

In 1934 he was called to the bar at Lincoln's Inn. He practised at Chancery Bar from 1934 to 1979. He was a Junior Counsel to the Charity Commissioners from 1947 to 1956. He was also Conveyancing Counsel to the PO from 1947 to 1956. He was a Member of the General Council of the Bar from 1952 to 1956. In 1956 he was appointed a Queen's Counsel. In 1962 he became a Bencher of Lincoln's Inn. He was Deputy Chairman of the Wiltshire Quarterly Sessions from 1964 to 1971. He was Visiting Professor in Law, at Auckland University, New Zealand in 1971. He served as a Recorder of the Crown Court from 1972 to 1974.

== Publications ==
- Restrictive Covenants affecting Freehold land (1940, with Cecil H.S. Preston, d. 30 May 1940 Dunkirk, Veurne) to 7th edition (1982, assisted by George L. Newsom)
- Limitation of Actions (1939, with C.H.S. Preston) to 3rd edition 1953 with 1954 supplement (both with Lionel Abel-Smith)
- The Discharge and Modification of Restrictive Covenants, 1957
- Water Pollution, 1972 (with J. Graham Sherratt)
- The Faculty Jurisdiction of the Church of England (1988) and 2nd Edition posthumously (1993, with George L. Newsom)

== Wartime ==
He worked at the Ministry of Economic Warfare from 1939 to 1940 and then the Trading with the Enemy Department, at the Treasury and the Board of Trade from 1940 to 1945.

== Political career ==
He was selected at the last minute to be Liberal candidate for the Dorset West It was a promising seat for the Liberal Party, with a Conservative majority of only 2,000 at the previous General Election in 1935. However, then Labour had not contested the seat but in 1945 they intervened;

General Election 1945: West Dorset Electorate 35,780
Party	Candidate	Votes	%	±%
Conservative	Simon Digby	13,399	50.1	
Labour	C. John Kane	8,215	30.8	
Liberal	George Newsom	5,098	19.1	
Majority		5,184	19.3	
Turnout			74.7	
Conservative hold		Swing		

He did not stand for parliament again.

== Religion ==
He was Chancellor of the Diocese of St Albans from 1958, of the Diocese of London from 1971 and of the Diocese of Bath and Wells from 1971.
