= Wessex (European Parliament constituency) =

Former European Parliament constituency

- European Parliament constituency
- Boundary within South West England (1979-1984)
- Member state: United Kingdom
- Created: 1979
- Dissolved: 1984
- MEPs: 1

Wessex was a European Parliament constituency covering all of Dorset in England, plus parts of western Hampshire and southern Wiltshire. It was named after the Anglo-Saxon Kingdom of Wessex.

Prior to its uniform adoption of proportional representation in 1999, the United Kingdom used first-past-the-post for the European elections in England, Scotland and Wales. The European Parliament constituencies used under that system were smaller than the later regional constituencies and only had one Member of the European Parliament each.

The constituency consisted of the Westminster Parliament constituencies of Bournemouth East, Bournemouth West, Christchurch and Lymington, North Dorset, Poole, South Dorset, Westbury and West Dorset.

The constituency was replaced by much of Dorset East and Hampshire West and parts of Somerset and Dorset West and Wiltshire in 1984. Following further changes, these seats became part of the much larger South West England and South East England constituencies in 1999.

== Members of the European Parliament ==
Elected	Name	Party
1979	James Spicer	Conservative
1984	Constituency abolished	

== Results ==
European Parliament election, 1979: Wessex
Party	Candidate	Votes	%	±%
Conservative	James Spicer	130,744	63.3	
Labour	John Goss	42,910	20.8	
Liberal	W. M. Duncan	31,220	15.1	
Wessex Regionalist	Viscount Weymouth	1,706	0.8	
Majority		87,834	42.5	
Turnout		206,580	37.2	
Conservative win (new seat)				
