= Louie Simpson =

British political activist

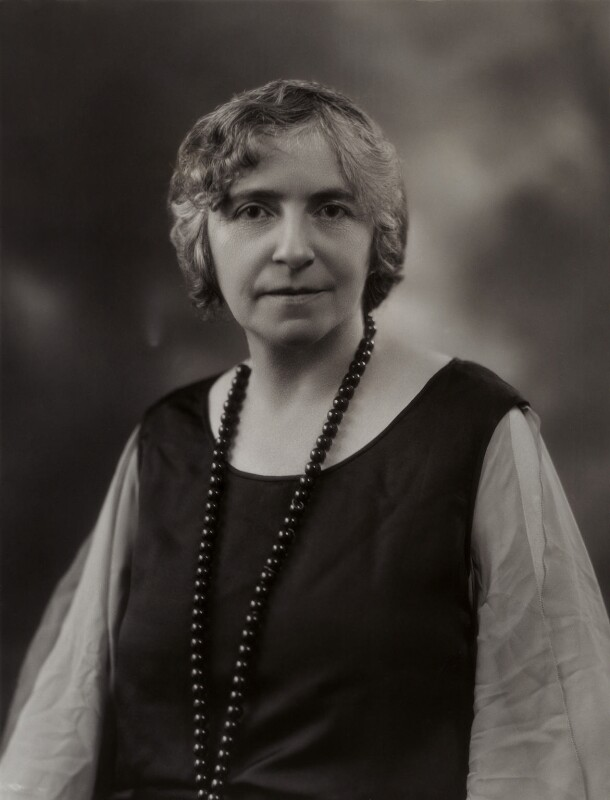
Simpson in 1924

Sarah Louisa Simpson (1854 – 10 February 1941) was a British political activist.

Born in Lambeth as Sarah Louisa Wilmott, she was educated privately, then at the College for the Higher Education of Christian Women in Clapham. She married Dr Robert Simpson in 1889, living initially in Bristol, then in 1895 the couple moved in Plymouth.

In Plymouth, Simpson became active in the Liberal Party, and in 1898 she was the only woman to win election to the town's Board of Guardians. In this role, she worked to improve conditions in the workhouse infirmary, served on the city's Distress Committee, and from 1910, chaired its Children's Committee.

Simpson was a founder member of the Plymouth branch of the National Union of Women’s Suffrage Societies, in 1909. During World War I, she served with the Medical Electrical Treatment Mission. After the war, she joined the Labour Party, and in 1919 was elected to the town's borough council, representing Stoke ward, one of the first two women councillors in the town. In 1919, she was appointed as a magistrate, one of the 172 women appointed on the first day they were permitted to hold the position.

In 1921, the Simpsons moved to Edmonton, near London, although Louie remained a magistrate in Plymouth and visited the town regularly. At the 1923, she stood unsuccessfully in West Dorset, taking second place with 41.2% of the vote. She was the Labour Party's only woman candidate in the West of England. The Times noted that her main policy was for international peace, and she worked hard to win the votes of Liberal Party supporters, addressing 17 meetings in just one day. She stood again in the seat at the 1924 UK general election, but fell to only 31.7% of the vote.

Simpson was later elected to the Edmonton Board of Guardians, also serving on the Middlesex Education Committee and the Enfield Labour Exchange. She died in Winchmore Hill in 1941.
