= Edward Morello =

British politician

Edward Morello MP
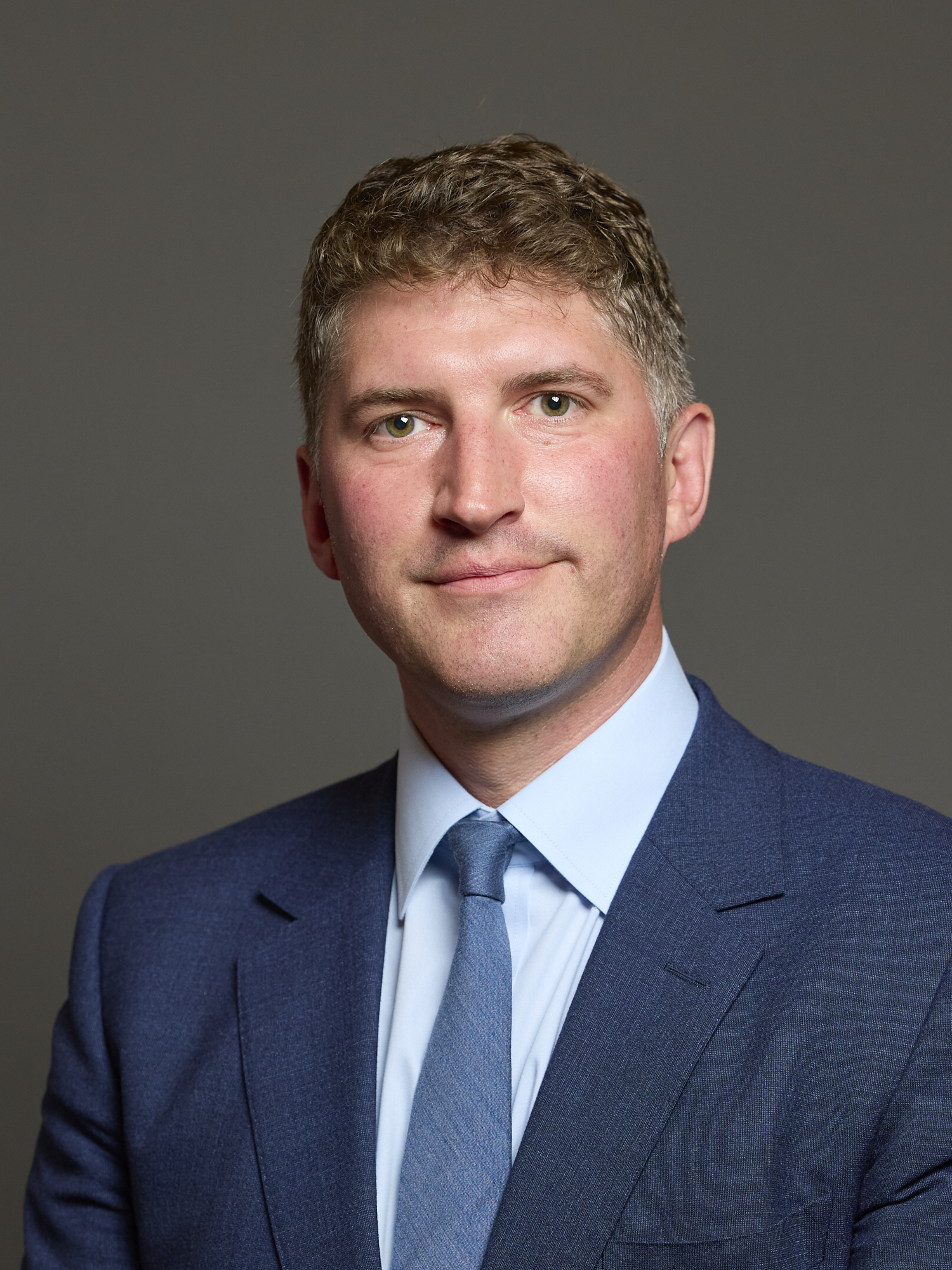
- Official portrait, 2024

Member of Parliament for West Dorset
- Incumbent
- Assumed office 4 July 2024
- Preceded by: Chris Loder
- Majority: 7,789 (14.6%)

Personal details
- Born: Robin Edward Charles Morello
- Party: Liberal Democrats
- Children: 1
- Education: Aberystwyth University

Robin Edward Charles Morello is a British politician who has been the Member of Parliament for West Dorset since 2024. A member of the Liberal Democrats, he gained the seat from Chris Loder of the Conservatives.

Morello is an environmentalist who has worked in renewable energy investment.

== Early life ==
Morello was educated at Sir Henry Floyd Grammar School in Aylesbury, with 10 GCSEs in 1998 at grade A, and took Economics, History and Politics A-levels in 2000. He studied International Relations at Aberystwyth University.

== Political career ==
He won the seat of West Dorset with a majority of 7,789. He is the first non-Conservative MP since the creation of the constituency in 1885. Morello first stood for Parliament in the 2019 general election. He has served on the Foreign Affairs Select Committee since 2024.

== Personal life ==
Morello lives in Bridport with his wife Keira and their son.

Parliament of the United Kingdom
Preceded by Chris Loder	Member of Parliament for West Dorset; 2024–present	Incumbent
