= Chris Loder =

British politician (born 1981)

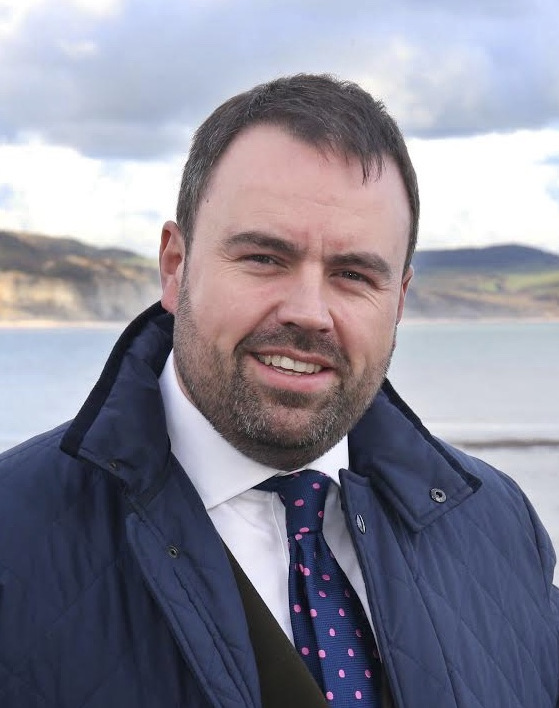
- Loder in 2020

Member of Parliament for West Dorset
- In office 12 December 2019 – 30 May 2024
- Preceded by: Oliver Letwin
- Succeeded by: Edward Morello

Personal details
- Born: 5 September 1981 (age 44) Sherborne, Dorset, England
- Party: Conservative
- Occupation: Politician

Christopher Lionel John Loder (born 5 September 1981) is a British Conservative politician who served as the Member of Parliament (MP) for West Dorset from 2019 to 2024.

== Early life and career ==
Christopher Loder was born on 5 September 1981 in Sherborne. He grew up near Folke in Dorset on his parents' farm and attended The Gryphon School in Sherborne. Aged 18, he joined South West Trains as a train guard. He stayed in the rail industry, rising to becoming head of new trains for South Western Railway, until his election to Parliament in 2019.

== Political career ==
=== Local government career ===
Loder became parish clerk for Bishops Caundle in 1998, and was awarded the young person's merit award for commitment to the local community. He was elected to West Dorset District Council to represent the ward of Cam Vale in a 2013 by-election. The district was subject to a boundary review and Loder was not re-elected in 2015 when the seat became a two-member ward. Loder was chairman of West Dorset Conservatives for more than three years until August 2019.

=== Parliamentary career ===
At the 2019 general election, Loder was elected to Parliament as MP for West Dorset with 55.1% of the vote and a majority of 14,106.

He was a member of the Common Sense Group which represents the socially conservative wing of the Conservative Party. Following an interim report on the connections between colonialism and properties now in the care of the National Trust, including links with historic slavery, Loder was among the signatories of a letter to The Daily Telegraph in November 2020 from the Common Sense Group. The letter accused the National Trust of being "coloured by cultural Marxist dogma, colloquially known as the 'woke agenda'".

Loder attracted controversy in February 2022, when he implied police should not prioritise investigating the death of a white-tailed eagle, after it emerged he received a £14,000 donation from Ilchester Estates, who operate shoots in his constituency. The police investigation was later abruptly closed.

In February 2024, Loder was re-selected as the Conservative candidate for West Dorset at the 2024 general election, but lost the seat to Liberal Democrat challenger Edward Morello by 26,999 votes to 19,210, a margin of 7,789. Notably this historic defeat meant that he became the first Conservative ever to have lost in West Dorset since the constituency was created in 1885.

== Post-parliamentary career ==
Following his defeat at the 2024 UK General Election, Loder has worked as a freelance adviser on infrastructure issues.

== Personal life ==
One of Loder's hobbies is bell ringing at local churches in Dorset.

Parliament of the United Kingdom
Preceded by Oliver Letwin	Member of Parliament for West Dorset; 2019–2024	Succeeded by Edward Morello
