= Philip Colfox =

British politician

Lieutenant-Colonel Sir Philip Colfox Bt MC DL JP
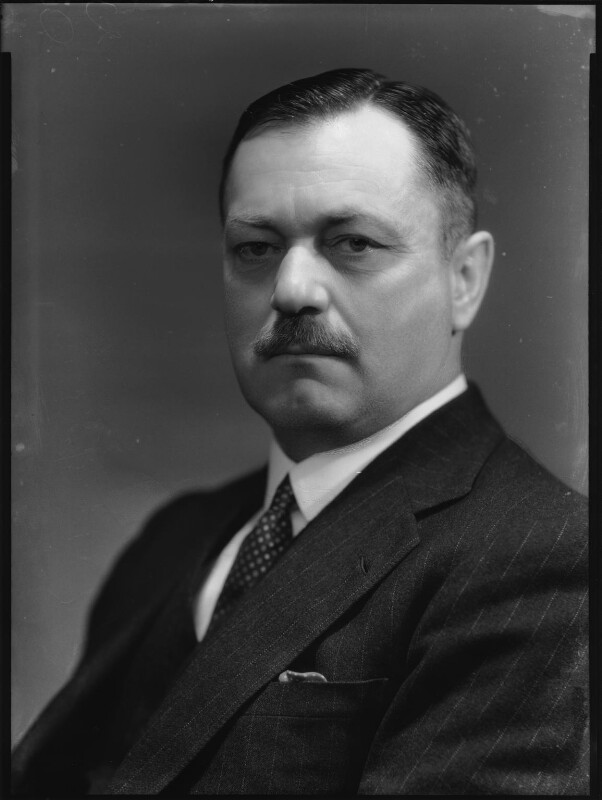

Member of Parliament
- In office 15 November 1922 – 21 June 1941
- Preceded by: Robert Williams
- Succeeded by: Simon Wingfield Digby
- Constituency: West Dorset
- In office 14 December 1918 – 15 November 1922
- Preceded by: Randolf Littlehales Baker
- Succeeded by: John Emlyn-Jones
- Constituency: North Dorset

Personal details
- Born: William Phillip Colfox; 25 February 1888 Bridport, Dorset, United Kingdom
- Died: 8 November 1966 (aged 78) Symondsbury, Dorset, United Kingdom
- Party: Conservative
- Spouse: Mary Bullen (1920-1966; his death)
- Children: 4
- Education: Eton College
- Occupation: Politician, farmer, former soldier

Sir William Philip Colfox, 1st Baronet, MC, DL, JP (25 February 1888 – 8 November 1966) was an English soldier, farmer and Conservative Party politician.

== Early life and military career ==
Colfox was the son of Colonel Thomas Alfred Colfox of Coneygar, Bridport, and Constance, daughter of Edward John Nettlefold of Hallfield, Birmingham. Born in Bridport, Dorset, he was educated at Eton College and at Woolwich. Serving in 132 Royal Field Artillery (RFA) in Fermoy 1908-9 and Ewshott 1909-12 he joined 14 RFA at Allahabad 1912-14 and Secunderabad 1914. He served as a Major in France and Belgium in 128, 130, 129, G/38, 6DAC and D/162 RFA during World War I, and was wounded twice in 1917, receiving a Military Cross. He then taught classics and mathematics at Eton for the rest of World War I. In later life, when fully retired, he taught mathematics to children in Bridport as a volunteer.

== Political career ==
His father had started as a Liberal, but Colfox followed his mother's family – which included Joseph Chamberlain (Founder of the National Liberal Federation, Liberal Unionist Association and National Radical Union), his sons Austen and Neville Chamberlain — first to become Liberal or Radical Unionists then Unionists and later Conservative Unionists.

At the 1918 general election, Colfox was elected as Member of Parliament (MP) for Dorset North as a Coalition Unionist (majority 212) becoming in 1920 Private Secretary (unpaid) to Parliamentary Secretary to the Ministry of Pensions (George Tryon) and in 1921 Private Secretary (unpaid) to Parliamentary Under-Secretary of State for the Colonies (Hon EFL Wood - Lord Halifax).

At the 1922 general election, he was returned to the House of Commons as MP for Dorset West with a majority of 4,548. Between 1922 and 1923 he was Assistant Government Whip.

In 1923 and 1924, he held the seat as a Unionist (majorities 3,013 and 6,662) and outspoken backbencher and from 1925 as a Conservative Unionist.

At the 1929 election, his majority was 4,326; in 1931, 5,239; and in 1935 it reduced to 2,090 following disparaging remarks made about his opponent Mr Chapel, a Welsh Methodist minister.

Refusing lesser honours, Colfox accepted a baronetcy in 1939 from his cousin Neville Chamberlain, speaking in the debate following the latter's resignation in support of the outgoing Prime Minister. He held the seat until his retirement in 1941. He served as High Sheriff of Dorset for 1946. He remained an Alderman of Dorset County Council until he died in 1966. He ran his farm based on sound organic principles in conjunction with his son John.

During World War II, he ran the West Dorset Home Guard as Lt Col. An inspection by the War Office recorded that he ran it in a most independent fashion. Mary, Lady Colfox recalled that he was irritated by this inspection saying: "What do they know about running a war in London?"

== Family history ==
Six hundred years after Sir Nicholas Colfox (on the instructions of Richard II and his feudal lord, the Duke of Norfolk) was involved in the murder of the King's uncle, Thomas of Woodstock, Duke of Gloucester (1397), Sir Philip had returned Colfoxs to the national scene. Sir Nicholas was pardoned by King Henry IV in 1404.

Colfox's family had a long connection with Symondsbury, Bridport. The family is first mentioned in the town records in 1280. In 1357 Peter Colfox was commissioned by Edward III to rebuild Marshwood Castle, sold by Colfox's brother-in-law in the early 20th century. In 1394, Sir William Colfox, Vicar of Chilthorne Dommer near Yeovil, witnessed an Inquisition relating to part of the Manor of Symondsbury which Sir William Philip Colfox inherited in 1924.

== Personal life ==
In 1920, he married Mary Frances Bullen (1892–1973), the daughter of John Bullen Symes Bullen of Catherston, Charmouth Dorset. They had 2 sons and 2 daughters: Thomas Andrew (1922–1936), (William) John (2nd Bart) (1924–2014), Susan Frances (1929–), and Bridget Alice (1931–2016).

He was a Unitarian worshipping in the Chapel in Bridport built by his ancestor Thomas Collins Colfox in 1797. In Bridport, he continued to teach children Mathematics and Classics and was Chairman of the Governors of the Colfox School, so-named in honour of his father who had given the land and refounded the previous Unitarian grammar school.

Sir Philip and cars were a notorious combination - he parked his car in Bridport perpendicularly to the pavement and policemen were warned that everyone else but him were to be fined. A daughter was asked at a party in Kent - "Are you related to that bad driver from Dorset?"

Colfoxes had been on the Bridport Bench as magistrates continually since the 15th century. On one occasion Sir Philip, Lady Colfox (and her brother, Jack Bullen) heard a misdemeanour offence against the couple's son charged by the police for the road traffic offence of leaving mud on a public road - which he freely admitted. John was defended by his brother-in-law. His father, mother and uncle found him not guilty and awarded costs against the police. This made local press but only in inside pages in 1950.

== Arms ==
Coat of arms of Philip Colfox
Crest A fox Proper, charged on the body with two fleur-de-lys in fess Sable and resting the sinister paw on a fleur-de-lis Gules. Escutcheon Sable, three spinning-cogs erect and in fess Or, on a chief Argent as many fox-heads couped at the neck Gules. Motto Lux Lex Libertas

Parliament of the United Kingdom
Preceded by Sir Randolf Littlehales Baker	Member of Parliament for North Dorset; 1918 – 1922	Succeeded by John Emlyn-Jones
Preceded by Sir Robert Williams, Bt.	Member of Parliament for West Dorset; 1922 – 1941	Succeeded by Simon Wingfield Digby
Baronetage of the United Kingdom
New creation	Baronet (of Symondsbury); 1939 – 1966	Succeeded by William John Colfox
