= Neil Duncan-Jordan =

British politician

Neil Duncan-Jordan MP
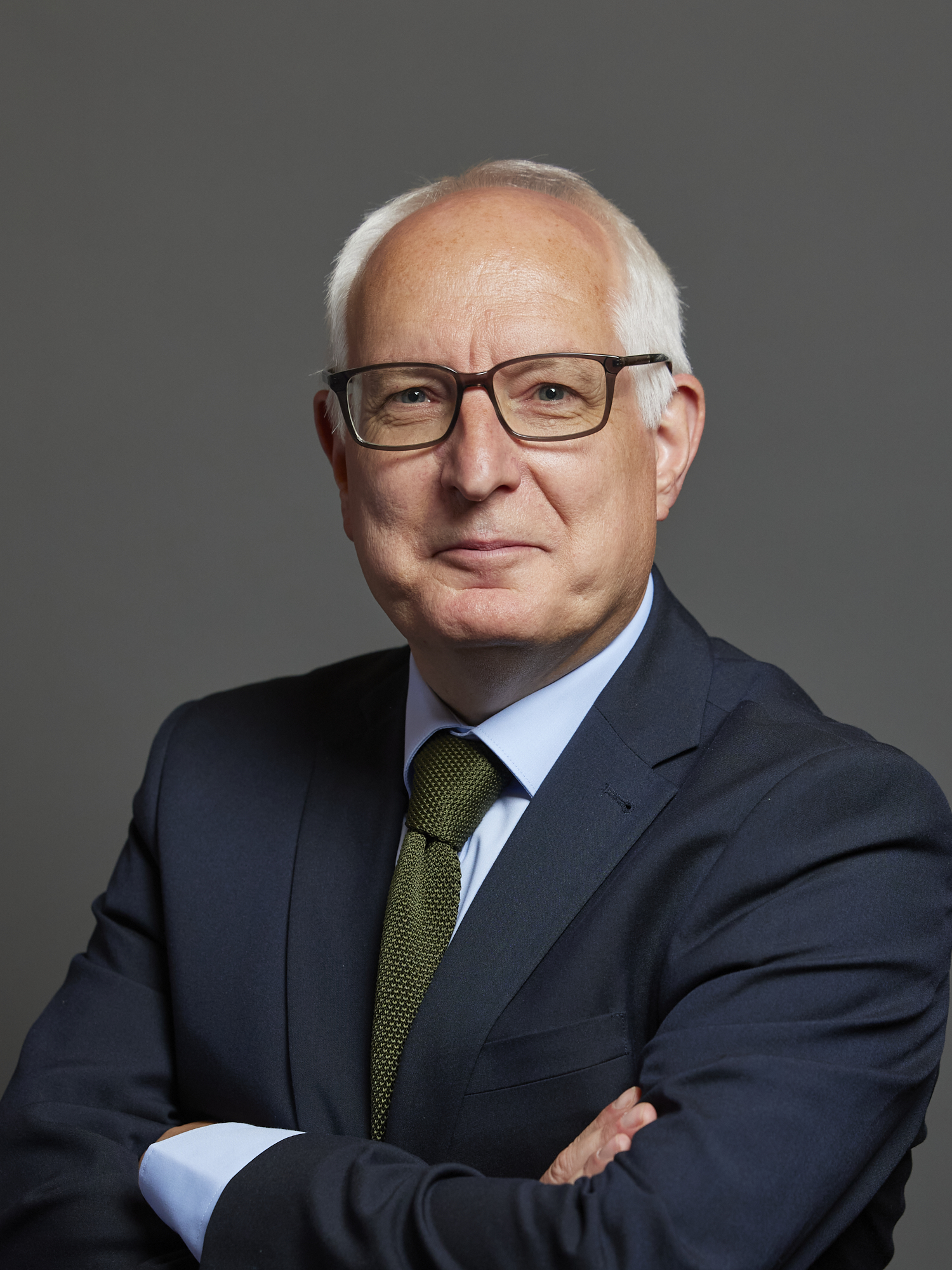
- Official portrait, 2024

Member of Parliament for Poole
- Incumbent
- Assumed office 4 July 2024
- Preceded by: Robert Syms
- Majority: 18 (0.04%)

Personal details
- Born: Neil John Duncan-Jordan Elm Park, London, England
- Party: Labour
- Education: University of Bournemouth
- Website: Official website

Neil John Duncan-Jordan is a British politician and trade unionist, who has been Member of Parliament for Poole since 2024. He is the first Labour politician to be elected in the constituency since its recreation in 1950.

== Early career ==
Duncan-Jordan was born in the late 1960s in Elm Park, East London. His parents were also born in London's East End. His father worked for British Rail and his mother worked part-time in a shop. His mother came from a Jewish immigrant family. As a young father in his late twenties, he studied journalism at the University of Bournemouth. He was the first in his extended family to get a degree.

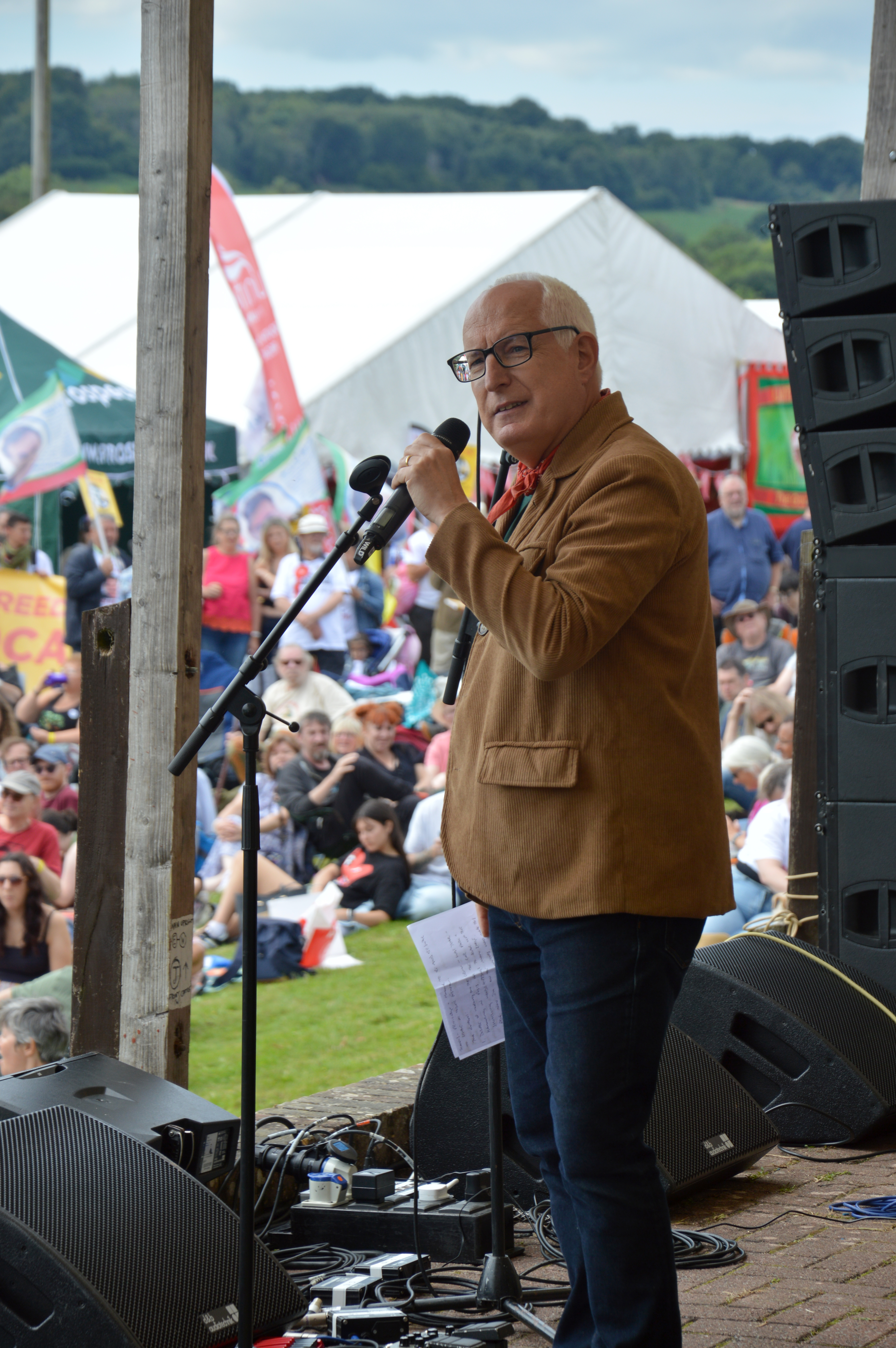
Neil Duncan-Jordan speaking at the 2024 Tolpuddle Martyrs' Festival, 17 days after his election to Parliament.

Duncan-Jordan first worked for the National Pensioners Convention. Prior to his general election win, he was a regional officer for Unison.

== Political career ==
In the 2024 General Election, Duncan-Jordan stood as the Labour Party candidate for the seat of Poole. After multiple recounts, it was confirmed that he had been elected Member of Parliament (MP) with 14,168 votes (31.84%), and a majority of 18 votes. The final result showed a 19% swing to Labour and was the first time the party had won that seat.

In September 2024, he abstained on a vote on the Winter Fuel Payment. He opposes the proposed sale of Poole Civic Centre. He supports the renationalisation of the water industry. In March 2025, he criticised the spring statement. Duncan-Jordan has been a vocal critic of the Government’s proposed cuts to disability benefits.

On 16 July 2025, Duncan-Jordan was suspended from the Labour Party and had the whip withdrawn following persistent breaches of party discipline, including rebelling against proposed welfare cuts and refusing to support the party's revised disability benefits policy. In response to his suspension, Duncan-Jordan stated that he "understood this could come at a cost" but felt he "couldn't support making disabled people poorer." He affirmed his long-standing commitment to Labour values, saying he had been part of the Labour and trade union movement for 40 years and remained "as committed as ever." He also reassured constituents that he would continue representing Poole while suspended as a Labour MP. On 7 November 2025, the whip was restored.. Duncan-Jordan is a leading voice for animals rights and is actively campaigning for an end to greyhound racing.

In May 2026, he called on Keir Starmer to resign and said he would support Andy Burnham to replace him.

Parliament of the United Kingdom
Preceded by Robert Syms	Member of Parliament for Poole; 2024–present	Incumbent
