= Colfox baronets =

Baronetcy in the Baronetage of the United Kingdom

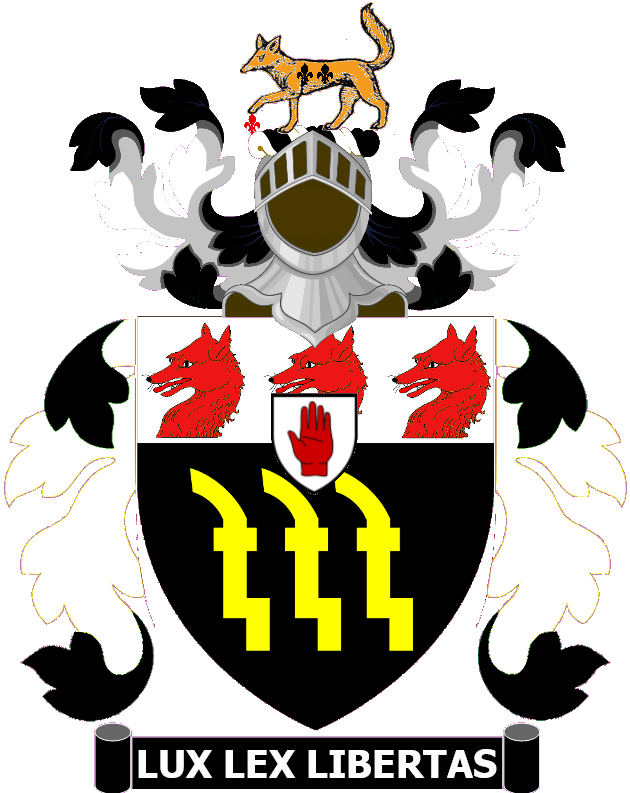
- Crest: A fox Proper, charged on the body with two fleur-de-lys in fess Sable and resting the sinister paw on a fleur-de-lis Gules.
- Shield: Sable, three spinning-cogs erect and in fess Or, on a chief Argent as many fox-heads couped at the neck Gules.
- Motto: Lux Lex Libertas

The Colfox Baronetcy, of Symondsbury in the County of Dorset, is a title in the Baronetage of the United Kingdom. It was created on 4 July 1939 for the Conservative politician Philip Colfox. He was succeeded by his younger and only surviving son, the second Baronet, who was a Deputy Lieutenant of Dorset in 1977. Following the second baronet's death in 2014, the title was then held by his elder son.

== Colfox baronets, of Symondsbury (1939) ==
- Sir (William) Philip Colfox, 1st Baronet (1888–1966)
- Sir (William) John Colfox, 2nd Baronet (1924–2014)
- Sir Philip John Colfox, 3rd Baronet (born 1962)

The Heir Apparent to the baronetcy is John Alfred Colfox (born 2000), only son of the 3rd Baronet.
