= Henry Richard Farquharson =

English landowner and politician

The Right Honourable Henry Richard Farquharson PC

Member of Parliament for West Dorset
- In office 1885 – 19 April 1895
- Preceded by: Constituency established
- Succeeded by: Robert Williams

Personal details
- Born: 1857 Brighton, East Sussex, England
- Died: 19 April 1895 (aged 37–38) Red Sea, Indian Ocean
- Party: Conservative
- Spouse(s): Constance Farquharson (1878-1895; his death)
- Occupation: Landowner

Henry Richard Farquharson (1857 – 19 April 1895) was an English landowner and Conservative politician.

== Biography ==
Farquharson was born at Brighton and became the owner of a large estate at Eastbury House, Tarrant Gunville (near Blandford Forum in Dorset). He was a keen breeder of Newfoundland dogs and had a pack of one hundred and twenty five. He imported them through the port of Poole, Dorset and had a Crufts winner.

He was elected at the 1885 general election as Member of Parliament (MP) for West Dorset, and held the seat until his death. In 1891, an unnamed West of England M.P., now believed to have been Henry Richard Farquharson, was mentioned in a newspaper article as claiming that Jack the Ripper, the infamous murderer in the impoverished Whitechapel District in the East End of London, was the son of a surgeon and that he committed suicide after he had committed the murder of Mary Jane Kelly on the night of 9 November 1888. It is believed that the reference was to Montague John Druitt, a fellow West Country man, who committed suicide at the end of November 1888 and whose body was retrieved from the Thames at Chiswick a month later. Druitt was born in Wimborne Minster, Dorset, England, the second son of prominent local surgeon William Druitt, and his wife Ann (née Harvey).

In the 1892 election, Farquharson libelled his opponent Charles Tindal Gatty, by saying he had been expelled from Charterhouse School for immorality, and was ordered to pay £5,000 damages a year later. This was reduced to £2,500 on appeal.

He died on 19 April 1895, in the Red Sea, on a voyage home from Colombo, Ceylon.

Parliament of the United Kingdom
| New constituency | Member of Parliament for West Dorset; 1885 – 1895 | Succeeded by Robert Williams |
