= John Ward (Conservative politician) =

British politician

Member of Parliament for Poole
- In office 3 May 1979 – 8 April 1997
- Preceded by: Oscar Murton
- Succeeded by: Robert Syms

Personal details
- Born: 8 March 1925
- Died: 26 June 2010 (aged 85)
- Party: Conservative

Sir John Devereux Ward CBE (8 March 1925 – 26 June 2010) was a British Conservative Party politician.

== Early life ==
Trained as a civil and a structural engineer, he rose to become managing director of the construction firm Taylor Woodrow.

== Parliamentary career ==
After being beaten at Portsmouth North in October 1974, Ward served as the Member of Parliament (MP) for Poole from 1979, until his retirement in 1997. He was succeeded by Robert Syms.

After the 1988 BDH fire and explosion in Poole, he called on the government to set up a public inquiry into the incident.

From 1994 until the 1997 General Election, Ward was the Parliamentary Private Secretary to the Prime Minister, John Major. As such, he did not contribute in any debates during the last three years of his parliamentary career. Following Major's resignation as Prime Minister in May 1997, Ward was knighted in the 1997 Prime Minister's Resignation Honours.

== Death ==
Ward died suddenly on 26 June 2010 at the age of 85.

Parliament of the United Kingdom
Preceded by Oscar Murton	Member of Parliament for Poole; 1979–1997	Succeeded by Robert Syms
Government offices
Preceded by Graham Bright	Parliamentary Private Secretary to the Prime Minister; 1994–1997	Succeeded by Bruce Grocott; Ann Coffey
