= 1941 West Dorset by-election =

UK Parliamentary by-election

← 1935	21 June 1941	1945 →

West Dorset constituency
	First party
	Con
Candidate	Simon Wingfield Digby
Party	Conservative
Popular vote	Unopposed
MP before election
Philip Colfox
Conservative
Elected MP
Simon Wingfield Digby
Conservative

The 1941 West Dorset by-election was held on 21 June 1941. The by-election was held due to the resignation of the incumbent Conservative MP, Philip Colfox. It was won by the Conservative candidate Simon Wingfield Digby.

1941 West Dorset by-election
Party	Candidate	Votes	%	±%
Conservative	Simon Wingfield Digby	Unopposed	N/A	N/A
Conservative hold		Swing	N/A	
