= James Spicer =

British politician

Sir James Spicer
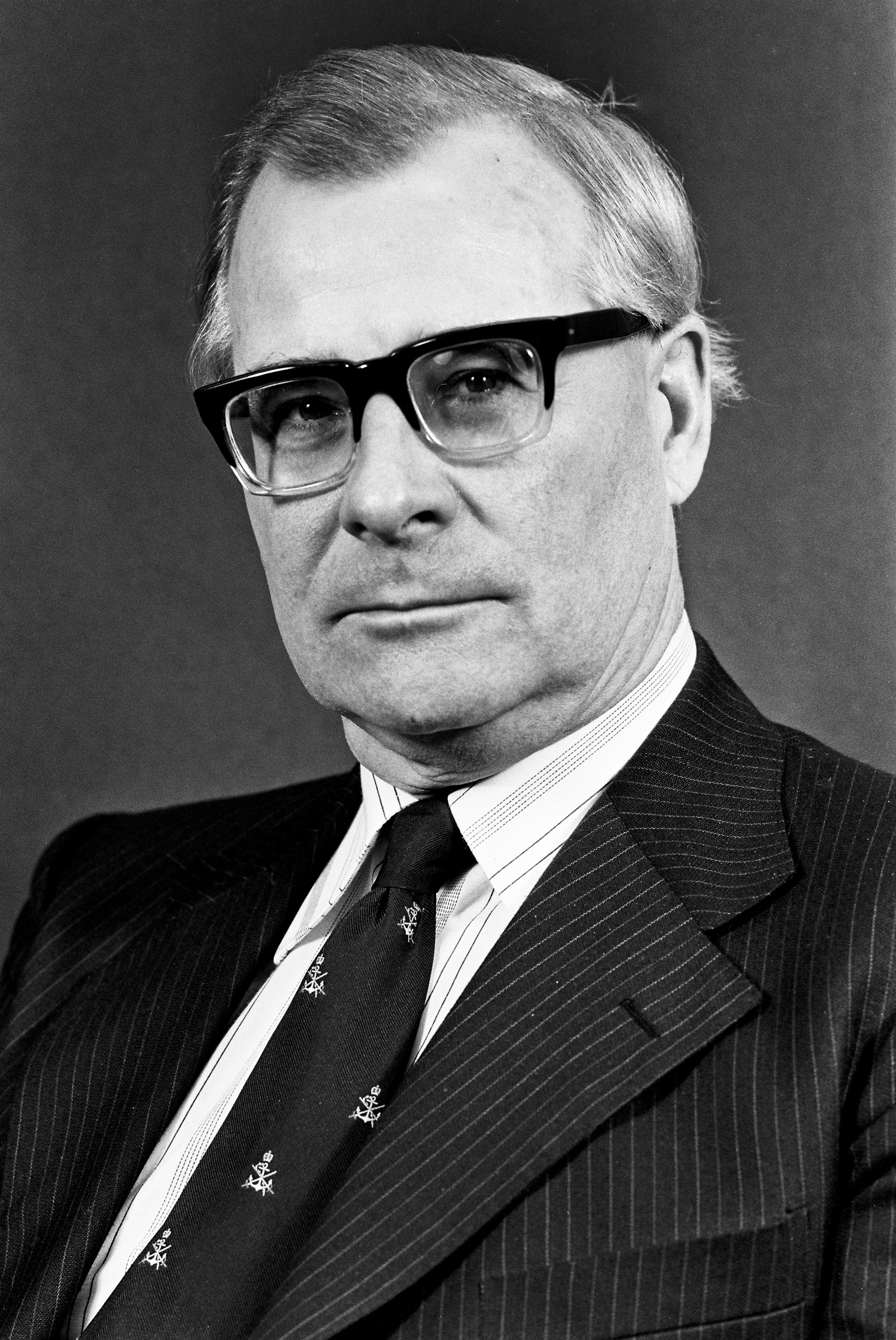

Member of Parliament for West Dorset
- In office 28 February 1974 – 8 April 1997
- Preceded by: Simon Wingfield Digby
- Succeeded by: Oliver Letwin

Member of the European Parliament for Wessex
- In office 7 June 1979 – 14 June 1984
- Preceded by: Constituency established
- Succeeded by: Constituency abolished

Personal details
- Born: James Wilton Spicer; 4 October 1925
- Died: 21 March 2015 (aged 89)
- Party: Conservative
- Spouse: Winifred Shanks (m. 1954; died 2010)
- Children: 2

Sir James Wilton Spicer (4 October 1925 – 21 March 2015), often known as Jim Spicer, was a British Conservative politician.

Spicer was Member of Parliament (MP) for West Dorset from February 1974 until he retired at the 1997 general election, when he was succeeded by Oliver Letwin. He was a vice-chairman of the Conservative Party, and was also the Member of the European Parliament (MEP) for Wessex from 1979 to 1984.

At 14, he was an air raid messenger in London during The Blitz. At 15, he was in a Commando Section of his local Home Guard. While at 16 he worked as a labourer in a scrap metal yard, before joining the army. Commissioned at 18, he served in North West Europe during the remainder of the Second World War and thereafter in Egypt, Kenya, Cyprus and finally in 1956, with the Parachute Regiment in the ill-fated attack on Port Said.

He resigned his commission and moved with his wife, Winfy, to Beaminster, where they farmed. Politics became a consuming interest; And in 1974, he became the MP for his own constituency of West Dorset. As a politician, he was considered to be on the Thatcherite wing of the Conservative Party, opposing sanctions against South Africa and the relaxation of immigration rules, and supporting the return of capital punishment. He served as a vice-chairman of the Conservative Party, chairman of the international office, Chief Whip in the European Parliament and finally, the first chairman of the Westminster Foundation for Democracy. During his long career, he had one-to-one meetings with Nicolae Ceausescu, Saddam Hussein, President Assad, Robert Mugabe and many other world leaders. He was well known for being the founder of the House of Commons gym in 1978.

Spicer died on 21 March 2015, at the age of 89.

Parliament of the United Kingdom
Preceded by Simon Wingfield Digby	Member of Parliament for West Dorset; February 1974 – 1997	Succeeded by Oliver Letwin
