= William Letwin =

Anglo-American academic

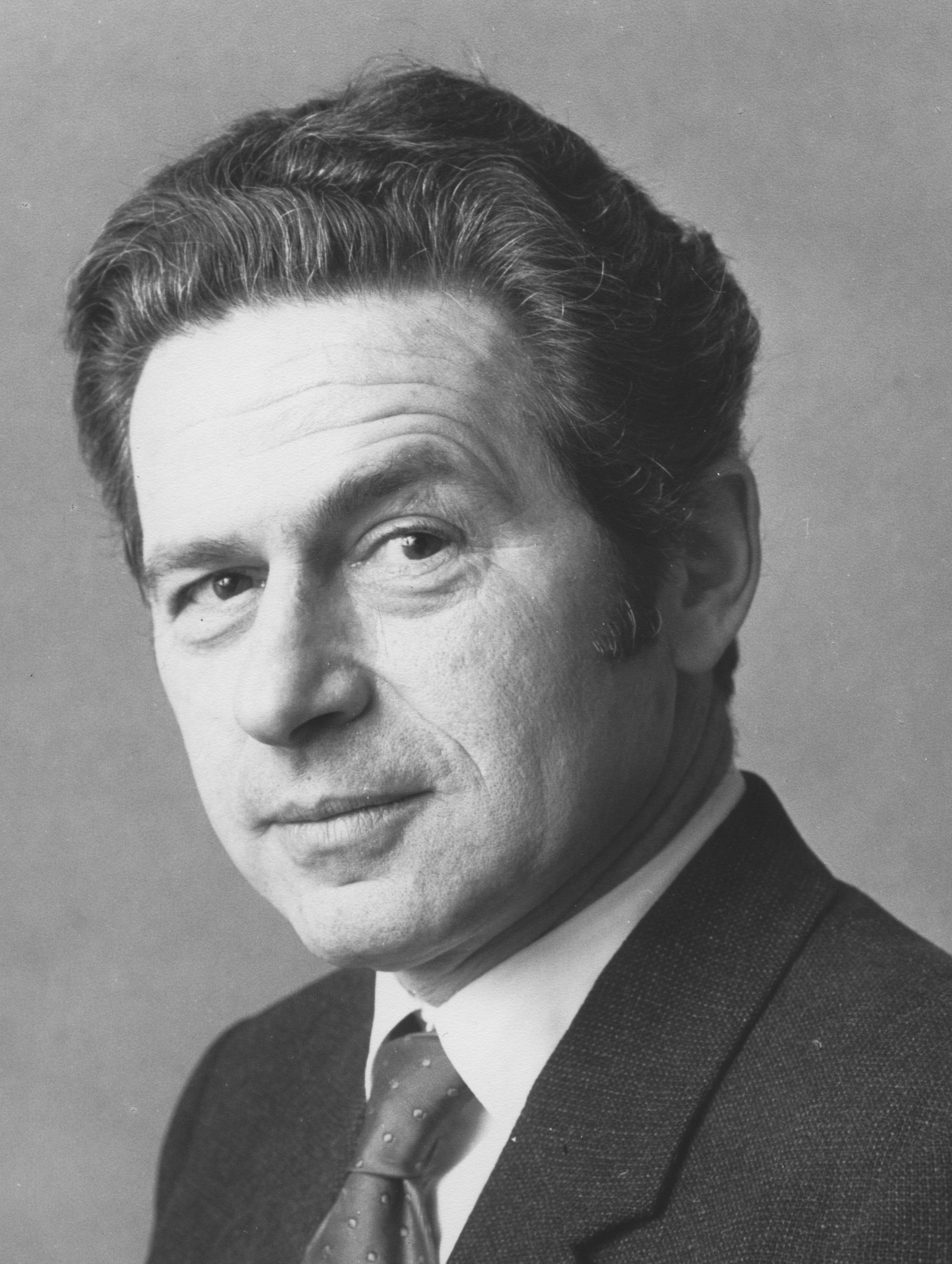
Letwin in 1977

William Letwin (14 December 1922 – 20 February 2013) was an American academic who ended his career as Professor of Political Science at the London School of Economics.

Letwin was born and raised in Milwaukee, Wisconsin, the son of Bessie (Rosenthal) and Lazar Letwin. His parents were Jewish emigrants from Mohyliv-Podilskyi, Ukraine. He was raised living above his father's shop, and gained entry to the University of Chicago under a plan to benefit the brightest students from poorer schools. He graduated BA in 1943, and joined the US Army, seeing Second World War active service in the Pacific as an intelligence officer on the staff of Douglas MacArthur. In 1944, while on leave, he married a fellow Chicago student, Shirley Robin Letwin (1924–1993). Leaving the U.S. Army in 1946, Letwin returned to Chicago as a graduate student, then in 1948 transferred to the London School of Economics for two years with the benefit of a Fulbright scholarship. Graduating PhD from Chicago in 1951, he was a post-doctoral fellow in the Economics Department at Chicago from 1951 to 1952, then a research associate in its law school, 1953–1955. He was then appointed as an assistant professor of industrial history at the Massachusetts Institute of Technology, and in 1960 became an associate professor of Economic History there. In 1966 he returned to the LSE as a reader in political science and was promoted to professor in 1977, going on to chair the political science department.

According to an obituary in The Times, Letwin "played a key role in promulgating the free-market economics of the Thatcher era".

As well as many works on economics, Letwin published a biography of the merchant and politician Sir Josiah Child. He was the father of the British politician Oliver Letwin.

== Selected publications ==
- Sir Josiah Child, Merchant Economist: With a Reprint of Brief Observations Concerning Trade, and Interest of Money (1668) (Cambridge, Mass: Baker Library, Harvard Graduate School of Business Administration, 1959)
- A Documentary History of American Economic Policy Since 1789 (Aldine, 1962)
- Law and Economic Policy in America: the Evolution of the Sherman Antitrust Act (University of Chicago Press, 1965, new edition 1981)
- On the Study of Public Policy (London School of Economics and Political Science, 1979)
- The Origins of Scientific Economics
- Against Equality: readings on economic and social policy (1983)
