= Robert Syms =

British Conservative politician

Sir Robert Syms
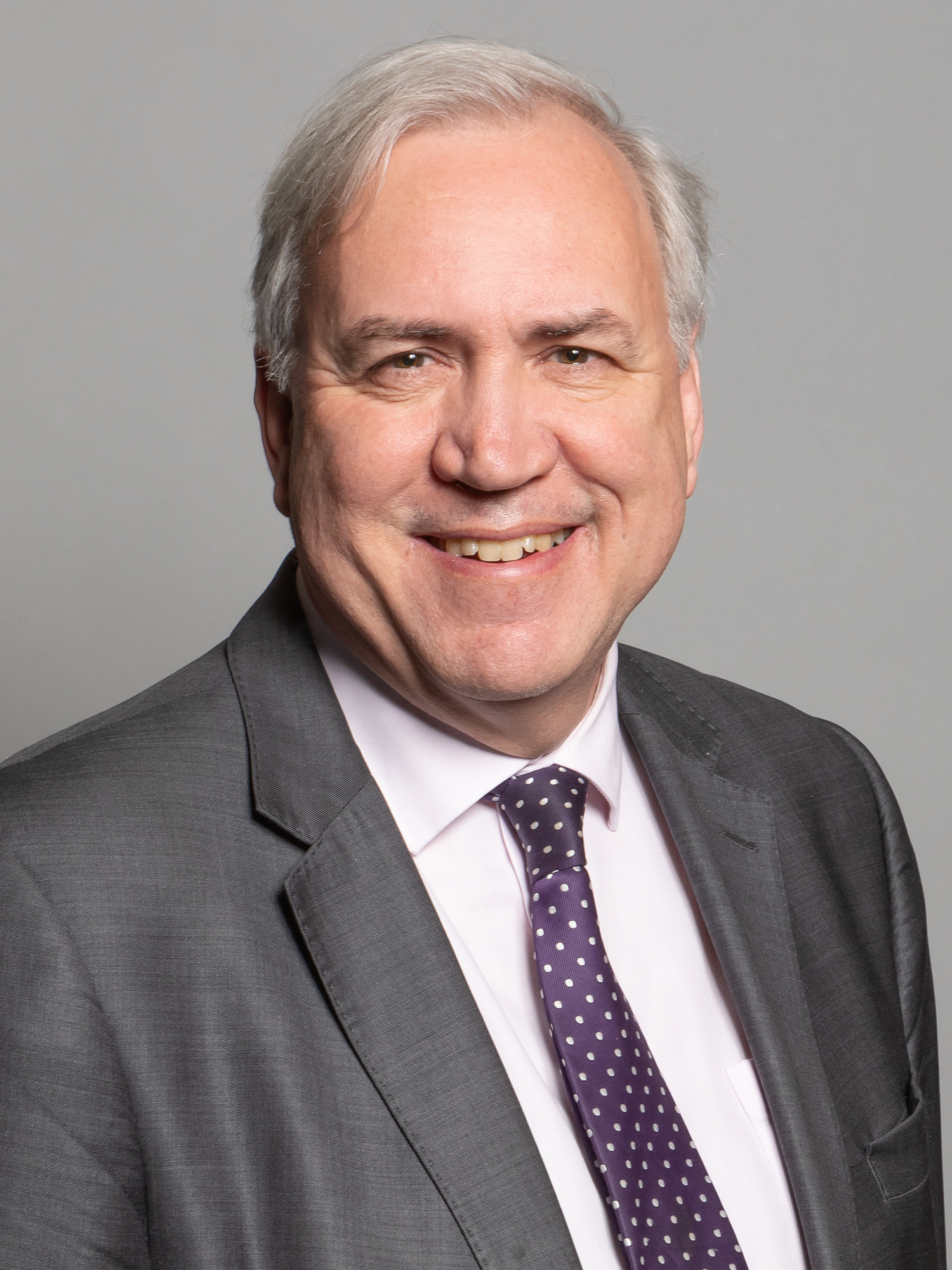

Lord Commissioner of the Treasury
- In office 17 July 2016 – 15 June 2017
- Prime Minister: Theresa May
- Preceded by: Charlie Elphicke
- Succeeded by: Mark Spencer

Member of Parliament for Poole
- In office 1 May 1997 – 30 May 2024
- Preceded by: John Devereux Ward
- Succeeded by: Neil Duncan-Jordan

Personal details
- Born: 15 August 1956 (age 70) Chippenham, Wiltshire, England
- Party: Conservative
- Spouses: Nicola Guy (m. 1991; div. 1999) Fiona Mellersh (m. 2000; div. 2016)
- Children: 2

Sir Robert Andrew Raymond Syms (born 15 August 1956) is a Conservative Party politician who was the Member of Parliament (MP) for Poole from 1997 to 2024. He received a knighthood in 2017.

== Early life and career ==
Robert Syms was born on 15 August 1956 in Chippenham, Wiltshire, and went to Collegiate School, a private school in Bristol.

He was leader of North Wiltshire District Council from 1984 to 1987 and a Wiltshire County Councillor from 1985 to 1997.

Syms has also been managing director of his family's plant hire firm on Bristol Road in Chippenham, and is a Fellow of the Chartered Institute of Building. He retains a directorship and shareholding in Marden Holdings Ltd, headquartered in Bristol Road, Chippenham.

== Parliamentary career ==
At the 1992 general election, Syms stood as the Conservative candidate in Walsall North, coming second with 39.4% of the vote behind the incumbent Labour MP David Winnick.

Syms was elected to Parliament as MP for Poole at the 1997 general election with 42.1% of the vote and a majority of 5,298. At the 2001 general election, Syms was re-elected as MP for Poole with an increased vote share of 45.1% and an increased majority of 7,166. He was again re-elected at the 2005 general election, with a decreased vote share of 43.4% and a decreased majority of 5,988.

In May 2009, The Daily Telegraph reported that Syms had claimed more than £2,000 of furniture for his designated second home in London which was delivered to his parents' address in Wiltshire. Syms denied any wrongdoing, telling the Bournemouth Echo: "It was purely a matter of convenience from my point of view". Syms said the furniture was only delivered and assembled at his parents' home, then later transported to his London address.

At the 2010 general election, Syms was again re-elected, with an increased vote share of 47.5% and an increased majority of 7,541.

Syms was an assistant whip for the Coalition government between 2012 and 2013. He has served on a variety of select committees, acting as chair of the Regulatory Reform Committee from July 2010 to September 2012 and the High Speed Rail select committee from April 2014 to February 2016.

At the 2015 general election, Syms was again re-elected with an increased vote share of 50.1% and an increased majority of 15,789.

Syms organised a letter signed by more than 80 fellow Eurosceptic Conservative MPs urging David Cameron to continue as Prime Minister regardless of the result of the EU referendum in 2016. He backed Theresa May's leadership bid following Cameron's resignation, and was appointed as a Government Whip and Lord Commissioner of HM Treasury upon May's succession.

At the snap 2017 general election, Syms was again re-elected, with an increased vote share of 57.9% and a decreased majority of 14,209.

At the 2019 general election, Syms was again re-elected, with an increased vote share of 58.7% and an increased majority of 19,116.

In 2020, Syms became a "lockdown rebel" and a steering committee member of the lockdown-sceptic COVID Recovery Group alongside a group of Conservative MPs who opposed the UK government's December 2020 lockdown.

At the 2024 general election, Syms lost his seat to Labour's Neil Duncan-Jordan by a margin of 18 votes. Syms's vote share was reduced to 31.8%. This was after multiple recounts.

== Personal life ==
He is divorced and has two children. Syms was appointed Knight Bachelor in October 2017.

Parliament of the United Kingdom
Preceded by John Ward	Member of Parliament for Poole; 1997–2024	Succeeded by Neil Duncan-Jordan
