= Sir Robert Williams, 1st Baronet, of Bridehead =

British politician (1848–1943)

The Right Honourable Sir Robert Williams PC JP
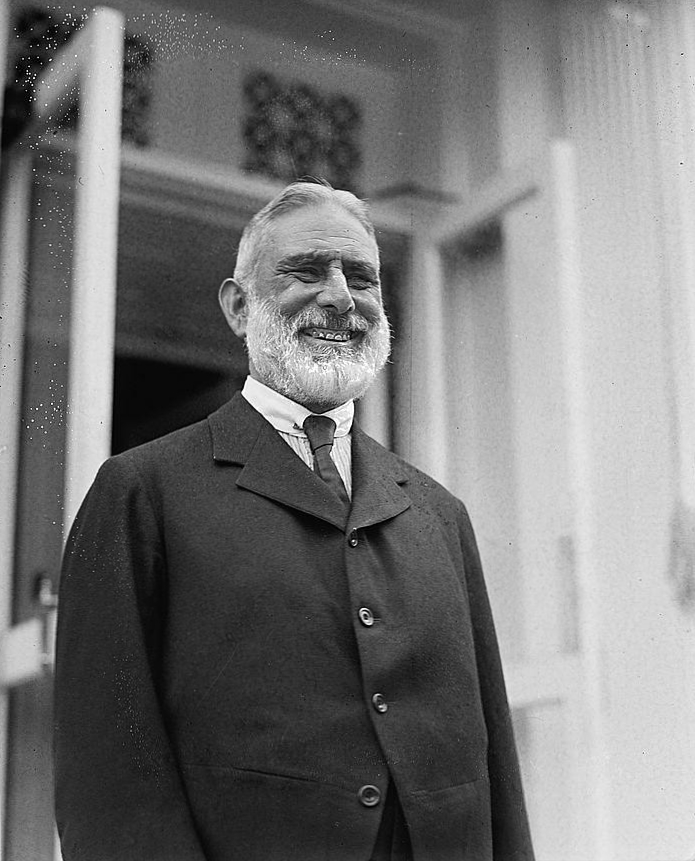

Member of Parliament for West Dorset
- In office 14 May 1895 – 15 November 1922
- Preceded by: Henry Richard Farquharson
- Succeeded by: Philip Colfox

Personal details
- Born: 15 June 1848
- Died: 15 April 1943 (aged 94)
- Party: Conservative
- Spouse: Rosa Walker Simes (1869–1916, her death)
- Children: 8

Sir Robert Williams, 1st Baronet JP (15 June 1848 – 15 April 1943) was a Conservative Party politician in the United Kingdom. He was elected as member of parliament (MP) for West Dorset at a by-election in May 1895, and held the seat until he stepped down from the House of Commons at the 1922 general election.

He was made a baronet, in 1915, of Bridehead in the county of Dorset.

Parliament of the United Kingdom
Preceded by Henry Richard Farquharson	Member of Parliament for West Dorset; 1895–1922	Succeeded by Philip Colfox
Baronetage of the United Kingdom
New creation	Baronet (of Bridehead); 1915–1943	Succeeded by Philip Williams
