= Shirley Robin Letwin =

American academic

Shirley Robin Letwin (née Shirley Robin; 17 February 1924 – 19 June 1993) was an American academic who lived in London.

== Biography ==
=== Early life ===
Shirley Robin Letwin was born in Chicago, Illinois. Her family were Jewish immigrants from Kiev. She graduated from the University of Chicago, where she was taught by Friedrich Hayek, and did graduate studies at the London School of Economics. She decided to move to England permanently in 1965.

=== Career ===
She taught at LSE and at Peterhouse, a college of the University of Cambridge, in the 1970s, a time when the college was a haunt of radical conservative thinkers focused loosely around Maurice Cowling. She wrote many books about conservatism, and one about Anthony Trollope.

She met Margaret Thatcher through her friend Keith Joseph, and started working for her. She also worked for the Centre for Policy Studies. She was also close to Michael Oakeshott and later became his literary executor. In 1987, she gave a lecture at the Centre for Independent Studies in Sydney, Australia.

=== Personal life ===
She was married to William Letwin. They had one son, Oliver Letwin. They lived in London, in a house overlooking Regent's Park. She was an avid tennis player, and once played with Milton Friedman despite the fact that it was snowing.

== Bibliography ==
- The Gentleman in Trollope: individuality and moral conduct (1982)
- On the History of the Idea of Law
- The Pursuit of Certainty: David Hume, Jeremy Bentham, John Stuart Mill and Beatrice Webb
- The Anatomy of Thatcherism (1992)
