= 1895 West Dorset by-election =

UK parliamentary by-election

- 14 May 1895

West Dorset constituency
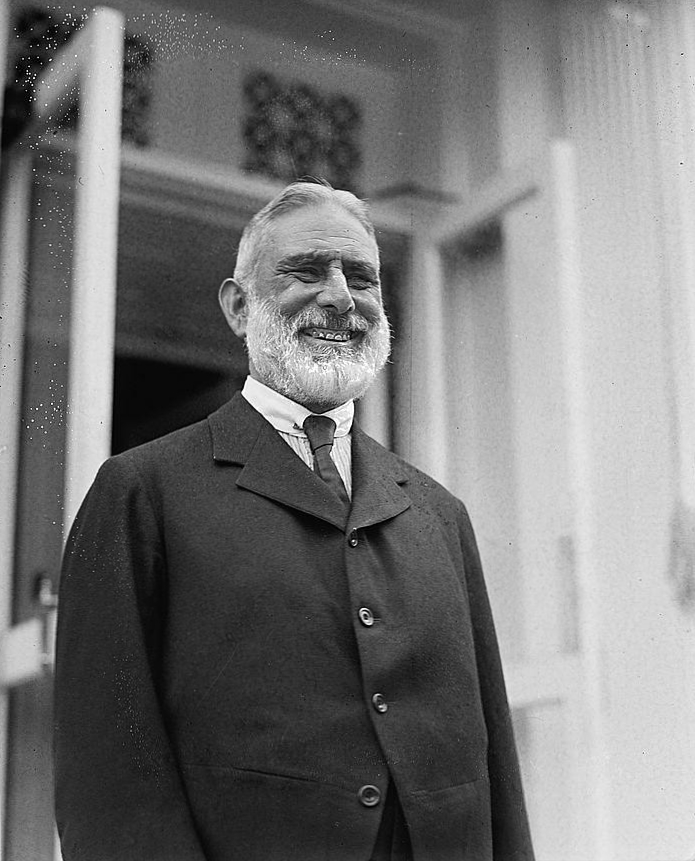
	First party	Second party
		Lib
Candidate	Robert Williams	G W Homer
Party	Conservative	Liberal
Popular vote	3,538	2,325
Percentage	60.3%	39.7%
Swing	▲3.6%	▼3.6%
MP before election
Henry Richard Farquharson
Conservative
Elected MP
Robert Williams
Conservative

The 1895 West Dorset by-election was held on 14 May 1895 after the death of the incumbent Conservative MP Henry Richard Farquharson. The seat was retained by the Conservative candidate Robert Williams.

1895 West Dorset by-election
Party	Candidate	Votes	%	±%
Conservative	Robert Williams	3,538	60.3	+3.6
Independent Farmers	George Wood Homer (Note: Supported by the local Liberal association)	2,325	39.7	−3.6
Majority		1,213	20.6	+7.1
Turnout		5,863	76.0	−8.0
Registered electors		7,713		
Conservative hold		Swing	+3.6	

== Notes and references ==
Notes
