= West Dorset (constituency) =

Parliamentary constituency in the United Kingdom, 1885 onwards

Coordinates: 50.7889°N 2.5980°W

- County constituency for the House of Commons
- Interactive map of boundaries since 2024
- Boundary of West Dorset in South West England
- County: Dorset
- Electorate: 75,390 (2023)
- Major settlements: Dorchester, Bridport and Sherborne

Current constituency
- Created: 1885
- Member of Parliament: Edward Morello (Liberal Democrats)
- Seats: One

West Dorset is a constituency (Note: A county constituency (for the purposes of election expenses and type of returning officer)) represented in the House of Commons of the UK Parliament since 2024 by Edward Morello, a Liberal Democrat. (Note: As with all constituencies, the constituency elects one Member of Parliament (MP) by the first past the post system of election at least every five years.)

== History ==
The seat was created under the Redistribution of Seats Act 1885.

Political history

Only Conservative MPs had been elected in West Dorset until the 2024 general election, when Edward Morello won the seat for the Liberal Democrats for the first time since its creation. Historically there had mostly been large majorities; thus the seat was considered a safe seat. The previous closest result in recent years was in 2001, when the then member, Oliver Letwin, held his seat with a majority of only 2.8% over the Liberal Democrat candidate, Simon Green. The second place in every election after 1970 has been taken by the Liberal Party and, subsequent to that party's merging with the SDP, the Liberal Democrats. Labour's best results in the constituency were in 1945 and 1966.

Prominent frontbenchers

Oliver Letwin, with a settled background in policy formulation, was appointed Minister of State for Policy (a Cabinet Office role) in the Conservative-Liberal Democrat Coalition on 12 May 2010. He had previously served as Shadow Chancellor of the Exchequer between 2003 and 2005.

== Boundaries ==
Map of boundaries 2010–2024

1885–1918: The Municipal Boroughs of Bridport and Lyme Regis, the Sessional Divisions of Bridport and Cerne, and part of the Sessional Divisions of Dorchester and Sherborne.

1918–1950: The Municipal Boroughs of Bridport, Dorchester, and Lyme Regis, the Rural Districts of Beaminster, Bridport, Cerne, and Dorchester, and part of the Rural District of Weymouth.

1950–1974: The Municipal Boroughs of Bridport, Dorchester, and Lyme Regis, the Urban District of Sherborne, the Rural Districts of Beaminster, Bridport, and Sherborne, and part of the Rural District of Dorchester.

1974–1983: As 1950 but with redrawn boundaries.

1983–2024: The District of West Dorset except the ward of Owermoigne.

2024–present: The District of Dorset wards of: Beaminster; Bridport; Chalk Valleys; Charminster St. Mary’s; Chesil Bank; Dorchester East; Dorchester Poundbury; Dorchester West; Eggardon; Lyme & Charmouth; Marshwood Vale; Sherborne East; Sherborne Rural; Sherborne West; Winterborne & Broadmayne; Yetminster.

Minor changes to bring the electorate within the permitted range following re-organisation of local authorities and wards in Dorset.

The West Dorset constituency includes the towns of Dorchester, the county town of Dorset; Bridport, Lyme Regis and Beaminster to the west; and Sherborne to the north.

== Constituency profile ==
Aside from tourist areas, including the Jurassic Coast which is a UNESCO World Heritage Site, the seat draws on managerial and advanced professional skills in sectors such as mechanical engineering, manufacturing, reconditioning, defence, art and design, which support local trades and retail. A slightly greater than average proportion of people are retired. Workless claimants who were registered jobseekers were in November 2012 significantly lower than the national average of 3.8%, at 1.4% of the population based on a statistical compilation by The Guardian.

== Members of Parliament ==
Election	Member	Party	Notes
1885	Henry Richard Farquharson	Conservative	Died 1895
1895 by-election	Robert Williams	Conservative	
1922	Philip Colfox	Conservative	Resigned 1941
1941 by-election	Simon Wingfield Digby	Conservative	
Feb 1974	James Spicer	Conservative	
1997	Oliver Letwin	Conservative	
2019	Oliver Letwin	Independent	Conservative whip removed in September 2019
2019	Chris Loder	Conservative	
2024	Edward Morello	Liberal Democrat	

== Elections ==
=== Elections in the 2020s ===
General election 2024: West Dorset
Party	Candidate	Votes	%	±%
Liberal Democrats	Edward Morello	26,999	51.3	+18.5
Conservative	Chris Loder	19,210	36.5	−17.8
Labour	Donna Lumsden	3,086	5.9	−3.5
Green	Kelvin Clayton	2,288	4.3	+0.8
Independent	Oliver Chisholm	733	1.4	New
Independent	Marcus White	289	0.5	New
Majority		7,789	14.8	N/A
Turnout		52,605	69.2	−7.5
Registered electors		75,998		
Liberal Democrats gain from Conservative		Swing	+18.1	

=== Elections in the 2010s ===
2019 notional result
Party	Vote	%
Conservative	31,375	54.3
Liberal Democrats	18,987	32.8
Labour	5,414	9.4
Green	2,037	3.5
Turnout	57,813	76.7
Electorate	75,390	

General election 2019: West Dorset
Party	Candidate	Votes	%	±%
Conservative	Chris Loder	33,589	55.1	−0.4
Liberal Democrats	Edward Morello	19,483	32.0	+8.5
Labour	Claudia Sorin	5,729	9.4	−8.9
Green	Kelvin Clayton	2,124	3.5	+0.8
Majority		14,106	23.1	−8.9
Turnout		60,925	74.7	−0.9
Conservative hold		Swing	−4.5	

General election 2017: West Dorset
Party	Candidate	Votes	%	±%
Conservative	Oliver Letwin	33,081	55.5	+5.3
Liberal Democrats	Andy Canning	13,990	23.5	+1.9
Labour	Lee Rhodes	10,896	18.3	+8.3
Green	Kelvin Clayton	1,631	2.7	−3.0
Majority		19,091	32.0	+2.4
Turnout		59,750	75.6	+3.0
Conservative hold		Swing	+1.7	

General election 2015: West Dorset
Party	Candidate	Votes	%	±%
Conservative	Oliver Letwin	28,329	50.2	+2.6
Liberal Democrats	Ros Kayes	12,199	21.6	−19.1
UKIP	David Glossop	7,055	12.5	+8.7
Labour	Rachel Rogers	5,633	10.0	+3.3
Green	Peter Barton	3,242	5.7	+4.5
Majority		16,130	28.6	+21.7
Turnout		56,643	72.6	−2.0
Conservative hold		Swing	+10.9	

General election 2010: West Dorset
Party	Candidate	Votes	%	±%
Conservative	Oliver Letwin	27,287	47.6	+1.1
Liberal Democrats	Sue Farrant	23,364	40.7	−1.2
Labour	Steve Bick	3,815	6.7	−1.0
UKIP	Oliver Chisholm	2,196	3.8	+1.8
Green	Susan Greene	675	1.2	−0.6
Majority		3,923	6.9	+2.3
Turnout		57,337	74.6	−1.7
Conservative hold		Swing	+1.1	

=== Elections in the 2000s ===
General election 2005: West Dorset
Party	Candidate	Votes	%	±%
Conservative	Oliver Letwin	24,763	46.5	+1.9
Liberal Democrats	Justine McGuinness	22,302	41.9	+0.1
Labour	Dave Roberts	4,124	7.7	−5.9
UKIP	Linda Guest	1,084	2.0	New
Green	Susan Greene	952	1.8	New
Majority		2,461	4.6	+1.8
Turnout		53,225	76.3	+6.8
Conservative hold		Swing	+0.9	

General election 2001: West Dorset
Party	Candidate	Votes	%	±%
Conservative	Oliver Letwin	22,126	44.6	+3.5
Liberal Democrats	Simon Green	20,712	41.8	+4.1
Labour	Richard Hyde	6,733	13.6	−4.1
Majority		1,414	2.8	−0.6
Turnout		49,571	69.5	−6.6
Conservative hold		Swing		

=== Elections in the 1990s ===
General election 1997: West Dorset
Party	Candidate	Votes	%	±%
Conservative	Oliver Letwin	22,036	41.1	−7.7
Liberal Democrats	Robin Legg	20,196	37.7	+1.5
Labour	Robert Bygraves	9,491	17.7	+4.7
UKIP	P. Jenkins	1,590	3.0	New
Natural Law	Mark Griffiths	239	0.4	New
Majority		1,840	3.4	−11.2
Turnout		53,552	76.1	−4.9
Conservative hold		Swing		

General election 1992: Dorset West
Party	Candidate	Votes	%	±%
Conservative	James Spicer	27,766	50.8	−5.4
Liberal Democrats	Robin Legg	19,756	36.2	+4.6
Labour	J Mann	7,082	13.0	+0.8
Majority		8,010	14.6	−10.0
Turnout		54,604	81.2	+2.9
Conservative hold		Swing	−4.9	

=== Elections in the 1980s ===
General election 1987: Dorset West
Party	Candidate	Votes	%	±%
Conservative	James Spicer	28,305	56.2	−3.5
Liberal	Trevor Jones	15,941	31.6	+2.7
Labour	John Watson	6,123	12.2	+0.8
Majority		12,364	24.6	−6.2
Turnout		50,369	78.3	+4.1
Conservative hold		Swing	−3.1	

General election 1983: Dorset West
Party	Candidate	Votes	%	±%
Conservative	James Spicer	27,030	59.7	+1.0
Liberal	Trevor Jones	13,078	28.9	+7.1
Labour	Derek Cash	5,168	11.4	−6.4
Majority		13,952	30.8	−6.1
Turnout		45,276	74.2	−4.8
Conservative hold		Swing	−3.0	

=== Elections in the 1970s ===
General election 1979: Dorset West
Party	Candidate	Votes	%	±%
Conservative	James Spicer	26,281	58.71	
Liberal	Trevor Jones	9,776	21.84	
Labour	HJ Skevington	7,999	17.87	
National Front	J Tillotson	514	1.15	New
Wessex Regionalists	G McEwan	192	0.43	New
Majority		16,505	36.87	
Turnout		44,762	79.00	
Conservative hold		Swing		

General election October 1974: Dorset West
Party	Candidate	Votes	%	±%
Conservative	James Spicer	20,517	49.20	
Liberal	RM Angus	11,832	28.37	
Labour	PJ Dawe	9,350	22.42	
Majority		8,685	20.83	
Turnout		41,699	77.84	
Conservative hold		Swing		

General election February 1974: Dorset West
Party	Candidate	Votes	%	±%
Conservative	James Spicer	21,634	49.00	
Liberal	RM Angus	14,183	32.12	
Labour	MF Cross	8,333	18.87	
Majority		7,451	16.88	
Turnout		44,150	83.12	
Conservative hold		Swing		

General election 1970: Dorset West
Party	Candidate	Votes	%	±%
Conservative	Simon Wingfield Digby	21,081	54.15	
Labour	George Sakwa	10,536	27.06	
Liberal	Allan Percival	7,314	18.79	
Majority		10,545	27.09	
Turnout		38,931	76.76	
Conservative hold		Swing		

=== Elections in the 1960s ===
General election 1966: Dorset West
Party	Candidate	Votes	%	±%
Conservative	Simon Wingfield Digby	17,709	47.68	
Labour	F Donald Shirreff	11,757	31.65	
Liberal	Michael Aza Pinney	7,676	20.67	
Majority		5,952	16.03	
Turnout		37,142	80.85	
Conservative hold		Swing		

General election 1964: Dorset West
Party	Candidate	Votes	%	±%
Conservative	Simon Wingfield Digby	17,841	48.59	
Labour	Leslie William King	10,631	28.96	
Liberal	Michael Aza Pinney	8,242	22.45	
Majority		7,210	19.63	
Turnout		36,714	81.68	
Conservative hold		Swing		

=== Elections in the 1950s ===
General election 1959: Dorset West
Party	Candidate	Votes	%	±%
Conservative	Simon Wingfield Digby	19,747	54.65	
Labour	Leslie William King	11,536	31.93	
Liberal	John H. Goodden	4,850	13.42	New
Majority		8,211	22.72	
Turnout		36,133	81.92	
Conservative hold		Swing		

General election 1955: Dorset West
Party	Candidate	Votes	%	±%
Conservative	Simon Wingfield Digby	21,007	59.59	
Labour	Leslie William King	14,244	40.41	
Majority		6,763	19.18	
Turnout		35,251	80.07	
Conservative hold		Swing		

General election 1951: Dorset West
Party	Candidate	Votes	%	±%
Conservative	Simon Wingfield Digby	21,739	60.31	
Labour	Cambreth John Kane	14,308	39.69	
Majority		7,431	20.62	
Turnout		36,047	82.11	
Conservative hold		Swing		

General election 1950: Dorset West
Party	Candidate	Votes	%	±%
Conservative	Simon Wingfield Digby	18,771	51.75	
Labour	Cambreth John Kane	11,967	33.00	
Liberal	Colin Grant Cameron	5,531	15.25	
Majority		6,804	18.75	
Turnout		36,269	83.95	
Conservative hold		Swing		

=== Elections in the 1940s ===
General election 1945: West Dorset
Party	Candidate	Votes	%	±%
Conservative	Simon Wingfield Digby	13,399	50.1	−4.0
Labour	Cambreth John Kane	8,215	30.8	New
Liberal	George Newsom	5,098	19.1	−26.8
Majority		5,184	19.3	+9.1
Turnout		26,712	74.7	−3.2
Conservative hold		Swing		

1941 West Dorset by-election
Party	Candidate	Votes	%	±%
Conservative	Simon Wingfield Digby	Unopposed	N/A	N/A
Conservative hold				

General Election 1939–40:

Another general election was required to take place before the end of 1940. The political parties had been making preparations for an election to take place from 1939, and by the end of this year the following candidates had been selected:

- Conservative: Simon Wingfield Digby
- Liberal: George Edwin Chappell
- British Union: Ralph Jebb

=== Elections in the 1930s ===
General election 1935: West Dorset
Party	Candidate	Votes	%	±%
Conservative	Philip Colfox	13,825	54.1	−6.1
Liberal	George Edwin Chappell	11,735	45.9	+6.1
Majority		2,090	8.2	−12.2
Turnout		25,560	77.9	−3.7
Conservative hold		Swing	−6.1	

General election 1931: West Dorset
Party	Candidate	Votes	%	±%
Conservative	Philip Colfox	15,510	60.2	+11.1
Liberal	George Edwin Chappell	10,271	39.8	+8.0
Majority		5,239	20.4	+3.1
Turnout		25,781	81.6	+1.0
Conservative hold		Swing		

=== Elections in the 1920s ===
General election 1929: Dorset West
Party	Candidate	Votes	%	±%
Unionist	Philip Colfox	12,247	49.1	−19.2
Liberal	George Edwin Chappell	7,921	31.8	New
Labour	Thomas Robins	4,770	19.1	−12.6
Majority		4,326	17.3	−19.3
Turnout		24,938	80.6	+7.4
Unionist hold		Swing		

General election 1924: West Dorset
Party	Candidate	Votes	%	±%
Unionist	Philip Colfox	12,426	68.3	+9.5
Labour	Louie Simpson	5,764	31.7	−9.5
Majority		6,662	36.6	+19.0
Turnout		18,190	73.2	+2.3
Unionist hold		Swing	+9.5	

General election 1923: West Dorset
Party	Candidate	Votes	%	±%
Unionist	Philip Colfox	10,100	58.8	−3.3
Labour	Louie Simpson	7,087	41.2	+3.3
Majority		3,013	17.6	−6.6
Turnout		17,187	70.9	−7.6
Unionist hold		Swing	−3.3	

General election 1922: West Dorset
Party	Candidate	Votes	%	±%
Unionist	Philip Colfox	11,649	62.1	N/A
Labour	T C Duke	7,101	37.9	New
Majority		4,548	24.2	N/A
Turnout		18,750	78.5	N/A
Unionist hold		Swing		

=== Elections in the 1910s ===
General election 1918: West Dorset
Party		Candidate	Votes	%	±%
C	Unionist	Robert Williams	Unopposed		
	Unionist hold				
C indicates candidate endorsed by the coalition government.

General Election 1914–15:

Another General Election was required to take place before the end of 1915. The political parties had been making preparations for an election to take place and by July 1914, the following candidates had been selected:

- Unionist: Robert Williams
- Liberal:

General election December 1910: Dorset West
Party	Candidate	Votes	%	±%
Conservative	Robert Williams	Unopposed		
Conservative hold				

General election January 1910: Dorset West
Party	Candidate	Votes	%	±%
Conservative	Robert Williams	4,011	59.2	+2.8
Liberal	William Saunders Edwards	2,759	40.8	−2.8
Majority		1,252	18.4	+5.6
Turnout		6,770	89.4	+1.6
Registered electors		7,576		
Conservative hold		Swing	+2.8	

=== Elections in the 1900s ===
General election 1906: Dorset West
Party	Candidate	Votes	%	±%
Conservative	Robert Williams	3,671	56.4	N/A
Liberal	Johnstone J Haye	2,834	43.6	New
Majority		837	12.8	N/A
Turnout		6,505	87.8	N/A
Registered electors		7,413		
Conservative hold		Swing	N/A	

General election 1900: Dorset West
Party	Candidate	Votes	%	±%
Conservative	Robert Williams	Unopposed		
Conservative hold				

=== Elections in the 1890s ===
General election 1895: Dorset West
Party	Candidate	Votes	%	±%
Conservative	Robert Williams	Unopposed		
Conservative hold				

1895 West Dorset by-election
Party	Candidate	Votes	%	±%
Conservative	Robert Williams	3,538	60.3	+3.6
Independent Farmers	George Wood Homer (Note: Supported by the local Liberal association)	2,325	39.7	−3.6
Majority		1,213	20.6	+7.2
Turnout		5,863	76.0	−8.0
Registered electors		7,713		
Conservative hold		Swing	+3.6	

General election 1892: Dorset West
Party	Candidate	Votes	%	±%
Conservative	Henry Farquharson	3,691	56.7	−3.1
Liberal	Charles Tindal Gatty	2,813	43.3	+3.1
Majority		878	13.4	−6.2
Turnout		6,504	84.0	+6.4
Registered electors		7,747		
Conservative hold		Swing	−3.1	

=== Elections in the 1880s ===
General election 1886: Dorset West
Party	Candidate	Votes	%	±%
Conservative	Henry Farquharson	3,672	59.8	+8.8
Liberal	Herbert Carey George Batten	2,467	40.2	−8.8
Majority		1,205	19.6	+17.6
Turnout		6,139	77.6	−9.2
Registered electors		7,914		
Conservative hold		Swing	+8.8	

General election 1885: Dorset West
Party	Candidate	Votes	%	±%
Conservative	Henry Farquharson	3,507	51.0	
Liberal	Herbert Carey George Batten	3,366	49.0	
Majority		141	2.0	
Turnout		6,873	86.8	
Registered electors		7,914		
Conservative win (new seat)				

== See also ==
- Parliamentary constituencies in Dorset
