= Simon Wingfield Digby =

British politician (1910–1998)

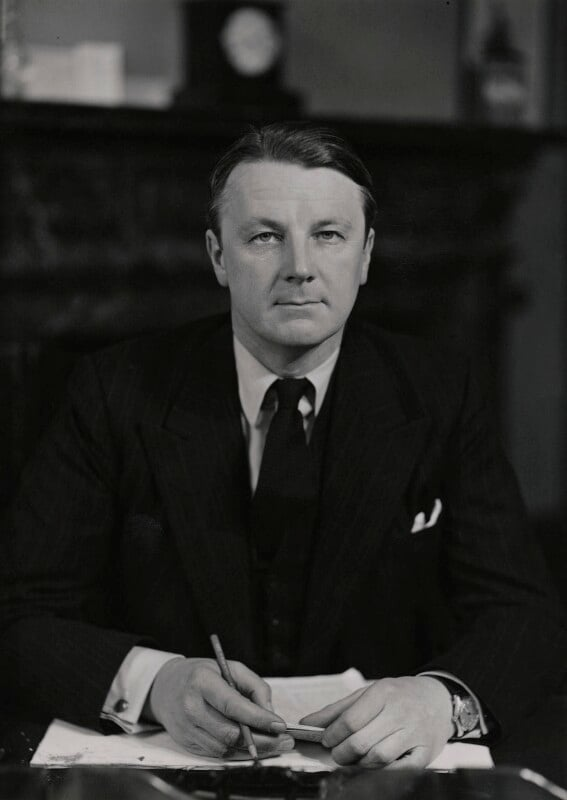
- Digby in 1952

Member of Parliament for West Dorset
- In office 21 June 1941 – 8 February 1974
- Preceded by: Philip Colfox
- Succeeded by: James Spicer

Personal details
- Born: Kenelm Simon Digby Wingfield Digby; 13 February 1910 Sherborne, Dorset, England
- Died: 22 March 1998 (aged 88) Gillingham, Dorset, England
- Party: Conservative
- Spouse: Kathleen Kingstone (m. 1936)
- Children: 2
- Education: Harrow School; Trinity College, Cambridge

Kenelm Simon Digby Wingfield Digby (13 February 1910 – 22 March 1998) was a British Conservative politician.

Digby was educated at Harrow School and Trinity College, Cambridge. He was elected as member of parliament (MP) for West Dorset at a by-election in June 1941, and held the seat for over 32 years until his retirement at the February 1974 general election.

Parliament of the United Kingdom
Preceded by Sir William Philip Colfox, Bt	Member of Parliament for West Dorset; 1941 – February 1974	Succeeded by Sir James Spicer
