= Nicholas Colfox =

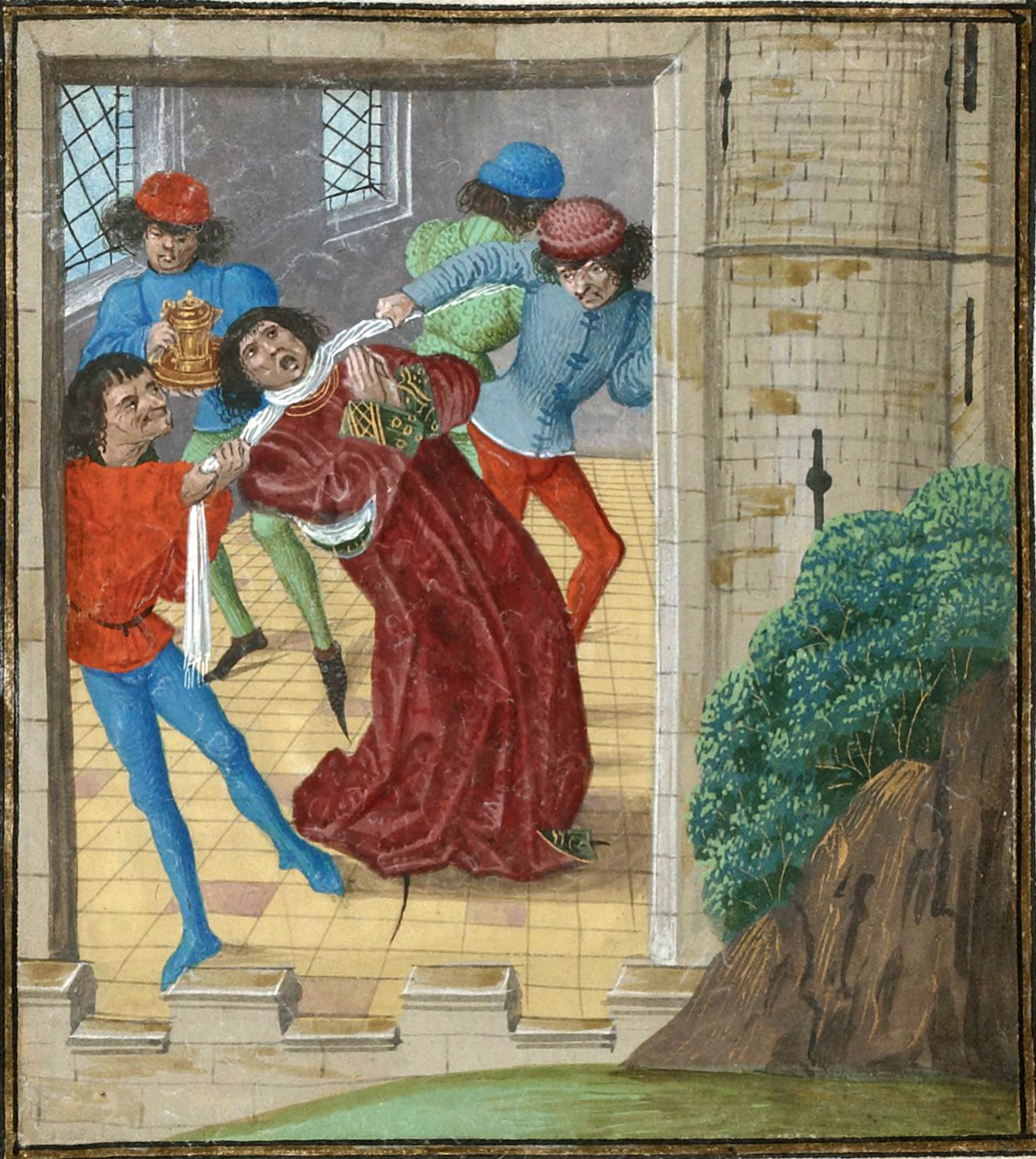
The murder of Thomas of Woodstock in Calais by Colfox's gang, from Froissart's Chroniques.

Sir Nicholas Colfox (flourished 1400) was a medieval English knight who in 1397 was involved in the murder of Thomas of Woodstock, 1st Duke of Gloucester, uncle of King Richard II, apparently on the orders of the king. Colfox's involvement in the killing may have been alluded to in Geoffrey Chaucer's Nun's Priest's Tale, in which a duplicitous fox is referred to as a "Colfox" and described as "liking to murder men".

== Origins ==
Nicholas Colfox appears to have come from Nantwich in Cheshire where he owned several salt furnaces and accompanying shares in the salt springs. He also held property at Barton Seagrave in Northamptonshire from Thomas Mowbray, part of the latter's inheritance as Earl of Norfolk.

A close ally of Richard II, Mowbray was later exiled. During Mowbray's exile, Barton Seagrave Castle was held by Richard Colfox, possibly Nicholas's son. The Colfoxes were well connected, educated Lollard Knights, deriving their wealth from the luxury trades of salt and wool and obtaining their name from the trade in black fox fur which underwrote the re-circulation of trade cash from the Far East during the Middle Ages

== Murder ==
Colfox murdered the Duke of Gloucester in Calais. He was probably instructed personally by Thomas Mowbray, then Governor of Calais, in whose charge Gloucester was held after his recent arrest on the King's order. According to the 1399 confession of Mowbray's valet, John Hall, he was told by Colfox to help to get the Duke away from his usual lodging. Hall helped to move Gloucester to a different house where Colfox and others were waiting. They then strangled the Duke.

=== Consequences ===
The rewards for the murder of Thomas of Woodstock were substantial. Six months after the overthrow of the other Lords Appellant with the murder of Thomas of Woodstock and execution of the Earl of Arundel, Thomas Mowbray was made first Duke of Norfolk and the first Hereditary Earl Marshall. Mowbray's grandmother, the Countess of Norfolk was made Duchess. John of Gaunt's son Henry Bolingbroke, Earl of Derby was made Duke of Hereford.

After the overthrow of Richard and the death of Mowbray, the killers of Woodstock were arrested. Hall was executed following his confession implicating the others. Another assassin, William Serle, was also executed after extreme torture. But Colfox was pardoned shortly after their deaths for reasons unknown. The following year he was also pardoned for all other "treasons, insurrections, rebellions and felonies". He subsequently appears in records only for minor matters, including debt and tax assessment of his property in Gloucester.

== Chaucer's Riddle ==
Chaucer's poem is a fable of a fox and a cockerel in which the sly fox first catches the cockerel by appealing to his vanity, but is finally outwitted by the bird who escapes. The fox is described in the following lines:

A col-fox, ful of sly iniquitee...
As gladly doon thise homicydes alle,
That in awayt liggen to mordre men.
O false mordrer, lurking in thy den!

Shakespearean scholar J Leslie Hotson (1897–1992) published Nicholas Colfox's story in PMLA XXXIX 1924, explaining Chaucer's use of his unusual name, not appearing elsewhere in English literature. He traced Nicholas's Parliamentary denouncement, the petition by the then knighted Sir Nicholas Colfox and his subsequent pardon in 1404 (available online from the British Library).

Hotson's thesis, entitled Colfox vs Chauntecleer, is that Chaucer's Nun's Priest's Tale is an allegory for the murder of Thomas of Woodstock by Nicholas Colfox and a coded accusation against both Colfox's employer, Thomas Mowbray and the latter's rival, Henry Bolingbroke. According to Hotson, Chauntecleer - the cockerel in the allegory - is described in colours unknown to any breed of cockerel but which coincide with Bolingbroke's coat of arms, as worn at his famous trial by combat against Mowbray. Scholars have criticised Hotson's theory by suggesting that Chauntecleer's colours are in fact similar to those of the Golden Spangled Hamburg cockerel, though Hamburgs do not have a black beak. Modern critics do not all reject Hotson's allegory theory, but believe that Chaucer's long version of the fable is written on many different levels of meaning.
