= Oliver Letwin =

British politician (born 1956)

The Right Honourable Sir Oliver Letwin FRSA PC
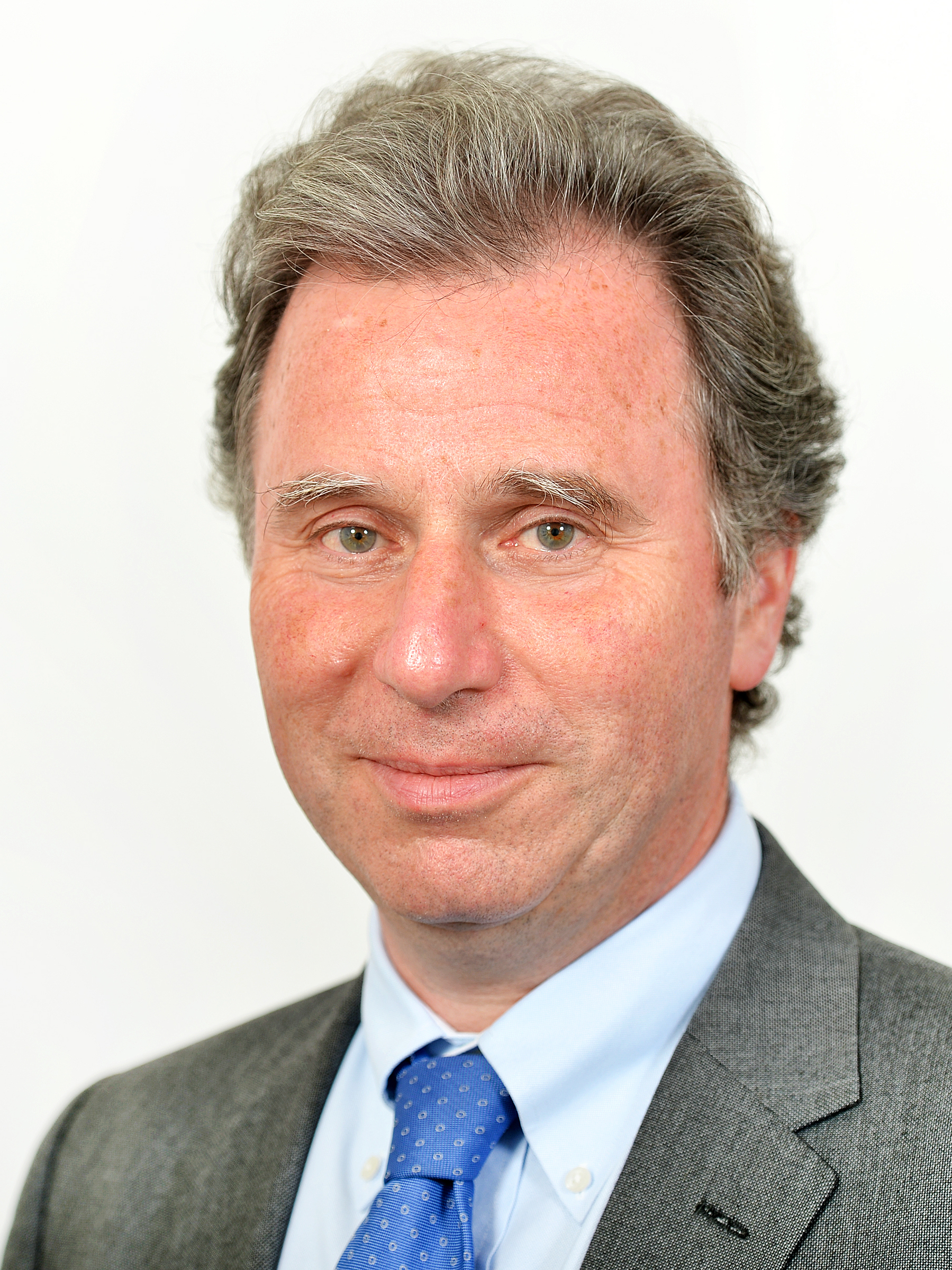
- Official portrait, 2015

Chancellor of the Duchy of Lancaster
- In office 15 July 2014 – 14 July 2016
- Prime Minister: David Cameron
- Preceded by: The Lord Hill of Oareford
- Succeeded by: Patrick McLoughlin

Minister of State for Government Policy
- In office 12 May 2010 – 14 July 2016
- Prime Minister: David Cameron
- Preceded by: Office established
- Succeeded by: Office abolished
Shadow portfolios
2000–2001	Chief Secretary to the Treasury
2001–2003	Home Department
2003–2005	Chancellor of the Exchequer
2005	Environment, Food and Rural Affairs

Member of Parliament for West Dorset
- In office 1 May 1997 – 6 November 2019
- Preceded by: James Spicer
- Succeeded by: Chris Loder

Personal details
- Born: 19 May 1956 (age 70) London, England
- Party: Conservative
- Spouse: Isabel Davidson (m. 1984)
- Children: 2
- Education: Eton College
- Alma mater: Trinity College, Cambridge; London Business School

Academic background
- Thesis: Emotion and emotions (1982)

Sir Oliver Letwin (born 19 May 1956) is a British politician, Member of Parliament (MP) for West Dorset from 1997 to 2019. Letwin was elected as a member of the Conservative Party, but sat as an independent after having the whip removed in September 2019. He was Shadow Chancellor of the Exchequer under Michael Howard and Shadow Home Secretary under Iain Duncan Smith. He was Chancellor of the Duchy of Lancaster from 2014 to 2016.

Following the 2015 general election Letwin was given overall responsibility for the Cabinet Office and became a full member of the Cabinet in the Conservative government. Previously he had been the Minister of State for Government Policy from 2010.

During the Second May ministry in 2019, Letwin rebelled against leading Eurosceptics within the Conservative Party by tabling a cross-party motion to hold "indicative votes", allowing MPs to vote on several Brexit options in order to establish whether any could command a majority in the House of Commons; it transpired that none of them could. Letwin sought to extend Article 50 through passing the Cooper–Letwin Act. In August 2019 he announced that he would stand down at the next election. On 3 September 2019, he lost the Conservative party whip and sat as an independent MP after that.

== Early life and education ==
Letwin, who was born 19 May 1956 in London, is the son of William Letwin (14 December 1922 – 20 February 2013), emeritus professor at the London School of Economics, and the conservative academic Shirley Robin Letwin. His parents were "Jewish-American intellectuals from Chicago whose parents had fled persecution in Kiev."

He was educated at The Hall School, Hampstead and at Eton College. He then went to Trinity College, Cambridge, where he received a double first in history. From 1980 to 1981, Letwin was a visiting fellow (a Procter Fellow) of Princeton University, then a research fellow of Darwin College, Cambridge, from 1981 until 1982. His thesis, Emotion and Emotions, earned a PhD awarded by the Cambridge Philosophy Faculty in 1982. He is also a graduate of the London Business School.

== Political career ==
He was a member of Prime Minister Margaret Thatcher's Policy Unit from 1983 to 1986.

According to official government documents from 1985, released in December 2014 under the thirty-year rule, Letwin recommended that the Prime Minister "use Scotland as a trail-blazer for the pure residence charge", i.e. the controversial Community Charge or "Poll tax", having trialled it there first, and to implement it nationwide should "the exemplifications prove ... it is feasible."

Another 1985 internal memo released in December 2015 showed Letwin's response to the Broadwater Farm riot, which blamed the violence on the "bad moral attitudes" of the predominantly Afro-Caribbean rioters, claiming that "lower-class, unemployed white people lived for years without a breakdown of public order on anything like the present scale". It also criticised some of the schemes proposed to address inner-city problems, suggesting David Young's proposed scheme to support black entrepreneurs would flounder because the money would be spent on the "disco and drug trade". Letwin later apologised, saying that parts of the memo had been "both badly worded and wrong."

Letwin co-authored Britain's biggest enterprise: ideas for radical reform of the NHS, a 1988 Centre for Policy Studies pamphlet written with John Redwood which advocated a closer relationship between the National Health Service and the private sector. This is regarded as providing a theoretical justification for NHS reforms carried out by subsequent governments, particularly the Health and Social Care Act 2012.

Letwin stood unsuccessfully against Diane Abbott in Hackney North and Stoke Newington at the 1987 election, and against Glenda Jackson for the Hampstead and Highgate seat at the 1992 election.

=== MP for West Dorset (1997–2019) ===
Letwin won the historically safe Conservative seat of West Dorset at the 1997 general election, achieving a majority of 1,840 votes over the next candidate.

==== Shadow Cabinet (2000–2010) ====
As Leader of the Opposition and Leader of the Conservative Party William Hague appointed Letwin as a member of his Shadow Cabinet as Shadow Chief Secretary to the Treasury in September 2000. He supported Michael Portillo and Michael Howard in their consecutive tenures as Shadow Chancellor of the Exchequer.

He had previously been an official Opposition spokesman on Constitutional Affairs, Scotland and Wales from 1998, and was promoted to Shadow Financial Secretary to the Treasury in 1999.

During the campaign for the 2001 general election, Letwin expressed an aspiration to curtail future public spending by £20 billion per annum relative to the plans of the Labour government. When this proposal came under attack as regressive, Letwin found few of his colleagues to defend it, and he adopted a low profile for the remainder of the campaign. He went into hiding during the 2001 election. At this election, his majority in his West Dorset constituency was cut to 1,414 votes.

In September 2001, he was appointed Shadow Home Secretary by the new Conservative Party leader Iain Duncan Smith. In this role, he attracted plaudits for his advocacy of a "neighbourly society", which manifested itself in calls for street by street neighbourhood policing, modelled on the philosophy of the police in New York. He was also largely credited with forcing the then Home Secretary to withdraw his proposal in 2001 to introduce an offence of incitement to religious hatred. He successfully argued that such an offence would be impossible to define, so there would be little chance of prosecution. He also argued that Muslims would feel persecuted by such a law. In late 2003, Michael Howard appointed Letwin as his successor as Shadow Chancellor of the Exchequer. As Shadow Chancellor he focused on reducing waste in the public sector.

At the 2005 general election the Conservative Party claimed to have found £35 billion worth of potential savings, to be used for increased resources for front-line services and for tax cuts. This approach was credited with forcing the government to introduce bureaucracy reduction and cost-cutting proposals of their own. In May 2005, Letwin's majority in his seat increased to 2,461 votes, despite his hard pro-EU views. After the election, Letwin was appointed Shadow Secretary of State for the Environment, Food and Rural Affairs. The Times reported that he had requested a role less onerous than his former Treasury brief so that he would have time to pursue his career in the City. Until December 2009, he was a non-executive director of the merchant bank NM Rothschild Corporate Finance Ltd.

Following Michael Howard's decision to stand down as Conservative Party leader after the 2005 election, Letwin publicly backed the youngest candidate and eventual winner David Cameron.

In the lead-up to the 2010 general election, Letwin played an important role in the development of Conservative policy, and was described by Daniel Finkelstein as "the Gandalf of the process". The 2010 general election saw him increase his majority to 3,923 votes.

==== Cameron premiership (2010–2016) ====
British Prime Minister David Cameron appointed Letwin to the newly created office of Minister of State for Government Policy in the newly formed Conservative-Liberal Democrat Coalition government in May 2010. His responsibilities included developing government policies with the Cabinet Office, as set out in the Coalition's programme for government, as well as implementing departmental business plans. He also attended the Cabinet, although not as a full member or Cabinet Minister.

Letwin was appointed as Chancellor of the Duchy of Lancaster on 14 July 2014, succeeding Lord Hill of Oareford who became the United Kingdom's next European commissioner. He also continued in his role as Minister for Policy until the 2015 general election, when the position was abolished.

He was returned with a much increased majority of 16,130 votes by his West Dorset constituents at the 2015 general election. Following that election, Letwin remained Chancellor of the Duchy of Lancaster and Cameron also appointed him as a full member of the new Conservative government's Cabinet with responsibility for overall charge and oversight of the Cabinet Office.

Immediately following the 23 June 2016 United Kingdom European Union membership referendum, Cameron appointed Letwin "Minister for Brexit". He appeared on 5 July before the Foreign Affairs Select Committee and was criticised for Government's lack of planning for a leave vote. The Cabinet was accused of "dereliction of duty". When committee chairman Crispin Blunt observed, upon the resignation of Cameron, that Letwin had been left "holding the baby", Letwin said, "I can only say that the baby is being firmly held, and that my intention is that the baby should prosper – because I care about the baby in question. It is, in fact, our country."

Letwin was awarded a knighthood by David Cameron in the 2016 Prime Minister's Resignation Honours List. This gave him the honorific title "Sir" for life.

==== May premiership (2016–2019) ====
The new Prime Minister Theresa May terminated Letwin's tenure as the Chancellor of the Duchy of Lancaster and split the Minister for Brexit position he had held, creating the Secretary of State for Exiting the European Union and handing that job to arch-Leaver David Davis.

In 2018, Letwin led an "independent review" into the delivery of housing on large development sites.

During the Second May ministry in 2019, Letwin rebelled against leading Eurosceptics within the Conservative Party by tabling a cross-party motion to hold "indicative votes", allowing MPs to vote on several Brexit options in order to establish whether any could command a majority in the House of Commons. Though no option received a positive number of votes, the "People's Vote" proposal from Margaret Beckett was the most popular.

==== Expulsion from the Conservative Party ====
In August 2019, Letwin announced that he would stand down at the next general election. On 3 September 2019 he proposed the Letwin motion upon the Benn bill under Standing Order No. 24, and then, with 20 other rebel Conservative MPs, voted against the Conservative government of Boris Johnson. The rebel MPs voted for the Letwin motion to take control of parliamentary business from the government, for the purpose of introducing a bill which would prevent the Prime Minister's policy of allowing the United Kingdom to leave the EU without a deal on 31 October. The bill thus introduced the next day became the European Union (Withdrawal) (No. 2) Act 2019. Subsequently, all 21 were advised that they had lost the Conservative whip, expelling them as Conservative MPs and requiring them to sit as independents. If Letwin had decided to stand for re-election in a future election the party would have blocked him as a Conservative candidate, but that was immaterial for him, as he had already promised in August to stand down.

==== As an independent MP ====
After his summary ejection from the Conservative parliamentary party, Letwin sat as an independent. On 19 October 2019, he tabled an amendment to the Government business of the 'super Saturday' session. His amendment passed by 322 to 306 votes. The government then deferred the vote it had planned for that day on the actual deal itself. His amendment attracted the support of ten former Conservative and ten Democratic Unionist Party members, while the government attracted the votes of six Labour MPs and seventeen independents. Eight Labour MPs, five Conservatives and one independent member did not vote on the Letwin motion. The following day, The Sunday Telegraph published a declaration from an anonymous Conservative source that Letwin's motion had been masterminded by Lord Pannick, the barrister who had represented Gina Miller in her actions against the Johnson ministry's Brexit policy.

After announcing that he would not stand in the 2019 general election, Letwin was succeeded as the Conservative candidate for Dorset West by Chris Loder, who was subsequently elected as the seat's MP.

== Public sector spending ==
Letwin maintained in June 2017 that the public is willing to increase taxes carefully for large numbers of people to pay for improved public services. Letwin said, "It may well be, in one way or another, a large number of people will have to pay a little more tax if we are going to maintain the trend towards reduced deficits and yet spend a little more on the crucial public services that do need more spent on them". Letwin wants to see better public services rather than higher public sector pay. Letwin believes reducing the deficit is important so Britain is protected when the next downturn comes.

== Controversies ==
=== 1985 Broadwater Farm memo controversy ===
In 1985, Letwin and Hartley Booth wrote a five-page document as members of then-Prime Minister Thatcher's policy unit in response to the widespread 1985 unrest in Britain's inner cities – with riots in Broadwater Farm estates in Tottenham, North London, Handsworth, Brixton, Peckham and Toxteth. In the paper, Letwin and Booth urged "Thatcher to ignore reports that rioting in mainly black urban areas was the result of social deprivation and racism." Letwin was at the time considered to be a "young star" of the Conservative Party. The memo scorned suggestions by senior cabinet ministers to set up a £10 million communities programme to tackle inner-city problems by helping black entrepreneurs start businesses as suggested by then-Employment Secretary David Young, refurbishing public housing council blocks as suggested by then-Environment Secretary Kenneth Baker and "establishing training programmes for low-income youth."

Letwin said it would not ameliorate the situation but would do little more than "subsidise Rastafarian arts and crafts workshops" stating that black "entrepreneurs will set up in the disco and drug trade." When the 1985 paper was released to public record by the Cabinet Office along with other Whitehall papers under accelerated procedures of the 30 years rule into the public record through the National Archives in Kew, West London on 30 December 2015, a chastened Letwin apologised on the same day for "the offence caused".

Following reports tonight, I want to make clear that some parts of a private memo I wrote nearly 30 years ago were both badly worded and wrong. I apologise unreservedly for any offence these comments have caused and wish to make clear that none was intended.

— Oliver Letwin, Statement 30 December 2015

Trevor Phillips OBE, former head of the Equality and Human Rights Commission observed that, "I don't think these remarks would have raised a single eyebrow at the time."

The 1985 Broadwater Farm memo argued the riots were caused by bad behaviour not social conditions. The policy unit proposed a programme for creating "better attitudes," including measures to encourage the establishment of 'old-fashioned independent schools' which Cabinet Secretary Sir Robert Armstrong warned in 1985 constituted social engineering.

The root of social malaise is not poor housing, or youth 'alienation' or the lack of a middle class. ... Lower-class, unemployed white people lived for years in appalling slums without a breakdown of public order on anything like the present scale; in the midst of the depression, people in Brixton went out, leaving their grocery money in a bag at the front door, and expecting to see groceries there when they got back ... Riots, criminality and social disintegration are caused solely by individual characters and attitudes. So long as bad moral attitudes remain, all efforts to improve the inner cities will founder ... [Lord] Young's new entrepreneurs will set up in the disco and drug trade; Kenneth Baker's refurbished council blocks will decay through vandalism combined with neglect; and people will graduate from temporary training or employment programmes into unemployment or crime.

— Oliver Letwin and Hartley Booth. November 1985. Policy Broadwater Farm memo to Prime Minister Thatcher (released to public domain on 30 December 2015)

Labour MP Chuka Umunna, whose Streatham constituency included parts of Brixton, said the tone of the memo was "positively Victorian." He added:

The attitudes towards the black community exhibited in the paper are disgusting and appalling ... The authors of this paper illustrate a complete ignorance of what was going on in our community at that time, as evidenced by their total and utter disregard of the rampant racism in the Met Police which caused the community to boil over – there is no mention of that racism in their paper.

In July 2014 the Metropolitan Police Commissioner, Sir Bernard Hogan-Howe, apologised "unreservedly" for the shooting and the time it had taken to say sorry" following an inquest into the death of Dorothy "Cherry" Groce, whose shooting by the Metropolitan Police triggered the riots. The jury inquest blamed the Metropolitan Police for failures that contributed to Groce's death.

=== Asylum seekers ===
In 2003, while Shadow Home Secretary, Letwin announced a policy to prevent any asylum seekers entering the UK instead suggesting a "far off-shore processing centre". When questioned about where this processing centre would be, he said "I haven't the slightest idea yet". He had previously suggested holding asylum seekers on prison ships for vetting by security services.

=== NHS privatisation ===
In June 2004, Letwin, then Shadow Chancellor, was reported by an attendee to have stated at a private meeting that within five years from a Conservative election victory "the NHS [would] not exist anymore", to be replaced by a "funding stream handing out money to pay people where they want to go for their healthcare". The incident occurred after he had urged local business lobbying efforts to create a PFI hospital in Dorchester in May, and dismissed revealing the extent of his planned cuts to public spending to the voters as "irrational". Letwin denied the comments after they were exploited by Labour. A Conservative spokesman asserted Letwin's intended meaning to have been that "within five years a Conservative government would have broken down the monolithic bureaucracy of the health service, putting decision-making in the hands of the hospitals rather than the Whitehall pen-pushers", with "a far more efficient and effective NHS" as the end result.

=== Expenses ===
The Daily Telegraph reported in 2009 that Letwin agreed to repay a bill for £2,145 for replacing a leaking pipe under the tennis court at his constituency home in Dorset, which he had claimed on his parliamentary expenses.

=== Public sector reform ===
Speaking to consultancy firm KPMG on 27 July 2011, Letwin caused controversy after stating that you cannot have "innovation and excellence" without "real discipline and some fear on the part of the providers" in the public sector. This was widely reported, with The Guardian headline stating Letwin says "public sector workers need 'discipline and fear'."

=== Government document disposal ===
In October 2011 the Daily Mirror reported a story that Letwin had thrown away more than 100 secret government documents in public bins in St James's Park, with no real care to dispose of them properly. Enquiries made by the Information Commissioner's Office found that although Letwin did not dispose of any government documents, he had in fact disposed of constituents' personal and confidential letters to him and therefore did breach data protection rules. Letwin later apologised for his actions.

== Personal life ==
Letwin married government lawyer Isabel Davidson in 1984; the couple have two children.

In 2003, The Independent reported Letwin saying that he would "go out on the streets and beg" rather than send his children to the state schools in Lambeth where he and his family lived.

== Honours ==
- (United Kingdom) He was sworn of Her Majesty's Most Honourable Privy Council in 2002. This gave him the honorific style "The Right Honourable" for life.
- (United Kingdom) He was awarded a knighthood by Queen Elizabeth II after being recommended by David Cameron in the 2016 Prime Minister's Resignation Honours. This gave him the honorific title "Sir" for life.
- (United Kingdom) He has been elected as a Fellow of the Royal Society of Arts. This gave him the post-nominal letters "FRSA" for life.

== Publications ==
- Oliver Letwin (1981) "Interpreting the Philebus," Phronesis 26: 187–206
- Oliver Letwin (1987) Ethics, Emotion and the Unity of the Self, Routledge, ISBN 0-7099-4110-2
- Oliver Letwin and John Redwood. (1988) Britain's Biggest Enterprise – ideas for radical reform of the NHS, Centre for Policy Studies, ISBN 1-870265-19-X
- Oliver Letwin (1988) Privatising the World: A Study of International Privatisation in Theory and Practice, Thomson Learning, ISBN 0-304-31527-3
- Oliver Letwin (1989) Drift to union: Wiser ways to a wider community, Centre for Policy Studies, ISBN 1-870265-74-2
- Oliver Letwin (2003) The Neighbourly Society: Collected Speeches, Centre for Policy Studies, ISBN 1-903219-60-4
- Oliver Letwin (2017) Hearts and Minds: The Battle for the Conservative Party from Thatcher to the Present, Biteback Publishing, ISBN 1-785903-11-X
- Oliver Letwin (2021) China vs America: A Warning, Biteback Publishing, ISBN 1-785906-84-4

Parliament of the United Kingdom
Preceded by James Spicer	Member of Parliament for West Dorset; 1997–2019	Succeeded by Chris Loder
Political offices
Preceded by David Heathcoat-Amory	Shadow Chief Secretary to the Treasury; 2000–2001	Succeeded by John Bercow
Preceded by Ann Widdecombe	Shadow Home Secretary; 2001–2003	Succeeded by David Davis
Preceded by Michael Howard	Shadow Chancellor of the Exchequer; 2003–2005	Succeeded by George Osborne
Preceded by Richard Ottaway as Shadow Secretary of State for the Environment	Shadow Secretary of State for Environment, Food and Rural Affairs; 2005	Succeeded by Peter Ainsworth
New office	Minister of State for Government Policy; 2010–2015	Position abolished
Preceded by The Lord Hill of Oareford	Chancellor of the Duchy of Lancaster; 2014–2016	Succeeded by Patrick McLoughlin
