= North Dorset by-election =

North Dorset by-election may refer to:

- 1905 North Dorset by-election
- 1937 North Dorset by-election
- 1957 North Dorset by-election
