= William Borthwick (Dorset politician) =

British Liberal Party politician, army officer & barrister (1879-1956)

- Hon. William Borthwick in 1929
- Born: 14 June 1879
- Died: 16 December 1956 (aged 77)
- Occupation: British politician

Hon. William Borthwick (14 June 1879 – 16 December 1956) was a British Liberal Party politician, army officer and barrister.

== Background ==
He was the son of Sir Thomas Borthwick, 1st Baronet and Letitia Mary Banks. He was a younger brother of Lord Whitburgh. In 1909 he married Ruth Margery Rigby of Putney, the only daughter of Jason Rigby. They had four children, including a son William Jason Maxwell Borthwick. She died in 1971. In 1913 Borthwick was granted the rank of a baron's son.

== Career ==
He gained the rank of temporary captain in the service of the King's Royal Rifle Corps. He fought in the First World War between 1914 and 1918, during which he was wounded twice and became a prisoner of war. In 1919 he was called to the bar. At parliamentary elections Borthwick contested, as a Liberal party candidate, the North Dorset constituency four times. He was unsuccessful at each election. He did not stand for parliament again.

=== Election results ===
General Election 1929: North Dorset Electorate 31,684
Party	Candidate	Votes	%	±%
Conservative	Cecil Hanbury	12,203	47.3	−6.0
Liberal	Hon. William Borthwick	11,281	43.8	−2.9
Labour	Colin Grant Clark	2,298	8.9	n/a
Majority		922	3.5	
Turnout		25,782	81.4	
Conservative hold		Swing	-1.5	

General Election 1931: North Dorset Electorate 31,898
Party	Candidate	Votes	%	±%
Conservative	Cecil Hanbury	15,499	59.2	+11.9
Liberal	Hon. William Borthwick	10,682	40.8	−3.0
Majority		4,817	18.4	+14.9
Turnout			82.1	+0.7
Conservative hold		Swing	+7.5	

General Election 1935: North Dorset Electorate 32,714
Party	Candidate	Votes	%	±%
Conservative	Sir Cecil Hanbury	13,055	50.1	−9.1
Liberal	Hon. William Borthwick	9,871	37.9	−2.9
Independent Agriculturist	George Henry Lane Fox Pitt-Rivers	1,771	6.8	n/a
Labour	Miss M M Whitehead	1,360	5.2	n/a
Majority		3,184	12.2	−6.2
Turnout			79.7	−2.4
Conservative hold		Swing	-3.1	

1937 North Dorset by-election Electorate
Party	Candidate	Votes	%	±%
Conservative	Angus Valdemar Hambro	12,247	51.1	+1.0
Liberal	Hon. William Borthwick	11,704	48.9	+11.0
Majority		543	2.2	−10.0
Turnout		23,951	73.4	−6.3
Conservative hold		Swing	-5.0	
