= 1937 North Dorset by-election =

UK parliamentary by-election

The 1937 North Dorset by-election was a parliamentary by-election for the British House of Commons constituency of North Dorset on 13 July 1937.

== Vacancy ==
The by-election was caused by the death of the sitting Conservative MP, Sir Cecil Hanbury, on 10 June 1937. He had been MP here since gaining the seat in 1924.

== Electoral history ==
The constituency had been won by the Conservatives at every election since they gained it from the Liberals in 1924. The result had always been close between the two parties since the Liberals won comfortably in 1906. The Labour party had only twice before fought the seat, in 1929 and at the last election in 1935. At that election, an Independent 'Agriculture' candidate from a longstanding local Conservative family pushed Labour into fourth place.

General election 1935: North Dorset Electorate 32,714
Party	Candidate	Votes	%	±%
Conservative	Cecil Hanbury	13,055	50.1	−9.1
Liberal	William Borthwick	9,871	37.9	−2.9
Agriculture	George Pitt-Rivers	1,771	6.8	New
Labour	M M Whitehead	1,360	5.2	New
Majority		3,184	12.2	−6.2
Turnout		26,057	79.7	−2.4
Conservative hold		Swing	-3.1	

== Candidates ==
The Conservative candidate was 54-year-old Captain Angus Hambro. He was Member of Parliament for South Dorset from 1910 to 1922. He became High Sheriff of Dorset in 1934.

The Liberal candidate was 58-year-old the Hon. William Borthwick, who was standing here for the fourth time having contested the General Elections of 1929, 1931 and 1935. He had been an army captain before practising as a barrister. Borthwick was described by a party colleague as "an excellent and able man, but a weak candidate."

== Campaign ==
Polling Day was set for 13 July 1937, 33 days after the death of the previous member.

On 30 June, the Liberal campaign received early encouragement when it was announced that the party had narrowly won the 1937 St Ives by-election.

Nominations closed on 5 July. This time there was no Labour or Independent candidates.

== Result ==
Once again, the Conservatives narrowly won the seat.

North Dorset by-election, 1937 Electorate
Party	Candidate	Votes	%	±%
Conservative	Angus Hambro	12,247	51.1	+1.0
Liberal	William Borthwick	11,704	48.9	+11.0
Majority		543	2.2	−10.0
Turnout		23,951	73.4	−6.3
Conservative hold		Swing	-5.0	

== Aftermath ==
Hambro did not contest the seat again, choosing to retire at the 1945 general election when his successor was defeated by a new Liberal candidate. Borthwick also did not contest another election.

General election 1945: Dorset North Electorate
Party	Candidate	Votes	%	±%
Liberal	Frank Byers	14,444	53.7	+4.8
Conservative	Richard Glyn	12,479	46.3	−4.8
Majority		1,965	7.4	N/A
Turnout		26,923	75.0	+1.6
Liberal gain from Conservative		Swing	+4.8	

== See also ==
- List of United Kingdom by-elections
- United Kingdom by-election records
