= 1905 North Dorset by-election =

UK parliamentary by-election

The 1905 North Dorset by-election was a Parliamentary by-election held on 26 January 1905. The constituency returned one Member of Parliament (MP) to the House of Commons of the United Kingdom, elected by the first past the post voting system.

== Vacancy ==
John Wingfield Digby had been the Conservative member for the seat of North Dorset since the 1892 general election. He died on 25 December 1904 at the age of 46.

== Electoral history ==
The seat had been Conservative since they gained it in 1892. They easily held the seat at the last election, with an increased majority:

General election 1900: North Dorset
Party	Candidate	Votes	%	±%
Conservative	John Wingfield Digby	3,705	53.9	N/A
Liberal	George Hamilton-Gordon	3,165	46.1	N/A
Majority		540	7.8	N/A
Turnout		6,870	82.6	N/A
Conservative hold		Swing	N/A	

== Candidates ==
The Conservatives selected 26-year-old Sir Randolf Baker to defend the seat.

The local Liberal Association selected 37-year-old Arthur Walters Wills as their candidate. He took honours in law in 1890. As a Barrister-at-law, he was called to Bar in 1894 and joined the Western Circuit. He was standing for parliament for the first time.

== Campaign ==
Polling Day was fixed for 26 January 1905, 32 days after the death of the previous MP. The Liberals launched a by-weekly newspaper, the "North Dorset Elector" for the campaign. Religion still played its part in the campaign. Speaking at a meeting of the Blandford Free Church Council, Dr Clifford endorsed the Liberal candidate stressing his opposition to the Unionist government's Education Act 1902 that used taxpayer money to fund protestant schools.

== Result ==
The Liberals gained the seat from the Conservatives:

North Dorset by-election, 1905
Party	Candidate	Votes	%	±%
Liberal	Arthur Walters Wills	4,239	56.0	+9.9
Conservative	Randolf Littlehales Baker	3,330	44.0	−9.9
Majority		909	12.0	N/A
Turnout		7,569	90.8	+8.2
Liberal gain from Conservative		Swing	+9.9	

North Dorset became the 15th Liberal by-election gain of the parliament from the Unionists. It was the second by-election gain in Dorset in less than a year. It was also the second Liberal by-election gain of the month. The national press reporting of the result varied, depending on the political bias. The Liberal papers saw omens for a future general election; The Daily Chronicle said "When by-elections are frequent, when they take place in all parts of the country, and when they exhibit a uniform tendency, it is impossible not to see in them evidence of the general trend of political opinion." The Daily News said "The Government are smitten all over the field; but we suspect that after Lancashire their worst beating will come from agricultural England." The Conservative papers remained in denial; The Times implied the Conservatives could regain North Dorset because they managed to do so in 1892 when they started further behind the Liberals. The Times also believed that the Unionist case for Tariff Reform would win over voters at the next general election.

== Aftermath ==
At the following General Election the result was:

General election 1906: North Dorset
Party	Candidate	Votes	%	±%
Liberal	Arthur Walters Wills	4,153	54.2	−1.8
Conservative	Randolf Littlehales Baker	3,508	45.8	+1.8
Majority		645	8.4	−3.6
Turnout		7,661	90.2	−0.6
Liberal hold		Swing	-1.8	
