= Lisa Nandy =

British politician (born 1979)

The Right Honourable Lisa Nandy MP
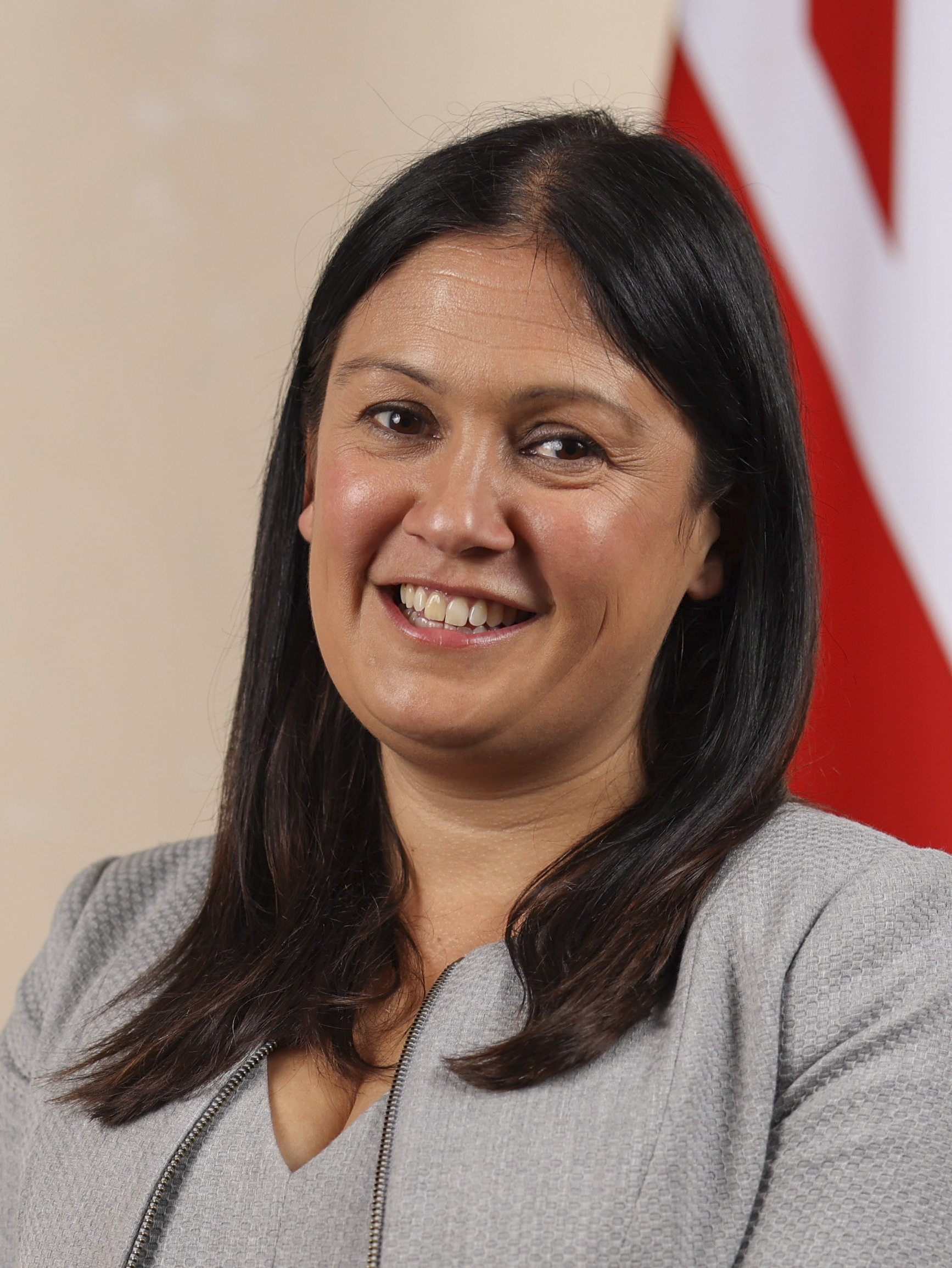
- Official portrait, 2024

Secretary of State for Digital, Culture, Media and Sport (Note: Culture, Media and Sport (2024–2026))
- Incumbent
- Assumed office 5 July 2024
- Prime Minister: Keir Starmer; Andy Burnham
- Preceded by: Lucy Frazer
Shadow cabinet positions
Shadow Minister for International Development
In office 4 September 2023 – 5 July 2024
Leader	Keir Starmer
Preceded by	Preet Gill
Succeeded by	Harriett Baldwin
Shadow Secretary of State for Levelling Up, Housing and Communities
In office 29 November 2021 – 4 September 2023
Leader	Keir Starmer
Preceded by	Steve Reed (Note: Brief previously covered by Reed as Shadow Communities and Local Government Secretary and Lucy Powell as Shadow Housing Secretary)
Succeeded by	Angela Rayner
Shadow Foreign Secretary
In office 5 April 2020 – 29 November 2021
Leader	Keir Starmer
Preceded by	Emily Thornberry
Succeeded by	David Lammy (Note: As Shadow Secretary of State for Foreign, Commonwealth and Development Affairs)
Shadow Secretary of State for Energy and Climate Change
In office 13 September 2015 – 27 June 2016
Leader	Jeremy Corbyn
Preceded by	Caroline Flint
Succeeded by	Barry Gardiner
Junior shadow portfolios
Shadow Minister for Civil Society
In office 7 October 2013 – 14 September 2015
Leader	Ed Miliband; Harriet Harman (Acting)
Preceded by	Gareth Thomas
Succeeded by	Ian Lavery; Anna Turley
Shadow Minister for Children and Young Families
In office 15 May 2012 – 9 October 2013
Leader	Ed Miliband
Preceded by	Catherine McKinnell
Succeeded by	Steve McCabe

Member of Parliament for Wigan
- Incumbent
- Assumed office 6 May 2010
- Preceded by: Neil Turner
- Majority: 9,549 (23.3%)

Personal details
- Born: Lisa Eva Nandy; 9 August 1979 (age 47) Manchester, England
- Party: Labour
- Children: 1
- Parent: Dipak Nandy (father)
- Relatives: Frank Byers (maternal grandfather)
- Education: Newcastle University (BA); Birkbeck, University of London (MSc)
- Website: lisanandy.laboursites.org

Lisa Eva Nandy (born 9 August 1979) is a British politician who has served as Secretary of State for Digital, Culture, Media and Sport since 2024. A member of the Labour Party, she has been the Member of Parliament (MP) for the Wigan constituency since 2010.

Born in Manchester, Nandy is the daughter of Bengali Marxist professor Dipak Nandy and granddaughter of Liberal MP Frank Byers. She attended Parrs Wood High School and was later educated at Holy Cross College. Nandy studied politics at Newcastle University and then obtained a master's degree from Birkbeck, University of London. She worked as a researcher and caseworker for the Walthamstow Labour MP Neil Gerrard, and then for homelessness charity Centrepoint, and then subsequently as a senior policy adviser at The Children's Society. She served as a Labour councillor for the Hammersmith Broadway ward on Hammersmith and Fulham London Borough Council from 2006 to 2010.

Nandy was elected to Parliament as MP for Wigan at the 2010 general election. She joined the frontbench under Ed Miliband as Shadow Children and Young Families Minister in 2012, and in 2013 she was moved to become shadow charities minister. Following the election of Jeremy Corbyn as party leader, she was promoted to the shadow cabinet as shadow energy secretary in 2015. She resigned from the position as part of the 2016 shadow cabinet resignations in protest against Corbyn's leadership. Following Labour's defeat in the 2019 general election, Nandy stood in the party leadership election to replace Corbyn, but finished third behind Keir Starmer. She subsequently was appointed Shadow Foreign Secretary under Starmer, before becoming shadow housing secretary in 2021. In a 2023 reshuffle, she was demoted to shadow cabinet minister for international development.

Following Labour's victory in the 2024 general election, Nandy was appointed to Cabinet as Secretary of State for Digital, Culture, Media and Sport in the Starmer ministry. She was reappointed under Andy Burnham.

== Early life and education ==
Nandy was born in Manchester on 9 August 1979, the daughter of The Hon. Luise (née Byers) and Indian academic Dipak Nandy.

Her maternal grandfather Frank Byers was a Liberal MP who later became a life peer in the House of Lords. Lord Byers later served as the Leader of the Liberals in the House of Lords from 1967 to 1984. Nandy grew up in both Manchester and Bury.

She was educated at the private, fee-paying Moor Allerton Preparatory School, before going to Parrs Wood High School, a co-educational comprehensive school in East Didsbury in Manchester, followed by Holy Cross College in Bury. She studied politics at Newcastle University, graduating in 2001, and obtained a master's degree in public policy from Birkbeck, University of London.

== Early career ==
Nandy worked as a researcher and caseworker for the Walthamstow Labour MP Neil Gerrard. After that, Nandy worked as a researcher at the homelessness charity Centrepoint from 2003 to 2005, and then as senior policy adviser at The Children's Society from 2005 until her election in 2010, where she specialised in issues facing young refugees, also acting as adviser to the Children's Commissioner for England and to the Independent Asylum Commission.

She served as a Labour councillor for the Hammersmith Broadway ward on Hammersmith and Fulham London Borough Council from 2006 to 2010. As a councillor, she served as shadow cabinet member for housing.

== Parliamentary career ==
=== HM Opposition (2010–2024) ===
Nandy was selected as the Labour parliamentary candidate for Wigan in February 2010 from an all-women shortlist. At the 2010 general election, Nandy was elected to Parliament as MP for Wigan with 48.5% of the vote and a majority of 10,487.

She was appointed to the Education Select Committee in July 2010 and was appointed parliamentary private secretary to Tessa Jowell, the Shadow Olympics Minister, in October 2010. In 2012, she succeeded Catherine McKinnell as Shadow Children and Young Families Minister. In October 2013, she was appointed shadow charities minister.

Nandy was re-elected as MP for Wigan at the 2015 general election with an increased vote share of 52.2% and an increased majority of 14,236. Following Labour's general election defeat and Ed Miliband's subsequent resignation as party leader, there was some speculation in the media that Nandy would stand in the leadership election. Nandy declined and endorsed Andy Burnham. In August 2015, Owen Jones said that he encouraged Nandy to stand for the leadership, but the recent birth of her son prevented it.

In September 2015, it was announced that Labour's new leader Jeremy Corbyn had appointed Nandy to serve as Shadow Energy Secretary in the Shadow Cabinet. Along with many colleagues, she resigned from her post in June 2016. In the wake of these resignations, Nandy was approached by Labour MPs who wanted her to stand against Jeremy Corbyn in a leadership election. MPs felt that Nandy and eventual candidate Owen Smith were soft left politicians who could win the leadership. Nandy declined to stand and instead served as co-chair of Smith's campaign team.

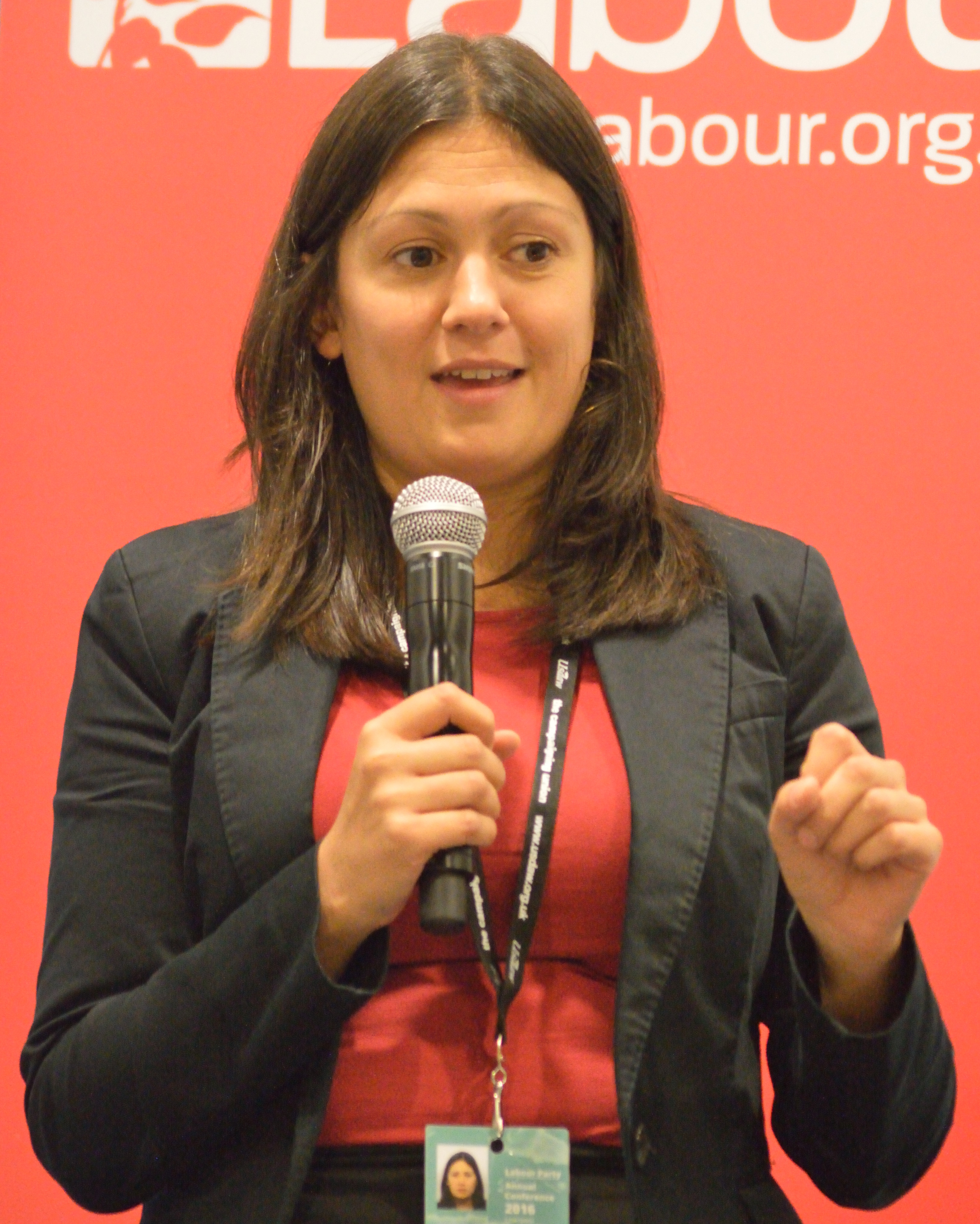
Nandy at the 2016 Labour Party Conference

In 2016 Nandy was appointed as a director of Labour Together, a group formed to "delegitimise and destroy" Corbyn and prevent him winning the next election. This was achieved primarily through planting stories about anti-semitism in the media.

After the election resulted in Corbyn's re-election, Nandy announced that she did not intend to return to the frontbench without the re-introduction of Shadow Cabinet elections, which had been abolished by Ed Miliband in 2011 (the last election being held in 2010). She also spoke of the abuse she had received for not supporting Corbyn, which she described as leaving her "genuinely frightened". She compared her treatment to that which she had received at the hands of the far right when she first campaigned to become MP for Wigan in 2010.

In 2017, Nandy was mentioned in The Guardian and The Telegraph as someone from the left wing of the party who could replace Jeremy Corbyn as leader before the 2017 general election, At the general election, Nandy was again re-elected with an increased vote share of 62.2% and an increased majority of 16,027.

In 2018, Nandy set up the Centre for Towns, with data analytics expert Ian Warren. The Centre for Towns billed itself as an "independent non-partisan organisation dedicated to providing research and analysis of our towns". At the end of 2018 Nandy became the chair of Labour Friends of Palestine and the Middle East.

At the 2019 general election, Nandy was again re-elected, with a decreased vote share of 46.7% and a decreased majority of 6,728.

Nandy was again re-elected at the 2024 general election, with an increased majority of 9,549 and an increased vote share of 47.4%.

==== 2020 leadership election ====
In January 2020, Nandy wrote a letter to the Wigan Post outlining her intention to stand to succeed Jeremy Corbyn in the 2020 leadership election, saying that she wanted to "bring Labour home" to its traditional strongholds. The recent landslide victory of Boris Johnson's Conservative government included having won dozens of seats in many of Labour's historic heartland ("red wall") seats.

On 16 January 2020, during the Labour leadership election, Nandy said that demands for Scottish independence could be overcome with a "social justice agenda", saying that there were times in the past when that had quelled nationalist movements in Catalonia and Quebec. She was criticised by several Scottish National Party politicians, who pointed to police violence and the jailing of politicians during the 2017 Catalan independence referendum to refute her point. In a blog post, Nandy said that police violence in Catalonia was unjustified, and that socialists opposed to separatism "may yet win out".

On 21 January 2020, Nandy was endorsed by the GMB union, which praised her "ambition, optimism, and decisive leadership". In February, she won the endorsement of the Jewish Labour Movement, receiving the backing of 51% of JLM members.

In the event Nandy came third, receiving 79,597 votes (16.2% of the vote share) in the election that promoted Keir Starmer to leader of the Labour Party.

==== Shadow Foreign Secretary ====
On 5 April 2020, Nandy was appointed Shadow Foreign Secretary in the new Shadow Cabinet led by Starmer.

In March 2021, Nandy made her first foreign policy speech at Chatham House. Nandy said her priorities would include national security, Russian aggression and climate change.

==== Shadow Levelling Up Secretary ====
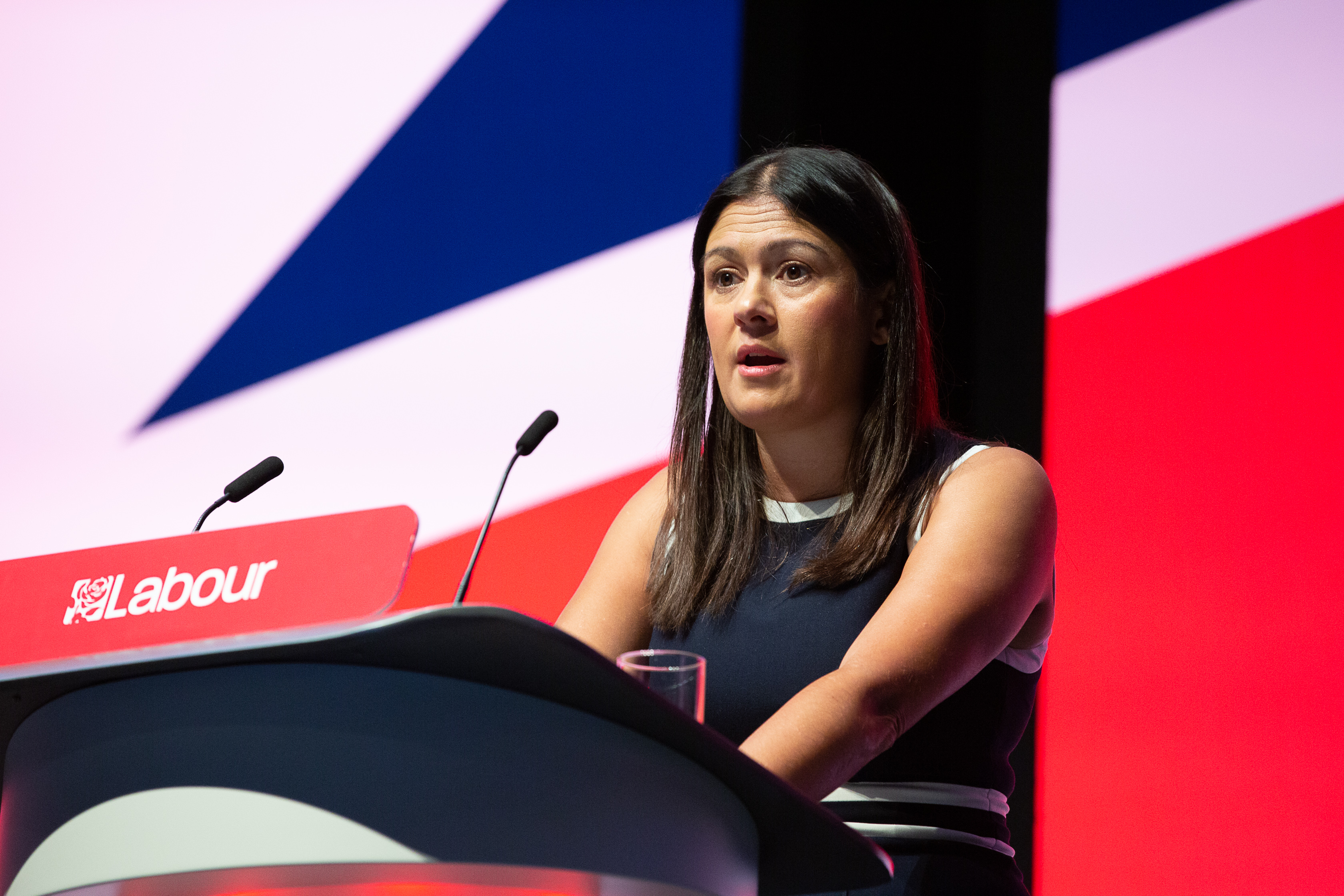
Nandy at the 2022 Labour Party Conference

On 29 November 2021, Nandy was moved to the newly created position of Shadow Secretary of State for Levelling Up, Housing and Communities. In February 2022, Nandy was critical of the Levelling Up White Paper.

==== Shadow International Development Cabinet Minister ====
Following a reshuffle on 4 September 2023, Nandy was appointed the Shadow Cabinet Minister for International Development, replacing Preet Gill. Her move to the position was widely reported as a demotion.

=== Culture Secretary (2024–present) ===
Following the 2024 general election, Nandy was appointed to the Cabinet as Secretary of State for Culture, Media and Sport. She was appointed to the Privy Council and sworn into ministerial office on 6 July.

According to reporting by Declassified UK in July 2024, Rosser Chinn, the president of the Jewish National Fund (JNF) in Britain, has donated to Nandy. Declassified UK states that the JNF has supported illegal Israeli settlements in Palestine. Declassified UK also reported that the "pro-Israel tycoon, former hedge fund manager Stuart Roden" has donated "£80,000 supporting the office costs of Phillipson and Lisa Nandy".

In a joint letter with Secretary of State for Northern Ireland Hilary Benn on 13 September 2024, Nandy confirmed to Stormont's Minister for Communities Gordon Lyons that the government will not be providing funding for the redevelopment of Casement Park in time for the Euro 2028 football tournament.

As Secretary of State for Culture, Nandy suggested in January 2025 a system of general taxation to fund the BBC rather than the current license fee system.

On 6 November 2025, the Manchester Evening News reported that Nandy had apologised to Prime Minister Keir Starmer after she was found to have breached the governance code on public appointments.

On 20 July 2026, Nandy was reappointed under Andy Burnham.

In November 2026, following the conviction of Russell Brand, Nandy convened a meeting of creative industry leaders on abuse and harassment and said the government would look to mandate action if the sector did not reform itself.

== Political positions ==
Politico has stated that she is on the "centre left" of the Labour Party, and is a "clear break from Corbynism". The Conservative MP Paul Bristow described Nandy as being "refreshingly untribal". Nandy's fellow Labour Party MP Jon Cruddas has said that Nandy is on the "authentic soft left" of the party. She has supported Labour's position as an internationalist party, supported remaining in the EU, and supported a "soft" Brexit in opposition to a second Brexit referendum. In October 2019 Nandy was one of nineteen Labour MPs who broke a three line whip to vote through Boris Johnson's EU withdrawal agreement, this was for "hard" Brexit leaving both the Customs Union and Single Market.

On the Israeli–Palestinian conflict, Nandy has supported a two-state solution and opposed the "Trump peace plan" and Israeli occupation of the West Bank. She supports the Palestinian right of return, while also opposing the Boycott, Divestment and Sanctions movement and supporting the right of the Jewish people to self-determination.

Nandy supports "ethical interventionism" and states that although she supports working towards peace, she is "not a pacifist". She has also cited Robin Cook's speech in 1997 on "ethical foreign policy" as an influence on her beliefs, and the UK intervention in Sierra Leone in 2000 as an example of ethical interventionism. She voted against UK airstrikes in Syria in 2015, opposed UK arms exports to Saudi Arabia, the assassination of Qasem Soleimani and the Iraq War.

She criticised China's record on human rights and called for sanctions on Chinese officials. She criticised Russia's record on human rights and the Salisbury poisoning and also former Labour leader Jeremy Corbyn's positions on Russia for standing "with the Russian government, and not with the people it oppresses".

In 2019, the International Court of Justice in The Hague ruled that the United Kingdom must transfer the Chagos Archipelago to Mauritius as they were not legally separated from the latter in 1965. Nandy, in a letter to Foreign Secretary Dominic Raab said the UK's position "is damaging to Britain's reputation, undermines your credibility and moral authority and sets a damaging precedent that others may seize upon to undermine UK national interests, and those of our allies, in other contexts or maritime disputes".

During the first presidency of Donald Trump, when Nandy was standing for Labour leadership, she said that the UK should "engage" with Donald Trump, to "have the argument" with him. She also said that she would oppose signing a trade deal with the United States unless it ratified the Paris Agreement, from which the US withdrew under Trump's presidency.

=== Selected publications ===
- Nandy, Lisa (2005). "The impact of government policy on asylum-seeking and refugee children". Children & Society. 19 (5). Wiley: 410–413. doi:10.1002/chi.896. ISSN 0951-0605.
- Nandy, Lisa (2012). "What would a socially just education system look like?". Journal of Education Policy. 27 (5). Taylor & Francis: 677–680. doi:10.1080/02680939.2012.710021. ISSN 0268-0939. S2CID 145376654.
- Nandy, Lisa; Lucas, Caroline; Bowers, Chris, eds. (2016). The Alternative: Towards a New Progressive Politics. London: Biteback Publishing. ISBN 978-1-7859-0112-6. OCLC 968649949.
- Nandy, Lisa (2016). "Wigan". In Hunt, Tristram (ed.). Labour's Identity Crisis: England and the Politics of Patriotism (PDF). Winchester University Press. pp. 67–70. ISBN 978-1-9061-1320-9. OCLC 952674828.
- Nandy, Lisa (2019). "Bridging the Brexit divide". IPPR Progressive Review. 26 (3). Wiley: 238–242. doi:10.1111/newe.12168. ISSN 2573-2323. S2CID 213834448.
- Nandy, Lisa (8 January 2020). "Back to the Future: The Pulling Apart of our Towns and Cities". The Political Quarterly. 91 (2). Wiley: 324–333. doi:10.1111/1467-923x.12792. ISSN 0032-3179. S2CID 213842724.

== Personal life ==
Nandy's partner, Andy Collis, is a public relations consultant. She has a son, born in April 2015 at Wigan Infirmary Hospital.

She is a member of Unite the Union.

== Notes ==
Parliament of the United Kingdom
Preceded by Neil Turner	Member of Parliament for Wigan; 2010–present	Incumbent
Political offices
Preceded by Catherine McKinnell	Shadow Minister for Children and Young Families; 2012–2013	Succeeded by Steve McCabe
Preceded by Gareth Thomas	Shadow Minister for Civil Society; 2013–2015	Succeeded by Ian Lavery, Anna Turley
Preceded by Caroline Flint	Shadow Secretary of State for Energy and Climate Change; 2015–2016	Succeeded by Barry Gardiner
Preceded by Emily Thornberry	Shadow Secretary of State for Foreign and Commonwealth Affairs; 2020–2021	Succeeded by David Lammy as Shadow Secretary of State for Foreign, Commonwealth and Development Affairs
Preceded by Steve Reed as Shadow Secretary of State for Communities and Local Government; Lucy Powell as Shadow Secretary of State for Housing	Shadow Secretary of State for Levelling Up, Housing and Communities; 2021–2023	Succeeded by Angela Rayner
Preceded by Preet Gill	Shadow Cabinet Minister for International Development; 2023–2024	Vacant
Preceded by Lucy Frazer	Secretary of State for Digital, Culture, Media and Sport; 2024–present	Incumbent
