= Leonard Pagliero =

English stationer (1913–2008)

- Born: 22 August 1913; London, England
- Died: 8 August 2008 (aged 94)
- Organization(s): Stationers Association of Great Britain; The Kennel Club
- Partner: Winifred Pagliero
- Children: Two sons

Leonard Pagliero OBE (22 August 1913 – 8 August 2008) was Director of the Stationers Association and Chairman of The Kennel Club. During World War II, he served as a pilot for RAF Transport Command. He was also a dog show judge and judged several times at Crufts. He became Master of the Worshipful Company of Glass Sellers, and was given the Freedom of the City of London.

== Early life ==
Born to an Italian immigrant, who had moved to England for economic reasons. Leonard decided to fully adopt British nationality rather than Italian.

== Military career ==
Leonard was trained as a pilot at the RAF's Empire Flying Training School in South Africa during World War II. He served with Transport Command, and flew supplies to the Norwegian resistance movement in Short Stirling planes. Following the war, he left the RAF and was invited to pursue a political career, being offered a position as a Liberal Parliamentary candidate but declined, instead returning to his trade in stationery.

== The Kennel Club ==
He was a founding member of the Ruislip and Northwood Canine Training Society, competing with German Shepherd Dogs using the kennel name of Hastehill. During this he met with Pamela Harris, who he would work with to breed Beagles in the Forrardon kennel. Together they would win Best of Breed five times at Crufts, and Ch. Forrardon Appeline Beeswing became Reserve Best in Show at Crufts in 1965.

Pagliero was elected as a member in 1957, before becoming the club's tenth Chairman in 1976 following the resignation of Sir Richard Glyn. During his term, he oversaw full memberships for female members after a campaign led by Florence Nagle and began a series of worldwide kennel club conferences with the first being held in London in 1978. After five years in office he chose to not pursue re-election. He since continued to serve the society as a trustee, an honorary life member and Vice-President. He was also a member of the council for the Guide Dogs for the Blind Association, chairman of both the Beagle Club and the Hound Association, and president of the Windsor Dog Show Society.

He was also a trained dog show judge in both obedience and conformation. At the Centenary Show of Crufts in 1991, he judged Sh Ch. Raycrofts Socialite, a Clumber Spaniel, Best in Show. He had previously judged the Hound Group in 1984 and 1996, as well as the Working Group in 1990.

== Later life ==
He became Director of the Stationers Association, and found the International Federation of Stationers Associations in 1955. He was elected Master of the Worshipful Company of Glass Sellers in 1982. He was also made a Freeman of the City of London.

In the last year of his life he lost the majority of his sight due to macular degeneration. He was cared for by his friend of over twenty years, Liz Cartledge. He died in August 2008, to an expected heart attack.

== Family and heritage ==
His wife Winifred died from Alzheimer's disease in her 60s, and they together had two sons, Michael and John.
