= John Fitzmaurice =

John Fitzmaurice may refer to:

- John Fitzmaurice (writer), administrator, academic and writer
- John Edmund Fitzmaurice, American Roman Catholic bishop
- John FitzMaurice, Viscount Kirkwall, British politician
