= Elsie Burrell =

English painter (1885–1955)

- Born: 10 February 1885; Thetford, Norfolk, England
- Died: 1 February 1955 (aged 69); Dorset, England
- Known for: Watercolours, Portraits

Elsie Burrell (10 February 1885 – 1 February 1955) was an English artist, watercolourist and portrait painter.

Born in Thetford (Norfolk), she was the daughter of Robert George Burrell, a manufacturer of steam engines, and Ellen Alborough Cockayne.

She showed a talent for watercolour: at the age of eleven, she won a prize in a local exhibition. She specialized in portraits, and by 1913, she had moved to London for a career as a society portraitist. Among those whose portraits she painted were actresses Gladys Cooper, Marie Löhr, Muriel Beaumont and Irene Vanbrugh, and society individuals, such as Miriam Rothschild as a young girl and Lady Marjorie Duff. In May 1913, an exhibition of her portraits was held in New Bond Street, London, and in March-April 1914, another was held at the Dudley Galleries, Piccadilly. Her exhibitions were reported by several newspapers and society magazines such as Tatler and The Sketch, which published black and white reproductions. Colour reproductions were sold during her exhibitions and as postcards. Reviewers noted that her style had "grace and simplicity"; despite the "over-prettiness" of her works, it evolved to "a happy knack of catching likenesses" and a "gift of depicting life-like expression".

In 1915 she painted and exhibited portraits of soldiers. During a sitting, she met Major Boyd Alexander Cuninghame (born in Australia in 1871); who had fought in the Boer War and, during WWI, against the Germans in Rhodesia, in December 1914 and in 1915. He was wounded and sent back to Britain to recuperate. They married on 12 July 1916; the Tatler had published her photo with the caption "Miss Elsie Burrell. The well-known artist who is shortly to be married to Major Boyd Cuninghame (late Scots Greys), who has been serving with the Northern Rhodesia Rifles". As Major Cuninghame had two farms in Makeni (Lusaka, Rhodesia), Elsie followed him to Africa, abandoning her artistic career and watercolour practice. Less than one year later, in March 1917, Major Cunninghame died of typhoid fever in Elisabethville (Congo). Elsie continued to manage both farms successfully, and samples of wheat she had grown won a prize in London.

In 1920, Randolf Baker, a British politician, met Elsie in Makeni. They married on 29 June 1920 in Livingstone (Rhodesia). The couple ran the farms and divided their time between Rhodesia and Ranston House, near Blandford Forum in Dorset. Their daughter Selina Baker was born in 1925. Elsie died at Ranston House on 1 February 1955.
