= 1957 North Dorset by-election =

By-election for the British House of Commons

The 1957 North Dorset by-election was a parliamentary by-election for the British House of Commons constituency of North Dorset on 27 June 1957.

== Vacancy ==
The by-election was caused by the death of the sitting Conservative MP, Robert Crouch on 7 May 1957. He had been MP here since gaining the seat in 1950.

== Election history ==
North Dorset had been won by the Conservatives at every election since 1950 when they gained the seat from the Liberals. The result at the last general election was as follows;

1955 general election: North Dorset Electorate 44,142
Party	Candidate	Votes	%	±%
Conservative	Robert Crouch	18,906	52.1	+5.1
Liberal	Michael Portman	11,747	32.4	−12.6
Labour	Herbert J. Dutfield	5,633	15.5	+7.5
Majority		7,159	19.7	+17.7
Turnout		36,286	82.2	−4.2
Conservative hold		Swing		

== Candidates ==
The Conservatives selected Lt-Col. Richard Glyn. He had first been chosen by the local Conservatives to defend the seat at the 1945 general election, but was defeated by the Liberal candidate Frank Byers. The Liberals selected 34-year-old John Alun Emlyn-Jones as candidate. He had fought the seat of Barry just outside Cardiff in the 1950 general election. He was the son of John Emlyn Emlyn-Jones who had been the Liberal MP here from 1922 to 1924. Labour re-selected H J Dutfield, who had stood here at the last general election. An Independent candidate, H C Wright, intervened.

== Result ==
North Dorset by-election, 1957 Electorate 45,346
Party	Candidate	Votes	%	±%
Conservative	Richard Glyn	15,513	45.1	−7.0
Liberal	John Alun Emlyn-Jones	12,411	36.1	+3.7
Labour	Herbert J. Dutfield	6,278	18.3	+2.8
Independent	H C Wright	170	0.5	New
Majority		3,102	9.0	−10.7
Turnout		34,372	75.8	−6.4
Conservative hold		Swing	-5.4	

== Aftermath ==
The result at the following general election;

General election 1959: North Dorset Electorate 46,844
Party	Candidate	Votes	%	±%
Conservative	Richard Glyn	20,255	52.7	+0.7
Liberal	John Alun Emlyn-Jones	11,604	30.2	−2.2
Labour	Herbert J. Dutfield	6,548	17.0	+1.5
Majority		8,651	22.5	+2.9
Turnout		38,377	82.0	−0.2
Conservative hold		Swing		

== See also ==
- List of United Kingdom by-elections
- United Kingdom by-election records
