= Dipak Nandy =

Indian academic and administrator (born 1936)

- Born: Dipak K. Nandy; 21 May 1936 (age 90); Calcutta, India
- Education: St Xavier's College; University of Leeds
- Occupations: Academic, administrator
- Spouse(s): Margaret Gracie (m. 1964; sep. 1971) Luise Byers (m. 1972)
- Children: Lisa Nandy

Dipak K. Nandy (Bengali: দীপক নন্দী; born 21 May 1936) is an Indian academic and administrator.

Beginning his career as a lecturer in English literature, Nandy developed a greater interest in race relations and was the first director of the Runnymede Trust. He was later a special consultant to the Home Office and deputy director of the Equal Opportunities Commission. He was a lecturer in English and American Literature at the University of Kent at Canterbury in the mid 1960s.

== Early life ==
Nandy was born in Calcutta, India, on 21 May 1936, into a middle-class Bengali Hindu family, and was educated at St Xavier's College.

He arrived in Britain in March 1956 with the aim of getting a university degree, and worked for a time on the night shift at Cadbury Schweppes. He was then offered a place in the English literature department at the University of Leeds. He later stated that Leeds, in the 1950s, was, in range, variety and intellectual strength, the most exciting place in Britain to be. He took his first degree at Leeds in 1960, then began to work for the degree of doctor of philosophy, but was distracted from that by interests in physics, maths, music, and philosophy, and in 1962 was appointed to his first academic post, at the University of Leicester.

== Career ==
On his arrival at Leicester, his colleague Monica Jones described Nandy as "a coloured communist". In 1964, he was appointed as a lecturer, and from 1964 to 1967 chaired the Leicester Campaign for Racial Equality and also took part in sit-ins at the Admiral Nelson pub, which at that time had a colour bar. In 1966 and 1967, he was Director of the Campaign Against Racial Discrimination Summer Projects; he also joined the Information Panel of the National Committee for Commonwealth Immigrants and served as Secretary of Equal Rights.

Nandy left his academic post in 1968 to found and run the Runnymede Trust, which he directed until 1973. He was also a member of the BBC's Immigrants Advisory Committee and of the Council of the Institute of Race Relations.

In 1969, Nandy worked with the British humanist David Pollock to organise and deliver the Towards an Open Society two-day conference for the British Humanist Association at the Royal Festival Hall, which explored "the character, challenges, and opportunities of an open society [in] an attempt to widen those discussions". The conference brought together luminaries such as Bernard Crick, Anthony Storr, Anthony Wedgwood Benn, Stuart Hood, Edward Boyle, Jo Grimond, John P. Mackintosh, and James Hemming. Nandy contributed a lecture on "race as politics".

After a brief break at Social and Community Planning Research from 1973 to 1974, he was recruited as a special consultant by the Home Office, to work on the Sex Discrimination Bill, before in 1976 helping to draft the Labour government’s Race Relations Act 1976.

In 1975, Hugo Young described Nandy as a highly intelligent academic, administrator and politician.

In 1976, he went to Manchester, where the Equal Opportunities Commission had been located, and remained its Deputy Director and chief policymaker for the next ten years, remaining until 1986. There, among other work, he was intimately involved in driving through the government's policy on taxation (The Taxation of Husband and Wife) by pressing for the equalisation of the State Pension ages of men and women. He successfully briefed Liberal and Labour MPs and peers to redraft the government's proposed amendment to the Equal Pay Act 1970.

In 1979, Nandy began to forge a link with the Directorate-General V of the European Commission, and organised a representative conference on outstanding issues in the progress towards equal treatment of women throughout the nine members of the European Economic Community as at 1981, and acted as the conference secretary.

He was chased through the house and garden by police during the 1981 Moss Side riots after he tried to take a photograph of police officers sitting in the back of a van reading porn. In 1989, he supported Salman Rushdie against the fatwa issued by the Ayatollah Khomeini. His house was firebombed, and he, too, was issued with a fatwa.

Nandy always had a detailed personal interest in broadcasting as 'the way a society talks to itself', and he served as the chairman of the BBC's Immigrant Programme (1983–1988), and as a member of its General Council (1983–1990). He was appointed a member of Lord Annan's Committee of Inquiry into the Future of Broadcasting (1974–77), which created Channel 4 instead of the widely expected ITV2. He successfully lobbied through the Committee's report for a unified Broadcasting Complaints Commission. He was appointed to the Board of Governors of the British Film Institute in 1984.

== Personal life ==
In 1960, while a student at Leeds, Nandy met Margaret Gracie; they married in 1964. They separated in 1971, and in 1972, in Lambeth, Nandy married secondary producer (Ann) Luise Byers, a daughter of Lord Byers, Leader of the Liberals in the House of Lords. Their youngest daughter, Lisa Nandy, was born in 1979. She became a Labour Member of Parliament in 2010, and has stated that her father considers her right wing.

== Publications ==
- Nandy, Dipak (January 1962). "Ancient Indian Materialism". Marxism Today.
- —— (January 1963). "How Not to Write History". Marxism Today.
- —— (1965). Order, empiricism and politics. Philosophical Books.
- —— (September 1965). "Who Is the Leper Now?". The Labour Monthly.
- —— (1965). The English mind. Philosophical Books.
- —— (June 1966). "Immigrants at Work". The Labour Monthly.
- —— (1968). How to Calculate Immigration Statistics. Runnymede Trust.
- —— (1968). Race and Community. ISBN 0950009806.
- —— (July 1968). "La société britannique face aux immigrants de couleur". Le Monde diplomatique.
- —— (1970). How to calculate immigration statistics. Runnymede Trust.
- Nandy, Dipak; Holman, Bob; Lambert, John (1972). Race in the inner city. Runnymede Trust.
- Nandy, Dipak (1982). "Introduction". In Jefferson, Douglas; Martin, Graham (eds.). The Uses of Fiction: Essays on the Modern Novel in Honour of Arnold Kettle. Open University Press. pp. 1–8. ISBN 033510181X.
- —— (30 May 1986). "Famine---who runs the world?". New Statesman.
- Nandy, Dipak (1988). "Arnold Kettle and English Marxist Literary Criticism". Literature and Liberation: Selected Essays. By Kettle, Arnold. Martin, Graham; Owens, W.R. (eds.). Manchester University Press. pp. 1–17. ISBN 0719025419.
- —— (1988). Sir Peter Medawar O.M., C.H., C.B.E., F.R.S. 1915–1987. A Personal Memoir. Runnymede Trust. ISBN 0902397745.

== Filmography ==
- Racial Discrimination, Rediffusion, 1967
- Question Time 14 February 1985
- A Question of Colour, Open University, 1982
