= Arthur Walters Wills =

Member of Parliament for North Dorset
- In office January 1905 – January 1910
- Preceded by: John Wingfield Digby
- Succeeded by: Randolf Littlehales Baker

Personal details
- Born: Arthur Walters Wills; 1868
- Died: 17 November 1948 (aged 79–80)
- Party: Liberal
- Spouse: Margery Eyre-Walker

Arthur Walters Wills (1868-17 November 1948), was a British Liberal Party politician.

== Background ==
He was a son of George Wills of Moretonhampstead, Devon. He was educated at Harrow and Trinity College, Cambridge. He married in 1908, Margery Eyre-Walker of Byfleet, Surrey. They had two sons and two daughters.

== Legal career ==
He took honours in law in 1890. As a Barrister-at-law, he was called to Bar in 1894 and joined the Western Circuit.

== Political career ==
He sat as Liberal MP for Dorset North from January 1905 to January 1910. He was elected at the first time of asking at the North Dorset by-election in January 1905 when he gained the seat from the Conservatives.

1905 North Dorset by-election Electorate 8,338
Party	Candidate	Votes	%	±%
Liberal	Arthur Wills	4,239	56.0	+9.9
Conservative	Randolph Baker	3,330	44.0	−9.9
Majority			12.0	19.8
Turnout			90.8	
Liberal gain from Conservative		Swing	+9.9	

He held the seat a year later at the 1906 General Election.

General election January 1906 Electorate 8,490
Party	Candidate	Votes	%	±%
Liberal	Arthur Wills	4,153	54.2	−1.8
Conservative	Randolf Baker	3,508	45.8	+1.8
Majority			8.4	−3.6
Turnout			90.2	−0.6
Liberal hold		Swing	-1.8	

He lost his seat back to the Conservatives at the January 1910 General Election. He failed to re-gain his seat at the general election 11 months later;

General election December 1910 Electorate 8,525
Party	Candidate	Votes	%	±%
Conservative	Randolf Baker	3,919	50.2	
Liberal	Arthur Wills	3,887	49.8	
Turnout		7,806	91.6	
Majority		32	0.4	
Conservative hold		Swing		

He did not stand for parliament again.

== Sources ==
- Who Was Who
- British parliamentary election results 1885–1918, Craig, F. W. S.

Parliament of the United Kingdom
Preceded by John Kenelm Digby Wingfield-Digby	Member of Parliament for North Dorset; January 1905 – January 1910	Succeeded by Randolf Littlehales Baker
