= North Dorset (constituency) =

Parliamentary constituency in the United Kingdom, 1885 onwards

Coordinates: 51.0058°N 2.1976°W

- County constituency for the House of Commons
- Interactive map of boundaries since 2024
- Boundary of North Dorset in South West England
- County: Dorset
- Electorate: 72,109 (2023)
- Major settlements: Blandford Forum, Gillingham, Shaftesbury, Sturminster Newton, Verwood and Milton Abbas

Current constituency
- Created: 1885
- Member of Parliament: Simon Hoare (Conservative)
- Seats: One

North Dorset is a constituency (Note: A county constituency (for the purposes of election expenses and type of returning officer)) represented in the House of Commons of the UK Parliament since 2015 by Simon Hoare of the Conservative Party. (Note: As with all constituencies, the constituency elects one Member of Parliament (MP) by the first past the post system of election at least every five years.)

== Constituency profile ==
North Dorset is a constituency in Dorset in South West England. Its largest town is Verwood, which has a population of around 14,000. Other settlements include the towns of Blandford Forum, Sturminster Newton, Stalbridge, Shaftesbury and Gillingham and the village of Alderholt.

This is a large, rural constituency with many small, historic market towns and villages lying within the Blackmore Vale and Cranborne Chase natural areas. The constituency is situated close to the Bournemouth, Christchurch and Poole urban area. Blandford Camp, the headquarters of the British Army's Royal Signals, is located just outside Blandford Forum. The constituency's towns generally have above-average levels of wealth, with Verwood being the most affluent. The average house price here is marginally higher than the national and regional averages.

North Dorset has a very high retired population and a low proportion of young adults. Residents have average levels of education and high rates of homeownership. Household income is average and the child poverty rate is low. A high proportion of residents work in the agriculture, retail and education sectors and the percentage claiming unemployment benefits is low. White people made up 97% of the population at the 2021 census.

Most of the constituency is represented by Conservatives at the local council, although some Liberal Democrats were elected in Shaftesbury and in the rural areas closer to the suburbs of Poole and Bournemouth. An estimated 56% of voters in North Dorset supported leaving the European Union in the 2016 referendum, higher than the UK-wide figure of 52%.

== History ==
This seat was created by the Redistribution of Seats Act 1885, since which it has been won at elections by candidates from only two parties. For nineteen of the years between 1885 and 1950, North Dorset was represented by Liberals, and at all other times since 1885 it has been represented by Conservatives. It is historically one of Labour's weakest seats in the country - for example, it gave the party its lowest vote share out of all the seats it contested in 1950 and 1951.

== Boundaries ==
1885–1918: The Borough of Shaftesbury, the Sessional Divisions of Blandford, Shaftesbury, and Sturminster, and part of the Sessional Division of Sherborne.

1918–1950: The Boroughs of Blandford Forum and Shaftesbury, the Urban District of Sherborne, the Rural Districts of Blandford, Shaftesbury, Sherborne, and Sturminster, and part of the Rural District of Wimborne and Cranborne.

1950–1974: The Boroughs of Blandford Forum and Shaftesbury, the Urban District of Wimborne Minster, and the Rural Districts of Blandford, Shaftesbury, Sturminster, and Wimborne and Cranborne.

1974–1983: As 1950 but with redrawn boundaries.

1983–1997: The District of North Dorset, the District of Wimborne wards of Colehill, Corfe Mullen Central, Corfe Mullen North, Corfe Mullen South, Crane, Holt, Sixpenny Handley, Sturminster Marshall, Vale of Allen, and Wimborne Minster, and the District of Purbeck wards of Lytchett Matravers and Lytchett Minster.

1997–2010: The District of North Dorset, and the District of East Dorset wards of Colehill, Crane, Holt, Longham, Sixpenny Handley, Stapehill, Sturminster Marshall, Vale of Allen, and Wimborne Minster.

2010–2024: The District of North Dorset, and the District of East Dorset wards of Alderholt, Crane, Handley Vale, Holt, Stour, Three Cross and Potterne, Verwood Dewlands, Verwood Newtown, and Verwood Stephen's Castle.

2024–present: The District of Dorset wards of Beacon, Blackmore Vale, Blandford, Cranborne & Alderholt, Cranborne Chase, Gillingham, Hill Forts & Upper Tarrants, Puddletown & Lower Winterborne, Shaftesbury Town, Stalbridge & Marnhull, Sturminster Newton, Verwood, and Winterborne North.

Minor changes following re-organisation of local authorities and wards in Dorset.

== Members of Parliament ==
Election	Member	Party
1885	Edwin Berkeley Portman	Liberal
1892	John Wingfield Digby	Conservative
1905 by-election	Arthur Walters Wills	Liberal
January 1910	Sir Randolf Baker	Conservative
1918	Philip Colfox	Unionist
1922	John Emlyn-Jones	Liberal
1924	Sir Cecil Hanbury	Unionist
1937 by-election	Angus Hambro	Conservative
1945	Frank Byers	Liberal
1950	Robert Crouch	Conservative
1957 by-election	Richard Glyn	Conservative
1970	David James	Conservative
1979	Sir Nicholas Baker	Conservative
1997	Robert Walter	Conservative
2015	Simon Hoare	Conservative

== Elections ==
=== Elections in the 2020s ===
General election 2024: North Dorset
Party	Candidate	Votes	%	±%
Conservative	Simon Hoare	18,208	36.6	−27.2
Liberal Democrats	Gary Jackson	16,619	33.5	+13.1
Reform	Ash Leaning	7,894	15.9	N/A
Labour	James Coldwell	4,370	8.8	−3.1
Green	Ken Huggins	2,082	4.2	+0.3
Independent	Si Adams	317	0.6	N/A
UKIP	Jeff Taylor	119	0.2	N/A
SDP	Daniel Woodruffe	74	0.1	N/A
Majority		1,589	3.1	−40.2
Turnout		49,683	68.3	−5.8
Registered electors		72,690		
Conservative hold		Swing	−20.2	

=== Elections in the 2010s ===
2019 notional result
Party	Vote	%
Conservative	34,085	63.8
Liberal Democrats	10,890	20.4
Labour	6,379	11.9
Green	2,110	3.9
Turnout	53,464	74.1
Electorate	72,109	

General election 2019: North Dorset
Party	Candidate	Votes	%	±%
Conservative	Simon Hoare	35,705	63.6	−1.3
Liberal Democrats	David Chadwick	11,404	20.3	+6.8
Labour	Pat Osborne	6,737	12.0	−6.6
Green	Ken Huggins	2,261	4.0	+1.1
Majority		24,301	43.3	−3.0
Turnout		56,107	73.9	−0.1
Conservative hold		Swing		

General election 2017: North Dorset
Party	Candidate	Votes	%	±%
Conservative	Simon Hoare	36,169	64.9	+8.3
Labour	Pat Osborne	10,392	18.6	+9.6
Liberal Democrats	Thomas Panton	7,556	13.6	+1.9
Green	John Tutton	1,607	2.9	−2.8
Majority		25,777	46.3	+6.8
Turnout		55,724	74.0	+2.4
Conservative hold		Swing	−0.7	

General election 2015: North Dorset
Party	Candidate	Votes	%	±%
Conservative	Simon Hoare	30,227	56.6	+5.5
UKIP	Steve Unwin	9,109	17.1	+11.9
Liberal Democrats	Hugo Miéville	6,226	11.7	−25.3
Labour	Kim Fendley	4,785	9.0	+3.6
Green	Richard Barrington	3,038	5.7	+4.7
Majority		21,118	39.5	+25.4
Turnout		53,385	71.6	−1.9
Conservative hold		Swing		

General election 2010: North Dorset
Party	Candidate	Votes	%	±%
Conservative	Robert Walter	27,640	51.1	+4.6
Liberal Democrats	Emily Gasson	20,015	37.0	−0.9
Labour	Mike Bunney	2,910	5.4	−4.2
UKIP	Jeremy Nieboer	2,812	5.2	+1.3
Green	Anna Hayball	546	1.0	−1.3
Monster Raving Loony	Roger Monksummers	218	0.4	N/A
Majority		7,625	14.1	+9.9
Turnout		54,141	73.5	+4.2
Conservative hold		Swing	+2.8	

=== Elections in the 2000s ===
General election 2005: North Dorset
Party	Candidate	Votes	%	±%
Conservative	Robert Walter	23,714	44.9	−1.8
Liberal Democrats	Emily Gasson	21,470	40.7	+2.0
Labour	John Yarwood	4,596	8.7	−2.5
UKIP	Richard Hobbs	1,918	3.6	+1.5
Green	Ralph Arliss	1,117	2.1	N/A
Majority		2,244	4.2	−3.8
Turnout		52,815	71.1	+4.8
Conservative hold		Swing	−1.9	

General election 2001: North Dorset
Party	Candidate	Votes	%	±%
Conservative	Robert Walter	22,314	46.7	+2.4
Liberal Democrats	Emily Gasson	18,517	38.7	−0.4
Labour	Mark Wareham	5,334	11.2	+1.0
UKIP	Peter Jenkins	1,019	2.1	+0.6
Lower Excise Duty Party	Joseph Duthie	391	0.8	N/A
Independent	Cora Bone	246	0.5	N/A
Majority		3,797	8.0	+2.8
Turnout		47,821	66.3	−10.0
Conservative hold		Swing	+1.4	

=== Elections in the 1990s ===
General election 1997: North Dorset
Party	Candidate	Votes	%	±%
Conservative	Robert Walter	23,294	44.3	−10.3
Liberal Democrats	Paula Yates	20,548	39.1	+0.6
Labour	John Fitzmaurice	5,380	10.2	+3.3
Referendum	Margaret Evans	2,564	4.9	N/A
UKIP	David Wheeler	801	1.5	N/A
Majority		2,746	5.2	−10.9
Turnout		52,587	76.3	−5.5
Conservative hold		Swing	−5.5	

General election 1992: North Dorset
Party	Candidate	Votes	%	±%
Conservative	Nicholas Baker	34,234	54.6	−2.5
Liberal Democrats	LE Siegle	24,154	38.5	+2.2
Labour	John Fitzmaurice	4,360	6.9	+0.3
Majority		10,080	16.1	−4.5
Turnout		62,748	81.8	+2.7
Conservative hold		Swing	−2.3	

=== Elections in the 1980s ===
General election 1987: Dorset North
Party	Candidate	Votes	%	±%
Conservative	Nicholas Baker	32,854	57.0	−1.1
Liberal	Geoffrey William Tapper	20,947	36.4	+0.3
Labour	Joseph Hanley	3,819	6.6	+1.4
Majority		11,907	20.6	−1.4
Turnout		57,620	79.1	+2.5
Conservative hold		Swing	−0.7	

General election 1983: Dorset North
Party	Candidate	Votes	%	±%
Conservative	Nicholas Baker	30,058	58.1	−4.1
Liberal	Geoffrey W Tapper	18,678	36.1	+10.1
Labour	Jennifer Fox	2,710	5.2	−6.5
Wessex Regionalists	David Fox	294	0.6	N/A
Majority		11,380	22.0	−14.2
Turnout		51,740	76.6	−3.1
Conservative hold		Swing	−7.1	

=== Elections in the 1970s ===
General election 1979: Dorset North
Party	Candidate	Votes	%	±%
Conservative	Nicholas Baker	40,046	62.2	+11.0
Liberal	G Court	16,750	26.0	−10.0
Labour	MC Rowlands	7,543	11.7	−1.1
Majority		23,296	36.2	+21.0
Turnout		64,339	79.7	+0.5
Conservative hold		Swing		

General election October 1974: Dorset North
Party	Candidate	Votes	%	±%
Conservative	David James	28,891	51.2	+0.4
Liberal	Philip Watkins	20,350	36.0	−3.2
Labour	TG Jones	7,245	12.8	+2.7
Majority		8,541	15.2	+3.7
Turnout		56,486	79.2	−5.2
Conservative hold		Swing		

General election February 1974: Dorset North
Party	Candidate	Votes	%	±%
Conservative	David James	30,288	50.7	
Liberal	Philip Watkins	23,405	39.2	
Labour	TG Smith	6,032	10.1	
Majority		6,883	11.5	
Turnout		59,725	84.4	
Conservative hold		Swing		

General election 1970: Dorset North
Party	Candidate	Votes	%	±%
Conservative	David James	28,471	57.9	+9.7
Liberal	Philip Watkins	12,095	24.6	−10.6
Labour	Haydn R White	8,626	17.5	+0.9
Majority		16,376	33.3	+20.4
Turnout		49,192	78.5	−2.8
Conservative hold		Swing		

=== Elections in the 1960s ===
General election 1966: Dorset North
Party	Candidate	Votes	%	±%
Conservative	Richard Glyn	20,520	48.2	−0.6
Liberal	Richard Anthony Lamb	15,005	35.2	−0.9
Labour	Jack R Rutland	7,090	16.6	+1.3
Majority		5,515	13.0	+0.5
Turnout		42,615	81.3	−0.4
Conservative hold		Swing		

General election 1964: Dorset North
Party	Candidate	Votes	%	±%
Conservative	Richard Glyn	19,898	48.6	−4.2
Liberal	Richard Anthony Lamb	14,768	36.1	+5.9
Labour	John F Armstrong	6,253	15.3	−1.7
Majority		5,130	12.5	−10.0
Turnout		40,919	81.7	−0.3
Conservative hold		Swing		

=== Elections in the 1950s ===
General election 1959: Dorset North
Party	Candidate	Votes	%	±%
Conservative	Richard Glyn	20,255	52.8	+0.7
Liberal	John Emlyn-Jones	11,604	30.2	−2.2
Labour	Herbert J Dutfield	6,548	17.0	+1.5
Majority		8,651	22.6	+2.9
Turnout		38,407	82.0	−0.2
Conservative hold		Swing		

1957 North Dorset by-election
Party	Candidate	Votes	%	±%
Conservative	Richard Glyn	15,513	45.1	−7.0
Liberal	John Emlyn-Jones	12,411	36.1	+3.7
Labour	Herbert J Dutfield	6,278	18.3	+2.8
Independent	H C Wright	170	0.5	N/A
Majority		3,102	9.0	−10.7
Turnout		34,372		
Conservative hold		Swing	−5.4	

General election 1955: Dorset North
Party	Candidate	Votes	%	±%
Conservative	Robert Crouch	18,906	52.1	+5.1
Liberal	Michael Portman	11,747	32.4	−12.6
Labour	Herbert J Dutfield	5,633	15.5	+7.5
Majority		7,159	19.7	+17.7
Turnout		36,286	82.2	−4.2
Conservative hold		Swing		

General election 1951: Dorset North
Party	Candidate	Votes	%	±%
Conservative	Robert Crouch	17,392	47.0	+3.7
Liberal	Frank Byers	16,645	45.0	+1.9
Labour	J. R. Tudor Griffith	2,946	8.0	−5.6
Majority		747	2.0	+1.8
Turnout		36,983	86.4	+1.4
Conservative hold		Swing		

General election 1950: Dorset North
Party	Candidate	Votes	%	±%
Conservative	Robert Crouch	15,324	43.3	−3.0
Liberal	Frank Byers	15,227	43.1	−10.6
Labour	J. R. Tudor Griffith	4,807	13.6	N/A
Majority		97	0.2	N/A
Turnout		35,358	85.0	+10.0
Conservative gain from Liberal		Swing		

=== Elections in the 1940s ===
General election 1945: North Dorset
Party	Candidate	Votes	%	±%
Liberal	Frank Byers	14,444	53.7	+15.8
Conservative	Richard Glyn	12,479	46.3	−3.8
Majority		1,965	7.40	N/A
Turnout		26,923	75.04	−4.9
Liberal gain from Conservative		Swing		

General Election 1939–40

Another General Election was required to take place before the end of 1940. The political parties had been making preparations for an election to take place and by the Autumn of 1939, the following candidates had been selected;

- Conservative: Angus Hambro
- Liberal: Frank Byers
- Labour: CL Lander

=== Elections in the 1930s ===
1937 North Dorset by-election
Party	Candidate	Votes	%	±%
Conservative	Angus Hambro	12,247	51.1	+1.0
Liberal	William Borthwick	11,704	48.9	+11.0
Majority		543	2.2	−10.0
Turnout		23,951	73.4	−6.3
Conservative hold		Swing	−5.0	

General election 1935: North Dorset
Party	Candidate	Votes	%	±%
Conservative	Cecil Hanbury	13,055	50.1	−9.1
Liberal	William Borthwick	9,871	37.9	−2.9
Independent Agriculturalist (Note: Endorsed by the British Union of Fascists)	George Pitt-Rivers	1,771	6.8	N/A
Labour	M M Whitehead	1,360	5.2	N/A
Majority		3,184	12.2	−6.2
Turnout		26,057	79.7	−2.4
Conservative hold		Swing	−3.1	

General election 1931: North Dorset
Party	Candidate	Votes	%	±%
Conservative	Cecil Hanbury	15,499	59.2	+11.9
Liberal	William Borthwick	10,682	40.8	−3.0
Majority		4,817	18.4	+14.9
Turnout		26,181	82.1	+0.7
Conservative hold		Swing	+7.5	

=== Elections in the 1920s ===
General election 1929: North Dorset
Party	Candidate	Votes	%	±%
Unionist	Cecil Hanbury	12,203	47.3	−6.0
Liberal	William Borthwick	11,281	43.8	−2.9
Labour	Colin Clark	2,298	8.9	N/A
Majority		922	3.5	−3.1
Turnout		25,782	81.4	−5.1
Registered electors		31,684		
Unionist hold		Swing	−1.6	

J. Emlyn-Jones

General election 1924: North Dorset
Party	Candidate	Votes	%	±%
Unionist	Cecil Hanbury	11,819	53.3	+5.1
Liberal	John Emlyn-Jones	10,341	46.7	−5.1
Majority		1,478	6.6	N/A
Turnout		22,160	86.5	+2.2
Registered electors		25,616		
Unionist gain from Liberal		Swing	+5.1	

General election 1923: North Dorset
Party	Candidate	Votes	%	±%
Liberal	John Emlyn-Jones	10,992	51.8	−0.5
Unionist	Cecil Hanbury	10,211	48.2	+0.5
Majority		781	3.6	−1.0
Turnout		21,203	84.3	+0.1
Registered electors		25,160		
Liberal hold		Swing	−0.5	

General election 1922: North Dorset
Party	Candidate	Votes	%	±%
Liberal	John Emlyn-Jones	10,805	52.3	+3.0
Unionist	Cecil Hanbury	9,869	47.7	−3.0
Majority		936	4.6	N/A
Turnout		20,674	84.2	+23.2
Registered electors		24,539		
Liberal gain from Unionist		Swing	+3.0	

=== Elections in the 1910s ===
General election 1918: Dorset North
Party		Candidate	Votes	%	±%
C	Unionist	Philip Colfox	7,532	50.7	+0.5
	Liberal	John Emlyn-Jones	7,320	49.3	−0.5
Majority			212	1.4	+1.0
Turnout			14,852	61.0	−29.6
Registered electors			24,334		
	Unionist hold		Swing	+0.5	
C indicates candidate endorsed by the coalition government.

General election December 1910: Dorset North
Party	Candidate	Votes	%	±%
Conservative	Randolf Baker	3,919	50.2	−0.7
Liberal	Arthur Wills	3,887	49.8	+0.7
Majority		32	0.4	−1.4
Turnout		7,806	90.6	−2.7
Registered electors		8,616		
Conservative hold		Swing	−0.7	

General election January 1910: Dorset North
Party	Candidate	Votes	%	±%
Conservative	Randolf Baker	4,093	50.9	+5.1
Liberal	Arthur Wills	3,944	49.1	−5.1
Majority		149	1.8	N/A
Turnout		8,037	93.3	+3.1
Registered electors		8,616		
Conservative gain from Liberal		Swing	+5.1	

=== Elections in the 1900s ===
General election January 1906: Dorset North
Party	Candidate	Votes	%	±%
Liberal	Arthur Wills	4,153	54.2	+8.1
Conservative	Randolf Baker	3,508	45.8	−8.1
Majority		645	8.4	N/A
Turnout		7,661	90.2	+7.6
Registered electors		8,490		
Liberal gain from Conservative		Swing	+8.1	

1905 North Dorset by-election
Party	Candidate	Votes	%	±%
Liberal	Arthur Wills	4,239	56.0	+9.9
Conservative	Randolf Baker	3,330	44.0	−9.9
Majority		909	12.0	N/A
Turnout		7,569	90.8	+8.2
Registered electors		8,338		
Liberal gain from Conservative		Swing	+9.9	

General election January 1900: Dorset North
Party	Candidate	Votes	%	±%
Conservative	John Kenelm Wingfield Digby	3,705	53.9	N/A
Liberal	George Hamilton-Gordon	3,165	46.1	N/A
Majority		540	7.8	N/A
Turnout		6,870	82.6	N/A
Registered electors		8,318		
Conservative hold		Swing	N/A	

=== Elections in the 1890s ===
General election 1895: Dorset North
Party	Candidate	Votes	%	±%
Conservative	John Kenelm Wingfield Digby	Unopposed		
Conservative hold				

General election 1892: Dorset North
Party	Candidate	Votes	%	±%
Conservative	John Kenelm Wingfield Digby	3,981	53.5	+5.2
Liberal	Arthur Arnold	3,456	46.5	−5.2
Majority		525	7.0	N/A
Turnout		7,437	85.3	+4.3
Registered electors		8,714		
Conservative gain from Liberal		Swing	+5.2	

=== Elections in the 1880s ===
General election 1886: Dorset North
Party	Candidate	Votes	%	±%
Liberal	Edwin Berkeley Portman	3,571	51.7	−8.2
Liberal Unionist	Evelyn Ashley	3,336	48.3	+8.2
Majority		235	3.4	−16.4
Turnout		6,907	81.0	−7.6
Registered electors		8,522		
Liberal hold		Swing	−8.2	

General election 1885: Dorset North
Party	Candidate	Votes	%	±%
Liberal	Edwin Berkeley Portman	4,520	59.9	
Conservative	Humphrey Sturt	3,031	40.1	
Majority		1,489	19.8	
Turnout		7,551	88.6	
Registered electors		8,522		
Liberal win (new seat)				

== See also ==
- List of parliamentary constituencies in Dorset
