= Robert Crouch =

British politician (1904–1957)

The Right Honourable Robert Crouch MP

Member of Parliament for North Dorset
- In office 23 February 1950 – 7 May 1957
- Preceded by: Frank Byers
- Succeeded by: Richard Glyn

Personal details
- Born: Robert Fisher Crouch; 7 February 1904
- Died: 7 May 1957 (aged 53)
- Party: Conservative
- Occupation: Farmer, politician

Robert Fisher Crouch (7 February 1904 – 7 May 1957) was a British farmer and politician. In Parliament, as the Conservative Party Member of Parliament for North Dorset, he specialised in agricultural issues, and was known as an independent-minded politician. His most notable contribution was to bring to public attention the Crichel Down affair, in which the Government's failure to sell requisitioned land back to its original owner led to the resignation of the Minister responsible.

== Family and farming ==
Crouch was born in Dorset, to a family who had been clergymen and farmers in the county for 350 years. He attended Milton Abbey School in Blandford Forum, but in 1920 left to immediately start farming in Wiltshire and Dorset. Crouch was a member of the National Farmers Union, and was Chairman of the Sturminster Newton Branch in 1927 and 1928. He served on the Dorset and Wiltshire County Executive of the NFU.

As a recognised authority on growing cereals, Crouch was keenly interested in modernising British agriculture. In 1931 he was the first farmer in Wiltshire to introduce mechanised corn-growing. He was also a member of the Machinery Committee of the Wiltshire War Agricultural Executive Committee throughout the Second World War. In addition to the NFU he was also an active member of the Conservative Party and served as Secretary of the Teffont branch of Salisbury Conservative Association for many years, as secretary and treasurer of Hammoon branch of North Dorset Conservative Association from 1930 to 1942, and as vice-chairman of Salisbury Conservative Association from 1942 to 1947.

== Political prominence ==
In 1946, Crouch was selected as prospective Parliamentary candidate for North Dorset. The constituency was traditionally Conservative but was then narrowly held by the Liberal Chief Whip Frank Byers, and Crouch was one of the more prominent candidates. He was nominated to make a party political broadcast on the BBC Home Service in October 1948, which he began by saying that he was not sorry to have the chance to do a bit of grumbling on the air. Crouch made the point that farmers often grumbled but never went on strike; he called for a long-term policy for agriculture and endorsed the Conservative Agricultural Charter.

== 1950 election ==
At the 1950 general election, Crouch was helped by the decision of the Labour Party to nominate a candidate in North Dorset, as Byers had been able to take all the non-Conservative vote in winning the seat in 1945. In addition, boundary changes were thought to favour the Conservatives. In the event, the Labour vote was the lowest in the country at 14%, but Byers failed to attract enough Labour voters to the Liberals and Crouch won with a majority of 97. A recount was needed to confirm the victory because it was so close.

== Parliamentary privilege ==
Crouch's initial Parliamentary career concentrated on technical matters relating to government support for agriculture and attracted little attention. However, in July 1951 he was involved in a dispute over Parliamentary privilege. An article in the Daily Express had blamed Labour Co-operative MP William Coldrick for the fact that only Co-operative cigarettes were available in the Press Gallery; Coldrick persuaded the House of Commons to pass a motion declaring it a gross libel because he had had nothing to do with the decision. When a motion was made to require the journalist involved to attend the House to apologise, Crouch supported a protest against it on grounds of injustice. He then co-sponsored a motion to rescind the motion declaring the article libellous.

== 1951 election ==
After only eighteen months, Crouch was forced to defend his seat in the 1951 general election. He again faced Frank Byers, who had remained prominent after his defeat as a frequent panellist on "Any Questions?" on radio; Labour again nominated a candidate. The campaign was a rough one, and on 17 October Crouch's solicitors announced that they had been instructed to issue a writ for libel against the Farming Reporter over an article purporting to be an interview with Crouch.

== Private member's bill ==
Crouch was re-elected with a majority of 747, despite Labour again obtaining its lowest vote in the country and the Labour candidate losing his deposit. In the new Parliament, Crouch was selected to introduce a Private Member's Bill and chose a Bill to amend the law on illegitimacy to increase the amount parents were required to pay for the upkeep of a child under an affiliation order. The Affiliation Orders Bill received Government support and was given Royal Assent in the summer.

== Libel case ==
However, Crouch was himself taken to court by Frank Byers early in 1953 over a Conservative election leaflet issued at the end of the 1951 election campaign. The leaflet had pointed to the fact that Frank Byers was appealing for Labour support, then observed that "The Socialist Party chairman at a meeting in Blandford on October 15 called attention to Mr. Byers's broken promises in 1945 and 1946. Don't be taken in again." Byers said that he had given no promises to Labour in 1945 and 1946 and so could not have broken them; his solicitors had written to Crouch after the election offering to settle for an apology and withdrawal. Crouch said that what was written was either true or fair comment, and were privileged.

In court, Crouch's counsel called Charles Greenfield who was a Labour Party member in 1945. Greenfield recalled Byers giving him a pledge to oppose legal disabilities on trade union members, and said he had then worked for Byers' campaign. However, when he had challenged Byers for failing to vote for the repeal of the Trade Disputes and Trade Unions Act 1927, Byers had asked him if he had any witnesses for his pledge. The jury found for Crouch and the Judge awarded costs against Byers.

== Crichel Down ==
Later in 1953, Crouch took up the case of one of his constituents in what became one of the biggest political scandals of the decade. In 1938 the Air Ministry had requisitioned 726 acres (2.94 km^{2}) of land at Crichel Down owned by Lieutenant-Commander G.G. Marten, for use for Royal Air Force bombing practice. The use having finished, the Ministry of Agriculture handed it over to the Commissioners of Crown Lands who converted it to agricultural land (vastly increasing its value) and sought a tenant to farm it, despite a pledge from Winston Churchill to give the previous owners first refusal to buy the land back. Commander Marten protested and obtained the support of his Member of Parliament. Crouch demanded, and obtained, a public inquiry into the disposal of the land.

At the conclusion of the inquiry, which heavily criticised the Ministry, the Minister of Agriculture Sir Thomas Dugdale blandly announced that the Ministry had a binding contract with the tenant and therefore could not sell it back to the successors of the former owners. Crouch was incredulous, and even more angry about the decision of the Ministry not to take action against the civil servants responsible. He kept up the pressure, and a full debate on the report was put down for 20 July 1954. Anger at the conduct of the Ministry did not subside and when Dugdale spoke in opening the debate, he surprisingly announced his resignation from office. Crouch again insisted that the successors of the original owners must be able to repurchase their land, sitting tenant or no.

== Suez group ==
In foreign affairs, Crouch was a member of the 'Suez Group' of Conservative MPs who opposed the withdrawal of the British Army from the Suez Canal zone; he voted with the Suez Group against the Government in a debate on the Anglo-Egyptian Agreement at the end of July 1954. At the 1955 general election he no longer had to face Frank Byers as Liberal candidate, and easily defeated Byers' replacement by 7,159 votes. He was able to take time out to be Chairman of the Conservative marginal seats committee. At this election, the parties were anxious to have a clean and friendly fight, and Crouch benefited from the support of Commander Marten despite Marten's grievance with the Conservative government.

== Ritual slaughter ==
Later that year Crouch called on Chancellor of the Exchequer Harold Macmillan to cut spending by £500m, to increase tax allowances. In December 1956 he announced that he would seek leave to introduce another Private Member's Bill, on slaughter of animals: he wanted to make it compulsory to stun animals before their throats were cut in the Shechita method practised in Judaism. However, his Bill was opposed by Sir Henry d'Avigdor-Goldsmid who argued that Shechita was humane and that the effect of the Bill would be distressing to Jewish people; permission to introduce the Bill was refused by 178 to 132.

== Other matters ==
Crouch became a frequent member of Parliamentary delegations to foreign countries, visiting the Netherlands, Germany, France, Spain and Denmark in 1954 to investigate slaughterhouses, and Egypt, Lebanon, Jordan and Syria in 1955. In December 1955 he paid a visit to Iraq, returning via Lebanon where he visited Palestinian refugee camps.

On behalf of his constituents, Crouch described the petrol rations imposed by Minister of Transport Harold Watkinson after the Suez invasion as "appalling", complaining that most allocations had been cut by 60%.

Parliament of the United Kingdom
Preceded by Frank Byers	Member of Parliament for North Dorset; 1950 – 1957	Succeeded by Richard Glyn
