= Labour Monthly =

British left-wing magazine (1921–1981)

Labour Monthly was a magazine associated with the Communist Party of Great Britain. It was not technically published by the Party, and, particularly in its later period, it carried articles by left-wing trade unionists from outside the Party. It was published from June 1921 to March 1981, and from its inception until his death in 1974 it was edited by leading Party member and theoretician Rajani Palme Dutt, with only a few months absence in 1922 where he was deputised by another leading party figure, Tom Wintringham. The several-page editorial, entitled Notes of the Month, represented official CPGB policy. The intention was to try to keep open a potential channel of communication to Party members in the event of the CPGB being banned at any point.

== Editors ==
1921: R. Palme Dutt
1922: Tom Wintringham (acting)
1922: R. Palme Dutt
1975: Andrew Rothstein (acting)
1976: Pat Sloan
1979: Harry Smith
1981: Andrew Rothstein

== Authors published ==
- Alexander Bogdanov

- "Proletarian Poetry" (1918), Labour Monthly, Vol. IV, No. 5-6, May–June 1923
- "The Criticism of Proletarian Art" (from Kritika proletarskogo iskusstva, 1918) Labour Monthly, Vol. V, No. 6, December 1923
- "Religion, Art and Marxism", Labour Monthly, Vol. VI, No. 8, August 1924

- V. Gordon Childe, "When Labour Ruled Australia", Labour Monthly, Vol III, No. 3, September 1922
- Leonid Krasin
- Dipak Nandy
- Billy Strachan, often wrote under pseudonyms such as "Bill Steel" or "Caliban"
- Sanzō Nosaka

"The Labour Struggle in Japan", part 1, Labour Monthly Vol. 1 August 1921 No. 2
"The Labour Struggle in Japan", part 2, Labour Monthly Vol. 1 September 1921 No. 3
