= List of chairmen of the Kennel Club =

This is a list of chairmen of The Kennel Club, starting from the club's founding in 1873. The Kennel Club dates from the first organised dog show in UK on the 28/29 June 1859, following this in 1870 it was decided that a governing body was required to govern such shows. Sewallis Shirley called together a meeting of the National Dog Club Committee on 4 April 1873, where the Kennel Club was founded. Shirley was named as the first chairman, and would go on to become the president of the society in 1899.

== Chairmen ==
No.	Image	Name	Took office	Left office	Ref
1		Sewallis Shirley	4 April 1873	1899	
2		J. Sidney Turner	1899	1920	
3		Mark Beaufoy	March 1920	10 November 1922	
4		Francis Redmond	1922	3 February 1925	
5		William L. McCandlish	3 February 1925	19 March 1935	
6		George D. Howlett	19 March 1935	1937	
7		Arthur Croxton Smith	1937	1948	
8		John Allan Cecil Cecil-Wright	1948	1973	
9		Sir Richard Glyn, 9th Baronet	1973	December 1976	
10		Leonard Pagliero	December 1976	7 July 1981	
11		John Arnott MacDougall	7 July 1981	1996	
12		J. P. C. "Peter" James	November 1996	11 June 2002	
13		Ronnie Irving	11 June 2002	7 June 2011	
14		Steve Dean	7 June 2011	2 June 2015	
15		Simon Luxmoore	2 June 2015	Incumbent	
