= Mid Somerset =

Former parliamentary constituency in the United Kingdom

- Former county constituency for the House of Commons

1868–1885
- Seats: two
- Created from: East Somerset; West Somerset
- Replaced by: East Somerset; South Somerset; Wells

Mid Somerset was a parliamentary constituency in the county of Somerset, which returned two Members of Parliament (MPs) to the House of Commons of the Parliament of the United Kingdom, elected by the bloc vote system.

It was created for the 1868 general election, and abolished for the 1885 general election, when Somerset was divided into several new single-member constituencies: Bridgwater, Frome, East Somerset, North Somerset, South Somerset, Wellington and Wells.

== Members of Parliament ==
| Year | 1st Member | 1st Party | 2nd Member | 2nd Party |
|---|---|---|---|---|
| 1868 | Richard Paget | Conservative | Ralph Neville-Grenville | Conservative |
| 1878 by-election | Richard Paget | Conservative | William Gore-Langton | Conservative |
| 1885 by-election | Richard Paget | Conservative | John Wingfield Digby | Conservative |
| 1885 | constituency abolished | | | |

== Election results ==
=== Elections in the 1860s ===
General election 1868: Mid Somerset
| Party | Candidate | Votes | % | ±% |
|---|---|---|---|---|
| Conservative | Richard Paget | 3,692 | 32.1 | |
| Conservative | Ralph Neville-Grenville | 3,636 | 31.6 | |
| Liberal | Francis Tagart | 2,151 | 18.7 | |
| Liberal | Edward Augustus Freeman | 2,018 | 17.6 | |
| Majority | | 1,485 | 12.9 | |
| Turnout | | 5,749 (est) | 68.7 (est) | |
| Registered electors | | 8,364 | | |
| Conservative win (new seat) | | | | |
| Conservative win (new seat) | | | | |

=== Elections in the 1870s ===
General election 1874: Mid Somerset
| Party | Candidate | Votes | % | ±% |
|---|---|---|---|---|
| Conservative | Ralph Neville-Grenville | Unopposed | | |
| Conservative | Richard Paget | Unopposed | | |
| Registered electors | | 8,571 | | |
| Conservative hold | | | | |
| Conservative hold | | | | |

Neville-Grenville resigned, causing a by-election.

By-election, 19 Mar 1878: Mid Somerset
| Party | Candidate | Votes | % | ±% |
|---|---|---|---|---|
| Conservative | William Gore-Langton | Unopposed | | |
| Conservative hold | | | | |

=== Elections in the 1880s ===
General election 1880: Mid Somerset
| Party | Candidate | Votes | % | ±% |
|---|---|---|---|---|
| Conservative | William Gore-Langton | Unopposed | | |
| Conservative | Richard Paget | Unopposed | | |
| Registered electors | | 8,470 | | |
| Conservative hold | | | | |
| Conservative hold | | | | |

Gore-Langton resigned, causing a by-election.

By-election, 4 Mar 1885: Mid Somerset
| Party | Candidate | Votes | % | ±% |
|---|---|---|---|---|
| Conservative | John Wingfield Digby | Unopposed | | |
| Conservative hold | | | | |
