= 1878 Mid Somerset by-election =

UK Parliamentary by-election

The 1878 Mid Somerset by-election was fought on 19 March 1878. The by-election was fought due to the resignation of the incumbent Conservative MP, Ralph Neville-Grenville. It was won by the unopposed Conservative candidate William Gore-Langton.
