= John Emlyn-Jones =

Welsh Liberal Party politician and shipowner (1889–1952)

Member of Parliament for North Dorset
- In office 15 November 1922 – 29 October 1924
- Preceded by: William Philip Colfox
- Succeeded by: Cecil Hanbury

Personal details
- Born: John Emlyn Emlyn-Jones; 22 January 1889 Cardiff, Wales
- Died: 3 March 1952 (aged 63) ca 1 km N of Nice-la Var Airport, Nice
- Party: Liberal
- Spouse: Rhoda Emlyn-Jones (19??-1952; their deaths)
- Children: 2

John Emlyn Emlyn-Jones (22 January 1889 – 3 March 1952) was a Welsh Liberal Party politician and shipowner.

== Education and shipping ==
Emlyn-Jones had a private education in Cardiff, France, Spain and Italy before making his reputation in the shipping industry. In 1911 he went into partnership with E. Williams as shipowners. In 1915 he started on his own with a fleet of small coasting steamers using the experience he had gained while working in a shipping office in Bordeaux. In 1920 he founded the Dragon Steam Ship Company to operate deep sea tramping routes. The affairs of his own enterprises took him all over the world on business and he was also a director of the Green Star Shipping Co, the Ocean Salvage and Towage Co and one time Chairman of the Cardiff Pilotage Authority.

In addition, Emlyn-Jones was one time President of Cardiff Chamber of Commerce and was elected Chairman of the Cardiff and Bristol Channel Shipowners' Association in 1931.

== Politics ==
Emlyn-Jones held many offices in the Liberal Party including being Chairman of the Liberal Federation of Wales and President of the North Dorset Liberal Association.

At the 1922 general election, Emlyn-Jones was elected to Parliament for the constituency of North Dorset and he retained the seat in 1923. In a predominantly rural constituency, one of Emlyn-Jones' concerns was to represent the interests of agricultural workers. During the first Labour government, Emlyn-Jones pointed out how Labour, supported by the Conservative opposition, was not standing up robustly enough for agricultural labourers by refusing to incorporate this group into a Minimum Wages Bill, which he attempted unsuccessfully to amend. However, in the 1924 general election it was the Conservatives under Stanley Baldwin, who were mostly credibly able to make a national appeal to farm workers as the champions of rural England and Emlyn-Jones lost his seat to Conservative candidate, Cecil Hanbury.

== Out of Parliament ==
Emlyn-Jones did not seek reselection for the Liberals at the 1929 general election. Instead he was adopted as candidate for Cardiff East being well known as a business man at the docks and as a resident of the constituency. He was reported as being a capable speaker and enthusiastic for the Liberal unemployment scheme which formed a central policy theme of the Liberal election campaign. In 1928 the party had produced a book entitled We Can Conquer Unemployment and promoted the policy vigorously even claiming that 'within twelve months [of a Liberal government taking office] unemployment would be brought down to normal proportions'.

Emlyn-Jones fought Cardiff East again in 1931, stating he was both a supporter of the National Government and a follower of Sir Herbert Samuel. He accepted Ramsay MacDonald's manifesto in its entirety, stating that there must be national unity at a time of national emergency. He indicated he was willing to stand aside to avoid splitting the National vote, if the local Liberal and Conservative Associations decided jointly not to adopt him as the National candidate. But the Conservatives had already adopted South Wales barrister Owen Temple Morris and no accommodation between the parties can have been forthcoming as both Emlyn-Jones and Temple Morris contested the election with Temple Morris emerging the victor. Emlyn-Jones did not stand again at Cardiff in 1935, where the Liberal candidate, A. Pile, lost his deposit. However he was persuaded to contest the seat again at the 1945 general election, when he came third. Emlyn-Jones also served as a Justice of the Peace in Cardiff. Instead he contested the 1935 as Liberal candidate at Flintshire, a seat that the party was defending. In a three-cornered contest, he came second as the Conservative gained the seat. In June 1936 he was elected to serve on the Liberal Party Council.

Emlyn-Jones was married and had one daughter Inez (b. 1916) and one son, John Alun Emlyn-Jones (b. 1923) who was also a Liberal. He fought the seat of Barry just outside Cardiff in the 1950 general election. He also stood as Liberal candidate in the by-election at his father's old seat of North Dorset in 1957 in a closer contest, coming second to the Tory, losing by 3,102 votes. He contested the seat again in the following general election with less success.

== Death ==
Emlyn-Jones and his wife were victims of an air crash. They had boarded the Air France flight bound for Paris from Nice on the morning of 3 March 1952 but the aircraft got into trouble soon after take-off and tried to return to the airfield. It crashed into trees on hills outside Nice and burst into flames, killing 38 passengers and crew members. He was buried at Cathays Cemetery, Cardiff.

Parliament of the United Kingdom
Preceded by William Philip Colfox	Member of Parliament for North Dorset; 1922 – 1924	Succeeded by Cecil Hanbury
