= Cecil Hanbury =

British politician (1871–1937)

The Right Honourable Sir Cecil Hanbury MP
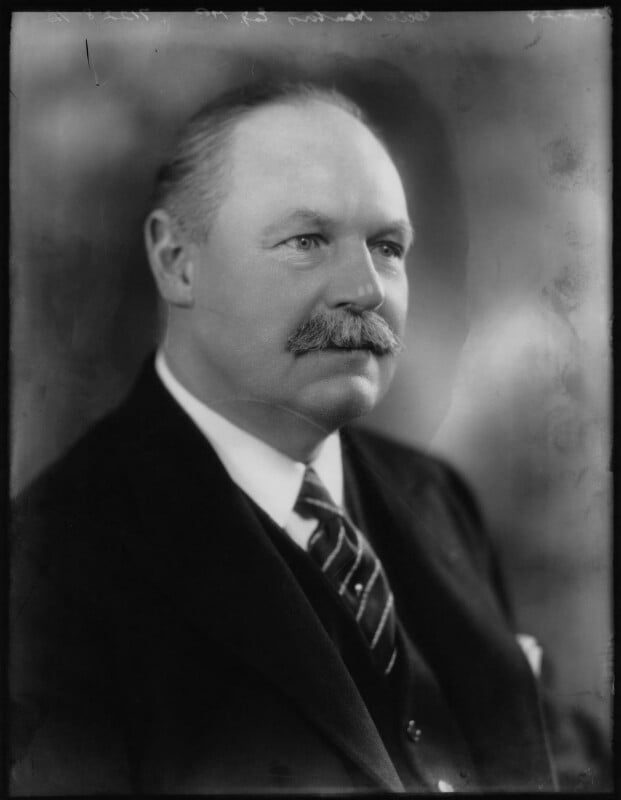
- Hanbury in 1929

Member of Parliament for North Dorset
- In office 29 October 1924 – 10 June 1937
- Preceded by: John Emlyn-Jones
- Succeeded by: Angus Hambro

Personal details
- Born: 10 March 1871 Shanghai
- Died: 10 June 1937 (aged 66)
- Party: Unionist
- Spouse: Effield Dorothy Cecil Symons-Jeune (m. 1913)
- Children: 3

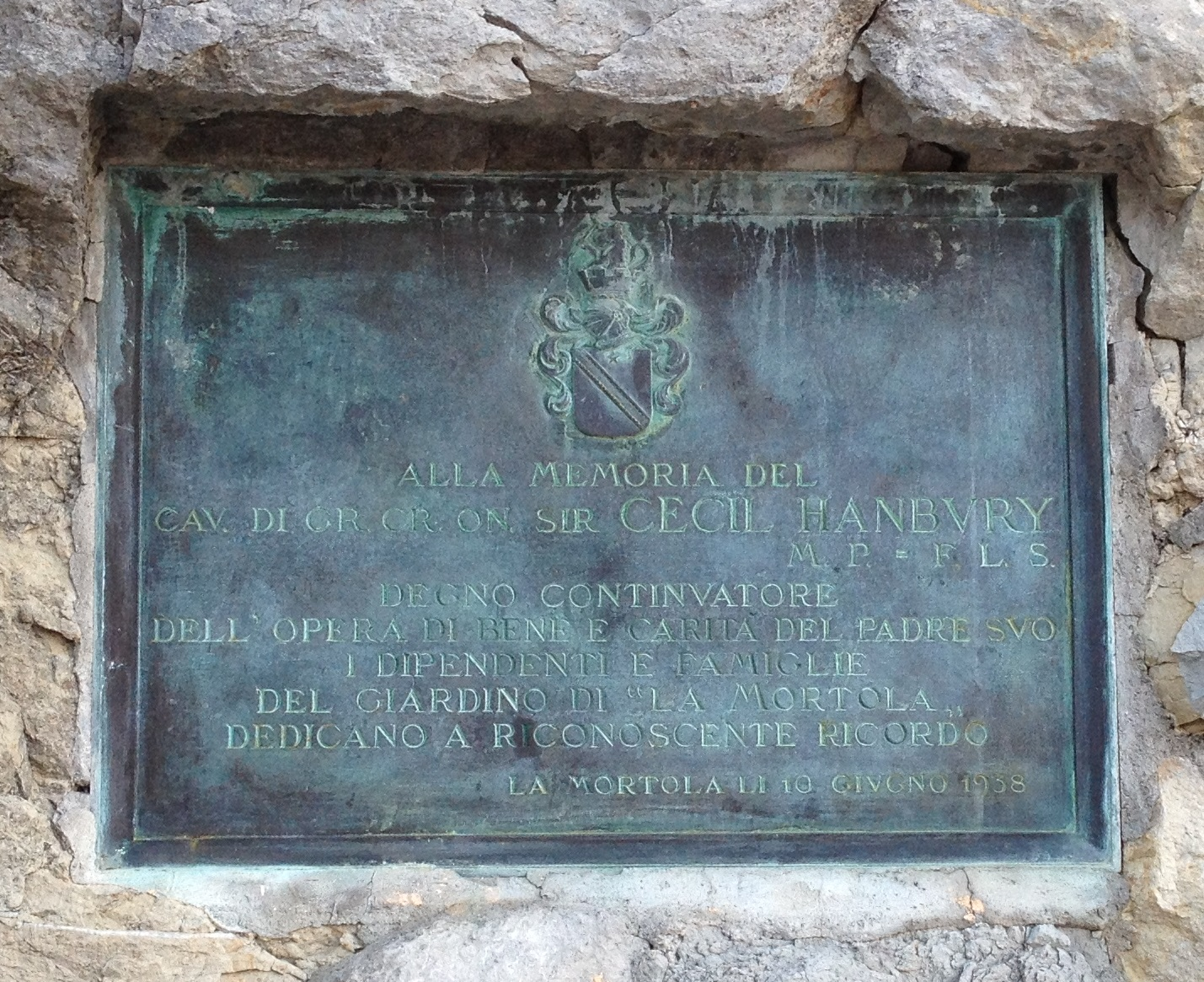
Memorial plaque to Hanbury in Mortola Inferiore

Sir Cecil Hanbury (10 March 1871 – 10 June 1937) was a British Conservative Party politician, the son of Sir Thomas Hanbury and brother of Lady Hilda Currie.

Hanbury was educated at Fettes College and Trinity College, Cambridge, and for most of his working life was a partner in Ward, Hanbury & Company, china merchants in London and Shanghai. He was elected at the 1924 general election as Member of Parliament (MP) for the Northern division of Dorset, having unsuccessfully contested the seat at both the 1922 and 1923 elections. Hanbury was re-elected at the next three general elections, and died in office in 1937, aged 66.

Hanbury was sympathetic to fascism, and in the 1930s he declared his support for Mussolini and the Abyssinian Campaign, for which he was made a Grand Officer of the Italian Order of the Crown. He was knighted on 11 July 1935 in the 1935 Birthday Honours. After his death a memorial plaque was erected in La Mortola, Ventimiglia, where his father owned an estate.

Parliament of the United Kingdom
Preceded by John Emlyn-Jones	Member of Parliament for North Dorset; 1924 – 1937	Succeeded by Angus Hambro
