= Angus Hambro =

British politician

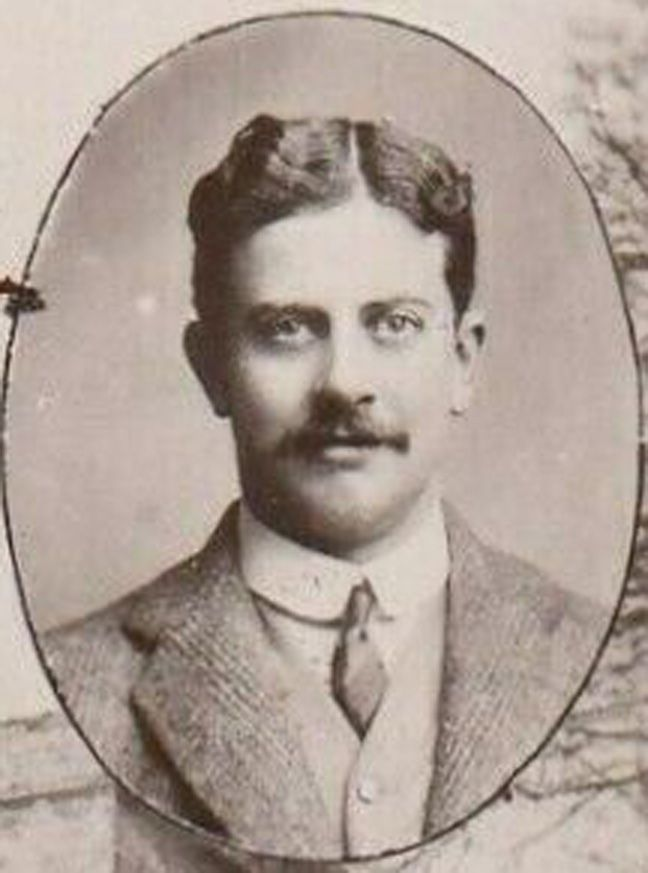

Member of Parliament for South Dorset
- In office January 1910 – 15 November 1922
- Preceded by: Thomas Scarisbrick
- Succeeded by: Robert Yerburgh

Member of Parliament for North Dorset
- In office 13 July 1937 – 5 July 1945
- Preceded by: Cecil Hanbury
- Succeeded by: Frank Byers

Personal details
- Born: Angus Valdemar Hambro; 8 July 1883 Bromley, Kent, United Kingdom
- Died: 19 November 1957 (aged 74) Poole, Dorset, United Kingdom
- Party: Conservative
- Spouse(s): Rosamund Kearsley (1907-1914; her death); Vanda St John Charlton (1916-1957; his death)
- Children: 7; including Jean
- Parent: Everard Hambro (father)
- Education: Eton College
- Occupation: Politician

Angus Valdemar Hambro (8 July 1883 – 19 November 1957) was a British Conservative Party politician.

== Early life ==
Angus Valdemar Hambro was born on 8 July 1883. His father, Sir Everard Hambro, was a banker. His paternal grandfather, Carl Joachim Hambro, was a Danish immigrant who founded the Hambros Bank in London in 1839. His paternal great-grandfather, Joseph Hambro, was a Danish merchant, banker and political advisor. His paternal great-great-grandfather, Calmer Hambro, was a Danish merchant and banker.

He was educated at Eton. He served in the Queen's Own Dorset Yeomanry.

== Career ==
Hambro was Member of Parliament for South Dorset from 1910 to 1922; High Sheriff of Dorset from 1934 to 1935 and a Member of Parliament again from 1937 to 1945, this time for North Dorset.

== Golf ==
He was a noted amateur golfer.

=== Results timeline ===
Tournament	1900	1901	1902	1903	1904	1905	1906	1907	1908	1909
The Open Championship					CUT	WD				
The Amateur Championship				R64		R128	R128	R256	R16	R256

Tournament	1910	1911	1912	1913	1914	1915	1916	1917	1918	1919
The Open Championship		T46				NT	NT	NT	NT	NT
The Amateur Championship	R128	R128	SF	R256	R64	NT	NT	NT	NT	NT

Tournament	1920	1921	1922	1923	1924	1925	1926	1927	1928	1929
The Open Championship			T61							
The Amateur Championship	R16	R128	R256	R128	R64	R32	R64		R256	R256

Note: Hambro only played in the Open Championship and the Amateur Championship.

Top 10
Did not play

NT = No tournament
WD = Withdrew
CUT = Missed the half-way cut
"T" indicates a tie for a place
R256, R128, R64, R32, R16, QF, SF = Round in which player lost in match play

=== Team appearances ===
- England–Scotland Amateur Match (representing England): 1908, 1909, 1910 (winners), 1922
- Coronation Match (representing the Amateurs): 1911

== Notes ==
Parliament of the United Kingdom
Preceded by Thomas Scarisbrick	Member of Parliament for South Dorset; 1910 – 1922	Succeeded by Robert Yerburgh
Preceded by Cecil Hanbury	Member of Parliament for North Dorset; 1937 – 1945	Succeeded by Frank Byers
