= Children & Society =

- Discipline: Social work
- Language: English
- Edited by: Liam Berriman, Deevia Bhana, Sarah Crafter, Martin Robb and Yuwei Xu

Publication details
- History: 1987-present
- Publisher: Wiley-Blackwell on behalf of the National Children's Bureau
- Frequency: Bimonthly
- Impact factor: 1.952 (2020)

Standard abbreviations
- ISO 4: Child. Soc.

Indexing
- ISSN: 0951-0605 (print); 1099-0860 (web)

Links
- Journal homepage; Online access; Online archive

Children & Society is a peer-reviewed academic journal publishing research and debate on all aspects of childhood, and policies and services for children and young people. It is published by Wiley-Blackwell on behalf of the National Children's Bureau.

The journal informs all those who work with and for children, young people and their families by publishing innovative contributions on research and practice across a broad spectrum of topics, including: theories of childhood; children's everyday lives at home, school and in the community; children's culture, rights and participation; children's health and well-being; child protection, early intervention and prevention.

The current editors-in-chief are Liam Berriman (University of Sussex, UK), Deevia Bhana (University of KwaZulu-Natal, South Africa), Sarah Crafter (The Open University, UK), Martin Robb (The Open University, UK), and Yuwei Xu (University of Nottingham, UK). The Book Review Co-Editors are Michael Boampong (The Open University, UK) and Utsa Mukherjee (Brunel University London, UK).

According to the Journal Citation Reports, the journal has a 2020 impact factor of 1.952, ranking it 18th out of 44 journals in the category "Social Work".
