= Randolf Baker =

British politician

Lieutenant-Colonel Sir Randolf Baker Bt DSO TD DL JP
- Baker in 1935

Member of Parliament for North Dorset
- In office January 1910 – 14 December 1918
- Preceded by: Arthur Walters Wills
- Succeeded by: Philip Colfox

Personal details
- Born: Randolf Littlehales Baker; 20 July 1879
- Died: 23 July 1959 (aged 80)
- Party: Conservative
- Spouse(s): Elsie Burrell (1920–1955); Mary Caroline Orlebar (1955–?)
- Occupation: Soldier, politician

Lieutenant-Colonel Sir Randolf Littlehales Baker, 4th Baronet, DSO, TD, DL, JP (20 July 1879 – 23 July 1959) was a British Conservative Party politician.

== Background ==
He was the son of Reverend Sir Talbot Hastings Bendall Baker, 3rd Bt. and Amy Susan Marryat. He succeeded to the Baronetcy on his father's death on 6 April 1900. The family owned the Ranston Estate in Dorset including the Grade I listed Ranston manor house.

== Army career ==
He served in the Dorset Yeomanry, attaining the rank of lieutenant-colonel and being awarded the Territorial Decoration. He fought in the First World War, where he was mentioned in despatches and wounded in 1915. He served in the Dardanelles, from July to October 1915, when he acted as a military landing officer on A Beach East, Suvla Bay; then as second in command of his regiment in Egypt from March 1916 to March 1917, and finally as commanding officer during the Palestine campaign from March to October 1917, including the 1st and 2nd Battles of Gaza. He was awarded the Distinguished Service Order (D.S.O.) (and bar) in 1918. He continued his army career after the end of the war, ultimately being promoted to lieutenant general.

== Political career ==
He sat as Conservative Party MP for Dorset North from January 1910 to December 1918. Having lost to the Liberal candidate in the 1905 by-election and 1906 general election, Baker was first elected at the January 1910 general election, when he gained the seat from the Liberals. He retained his seat in the December 1910 general election.

== Personal life ==
Sir Randolf married, firstly, Elsie Burrell, daughter of Robert George Burrell, on 29 June 1920. He married, secondly, Mary Caroline Orlebar, daughter of Augustus Scobell Orlebar, on 8 October 1955. He had one daughter Selina Littlehales Baker (1925–2010) by his first wife. She married William Harry Gibson Fleming.

He died on 23 July 1959 at age 80. As he had no sons, the baronetcy became extinct on his death.

Parliament of the United Kingdom
Preceded by Arthur Walters Wills	Member of the Parliament for North Dorset; January 1910 United Kingdom general election–1918	Succeeded by Philip Colfox
Baronetage of the United Kingdom
Preceded by Talbot Hastings Baker	Baronet (of Ranston); 1900–1959	Extinct
