= John Wingfield Digby =

British politician (1859–1904)

Member of Parliament for North Dorset
- In office July 4, 1892 – December 25, 1904
- Preceded by: Edwin Berkeley Portman
- Succeeded by: Arthur Walters Wills

Member of Parliament for Mid Somerset
- In office March 4, 1885 – November 24, 1885
- Preceded by: William Gore-Langton
- Succeeded by: constituency abolished

Personal details
- Born: 2 September 1859
- Died: 25 December 1904 (aged 45)
- Party: Conservative

John Kenelm Digby Wingfield Digby (2 September 1859 – 25 December 1904) was an English landowner and Conservative member of parliament. His name is often given as Wingfield-Digby, but the family does not use the hyphen.

== Life ==
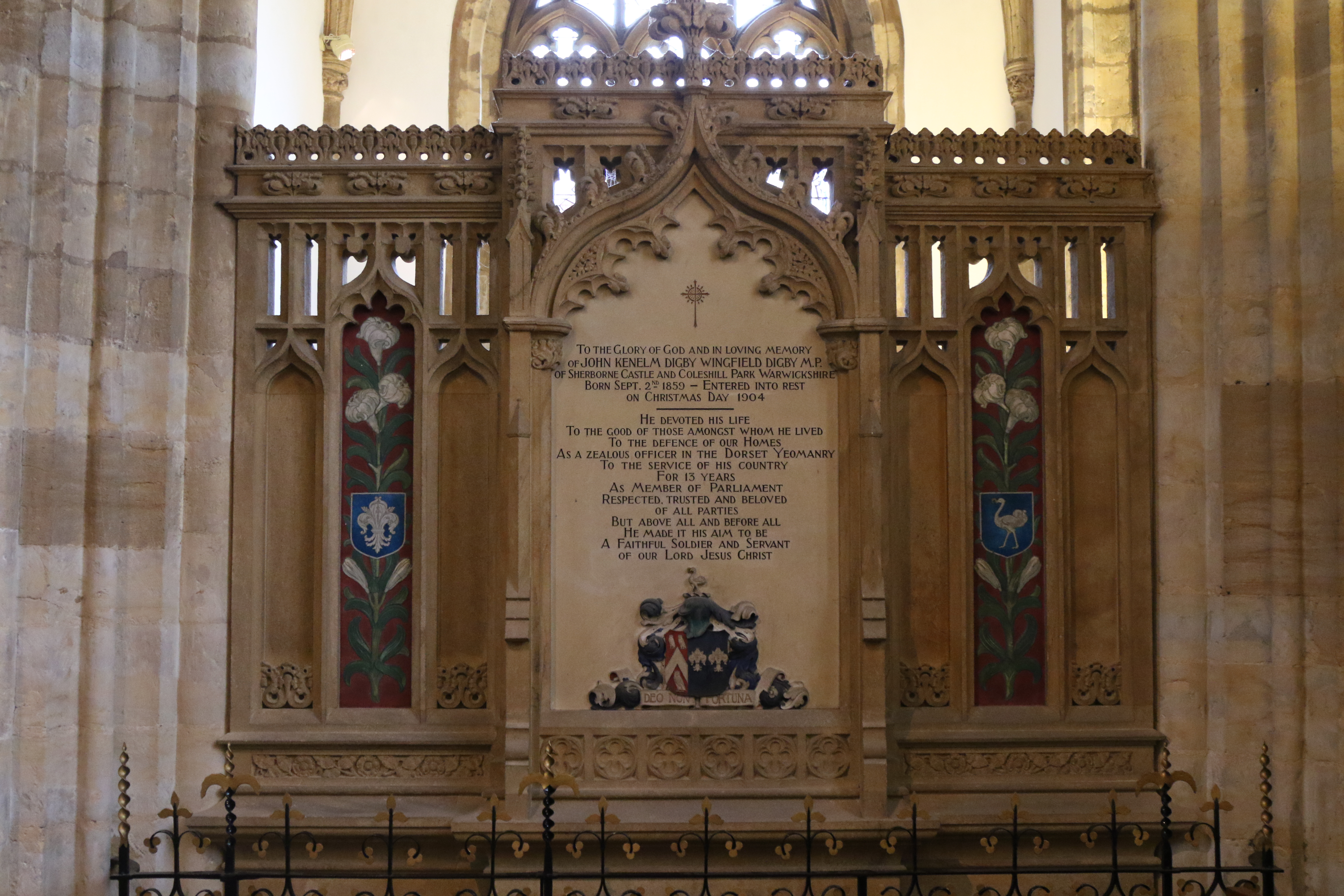
Memorial to Digby in Sherborne Abbey

Wingfield Digby was born at Blythe Hall, Coleshill, Warwickshire, the son of Captain John Digby Wingfield Digby and Maria Madan. A Justice of the Peace, he lived at Coleshill Park, Warwickshire, and Sherborne Castle, Dorset, another family seat.

First elected at a by-election in Mid Somerset in March 1885, Wingfield Digby's seat was abolished with effect from the election of December 1885. He went on to represent North Dorset between the election of 1892 and his death in 1904.

On 13 December 1883 Wingfield Digby married firstly Georgiana Rosamund Hewitt, a daughter of James Hewitt, 4th Viscount Lifford, and Lydia Lucy Wingfield Digby, in County Donegal. On 12 December 1888, his father died, and he inherited landed properties. In 1890 he married secondly Charlotte Kathleen Digby, a daughter of William John Digby and Sara Rebecca Le Poer Trench, at Paddington.

With his first wife, Wingfield Digby had three children, Lydia Mary (1884–1887), Frederick James Bosworth (born 1885) and Georgina Rosamund Lettice (1887–1888). With his second wife, he had a further five children, Kenelm Essex Digby Bosworth (1891–1972), Kathleen Venetia (1892–1982), Dorothy Charlotte Edith (1894–1918), John Reginald (1896–1988), and Robert Almarus Wingfield Digby (1901–1974).
