= John Fitzmaurice (writer) =

John Fitzmaurice (18 November 1947 in Copenhagen - August 2003 in Brussels), was an administrator, academic and writer. He was an author of numerous books and articles on politics, concentrating on party politics and elections. He was an official of the European Commission and a lecturer at the Université libre de Bruxelles.

Fizmaurice was educated at Shaftesbury Grammar School and the University of Bristol. He obtained a Certificate of Education at Oxford People College. In 1973 he began working as an administrator for the European Commission in Brussels.

His political career began when he contested Yeovil for the Labour Party in 1987. He went on to contest North Dorset in 1992 and 1997. Fitzmaurice became secretary of the Brussels Labour Party and the vice-chair of Brussels Co-operative Party. He worked as an administrator for the European Commission, Brussels, in the Department for Liaison with the European Parliament. While in that post he travelled extensively, mainly to carry out research for his next publications.

After he died unexpectedly, a commemoration service was held on 12 November 2003 in the Brussels Van Maerlant Chapel. Among others, Neil Kinnock, vice-president of the European Commission from 1995 until 2004, and Julian Priestley from the European Parliament, spoke during this service.

In memory of John Fitzmaurice, an annual lecture around the themes of democracy, socialism and Europe, is held in Brussels. At the 2007 lecture, Geoff Hoon dedicated his speech to Fitzmaurice. He said:

...it is also a particular honour to give the Brussels Labour Annual Lecture in memory of our colleague and friend, John Fitzmaurice. I knew John during my time in the European Parliament. He then went on to work for the Commission Secretariat General focusing on the relationship between the Commission and the Parliament until his sad death in 2003. John was passionate about European politics and in particular the European Parliament throughout his life and career. I hope that it is something that I have in common with him.

== Works ==
- Party Groups in the European Parliament (1975, Ashgate);
- The European Parliament (1978, Dartmouth);
- The European Parliament (1979, Penguin special, with Robert Jackson);
- Politics in Denmark (1981, Hurst);
- Politics in Belgium (1983, Hurst);
- Québec and Canada: past, present and future (1985, Hurst);
- Security and Politics in the Nordic Area (1987, Avebury);
- Austrian Politics and Society Today (1991, Macmillan);
- The Baltic: A Regional Future? (1992, Macmillan);
- The Politics of Belgium, A Unique Federalism (1996, Westview Press);
- Damming the Danube: Gabcikovo and Post-Communist Politics in Europe (1996, Westview Press)
- Politics and Government in the Visegrad Countries (1998, Macmillan)
