= Frank Byers =

British politician (1915–1984)

The Right Honourable The Lord Byers OBE PC DL

Liberal Chief Whip
- In office 21 March 1946 – 23 February 1950
- Leader: Clement Davies
- Preceded by: Tom Horabin
- Succeeded by: Jo Grimond

Member of Parliament for North Dorset
- In office 5 July 1945 – 23 February 1950
- Preceded by: Angus Hambro
- Succeeded by: Robert Crouch

Member of the House of Lords Lord Temporal
- In office 22 December 1964 – 6 February 1984

Personal details
- Born: Charles Frank Byers; 24 July 1915 Wallasey, Cheshire, England
- Died: 6 February 1984 (aged 68) Westminster, London, England
- Party: Liberal
- Spouse: Joan Oliver (m. 1939)
- Children: 4
- Parent: Charles Cecil Byers (father)
- Relatives: Lisa Nandy (granddaughter)
- Military career
- Allegiance: United Kingdom
- Branch: British Army
- Service years: 1940–1945
- Rank: Lieutenant colonel
- Service number: 124272
- Unit: Royal Artillery
- Conflicts: World War II
- Awards: Mentioned in dispatches; Chevalier of the Legion of Honour; Croix de Guerre

Charles Frank Byers, Baron Byers, OBE, PC, DL (24 July 1915 – 6 February 1984) was a British Liberal Party politician who later became a life peer and Privy Councillor.

== Early life and career ==
Byers was born in Wallasey, Cheshire. He was the son of Charles Cecil Byers (1888–1957), a Lloyd's underwriter, who was Liberal candidate for Westbury at the 1935 general election. He moved with the family to Potters Bar and was educated at Westminster School, followed by Christ Church, Oxford, where he won a Blue for athletics. At Oxford, he was president of the Union of Liberal Students and president of the University Liberal Club. His treasurer was Harold Wilson, later Labour Party prime minister.

Byers was also an exchange scholar at Milton Academy, Massachusetts. While at the University of Oxford, where he gained his degree in Philosophy, Politics and Economics, he met Joan Oliver, whom he married in 1939. They had a son and three daughters. Joan Oliver was a committed Liberal in her own right and was a constant help to her husband during his political career.

Byers was admitted to Gray's Inn after university but broke off his legal education to enlist. During the Second World War, Byers served in the Royal Artillery, rising to the rank of lieutenant-colonel and for a time serving on Field Marshal Montgomery's staff. He was mentioned in dispatches three times, was created a Chevalier of the Legion of Honour and was awarded the Croix de Guerre. In 1944, he was appointed an Officer of the Order of the British Empire.

== Political career ==
In the 1945 general election, Byers gained the formerly Conservative seat of North Dorset, with the absence of a Labour candidate being a key factor in this success. In 1946, Byers was appointed Liberal Chief Whip and gained a reputation for hard work and effective organisation both in parliament and at Liberal Party headquarters. However he was unable to hold the seat in 1950, losing by just 97 votes to the Conservatives following Labour's decision to stand a candidate. He unsuccessfully tried to re-enter the House of Commons in 1960 at the Bolton East by-election.

On 22 December 1964, Byers was created a life peer as Baron Byers, of Lingfield in the County of Surrey and three years later he became leader of the Liberal peers. He was created a Privy Councillor in 1972.

== Personal life ==
Outside Parliament, Byers was a businessman, a director of Rio Tinto Zinc from 1962 to 1973 and a broadcaster. He died of a heart attack on 6 February 1984. A memorial service was held in Westminster Abbey on 5 April 1984. His daughter, TV producer (Ann) Luise married Dipak Nandy, an Indian academic and politician. Luise's daughter, Lisa Nandy, is a Labour MP.

Parliament of the United Kingdom
Preceded by Angus Hambro	Member of Parliament for North Dorset; 1945–1950	Succeeded by Robert Crouch
Party political offices
Preceded by Tom Horabin	Liberal Chief Whip; 1946–1950	Succeeded by Jo Grimond
Preceded by Patrick Moynihan	Chairman of the Liberal Party; 1950–1952	Succeeded by Philip Fothergill
Preceded by The Lord Rea	Leader of the Liberals in the House of Lords; 1967–1984	Succeeded by The Lady Seear
