= Sir Richard Glyn, 9th Baronet =

Lieutenant General Sir Richard Glyn Bt OBE TD DL

Member of Parliament for North Dorset
- In office 27 June 1957 – 18 June 1970
- Preceded by: Robert Crouch
- Succeeded by: David James

Personal details
- Born: Richard Hamilton Glyn; 12 October 1907
- Died: 24 October 1980 (aged 73)
- Party: Conservative
- Spouse(s): Lyndsay Baker (1939-19??; divorced); Barbara Jardine (1970-1980; his death)
- Children: 3
- Occupation: British Army officer, politician

Lieutenant-Colonel Sir Richard Hamilton Glyn, 9th Baronet OBE, TD, DL (12 October 1907 – 24 October 1980) was a British army officer, Conservative politician and authority on breeding pedigree dogs. He was the son of Sir Richard Glyn, 8th Baronet, and his wife Edith Hamilton-Gordon, the great-granddaughter of the Prime Minister Lord Aberdeen.

Glyn was educated at Worcester College, Oxford, where he read law. He was called to the Bar in 1935. Two years later he published what became a standard reference work, "Bull Terriers and How to Breed Them", which he had started to research while at Oxford. His interest in livestock derived from his work on the family estates in Dorset, which he farmed from the 1940s.

During World War II he served with the Queen's Own Dorset Yeomanry and in 1943 wrote a history of the regiment. He was its Commander in 1944–45 and again from 1953 to 1956; on retiring from the full-time army he was an active member of the Territorial Army, being Deputy Commander of No. 128 Infantry Brigade, winning the Territorial Decoration, and becoming ADCTA to the Queen.

At the North Dorset by-election of 1957, Glyn was elected as a Conservative Member of Parliament. While still a new MP he was chosen to second the 'Loyal Address' after the Queen's Speech, and he was appointed as Parliamentary Private Secretary to Sir David Eccles. In 1960 he succeeded as ninth Baronet of Ewell and fifth Baronet of Gaunt's House. He was a Commonwealth War Graves Commissioner.

Glyn's interest in livestock had continued and he was made Chairman of Crufts, a position he held for ten years. After stepping down from Parliament at the 1970 general election, he devoted more time to his hobby and was Chairman of the Kennel Club in 1973.

Parliament of the United Kingdom
Preceded by Robert Crouch	Member of Parliament for North Dorset; 1957–1970	Succeeded by David James
Baronetage of Great Britain
Preceded by Richard Fitzgerald Glyn	Baronet (of Ewell and of Gaunt's House); 1960–1980	Succeeded by Richard Lindsay Glyn
