= 1928 Faversham by-election =

UK parliamentary by-election

The 1928 Faversham by-election was a parliamentary by-election held in January 1928 for the British House of Commons constituency of Faversham, in Kent.

== Previous MP ==
The Conservative MP, Sir Granville Wheler died. He had been the MP since re-gaining the seat from the Liberals in January 1910.

== Previous Result ==
General election, 29 October 1924 Electorate:
Party	Candidate	Votes	%	±%
Conservative	Granville Wheler	14,432	46.9	−5.2
Labour	Stanley J W Morgan	9,180	29.9	−18.0
Liberal	A J Soloman	7,132	23.2	New
Majority		5,252	17.0	+12.8
Turnout		30,744	73.9	+10.5
Conservative hold		Swing	+6.4	

== Candidates ==
Forty-three-year-old Adam Maitland was selected by the local Conservatives to defend the seat. Labour changed their candidate when they chose 44-year-old Dudley Leigh Aman. He had contested Petersfield in 1922, 1923 and Thanet in 1924. The Liberals selected 54-year-old John Freeman Dunn who had been Liberal MP for Hemel Hempstead from 1923 to 1924. E.A. Hailwood, who had contested Southend and Northampton as an Independent Conservative, was standing in his third by-election. His appearance at this by-election resulted in some Conservative party members 'offering violence'.

== Result ==
The Conservative Party held the seat.

Faversham by-election, 1928
Party	Candidate	Votes	%	±%
Unionist	Adam Maitland	12,997	41.7	−5.2
Labour	Dudley Aman	11,313	36.2	+6.3
Liberal	John Freeman Dunn	5,813	18.6	−4.6
Ind. Unionist	E.A. Hailwood	1,090	3.5	New
Majority		1,684	5.5	−11.5
Turnout		31,213	72.4	−1.5
Unionist hold		Swing	-5.8	

== Aftermath ==
Maitland held the seat at the 1929 general election, again defeating Aman. At those elections, Dunn unsuccessfully fought Chichester.

General election, 30 May 1929 Electorate: 52,047
Party	Candidate	Votes	%	±%
Conservative	Adam Maitland	16,219	41.3	−0.4
Labour	Dudley Aman	15,275	38.9	+2.7
Liberal	Maurice Alfred Gerothwohl	7,782	19.8	+1.2
Majority		944	2.4	−3.1
Turnout		39,276	75.5	+3.1
Conservative hold		Swing		
