= Stanley Morgan (disambiguation) =

Stanley Morgan (born 1955) is a retired American football player who played most of his career for the New England Patriots.

Stanley Morgan may also refer to:

- Stanley Morgan (politician) (1870–1951), British clergyman and politician
- Stanley Morgan (author) (1929–2018), British author and actor
- Stanley Morgan Jr. (born 1996), American football player

== See also ==
- Morgan Stanley
