= Maurice Alfred Gerothwohl =

Prof. Maurice Alfred Gerothwohl (13 February 1881 – 11 November 1941), was a British publicist who wrote on international affairs and Liberal Party politician.

== Background ==
He was the son of B. S. Gerothwohl, city merchant and Stéphanie Vuillien. He was educated in Paris, Brussels and Heidelberg.

== Professional career ==
Hansard records that Geraldine Hodgson and French language Professor Gerothwohl had published "grave reflections upon the administration of Bristol university" and these and the resignation of Prof. Terrot R. Glover, D.Litt as a representative, were raised in Parliament as a pretext for a Public Enquiry on 1 May 1913. The enquiry was not authorised and Hodgson was dismissed in 1916.

He wrote numerous articles on foreign politics in the daily, weekly, and monthly press, on Education and French literature. He wrote numerous school and University French texts. He was Co-Editor of Lord D’Abernon’s Diary. He was London Diplomatic Correspondent to the Star and to Universal Service, USA.

== Political career ==
Gerothwol was twice an unsuccessful Liberal candidate for Parliament.

His first campaign was for the Leicester West division at the 1924 General Election. He had success questioning the Labour candidate on their policy of a capital levy. This endeared him to Unionists and one local ward association actually urged their supporters to vote for him. However, the Labour candidate held on by just 737 votes.

General Election 1924: Leicester West
Party	Candidate	Votes	%	±%
Labour	Frederick Pethick-Lawrence	16,047	51.2	+6.6
Liberal	Maurice Alfred Gerothwohl	15,310	48.8	+18.6
Majority		737	2.4	−12.0
Turnout		31,357	76.1	+0.1
Registered electors		41,207		
Labour hold		Swing	−6.0	

He was then Liberal candidate for the Faversham division of Kent at the 1929 General Election.

General Election, 30 May 1929: Faversham
Party	Candidate	Votes	%	±%
Unionist	Adam Maitland	16,219	41.3	−5.6
Labour	Dudley Aman	15,275	38.9	+9.0
Liberal	Maurice Gerothwohl	7,782	19.8	−3.4
Majority		944	2.4	−14.6
Turnout		39,276	75.5	+1.6
Registered electors		52,047		
Unionist hold		Swing	−7.3	

He did not stand for parliament again.

== Publications ==
- Nero in Modern Literature, 1905
- Chatterton, a play in four acts, 1909

== Honours and awards ==
- Grand Officer of the Order of the Crown of Roumania
- Commander of the Star of Roumania
- Commander of the Gediminas order of Lithuania
- Holy Redeemer of Greece
- Officer of the Crown of Belgium
- Order of the White Rose of Finland
- Knight of the Crown of Italy
