= Thomas Bateman Napier =

Thomas Napier

His Hon. Thomas Bateman Napier LLD (1854-6 November 1933), was a British Liberal Party politician and judge.

== Family ==
He was a son of Richard Clay Napier of Preston, and Sarah Bateman of Salford. He was educated at Rugby School and London University. He married first in 1882, Florence Emily Roberts of Upminster, who died in 1915. They had one son who was killed in the Great War, and two daughters. He married second in 1917, Mrs Amy Julia Tootal who died in 1923.

== Legal career ==
During his student days he gained the Incorporated Law Society's Clifford Inn Prize, and Scot. Scholarship, and the Council of Legal Educated's first class International and Roman Law Exhibition, and other law scholarships and prizes. He took a first class in Law at the University of London; honours at Bar Call. Examination. He was elected Fellow and Member of Senate, University of London, in 1895. He became a Justice of the Peace in Middlesex, 1895. He wrote a Concise Practice of the Supreme Court of Justice; The New Land Taxes, 1909–1910. He became Judge of County Courts, in Derbyshire, in 1912.

== Political career ==
He was a Member of the London County Council from 1893 to 1906. He contested Islington North as a Liberal candidate in 1895. He was twice Chairman of Corporate Property, and three times Chairman of Parliamentary Committee, of the London County Council. He sat as Liberal MP for the Faversham Division of Kent from 1906 to 1910. He had gained the seat from the Conservatives at the 1906 General Election

General election 1906 Electorate 14,860
Party	Candidate	Votes	%	±%
Liberal	Thomas Bateman Napier	6,925	57.6	n/a
Conservative	John Howard	5,091	42.4	n/a
Majority		1,834	15.2	n/a
Turnout				n/a
Liberal gain from Conservative		Swing	n/a	

but lost it to them at the next general election in January 1910.

General election January 1910 Electorate 14,649
Party	Candidate	Votes	%	±%
Conservative	Granville Charles Hastings Wheler	7,438	58.0	+15.6
Liberal	Thomas Bateman Napier	5,394	42.0	−15.6
Majority		2,044	16.0	31.2
Turnout			87.6	
Conservative gain from Liberal		Swing	+15.6	

He did not stand for parliament again. He was a co-opted Member of the London Educated Committee, 1915. He became a Governor of Rugby School, in 1927.

== Sources ==
- Who Was Who
- British parliamentary election results 1885–1918, Craig, F. W. S.

Parliament of the United Kingdom
Preceded by John Howard	Member of Parliament for Faversham; 1906–January 1910	Succeeded by Granville Wheler
