= Percy Wells =

British trade union official and Labour Party politician

Percy Lawrence Wells, JP (8 June 1891 – 3 April 1964) was a British trade union official and Labour Party politician.

Wells was born in Kent and went to Stone Church of England school in Greenhithe. At the age of 16 he enlisted in the Royal Navy, in which he served for three years; on leaving, he travelled around the world, stopping in Canada, the United States of America, the Pacific Islands, New Zealand and Australia.

In 1919, Wells became an official of the Transport and General Workers' Union. By the end of the 1930s he was Kent General Secretary of the union, and in 1937 he did his best to stop an unofficial strike of busmen. He was made a justice of the peace for Kent in 1938 and served on the Central Agricultural Wages Board; a large number of TGWU members in Kent were agricultural labourers.

At the 1945 general election, Wells was elected as the member of parliament (MP) for Faversham, and was immediately picked by Ernest Bevin (Foreign Secretary) as his Parliamentary Private Secretary. He retained the role until Bevin's death in 1951.

Later in the 1950s Wells campaigned for more industries to come to Sheerness and the Isle of Sheppey. He had to fight hard in a marginal constituency, and in the 1955 general election had a majority of only 59 votes. Against the trend, he improved his majority in 1959, but only to 253. In poor health, he announced his retirement in 1961, but died before the end of the Parliament. His seat was retained for Labour in the resulting by-election by Terence Boston.

Parliament of the United Kingdom
Preceded by Adam Maitland	Member of Parliament for Faversham; 1945–1964	Succeeded by Terence Boston
