= Herbrand Sackville, 9th Earl De La Warr =

British peer

The Right Honourable The Earl De La Warr GBE PC JP DL
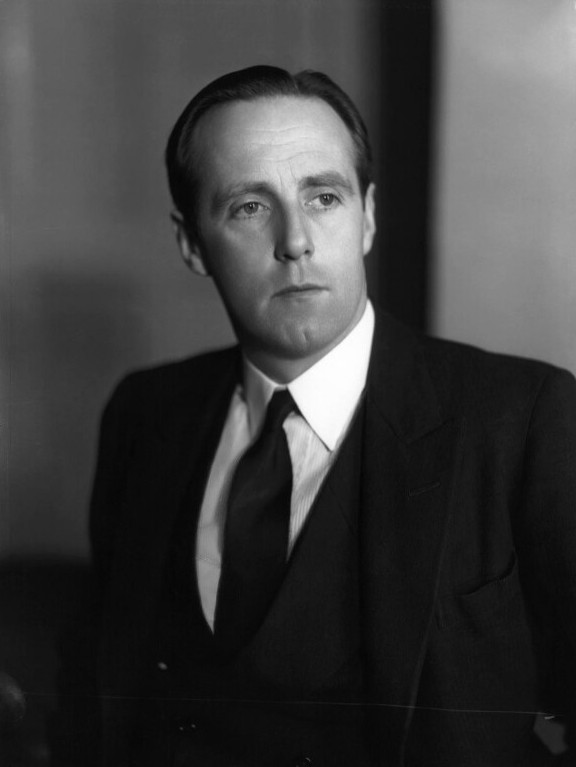

Postmaster General
- In office 5 November 1951 – 5 April 1955
- Monarchs: George VI; Elizabeth II
- Prime Minister: Winston Churchill
- Preceded by: Ness Edwards
- Succeeded by: Charles Hill

First Commissioner of Works
- In office 3 April 1940 – 10 May 1940
- Monarch: George VI
- Prime Minister: Neville Chamberlain
- Preceded by: Herwald Ramsbotham
- Succeeded by: The Lord Tryon

President of the Board of Education
- In office 27 October 1938 – 3 April 1940
- Monarch: George VI
- Prime Minister: Neville Chamberlain
- Preceded by: The Earl Stanhope
- Succeeded by: Herwald Ramsbotham

Lord Keeper of the Privy Seal
- In office 28 May 1937 – 27 October 1938
- Monarch: George VI
- Prime Minister: Neville Chamberlain
- Preceded by: The Viscount Halifax
- Succeeded by: Sir John Anderson

Parliamentary Under-Secretary of State for the Colonies
- In office 30 July 1936 – 28 May 1937
- Monarchs: Edward VIII; George VI
- Prime Minister: Stanley Baldwin
- Preceded by: The Earl of Plymouth
- Succeeded by: The Marquess of Dufferin and Ava

Parliamentary Secretary to the Board of Education
- In office 28 November 1935 – 30 July 1936
- Monarchs: George V Edward VIII
- Prime Minister: Stanley Baldwin
- Preceded by: Herwald Ramsbotham
- Succeeded by: Geoffrey Shakespeare

Parliamentary Secretary to the Ministry of Agriculture and Fisheries
- In office 5 June 1930 – 28 November 1935 (Note: Office vacant from August 1931 to November 1931)
- Monarch: George V
- Prime Minister: Ramsay MacDonald; Stanley Baldwin
- Preceded by: Christopher Addison
- Succeeded by: Herwald Ramsbotham

Parliamentary Under-Secretary of State for War
- In office 11 June 1929 – 5 June 1930
- Monarch: George V
- Prime Minister: Ramsay MacDonald
- Preceded by: The Duke of Sutherland
- Succeeded by: The Lord Marley

Lord-in-waiting Government Whip
- In office 18 July 1929 – 24 August 1931
- Monarch: George V
- Prime Minister: Ramsay MacDonald
- Preceded by: The Earl of Airlie
- Succeeded by: The Viscount Gage
- In office 8 February 1924 – 4 November 1924
- Monarch: George V
- Prime Minister: Ramsay MacDonald
- Preceded by: The Earl of Lucan
- Succeeded by: The Earl of Lucan

Member of the House of Lords Lord Temporal
- In office 21 June 1921 – 28 January 1976; Hereditary Peerage
- Preceded by: The 8th Earl De La Warr
- Succeeded by: The 10th Earl De La Warr

Personal details
- Born: 20 June 1900
- Died: 28 January 1976 (aged 75)
- Party: Labour; National Labour; Conservative
- Spouses: Diana Leigh (m. 1920; died 1966) Sylvia Harrison (m. 1967)
- Children: 3
- Parents: Gilbert Sackville, 8th Earl De La Warr; Muriel Brassey
- Education: Magdalen College, Oxford

Herbrand Edward Dundonald Brassey Sackville, 9th Earl De La Warr, GBE, PC, JP, DL (20 June 1900 – 28 January 1976), styled Lord Buckhurst until 1915 (and sometimes nicknamed "Buck De La Warr" after that), was a British politician. He was the first hereditary peer to join the Labour Party and became a government minister at the age of 23.

He was later one of the few Labour politicians to follow Ramsay MacDonald in the formation of the National Government and the National Labour Organisation. However, he ended his political career as Postmaster General in the Conservative third Churchill ministry.

== Background and education ==
De La Warr was the son of Gilbert Sackville, 8th Earl De La Warr, and Muriel Agnes, daughter of Thomas Brassey, 1st Earl Brassey, eldest son of the railway engineer Thomas Brassey. He was educated at Eton and Magdalen College, Oxford. The son of a Conservative father and Liberal mother, he developed trends towards socialism at university. In 1915 his father was killed in the First World War, and he succeeded to the title as a minor. On reaching 18, he refused as a conscientious objector to take part in active combat, but joined the Royal Naval Reserve (trawler section).

== Political career ==
De La Warr became the first hereditary peer to join the Labour Party, and in February 1924, then aged 23, was one of the youngest ever ministers when he was appointed Lord in Waiting in the first Labour government of Ramsay MacDonald. He made his maiden speech in the House of Lords the same month.

In the second Labour government of 1929 to 1931 he served as Captain of the Honourable Corps of Gentlemen-at-Arms (government chief whip in the House of Lords) and Under-Secretary of State for War between 1929 and 1930, as Parliamentary Secretary to the Ministry of Agriculture and Fisheries between 1930 and 1931 and as a Lord-in-waiting between 1929 and 1931.

In 1931, the Labour government fell and MacDonald formed a National Government. De La Warr was one of only a tiny handful of Labour ministers to join it, and before the 1931 general election was instrumental in the formation of the National Labour Organisation to provide a vehicle of support for MacDonald and other ex-Labour members of the National Government. He resumed office as Parliamentary Secretary to the Ministry of Agriculture and Fisheries, a post he held until 1935, and then served under Stanley Baldwin as Parliamentary Secretary to the Board of Education between 1935 and 1936 and as Under-Secretary of State for the Colonies between 1936 and 1937. In 1936, he was sworn of the Privy Council.

In 1937, new Prime Minister Neville Chamberlain gave De La Warr his first cabinet post as Lord Keeper of the Privy Seal. Like several other younger members of the cabinet, De La Warr found himself disagreeing over the government's foreign policy, and contemplated resigning over the Munich Agreement, but decided not to. In the aftermath of the agreement he was transferred in 1938 to be President of the Board of Education. During his time in this post, it was expected that he would oversee legislation for raising of the school leaving age to 15, but the outbreak of World War II deferred all such plans until the end of hostilities.

In April 1940 De La Warr became First Commissioner of Works in a series of ministerial changes by Chamberlain, but was demoted from the cabinet. The following month Chamberlain was replaced by Winston Churchill, who formed an all-party coalition government, and the objections of the Labour Party to National Labour ministers meant that De La Warr was dropped, and he did not return to government for eleven years.

In 1951, in Churchill's peacetime Conservative government, De La Warr was appointed Postmaster General, and as such, was in charge at the time of the Eastcastle Street robbery, before leaving office for the final time in 1955. He continued to contribute regularly to the House of Lords until 1966, but from then on until his death ten years later only spoke twice, both times in 1972.

Apart from his career in national politics, De La Warr was Mayor of Bexhill-on-Sea between 1932 and 1934 and a Justice of the Peace and Deputy Lieutenant for Sussex. In 1956 he was made a Knight Grand Cross of the Order of the British Empire. The De La Warr Pavilion was built in 1935 in Bexhill-on-Sea and was named after Lord De La Warr. The "De La Warr" in both the pavilion's name and the Earl's name is pronounced "Delaware" (as in the American state named for his ancestor Thomas West, 3rd Baron De La Warr).

== Family ==
Lord De La Warr was twice married. He married firstly Diana Helena, daughter of Henry Gerard Leigh, in 1920. They had two sons and a daughter. Their younger son Thomas Sackville (1922–1943) was killed in action during the Second World War.

After Diana's death in March 1966, he married secondly Sylvia, Countess of Kilmuir, in 1968. She was the daughter of Edith and cotton broker William Reginald Harrison, widow of David Maxwell Fyfe, 1st Earl of Kilmuir, and the sister of actor Sir Rex Harrison.

One of his sisters was Lady Avice Ela Muriel Sackville (d. 1985). He attended her marriage to Stewart Menzies, (leader of British wartime intelligence or 'C'), dressed in a lower-deck seaman's bell-bottomed uniform.

== Death ==
Lord De La Warr died in January 1976, aged 75, and was succeeded in the earldom by his elder and only surviving son, William. The Countess De La Warr died in June 1992.

== Note ==
Political offices
Preceded by The Viscount Valentia; The Lord Somerleyton; The Earl of Bradford; The Earl of Lucan; The Earl of Malmesbury; The Earl of Albemarle	Lord-in-waiting with The Lord Muir-Mackenzie; 1924	Succeeded by The Viscount Gage; The Lord Somers; The Earl of Lucan
Preceded by The Viscount Gage; The Earl of Airlie; The Lord Templemore	Lord-in-waiting; 1929–1931; With: The Lord Muir-Mackenzie	Vacant
Preceded by The Earl of Lucan	Captain of the Honourable Corps of Gentlemen-at-Arms; 1929–1930	Succeeded by The Lord Marley
Preceded by The Duke of Sutherland	Under-Secretary of State for War; 1929–1930	Succeeded by The Lord Marley
Preceded by Christopher Addison	Parliamentary Secretary to the Ministry of Agriculture and Fisheries; 1930–1931	Vacant
Vacant	Parliamentary Secretary to the Ministry of Agriculture and Fisheries; 1931–1935	Succeeded by Herwald Ramsbotham
Preceded by Herwald Ramsbotham	Parliamentary Secretary to the Board of Education; 1935–1936	Succeeded by Geoffrey Shakespeare
Preceded by The Earl of Plymouth	Under-Secretary of State for the Colonies; 1936–1937	Succeeded by The Marquess of Dufferin and Ava
Preceded by Viscount Halifax	Lord Privy Seal; 1937–1938	Succeeded by Sir John Anderson
Preceded by The Earl Stanhope	President of the Board of Education; 1938–1940	Succeeded by Herwald Ramsbotham
Preceded by Herwald Ramsbotham	First Commissioner of Works; 1940	Succeeded by The Lord Tryon
Preceded by Ness Edwards	Postmaster General; 1951–1955	Succeeded by Charles Hill
Peerage of Great Britain
Preceded by Gilbert Sackville	Earl De La Warr; 1915–1976	Succeeded by William Sackville
