= Geraldine Hodgson =

English promoter of teacher training, author, and suffragist

- Born: 19 May 1865; Brighton, England
- Died: 3 December 1937 (aged 72); Clifton, Bristol, England
- Education: Newnham College, Cambridge
- Occupations: lecturer and writer
- Known for: sacked from University College, Bristol

Geraldine Emma Hodgson (19 May 1865 – 3 December 1937) was an English promoter of teacher training, a prolific author and a suffragist. The "Hodgson affair" saw her dismissed from University College, Bristol.

== Life ==
Hodgson was born in Brighton in 1865. She was educated at Newnham College, Cambridge, where she would have gained a first if Cambridge had awarded degrees to women in 1889. She had a wide-ranging career in teaching. She worked briefly in Liverpool at Blackburne House School and as secretary to Rosalind Howard, Countess of Carlisle leaving both jobs in 1890. In the following year she was mistress-in-charge at Newcastle upon Tyne preparatory school and she stayed there until she became deputy head of Leamington High School in 1894. In 1897 she moved to Wales to lecture on English literature at University College, Aberystwyth and stayed until 1899. In the following year her debut novel, Antony Delaval, LL.D., was published.

Hodgson began work at University College, Bristol in 1902. She completed her BA degree in 1904 and published several notable works. She received a Doctor of Literature in 1909 from Trinity College, Dublin.

== Hodgson affair ==
In 1916 she was still the head of the University College, Bristol's women's secondary teacher training department but all was not well. Three years before, a piece had appeared in the local press where an anonymous teacher had complained about her treatment - presumably by Hodgson. Her department had been reorganised and becoming a graduate to teach was not required and she had at best ten students. She was dismissed from the college for reasons that were not made clear. Jealousy of her achievements, her support for the suffrage movement and a dispute with the vice-chancellor, Isambard Owen, are suggested by her biographer as possible factors. However, Hansard, records that she and French language Professor Gerothwohl had published "grave reflections upon the administration of the university" and these and the resignation of Prof. T. R. Glover, D.Litt. as a representative, were raised in Parliament as a pretext for a public inquiry on 1 May 1913. The inquiry was not authorised.

== Ripon ==
Hodgson completed her career in Yorkshire where she was vice principal at the Ripon and Wakefield and Bradford Diocesan Training College until her retirement to Bristol. The books she published during this period mainly had a religious theme and she was an active supporter of the Diocese of Ripon.

The poet, James Elroy Flecker's contributions and short life was described by Hodgson in 1925. She summarised his contribution in her book Life of James Elroy Flecker as "singular in our literature". This comment (and her book in general) received a damning review in the admittedly purposely combative The Calendar of Modern Letters; it is signed "BH" and was therefore probably written by Bertram Higgins.

Hodgson died in Clifton, Bristol in 1937.

== Works include ==
- Antony Delaval, LL.D., 1900
- Rama and the monkeys, 1903
- The life of the state, 1903
- Essays, Educational and literary
- Primitive Christian education, 1906
- The Teacher's Rabelais (Prepared by her in 1904)
- Across the forest and far away, 1911
- Studies in French Education from Rabelais to Rousseau, 1908
- Rationalist English educators, 1912
- In the Way of the Saints, 1913
- A Study in Illumination, after 1913
- The Teacher's Montaigne, 1915
- Criticism at a venture, 1919
- English Mystics, 1922
- Life of James Elroy Flecker, 1925
- (Richard) Rolle and "Our daily work, 1929
