= James Elroy Flecker =

British poet

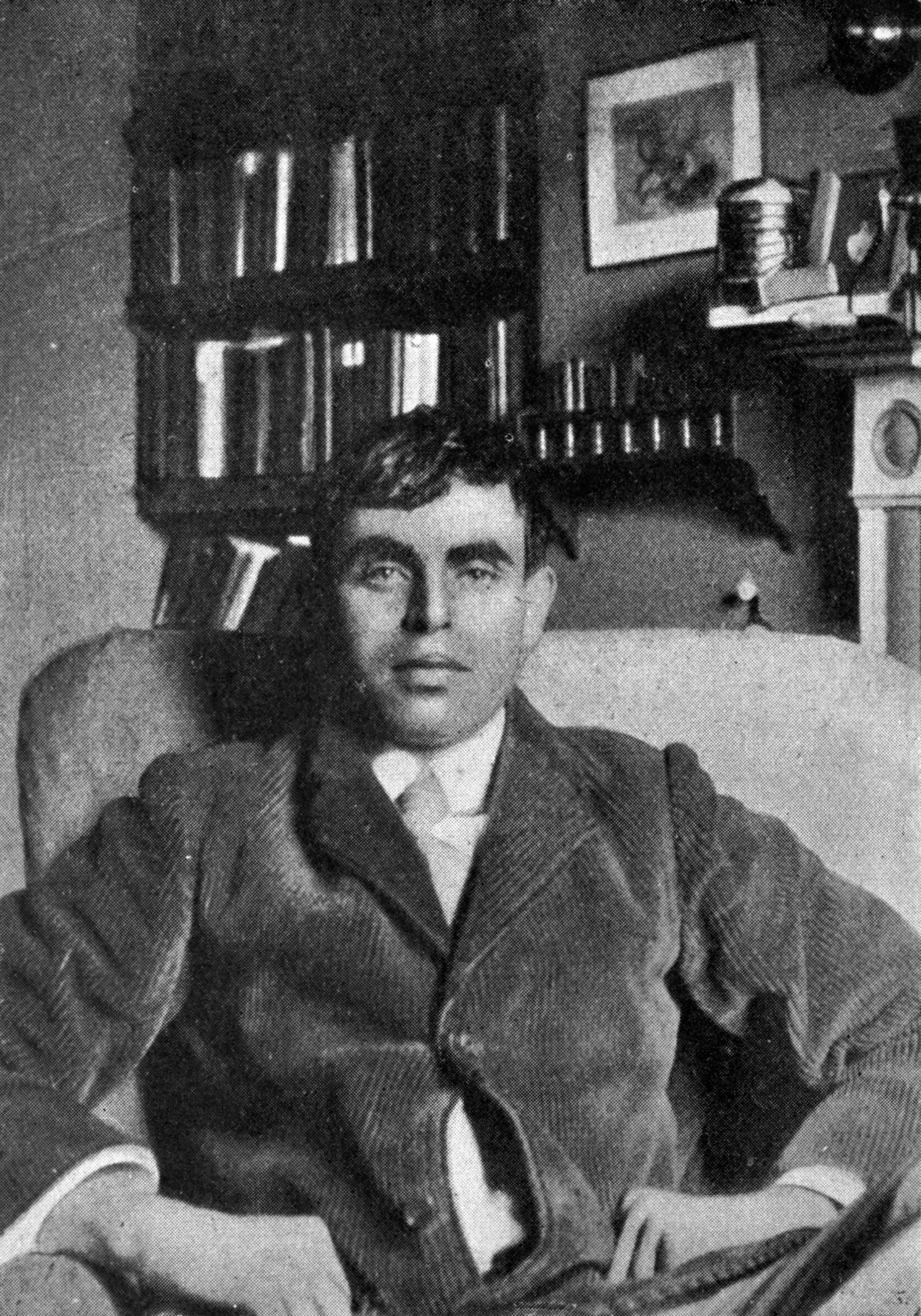
Flecker, in his rooms at Cambridge (circa 1905)

James Elroy Flecker (5 November 1884 – 3 January 1915) was a British novelist, playwright, and poet, whose poetry was most influenced by the Parnassian poets.

== Biography ==
His birthplace, 9 Gilmore Road, Lee, London, is marked with a blue plaque

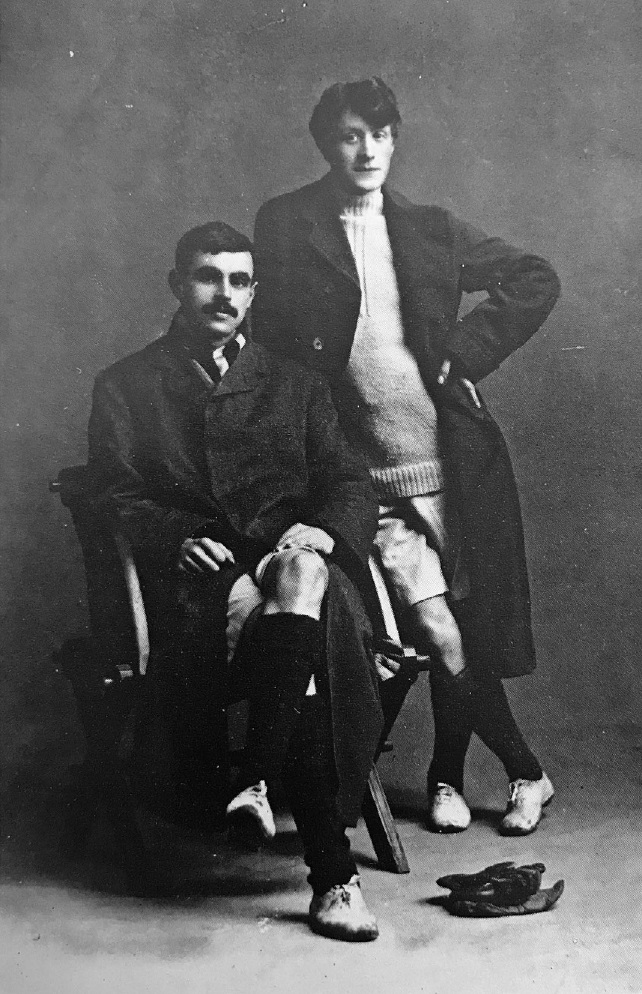
Flecker (sitting) and J. D. Beazley in 1908

Herman Elroy Flecker was born on 5 November 1884 in Lewisham, London, to William Herman Flecker, headmaster of Dean Close School in Cheltenham, and his wife Sarah. His much younger brother was the educationalist Henry Lael Oswald Flecker, who became headmaster of Christ's Hospital.

Flecker later chose to use the first name "James", either because he disliked the name "Herman" or to avoid confusion with his father. "Roy", as his family called him, was educated at Dean Close School, and then at Uppingham. He subsequently studied at Trinity College, Oxford, and at Gonville and Caius College, Cambridge. While at Oxford, he was greatly influenced by the last flowering of the Aesthetic movement there under John Addington Symonds, and became a close friend of the classicist and art historian John Beazley.

From 1908, Flecker worked in the consular service in the Eastern Mediterranean. On a ship to Athens, he met Hellé Skiadaressi, and they were married in 1911.

Flecker died on 3 January 1915, of tuberculosis, in Davos, Switzerland, and was buried in Bouncer's Lane Cemetery, Cheltenham. His death at the age of thirty was described at the time as "unquestionably the greatest premature loss that English literature has suffered since the death of Keats".

Hellé Flecker settled in England. She edited Flecker's Letters: Some Letters from Abroad of James Elroy Flecker, published by Heinemann in 1930 "with a few reminiscences by Hellé Flecker". In 1935, she was awarded a Civil List pension of £90 a year "in recognition of the services rendered by her husband to poetry". Hellé Flecker survived her husband for more than 45 years, dying in Sunbury-on-Thames in October 1961.

== Hassan ==
Flecker's poem The Golden Journey to Samarkand was published in 1913, but only found its larger context when his play, Hassan, was published.

Hassan (The Story of Hassan of Bagdad and How He Came to Make the Golden Journey to Samarkand) is a five-act drama in prose with verse passages. It tells the story of Hassan, a love-sick middle-aged confectioner of Baghdad who saves the Caliph Haroun ar Raschid from the King of the Beggars and is showered with riches in gratitude. However, horrified by witnessing the Caliph's capricious cruelty to a pair of lovers, he rejects the life of luxury and joins the caravan to Samarkand dressed as a pilgrim.

Hassan was not staged in Flecker’s lifetime, and was published posthumously in 1922. The play premiered in a sumptuous production directed by Basil Dean at His Majesty's Theatre, London on 20 September 1923. Henry Ainley played Hassan, with Leon Quartermaine, Malcolm Keen, Esme Percy, Cathleen Nesbitt, Basil Gill and Laura Cowie in the cast. The incidental music was by Frederick Delius and conducted by Eugène Goossens. The ballets were devised by Michel Fokine, and George W. Harris designed the sets and costumes. Delius was in the audience. Percy Fletcher conducted the music after the second performance, and recorded a selection of numbers from the production with the orchestra and chorus of His Majesty's Theatre in November 1923.

The production included incidental music, songs, dances, and choral episodes. It caught the fancy of English audiences at the time, perhaps because of the escape implied in its exotic setting and a post-war vogue for oriental imagery, and its wistful ending of death, by execution, and a hoped-for reunion and love in the afterlife, a theme that would have resonated for the survivors of the Great War, remembering those who died in the war. Delius's atmospheric music also contributed to the success of the production.

A scene from the 1923 production of Hassan

== Works and influence ==
Flecker's life and works were the subject of Life of James Elroy Flecker, a biography by Geraldine Hodgson published in 1925, relying on letters and other material provided by Flecker's mother. She summarised his contribution as "singular in our literature". However, this comment and her book received a damning review in The Calendar, which called it "sentimental and prudish ... conceited and irrelevant".

A character in the second volume of Anthony Powell's novel sequence, A Dance to the Music of Time, is said to be "fond of intoning" the lines "For lust of knowing what we should not know / We take the Golden Road to Samarkand", without an attribution to Flecker. (This is in fact a misquotation, the original reads "...what should not be known").

Saki's short story "A Defensive Diamond" (in Beasts and Super-Beasts, 1914) references "The Golden Journey to Samarkand".

Agatha Christie quotes Flecker several times, especially in her final novel, Postern of Fate (1973). "Pass not beneath, O Caravan, or pass not singing. Have you heard That silence where the birds are dead yet something pipeth like a bird?"

Jorge Luis Borges quotes a quatrain from Flecker's poem "To a Poet a Thousand Years Hence" in his essay "Note on Walt Whitman" (available in the collection Other Inquisitions, 1937–1952):

O friend unseen, unborn, unknown,
Student of our sweet English tongue,
Read out my words at night, alone:
I was a poet, I was young.

Nevil Shute quotes from Hassan in Marazan (1926), his first published novel, and in the headings of many of the chapters in his 1951 novel Round the Bend.

The Pilgrims' Song from Hassan and its setting by Delius play a pivotal role at the beginning of Elizabeth Goudge's novel The Castle on the Hill (1942).

Tracy Bond quotes an amended stanza from Hassan in the 1969 film On Her Majesty's Secret Service as she looks out of the window of Piz Gloria at the sun rising over the Swiss alps:

Thy dawn, O Master of the World, thy dawn;
For thee the sunlight creeps across the lawn,
For thee the ships are drawn down to the waves,
For thee the markets throng with myriad slaves,
For thee the hammer on the anvil rings,
For thee the poet of beguilement sings.

The original in Flecker's play is more romantic, and makes clear that the Caliph is being addressed, not the Almighty:

Thy dawn O Master of the world, thy dawn;
The hour the lilies open on the lawn,
The hour the grey wings pass beyond the mountains,
The hour of silence, when we hear the fountains,
The hour that dreams are brighter and winds colder,
The hour that young love wakes on a white shoulder,
O Master of the world, the Persian Dawn.

That hour, O Master, shall be bright for thee:
Thy merchants chase the morning down the sea,
The braves who fight thy war unsheathe the sabre,
The slaves who work thy mines are lashed to labour,
For thee the waggons of the world are drawn –
The ebony of night, the red of dawn!

In Flashman at the Charge (1973), author George MacDonald Fraser concludes a final scene with a decasyllable quatrain pastiche in Flecker’s style. Following many misadventures suffered by the book’s picaresque hero Harry Flashman, brother-in-arms rebel leader Yakub Beg waxes poetic and evokes the mystique of middle Asia with its concomitant voyage of self-discovery and friendships hard-won by reciting:

To learn the age-old lesson day by day:
It is not in the bright arrival planned,
But in the dreams men dream along the way,
They find the Golden Road to Samarkand.

Flecker's poem "The Bridge of Fire" features in Neil Gaiman's Sandman series, in the volume The Wake, and The Golden Journey to Samarkand is quoted in the volume World's End.

In Vikram Seth's A Suitable Boy, the young English Literature lecturer Dr Pran Kapoor attempts to reduce colonial influence in the syllabus and suggests removing Flecker (to make room for James Joyce). Professor Mishra disagrees and quotes from "The Gates of Damascus"

Pass not beneath, O Caravan, or pass not singing. Have you heard
That silence where the birds are dead yet something pipeth like a bird.

The excerpt from Flecker's verse drama Hassan ... the Golden Journey to Samarkand) inscribed on the clock tower of the barracks of the British Army's 22 Special Air Service Regiment in Herefordshire, provides an enduring testimony to Flecker's work:

We are the Pilgrims, master; we shall go
Always a little further; it may be
Beyond that last blue mountain barred with snow
Across that angry or that glimmering sea.

The same extract appears on the New Zealand Special Air Service monument at Rennie Lines in the Papakura Military Camp in New Zealand, and at the Indian Army's Special Forces Training School in Nahan, Himachal Pradesh, India. The extract also appears inside the sporting pavilion at Dean Close School, where Flecker was educated.

== Works ==
=== Poetry ===
- The Bridge of Fire (Elkin Matthews, 1907)
- Thirty-Six Poems (Adelphi Press, 1910)
- Forty-Two Poems (J. M. Dent & Sons, 1911) - a reissue of Thirty-Six Poems, with six new poems added. (Also as e-book and audio book) - 1924 edition bound with The Grecians (1910)
- The Golden Journey to Samarkand (1913)
- The Old Ships (The Poetry Bookshop, 1915) (as audio book)
- Collected Poems (Martin Secker; Doubleday, Page & Co., 1916)

=== Novels ===
- The Last Generation: A Story of the Future (New Age Press, 1908)
- The King of Alsander (George Allen & Unwin, 1914)

=== Drama ===
- Hassan (William Heinemann, 1922) Full title: Hassan: The Story of Hassan of Baghdad and How he Came to Make the Golden Journey to Samarkand. (Incidental music to the play was written by Frederick Delius in 1920, before the play's publication, and first performed in September 1923.)
- Don Juan (William Heinemann, 1925)

=== Other ===
- The Grecians: A Dialogue on Education (J. M. Dent & Sons; E. P. Dutton, 1910)
- The Scholars' Italian Book (1911)
- Collected Prose (G. Bell and Sons, 1920) - contains 'Tales and Sketches'; The Grecians; 'Critical Studies'.
- The Letters of J.E. Flecker to Frank Savery (The Beaumont Press, 1926)
- Some Letters from Abroad of James Elroy Flecker (William Heinemann, 1930)

== Sources ==
- James Elroy Flecker: an appreciation with some biographical notes (Chapman and Hall, 1922) by Douglas Goldring
- An Essay on Flecker (Doubleday Doran, 1937) by T. E. Lawrence (brief pamphlet)
- No Golden Journey: A Biography of James Elroy Flecker (1973) by John Sherwood
- James Elroy Flecker (Twayne Publishers, 1976) by John M. Munro (free registration required)
- Flecker and Delius - the making of 'Hassan' (Thames Publishing, 1978) by Dawn Redwood
- Hassan (1922) by James Elroy Flecker, Windmill Press, as reprinted 1946
