= Baron Marley =

Extinct barony in the Peerage of the United Kingdom

Baron Marley, of Marley in the County of Sussex, was a title in the Peerage of the United Kingdom. It was created on 16 January 1930 for the soldier and Labour politician Major Dudley Aman. He was succeeded by his only son, the second Baron. He was a film producer. Lord Marley was childless and the title became extinct on his death on 13 March 1990.

== Barons Marley (1930) ==
- Dudley Leigh Aman, 1st Baron Marley (1884–1952)
- Godfrey Pelham Leigh Aman, 2nd Baron Marley (1913–1990)
