= 1935 Liverpool West Derby by-election =

UK Parliamentary by-election

The 1935 Liverpool West Derby by-election was held on 6 July 1935. The by-election was held due to the death of the incumbent Conservative MP, John Sandeman Allen. It was won by the Conservative candidate David Maxwell Fyfe.
