= 1964 Faversham by-election =

UK Parliamentary by-election

The 1964 Faversham by-election was held on 14 May 1964 after the death of the incumbent Labour MP Percy Wells. The usually marginal seat was retained by the Labour Candidate Terence Boston.

Faversham by-election, 1964
| Party | Candidate | Votes | % | ±% |
|---|---|---|---|---|
| Labour | Terence Boston | 24,749 | 55.1 | +4.8 |
| Conservative | Elsie M. S. Olsen | 19,808 | 44.1 | −3.6 |
| Independent | Russell Eckley | 352 | 0.8 | New |
| Majority | | 4,941 | 11.0 | +10.5 |
| Turnout | | 44,909 | 74.8 | −9.0 |
| Labour hold | | Swing | +10.5 | |
