= John Sandeman Allen (Liverpool West Derby MP) =

British Conservative Party politician

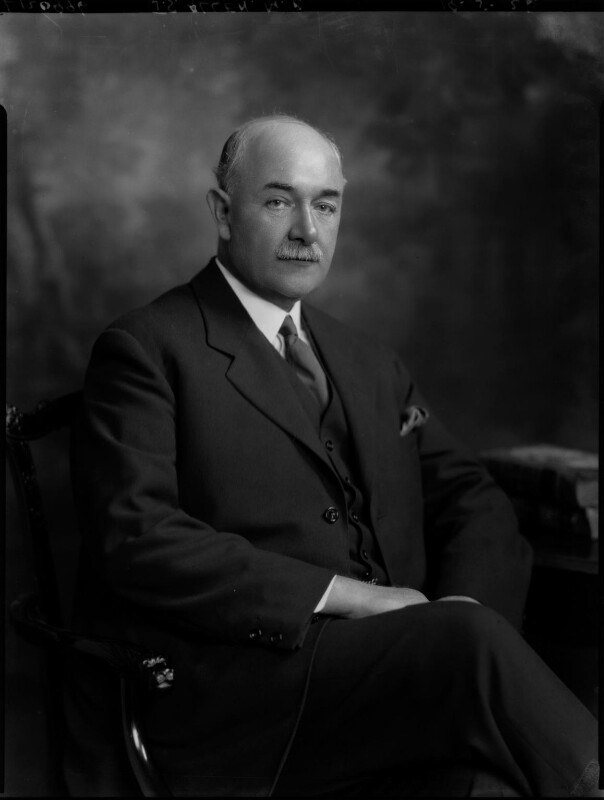
Sir John Sandeman Allen in 1926

Sir John Sandeman Allen (26 September 1865 – 3 June 1935) was a British Conservative Party politician. He was a Member of Parliament (MP) for Liverpool West Derby from 1924 until he died in office in 1935.

He was knighted in the 1928 Birthday Honours.

Parliament of the United Kingdom
| Preceded by Sydney Jones | Member of Parliament for Liverpool West Derby; 1924–1935 | Succeeded by David Maxwell Fyfe |
