= Sylvia Sackville, Countess De La Warr =

British public servant (1903-1992)

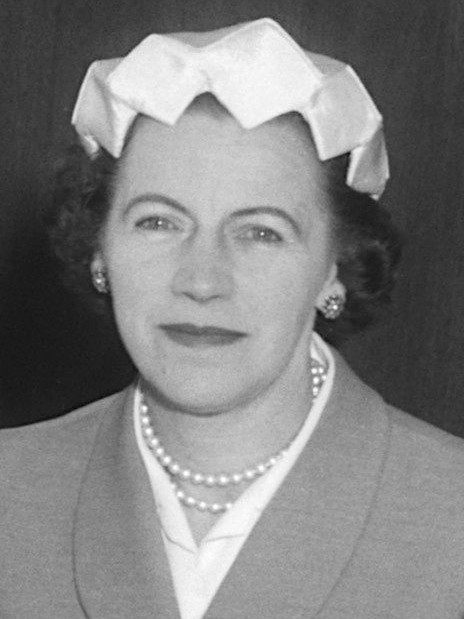
Kilmuir in 1958

Sylvia Margaret Sackville, Countess De La Warr, DBE (née Harrison; 16 July 1903 – 10 June 1992) was a British public servant and a former Vice Chairman of the Conservative Party (1951–54).

She was the second daughter of William Reginald Harrison, a cotton broker, and his wife, Edith, of Liverpool. Her younger brother, Reginald, grew up to become actor Sir Rex Harrison. She matched her brother for charm, while dedicating her life to the success of her husband, Sir David Maxwell Fyfe, whom she married in Liverpool in 1925. As well as caring for their three daughters, she provided wholehearted practical support throughout her husband’s political career, acting as his unofficial driver, and taking on his constituency business in Liverpool West Derby for the year he was away at the Nuremberg Trials. Letters between them exchanged during that time, formed the basis of a play by her grandson Tom Blackmore, Making History and later became the foundation of The Humans in the Telling a family project to commemorate the 75th anniversary of the Nuremberg Trials and 70th since the signing of the European Convention on Human Rights which charts her role in David Maxwell Fyfe's journey from Nuremberg to Strasbourg. The letters are now held at The Churchill Archive at Churchill College, Cambridge.

Her involvement in Liverpool constituency work continued, and in 1950 that work was recognised when she was asked to become one of the first women Vice-chair of the Conservative party, a position she held until 1954.

On her husband's ennoblement in October 1954 she became Viscountess Kilmuir, later Countess of Kilmuir (July 1962)

In 1957, she was appointed Dame Commander of the Order of the British Empire (DBE) She also became President of the Electrical Association for Women in 1957.

She was Vice-President of the Girls' Friendly Society and of the King George's Fund for Sailors, President of the Ladies Guild of the Gordon Smith Institute for Seamen, and later Chair of Governors at Rose Bruford Drama College and Patron of Chiddingstone Castle. She was appointed Chairman of the UK Committee of UNICEF.

== Marriages ==
1. David Maxwell Fyfe, 1st Earl of Kilmuir (1925–1967; his death), by whom she had three daughters, Lalage Fyfe (b. 1926, d. 1944) Pamela Maxwell Fyfe (b. 1928) later Wigram in 1950, then 26 October 1957 Blackmore, and Miranda Maxwell Fyfe (b. 1938, d. 2013) who became Cormack in 1960.
2. Herbrand Sackville, 9th Earl De La Warr (1 March 1968 – 28 January 1976; his death)

== Death ==
She died in East Hampshire on 10 June 1992, aged 88.
