= Rex Harrison =

English actor (1908–1990)

Sir Rex Harrison
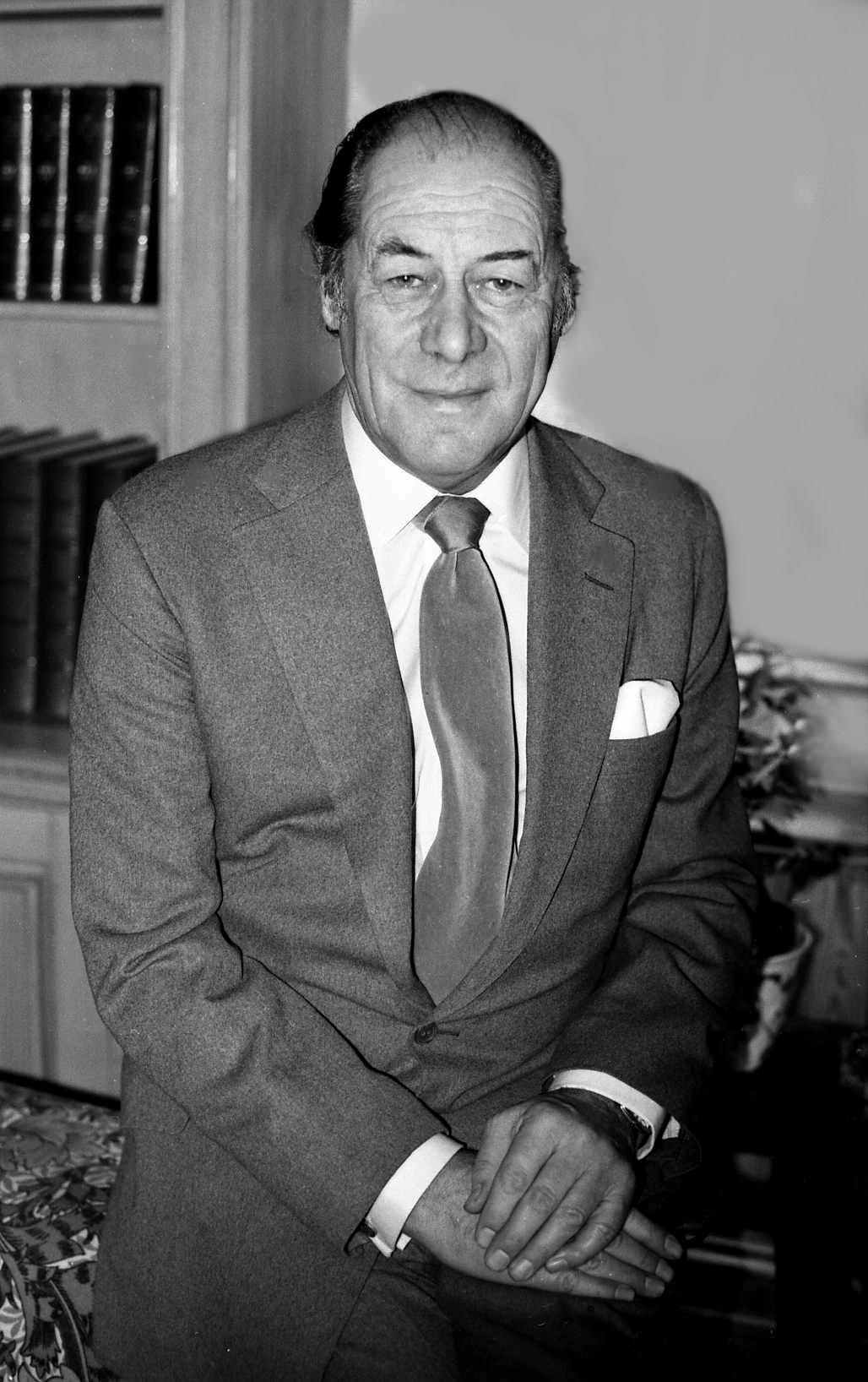
- Harrison at his home in London in 1976
- Born: Reginald Carey Harrison; 5 March 1908; Huyton, Lancashire, England
- Died: 2 June 1990 (aged 82); New York City, US
- Resting place: Ashes scattered in Portofino and Forest Lawn Memorial Park
- Education: Liverpool College
- Occupation: Actor
- Years active: 1924–1990
- Spouses: Ethel Margery Colette-Thomas (m. 1934; div. 1942); Lilli Palmer (m. 1943; div. 1957); Kay Kendall (m. 1957; died 1959); Rachel Roberts (m. 1962; div. 1971); Elizabeth Rees-Williams (m. 1971; div. 1975); Mercia Tinker (m. 1979)
- Children: Noel; Carey
- Relatives: Cathryn Harrison (granddaughter)

Sir Reginald Carey Harrison (5 March 1908 – 2 June 1990) was an English actor. Harrison began his career on the stage at the Liverpool Playhouse in 1924. He made his West End debut in 1936 appearing in the Terence Rattigan play French Without Tears, in what was his breakthrough role. He won his first Tony Award for Best Actor in a Play for his performance as Henry VIII in the Broadway play Anne of the Thousand Days in 1949. He returned to Broadway portraying Professor Henry Higgins in My Fair Lady (1956) where he won the Tony Award for Best Actor in a Musical.

In addition to his stage career, Harrison also appeared in numerous films. His first starring role opposite Vivien Leigh was in the romantic comedy Storm in a Teacup (1937). Receiving critical acclaim for his performance in Major Barbara (1941), which was shot in London during the Blitz, his roles since then included Blithe Spirit (1945), Anna and the King of Siam (1946), The Ghost and Mrs. Muir (1947), Cleopatra (1963), My Fair Lady (1964), reprising his stage role as Henry Higgins which won him an Academy Award for Best Actor, and the titular character in Doctor Dolittle (1967).

In 1975, Harrison released his first autobiography. In June 1989, he was knighted by Queen Elizabeth II. He was married six times and had two sons: Noel and Carey Harrison. He continued working in stage productions until shortly before his death from pancreatic cancer in June 1990 at the age of 82. His second autobiography, A Damned Serious Business: My Life in Comedy, was published posthumously in 1991.

== Early life ==
Reginald Carey Harrison was born on 5 March 1908 at Derry House in Huyton, Lancashire, the son of Edith Mary (née Carey) and William Reginald Harrison, a cotton broker. From the age of 10 he went by the name "Rex", which he adopted for himself. He was the youngest of three children and had two older sisters, Edith Marjorie Harrison and Sylvia Sackville, Countess De La Warr. He was educated at Birkdale preparatory school and Liverpool College. After a bout of childhood measles, Harrison lost most of the sight in his left eye. He showed an early desire to become an actor, with regular appearances in school plays, and visits to the Liverpool Playhouse.

== Stage career ==
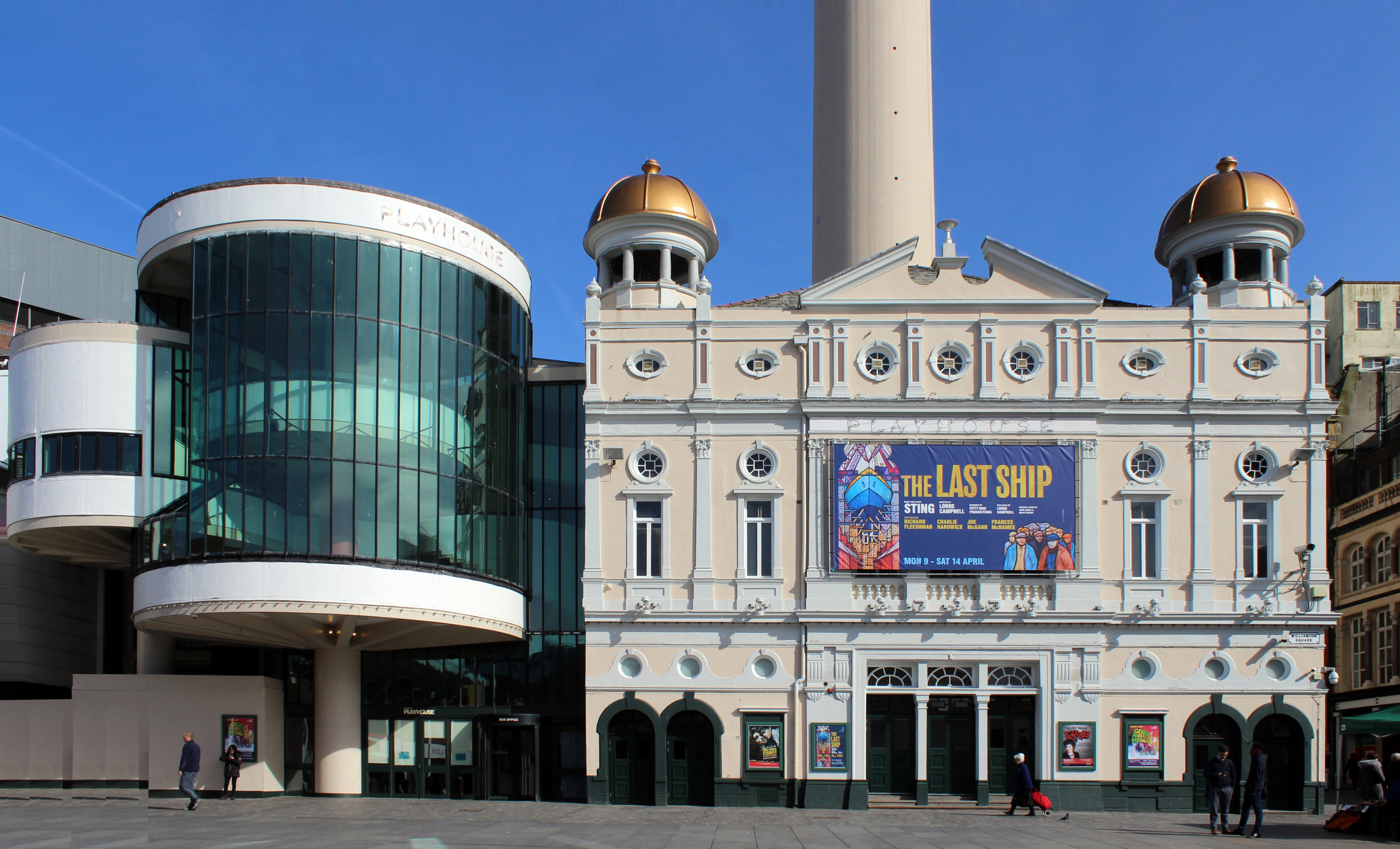
The Playhouse Theatre, Liverpool where Harrison made his stage debut in 1924

Harrison first appeared on stage in 1924 in Thirty Minutes in a Street at the Liverpool Playhouse, when he was 16 years old. He remained there, playing small parts, until 1927 when he joined a touring production of Charley's Aunt. Six years of touring and repertory followed. He achieved critical acclaim for Heroes Don't Care in 1936. His West End debut in the same year was in Terence Rattigan's French Without Tears which proved to be his breakthrough stage role as a leading light comedian. His acting career was interrupted by World War II, during which he served in the Royal Air Force (1942–1944), reaching the rank of Flight Lieutenant.

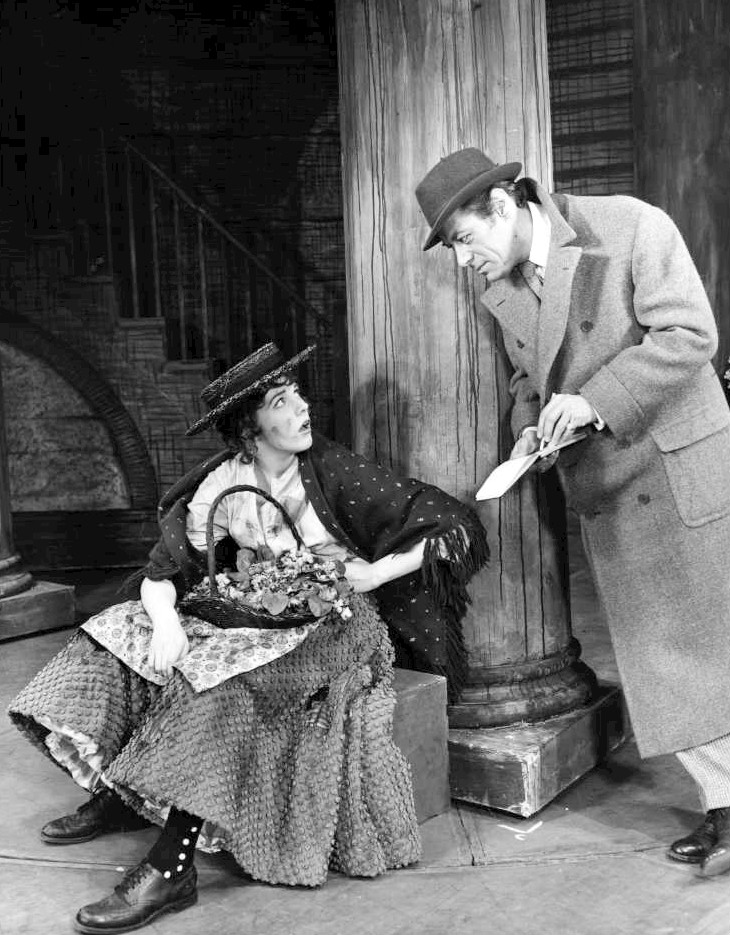
Harrison as Professor Henry Higgins alongside Julie Andrews as Eliza Doolittle in the musical My Fair Lady

He alternated appearances in London and New York in such plays as Bell, Book and Candle (1950), Venus Observed, The Cocktail Party, The Kingfisher and The Love of Four Colonels, which he also directed. He won his first Tony Award for his appearance at the Shubert Theatre as Henry VIII in Maxwell Anderson's play Anne of the Thousand Days and international superstardom (and a second Tony) for his portrayal of Henry Higgins in the 1956 stage musical My Fair Lady, where he appeared opposite Julie Andrews.

Later appearances included a 1984 appearance at the Haymarket Theatre with Claudette Colbert in Frederick Lonsdale's Aren't We All?, and one on Broadway at the Brooks Atkinson Theatre presented by Douglas Urbanski, at the Haymarket in J. M. Barrie's The Admirable Crichton with Edward Fox. He returned as Henry Higgins in the revival of My Fair Lady directed by Patrick Garland in 1981.

Having retired from films after A Time to Die in 1983, Harrison continued to act on Broadway and the West End until the end of his life, despite suffering from glaucoma, painful teeth, and a failing memory. Later roles included Julius Caesar in Caesar and Cleopatra, and General Burgoyne in a Los Angeles production of The Devil's Disciple. He was nominated for a third Tony Award in 1984 for his performance as Captain Shotover in the revival of George Bernard Shaw's Heartbreak House. He followed with two successful pairings with Claudette Colbert, The Kingfisher in 1985 and Aren't We All? in 1986. In 1989, he appeared with Edward Fox in The Admirable Crichton in London. In 1989/90, he appeared on Broadway in The Circle by W. Somerset Maugham, opposite Glynis Johns, Stewart Granger, and Roma Downey. The production opened at Duke University for a three-week run followed by performances in Baltimore and Boston before opening 14 November 1989 on Broadway.

== Film career ==
Harrison's film debut was in The Great Game (1930) and he had a bit part in The School for Scandal (1930).

He had support roles in Get Your Man (1934), Leave It to Blanche (1934), and All at Sea (1935), and a better part in Men Are Not Gods (1936) as a reporter in love with Miriam Hopkins; this was the first time Harrison worked for Alexander Korda.

=== Leading man ===
Harrison's first starring role was in the romantic comedy Storm in a Teacup (1937), opposite Vivien Leigh, for Korda. He starred in School for Husbands (1937) then reteamed with Leigh in St. Martin's Lane (1938).

Harrison had a key support role in The Citadel (1938) for MGM and starred in a comedy for Korda, Over the Moon (1939) alongside Merle Oberon. He starred in some thrillers: The Silent Battle (1939), Ten Days in Paris (1940) and Night Train to Munich (1940), the latter directed by Carol Reed and co starring Margaret Lockwood.

Harrison played Adolphus in Major Barbara (1941)—filmed in London during The Blitz of 1940, a role for which he received critical acclaim, and a success at the British box office. He was then absent from screens due to war service (1942–1944).

Harrison returned to films as the lead in Blithe Spirit (1945), from the play by Noël Coward, directed by David Lean. Coward described him as "The best light comedy actor in the world—except for me."

Harrison appeared opposite Anna Neagle in I Live in Grosvenor Square (1945) which was another big hit. Also popular was The Rake's Progress (1946), directed by Sidney Gilliat.

=== 20th Century Fox ===
Harrison received an offer from 20th Century Fox to star in Anna and the King of Siam (1946) in Hollywood. Harrison signed a long-term contract with Fox.

Anna was popular, as was The Ghost and Mrs. Muir (1947) with Gene Tierney and The Foxes of Harrow (1947) with Maureen O'Hara. Escape (1949) reunited Harrison with Joseph L. Mankiewicz who had made Ghost and Mrs Muir.

=== Return to England ===
Back in England, he appeared in The Long Dark Hall (1951) opposite his then wife Lilli Palmer. They co-starred in an adaptation of The Four Poster (1952).

In Hollywood, he made his first action film, the medieval epic King Richard and the Crusaders (1954) playing Saladin.

In England, Harrison was in The Constant Husband (1955) for Sidney Gilliat and British Lion. It was a hit at the box office.

=== America ===
Harrison was offered top billing in MGM's The Reluctant Debutante (1958) alongside his wife Kay Kendall.

He co-starred opposite Doris Day in Midnight Lace (1960) and Rita Hayworth in The Happy Thieves (1961).

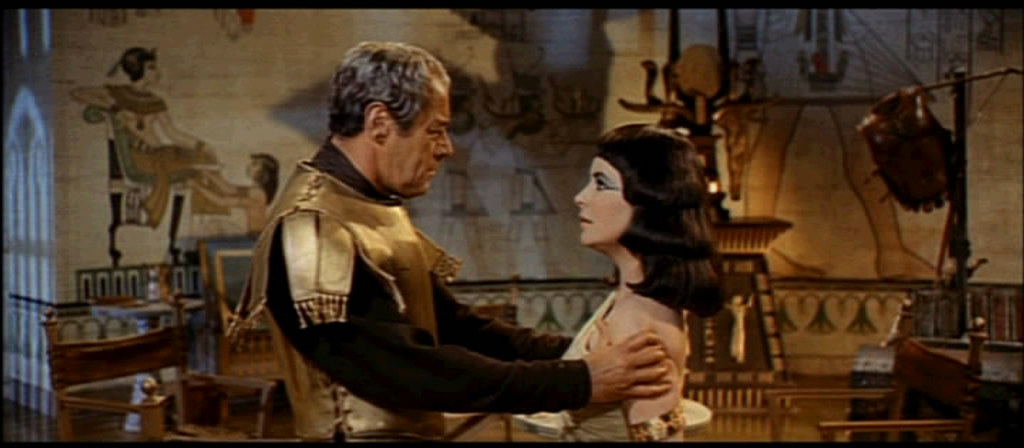
Harrison as Julius Caesar in Cleopatra (1963) for which he was nominated for an Academy Award

Harrison received an offer from Joseph L. Mankiewicz to play Julius Caesar in the 20th Century Fox epic Cleopatra (1963).

In 1964 Harrison reprised his 1956 stage performance as Henry Higgins in My Fair Lady, for which he won an Oscar for Best Actor.

He was one of several stars in the popular The Yellow Rolls-Royce (1964), and played the Pope opposite Charlton Heston in Fox's The Agony and the Ecstasy (1965), for Carol Reed.

Harrison starred in 1967's Doctor Dolittle. At the height of his box office fame after the success of My Fair Lady, Harrison proved a temperamental force during production, demanding auditions for prospective composers after musical playwright Leslie Bricusse was contracted and demanding to have his singing recorded live during shooting, only to agree to have it rerecorded in post-production. He also disrupted production by engaging in incidents with his then wife, Rachel Roberts, and through other deliberate misbehaviour, such as intentionally moving his yacht in front of cameras during shooting in St Lucia and refusing to move it out of sight, all prompted by contract disputes. Harrison was at one point temporarily replaced by Christopher Plummer, until he agreed to be more cooperative. Harrison was not by any objective standards a singer and the talking on pitch style he used in My Fair Lady was adopted by many other classically trained actors with limited vocal ranges; the music was written to allow for long periods of recitative, or "speaking to the music". Nevertheless "Talk to the Animals", which Harrison performed in Doctor Dolittle, won the Academy Award for Best Original Song in 1967. In a rare coincidence the very next year his son Noel Harrison sang the song that won the Academy Award for Best Original Song, "The Windmills of Your Mind."

Harrison reunited with Mankiewicz in The Honey Pot (1967), a modern adaptation of Ben Jonson's play Volpone. Two of his co-stars, Maggie Smith and Cliff Robertson, were to become lifelong friends. Both spoke at his New York City memorial at the Little Church Around the Corner when he died in 1990.

Harrison made two more films for 20th Century Fox, both expensive play adaptations that failed at the box office: A Flea in Her Ear (1968), and Staircase (1969).

=== Later film career ===
After a break from screen acting, Harrison appeared in The Prince and The Pauper (1977) and a Hindi film, Shalimar, alongside Indian Bollywood stars Dharmendra and Zeenat Aman. He had small roles in Ashanti (1979), The Fifth Musketeer (1979) and A Time to Die (shot 1979), his last film.

== Personal life ==
Alexander Walker wrote: "in looks and temperament, Rex went back to the Elizabethans. They would have called him 'a man of passionate parts'. His physique and looks were far more striking once middle age had literally stretched too smooth and callow a youthful face into a long, saturnine physiognomy, whose hooded eyes and wide mouth had satyr-like associations for some people."

Harrison was married six times. In 1942, he divorced his first wife, Noel Margery Colette Thomas, and married actress Lilli Palmer the next year; they later appeared together in numerous plays and films, including The Four Poster. Whilst married to Palmer, he built a villa at Portofino, San Genesio, where over the years he hosted showbiz royalty including Laurence Olivier, Vivien Leigh and John Gielgud and real royalty, the Duke of Windsor and his wife the Duchess.

In 1947, while married to Palmer, Harrison began an affair with actress Carole Landis. Landis took her own life in 1948 after spending the evening with Harrison. Harrison's involvement in the scandal by waiting several hours before calling a doctor and police briefly damaged his career and his contract with Fox was ended by mutual consent.

In 1955, Harrison starred opposite Kay Kendall in The Constant Husband, and they had an affair. When he learned that Kendall had been diagnosed with myeloid leukaemia, he and Palmer agreed to divorce so that he could marry Kendall and provide for her care. Harrison and Palmer divorced in 1957 and he married Kendall the same year. Kendall died of myeloid leukaemia in 1959. Terence Rattigan's 1973 play In Praise of Love was written about the end of this marriage, and Harrison appeared in the New York production playing the character based on himself. Rattigan was said to be "intensely disappointed and frustrated" by Harrison's performance, as "Harrison refused to play the outwardly boorish parts of the character and instead played him as charming throughout, signalling to the audience from the start that he knew the truth about [the] illness." Critics, however, were quite pleased with the performance and although it did not have a long run it was yet another of Harrison's well-plotted naturalistic performances.

He was subsequently married to Welsh actress Rachel Roberts from 1962 to 1971. Harrison then married Welsh socialite Elizabeth Rees-Williams, divorcing in 1975; finally, in 1978, he married Mercia Ryhiner Schwob Tinker, his sixth and final wife. In 1980, despite his having married twice since their divorce, Roberts made a final attempt to win Harrison back, which proved to be futile; she took her own life that same year.

Harrison's elder son, Noel Harrison, became an Olympic skier, singer and occasional actor; he toured in several productions including My Fair Lady in his father's award-winning role; Noel died suddenly of a heart attack on 19 October 2013 at age 79. Rex's younger son, Carey Harrison, was a playwright and social activist. He died of a heart attack on 22 January 2025, at age 80.

Harrison's sister Sylvia was married to David Maxwell Fyfe, 1st Earl of Kilmuir, a lawyer, Conservative politician and judge who was successively the lead British prosecutor at Nuremberg, Home Secretary and Lord Chancellor (head of the English judiciary); after his death she married another Cabinet minister, Herbrand Sackville, 9th Earl De La Warr.

Chronology of Harrison's six marriages:

- Noel M Colette-Thomas, 1934–1942 (divorced); one son, the actor/singer Noel Harrison, (29 January 1934 – 19 October 2013)
- Lilli Palmer, 1943–1957 (divorced); one son, the novelist/playwright Carey Harrison (19 February 1944 – 22 January 2025).
- Kay Kendall, 1957–1959 (her death)
- Rachel Roberts, 1962–1971 (divorced)
- Elizabeth Rees-Williams, 1971–1975 (divorced)
- Mercia Ryhiner Schwob Tinker, 1978–1990 (his death)

Grandchildren:

- Granddaughters: Cathryn, Harriott, Chloe, Chiara, Rosie, Faith
- Grandsons: Will, Simon, Sam

Harrison owned properties in London, New York City and Portofino, Italy. His villa in Portofino was named San Genesio after the patron saint of actors.

== Death ==
Harrison died from the effects of pancreatic cancer at his home in Manhattan, New York City, on 2 June 1990 at the age of 82. He had been diagnosed with the disease only a short time before. The stage production in which he was appearing at the time, The Circle, came to an end upon his death. His body was cremated and his ashes were scattered in Portofino.

Harrison's second autobiography, A Damned Serious Business: My Life in Comedy, was published posthumously in 1991.

== Acting credits ==
=== Film ===
| Year | Title | Role | Notes |
|---|---|---|---|
| 1930 | The Great Game | George | |
| 1930 | The School for Scandal | Bit Part | Uncredited |
| 1934 | Get Your Man | Tom Jakes | |
| 1934 | Leave It to Blanche | Ronnie | |
| 1935 | All at Sea | Aubrey Bellingham | |
| 1936 | Men Are Not Gods | Tommy Stapleton | |
| 1937 | Storm in a Teacup | Frank Burdon | |
| 1937 | School for Husbands | Leonard Drummond | |
| 1938 | Sidewalks of London | Harley Prentiss | aka St. Martin's Lane |
| 1938 | The Citadel | Dr. Frederick Lawford | |
| 1939 | Over the Moon | Dr. Freddie Jarvis | |
| 1939 | The Silent Battle | Jacques Sauvin | |
| 1940 | Ten Days in Paris | Bob Stevens | |
| 1940 | Night Train to Munich | Gus Bennett / "Dickie Randall" | |
| 1941 | Major Barbara | Adolphus Cusins | |
| 1945 | Blithe Spirit | Charles Condomine | |
| 1945 | I Live in Grosvenor Square | Major David Bruce | |
| 1945 | Journey Together | Guest | Uncredited |
| 1945 | The Rake's Progress | Vivian Kenway | |
| 1946 | Anna and the King of Siam | King Mongkut | |
| 1947 | The Ghost and Mrs. Muir | Captain Daniel Gregg | |
| 1947 | The Foxes of Harrow | Stephen Fox | |
| 1948 | Escape | Matt Denant | |
| 1948 | Unfaithfully Yours | Sir Alfred De Carter | |
| 1951 | The Long Dark Hall | Arthur Groome | |
| 1952 | The Four Poster | John Edwards | |
| 1953 | Main Street to Broadway | Himself | |
| 1954 | King Richard and the Crusaders | Emir Hderim Sultan Saladin | |
| 1955 | The Constant Husband | William Egerton | |
| 1958 | The Reluctant Debutante | Jimmy Broadbent | |
| 1960 | Midnight Lace | Anthony "Tony" Preston | |
| 1961 | The Happy Thieves | Jimmy Bourne | |
| 1963 | Cleopatra | Julius Caesar | |
| 1964 | My Fair Lady | Professor Henry Higgins | |
| 1964 | The Yellow Rolls-Royce | Lord Charles Frinton – The Marquess of Frinton | |
| 1965 | The Agony and the Ecstasy | Pope Julius II | |
| 1967 | The Honey Pot | Cecil Sheridan Fox | |
| 1967 | Doctor Dolittle | Dr. John Dolittle | |
| 1968 | A Flea in Her Ear | Victor Chandebisse / Poche | |
| 1969 | Staircase | Charles Dyer | |
| 1977 | Crossed Swords | The Duke of Norfolk | |
| 1978 | Shalimar | Sir John Locksley | |
| 1979 | Ashanti | Brian Walker | |
| 1979 | The Fifth Musketeer | Colbert | |
| 1982 | A Time to Die | Van Osten | |

=== Television ===
| Year | Title | Role | Notes |
|---|---|---|---|
| 1952 | Omnibus | Henry VIII | Episode: The Trial of Anne Boleyn |
| 1953 | The United States Steel Hour | Raymond Dabney | Episode: The Man in Possession |
| 1957 | DuPont Show of the Month | Mr. Sir | Episode: Crescendo |
| 1960 | Dow Hour of Great Mysteries | Cyril Paxton | Episode: The Dachet Diamonds |
| 1971–1973 | Play of the Month | Mikhail Platonov, schoolmaster Don Quixote | 2 episodes |
| 1974 | Rex Harrison Presents Stories of Love | Host, himself | Pilot-Television film |
| 1983 | The Kingfisher | Cecil | Television film |
| 1985 | Heartbreak House | Captain Shotover | Television film |
| 1986 | Anastasia: The Mystery of Anna | Grand Duke Cyril Romanov | Television film, (final film role) |

=== Theatre ===
| Date | Production | Role | Venue |
|---|---|---|---|
| 4–25 March 1936 | Sweet Aloes | Tubbs Barrow | |
| 6 November 1936 | French Without Tears | Alan Howard | |
| 8 December 1948 – 8 October 1949 | Anne of the Thousand Days | Henry | |
| 14 November 1950 – 2 June 1951 | Bell, Book and Candle | Shepherd Henderson | |
| 13 February – 26 April 1952 | Venus Observed | Hereward | |
| 15 January – 16 May 1953 | The Love of Four Colonels | The Man | |
| 15 March 1956 – 29 September 1962 | My Fair Lady | Henry Higgins | |
| 8 December 1959 – 20 February 1960 | The Fighting Cock | The General | |
| 28 March – 28 April 1973 | The Living Mask | Henry IV | |
| 10 December 1974 – 31 May 1975 | In Praise of Love | Sebastian Cruttwell | |
| 1976 | Monsieur Perichon's Travels | Eugène Labiche & Edouard Martin | |
| 24 February – 5 March 1977 | Caesar and Cleopatra | Julius Caesar | |
| 6 December 1978 – 13 May 1979 | The Kingfisher | Cecil | |
| 16 September 1980 – 29 November 1981 | My Fair Lady | Henry Higgins | |
| 7 December 1983 – 5 February 1984 | Heartbreak House | Captain Shotover | |
| 29 April – 21 July 1985 | Aren't We All? | Lord Grenham | |
| 20 November 1989 – 20 May 1990 | The Circle | Lord Porteous | |

=== Radio ===
| Year | Title | Role | Notes |
|---|---|---|---|
| 1951 | The Private Files of Rex Saunders | Main Role | |
| 1952 | Philip Morris Playhouse | | Episode: The Gioconda Smile |
| 1952 | Theatre Guild on the Air | | Episode: An Ideal Husband |
| 1953 | Star Playhouse | No Time for Comedy | |
| 1953 | Star Playhouse | Twentieth Century | |

== Honours and legacy ==
| Year | Award | Category | Nominated work | Result | Ref. |
|---|---|---|---|---|---|
| 1963 | Academy Awards | Best Actor | Cleopatra | Nominated | |
| 1964 | Academy Awards | Best Actor | My Fair Lady | Won | |
| 1965 | British Academy Film Awards | Best British Actor | My Fair Lady | Nominated | |
| 1965 | David di Donatello Awards | Best Foreign Actor | My Fair Lady | Won | |
| 1984 | Drama Desk Awards | Outstanding Actor in a Play | Heartbreak House | Nominated | |
| 1985 | Drama Desk Awards | Special Award | | Won | |
| 1963 | Golden Globe Awards | Best Actor in a Motion Picture – Drama | Cleopatra | Nominated | |
| 1964 | Golden Globe Awards | Best Actor in a Motion Picture – Musical or Comedy | My Fair Lady | Won | |
| 1966 | Golden Globe Awards | World Film Favorite – Male | | Won | |
| 1966 | Golden Globe Awards | Best Actor in a Motion Picture – Drama | The Agony and the Ecstasy | Nominated | |
| 1968 | Golden Globe Awards | Best Actor in a Motion Picture – Musical or Comedy | Doctor Dolittle | Nominated | |
| 1983 | Laurence Olivier Awards | Actor of the Year | Heartbreak House | Nominated | |
| 1963 | National Board of Review Awards | Best Actor | Cleopatra | Won | |
| 1946 | New York Film Critics Circle Awards | Best Actor | Anna and the King of Siam | Nominated | |
| 1964 | New York Film Critics Circle Awards | Best Actor | My Fair Lady | Won | |
| 1949 | Tony Awards | Best Actor in a Play | Anne of a Thousand Days | Won | |
| 1957 | Tony Awards | Best Leading Actor in a Musical | My Fair Lady | Won | |
| 1969 | Tony Awards | Special Tony Award | | Won | |
| 1984 | Tony Awards | Best Leading Actor in a Play | Heartbreak House | Nominated | |

- On 17 June 1989, Harrison was knighted by Queen Elizabeth II at Buckingham Palace.
- Rex Harrison has two stars on the Hollywood Walk of Fame, one at 6906 Hollywood Boulevard for his contribution to films, and the other at 6380 Hollywood Boulevard for his contribution to television. Harrison is also a member of the American Theater Hall of Fame. He was inducted in 1979.

== Recognition ==
Seth MacFarlane, creator of the American animated series Family Guy, modelled the voice of the character Stewie Griffin after Harrison, after seeing him in the film adaptation of My Fair Lady.

Ex-CIA chief of disguise Jonna Mendez stated in 2019 that a mask of Harrison was used by multiple CIA agents for covert work. The moulds of his face were larger and so could fit over a smaller agent's face. The moulds were made from aluminium and bought from Hollywood film facilities. She mentioned that his likeness was "taking part in a lot of operations". According to Mendez, Rex Harrison's aluminium facial props mould was used as a baseline for over-the-head masks that the agency would create and use operationally. The masks came in small, medium and large sizes, with Rex's mould becoming the agency's standard "large" size. Subsequently, many undercover operatives' real identities were disguised by masks bearing Rex's facial features.

== See also ==
- List of British actors
- List of Academy Award winners and nominees from Great Britain
- List of actors with Academy Award nominations

== Sources ==
- Donnelley, Paul (2003). Fade To Black: A Book Of Movie Obituaries (2nd ed.). Omnibus Press. ISBN 978-0-7119-9512-3.
- Fleming, E. J. (2004). The Fixers: Eddie Mannix, Howard Strickling, and The MGM Publicity Machine. McFarland. ISBN 978-0-7864-2027-8.
- Golden, Eve; Kendall, Kim Elizabeth (2002). The Brief, Madcap Life of Kay Kendall. University Press of Kentucky. ISBN 978-0-8131-2251-9.
- Hadleigh, Boze (2001). The Lavender Screen: The Gay and Lesbian Films – Their Stars, Directors, and Critics (3rd ed.). Citadel Press. ISBN 978-0-8065-2199-2.
- Harris, Mark (2008). Pictures at a Revolution: Five Movies and the Birth of the New Hollywood. Penguin Press. ISBN 978-0-143-11503-8.
- Harrison, Rex (1975). Rex: An Autobiography. William Morrow. ISBN 978-0-688-02881-7.
- Parish, James Robert (2007). The Hollywood Book of Extravagance: The Totally Infamous, Mostly Disastrous, and Always Compelling Excesses of America's Film and TV Idols. John Wiley and Sons. ISBN 978-0-470-05205-1.
- Wapshott, Nicholas (1991). Rex Harrison: A Biography (1st ed.). Chatto & Windus. ISBN 978-0-701-13764-9.
