= Roger Moate =

British politician

Sir Roger Denis Moate (12 May 1938 – 15 April 2019) was a Conservative politician in the United Kingdom.

== Biography ==
Moate was educated at Latymer Upper School, Hammersmith and was an insurance broker. He first stood for Parliament for the Faversham constituency at the 1966 general election, losing to Labour's Terence Boston. When the Redcliffe-Maud Report was campaigned against by rural district councils, Swale R.D.C. was forced to opt out of the campaign due to the similarity of "R.E. Mote" with its then-prospective candidate R. D. Moate. By coincidence, Moate had moved the motion opposing Redcliffe-Maud at the Conservative Party conference. He was elected Member of Parliament for Faversham at the 1970 general election, and served as MP until 1997. He was a member of the select committee on Agriculture from 1995 to 1997.

Moate was a staunch Eurosceptic who had opposed Britain's entry into the European Economic Community in the early 1970s and who kept a 'roll of honour' of the 41 Conservative MPs who had voted against joining the EEC in 1971. He was still hostile to the EEC in the early 1990s, becoming one of the 'Maastricht Rebels' who repeatedly voted against the Government's attempts to ratify the Maastricht Treaty.

At the 1997 election, the Faversham constituency was split to form Faversham and Mid Kent and Sittingbourne and Sheppey. Moate contested the latter seat, but lost to the Labour candidate, Derek Wyatt. Meanwhile, the former seat was retained for the Conservatives.

Moate was knighted in 1993 and lived in Newnham, near Sittingbourne, before moving to Faversham, where he died at home from cancer in April 2019, aged 80. He was married twice and had three children.

Parliament of the United Kingdom
Preceded by Terence Boston	Member of Parliament for Faversham; 1970 – 1997	Constituency abolished
