= Terrot R. Glover =

British classical philologist and author

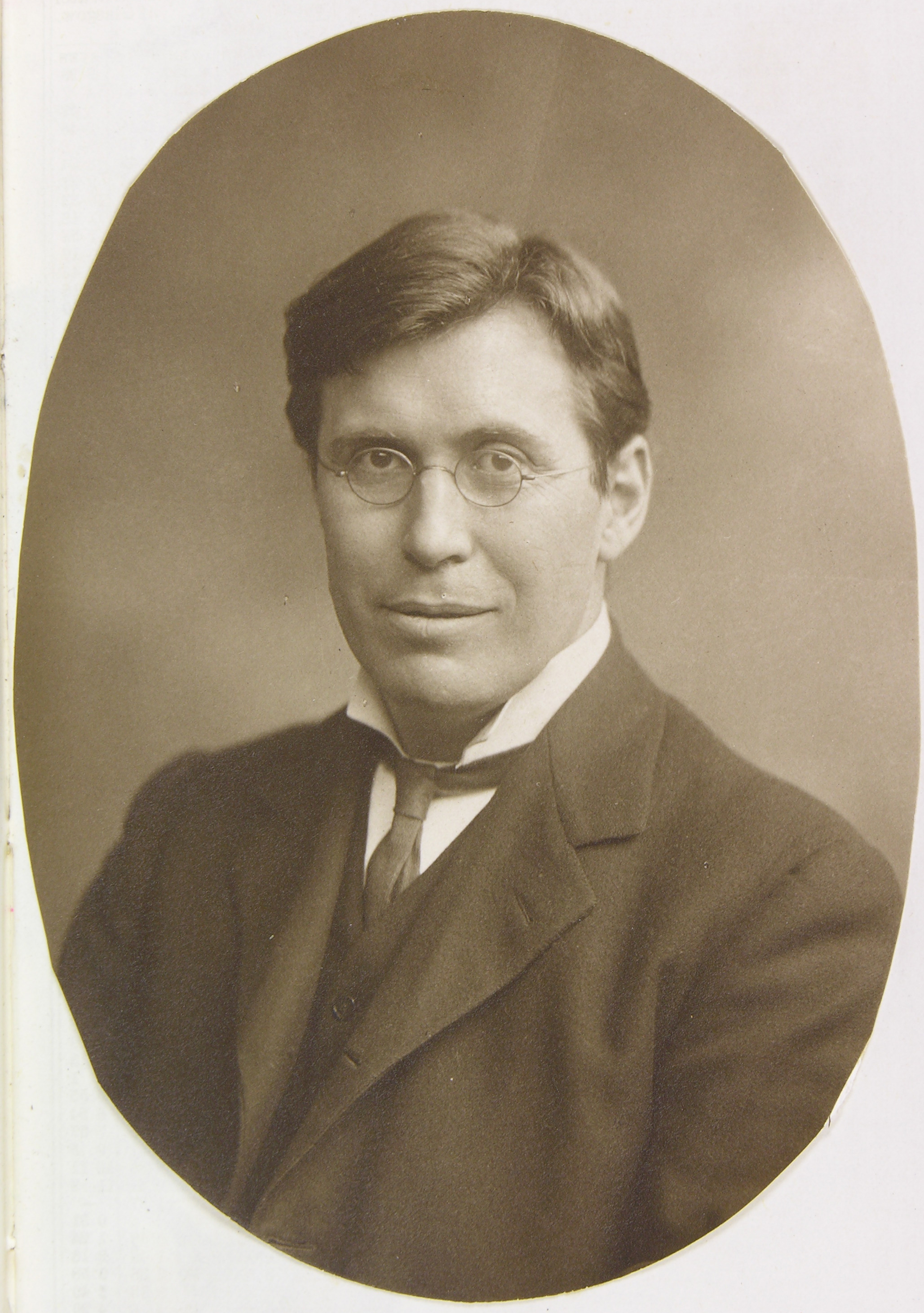
Terrot R. Glover in 1909

Terrot Reaveley Glover (23 July 1869 – 26 May 1943) was a lecturer of classical literature. He was a Latinist, and is known for translating Robert Louis Stevenson's A Child's Garden of Verses to Latin.

== Life ==
Glover was born in Bristol where his father, the Rev. Richard Glover, was minister of Tyndale Baptist Church. He was educated at Bristol Grammar School and St John's College, Cambridge, where he read classics. He was then made a fellow of St John's and Professor of Latin at Queen’s University, Kingston, in Ontario, Canada, before becoming a lecturer in classics and, later on, Public Orator at the University of Cambridge until his retirement in 1939 (when he was succeeded in the latter role by W. K. C. Guthrie). Glover also wrote books, including The Jesus of History and Poets and Puritans.

He was a representative of Cambridge University at University College, Bristol, until he resigned. Hansard records that his resignation and the opinions of Geraldine Hodgson and Professor Gerothwohl concerning "grave reflections upon the administration of the university" were raised in Parliament as a pretext for a Public Enquiry on 1 May 1913. The enquiry was not authorised.

Glover was a Baptist and attended St Andrews Street Baptist Church in Cambridge, where his friend Melbourn Aubrey was minister until 1925. Aubrey recalled that for Glover "the Old Testament came to have less and less value and in his last years he appeared to resent ministers taking texts or even lessons from it." Glover had six children. He conducted services in Appleton chapel at Harvard University on 19 December 1923 while visiting the university.

== Selected bibliography ==
- Life and Letters in the Fourth Century, Cambridge: Cambridge University Press. (1901)
- Studies in Virgil, London: E. Arnold. (1904) - 4th ed. 1920
- The Conflict of Religions in the Early Roman Empire, London: Methuen & Co. (1909) - 3d ed.
- The Nature and Purpose of a Christian Society, London: Headley Bros.; New York: George H. Doran Company. (1912)
- The Christian Tradition and its Verification, London: Methuen & Co. (1912) - 4th ed. 1917
- Poets and Puritans, London: Methuen & Co. (1915)
- The Jesus of History, London: Student Christian Movement; New York: Association Press. (1917)
- From Pericles to Philip, New York: The Macmillan Company. (1917)
- The Pilgrim: Essays on Religion, London: Student Christian Movement. (1921)
- Jesus in the Experience of Men, New York: Association Press. (1921)
- Progress in Religion to the Christian Era, London: Student Christian Movement. (1922)
- Herodotus, Berkeley, Calif.: The University of California Press. (1924)
- The Influence of Christ in the Ancient World, Cambridge: Cambridge University Press. (1929)
- The World of the New Testament, Cambridge: Cambridge University Press. (1931)
- Apology: De spectaculis, Cambridge, Mass.: Harvard University Press. (1931) - Tertullian, c. 160-ca. 230.; with Marcus Minucius Felix
- Horace: A Return to Allegiance, Cambridge: Cambridge University Press. (1932)
- Democracy and Religion..., Sackville: N. B., Mount Allison University. (1932)
- The Ancient World: A Beginning, New York: The Macmillan Company. (1935)
- Paul of Tarsus, London: Student Christian Movement. (1938)
- Disciple, Cambridge: Cambridge University Press. (1942)
- The Challenge of the Greek and other Essays, Cambridge: Cambridge University Press. (1942)
- Cambridge Retrospect, Cambridge: Cambridge University Press. Disciple Cambridge: Cambridge University Press. (1943)
- Springs of Hellas and other Essays, Cambridge: Cambridge University Press. (1945)

Academic offices
Preceded by Sir John Edwin Sandys	Cambridge University Orator; 1920–1939	Succeeded by William Keith Chambers Guthrie
