= Frederic Gorell Barnes =

British barrister and politician (1856–1939)

Sir Frederic Gorell Barnes
- Barnes in 1898

Member of Parliament for Faversham
- In office 1895–1900
- Preceded by: Herbert Knatchbull-Hugessen
- Succeeded by: John Howard

Personal details
- Born: 1856 Mossley Hill, Merseyside, England
- Died: 17 March 1939 (aged 82–83)
- Party: Conservative
- Education: Jesus College, Cambridge

Sir Frederic Gorell Barnes, JP, DL, FRGS (1856 – 17 March 1939) was a British barrister and politician.

A first cousin of the judge Lord Gorell, he was born in Mossley Hill, Barnes was educated at the Royal Institution of Liverpool and Jesus College, Cambridge. He was called to the bar at the Inner Temple in 1885 and joined the Northern Circuit. He also became a Justice of the Peace, a deputy lieutenant of Kent, and a Fellow of the Royal Geographical Society.

Barnes stood unsuccessfully for the Conservative Party in North East Derbyshire at the 1892 UK general election, then won Faversham at the 1895 UK general election. He did not contest any seat at the 1900 UK general election, but stood unsuccessfully in Northampton at the 1906 and January 1910 general elections.

Barnes was awarded a knighthood in 1916, and from 1917 to 1921 worked for the Ministry of Food. He also served as a vice president of the Tariff Reform League.
