= John Howard (MP for Faversham) =

British Member of Parliament for Faversham

Member of Parliament for Faversham
- In office 1900–1906
- Preceded by: Frederic Gorell Barnes
- Succeeded by: Thomas Bateman Napier

Personal details
- Born: 1863
- Died: 5 September 1911 (aged 47–48)
- Party: Conservative
- Spouse: Emily Violet (m. 1896)
- Children: 1

John Howard (1863 – 5 September 1911) was Conservative MP for Faversham. He was returned unopposed in 1900, but lost to the Liberals in 1906.

He was a major in the Royal East Kent Yeomanry.

He married in 1896 the Hon. Emily Violet, daughter of Carnegie Robert John Jervis, 3rd Viscount St Vincent and widow of William Hargrave Pawson of Shawdon; they had one son.

== Sources ==
- Craig, F.W.S. British Parliamentary Election Results 1885-1918
- Whitaker's Almanack, 1901 to 1907 editions
- Leigh Rayment's Historical List of MPs
