= Terence Boston, Baron Boston of Faversham =

British politician

The Right Honourable The Lord Boston of Faversham QC

Minister of State for Home Affairs
- In office 3 January 1979 – 4 May 1979
- Monarch: Elizabeth II
- Prime Minister: James Callaghan
- Preceded by: The Lord Harris of Greenwich
- Succeeded by: Leon Brittan

Member of the House of Lords
- Lord Temporal
- Life peerage 1 July 1976 – 23 July 2011

Member of Parliament for Faversham
- In office 15 May 1964 – 29 May 1970
- Preceded by: Percy Wells
- Succeeded by: Sir Roger Moate

Personal details
- Born: 21 March 1930
- Died: 23 July 2011 (aged 81)
- Party: Labour
- Spouse: Margaret Head (m. 1963)
- Education: King's College, London

Terence George Boston, Baron Boston of Faversham, QC (21 March 1930 – 23 July 2011) was a British Labour Party politician.

== Early life ==
Boston was born on 21 March 1930, the son of George Boston and his wife, Kate Boston (née Bellati). He was educated at Woolwich Polytechnic School for Boys located in the Royal Borough of Greenwich, London. On 4 October 1951, as part of National Service, he was commissioned into the Royal Air Force as a pilot officer. He was given the service number 2501206. He then began studying at King's College London where he joined the University Air Squadron, and transferred to the Royal Air Force Volunteer Reserve, on 3 October 1952. He was promoted to flying officer on 6 April 1954. He graduated with a Bachelor of Laws (LLB) in 1954. He was called to the bar at Inner Temple in 1960. He was promoted to flight lieutenant on 6 April 1960.

== Political career ==
He was elected as member of parliament (MP) for Faversham at a by-election on 14 May 1964, following the death of the Labour MP Percy Wells. He was re-elected at the general election in October 1964 and again in 1966, but was defeated at the 1970 general election by the Conservative Roger Moate.

Announced in the 1976 Prime Minister's Resignation Honours, Boston was created a life peer as Baron Boston of Faversham, of Faversham in the County of Kent on 1 July 1976. He served as a deputy speaker of the House of Lords 1991–2008 and twice served as Chairman of Committees, 1994–1997 and 1997–2000.

== Personal life ==
In 1963, Boston married Margaret Head. They did not have any children.

He was a patron of the African Prisons Project, an international non-governmental organisation with a mission improve the welfare of prisoners through education, health and justice.

From 1980 to 1990, Boston was chairman of TVS, the ITV franchise holder for South and South-East England from 1982 until 1992.

== Arms ==
Coat of arms of Terence Boston, Baron Boston of Faversham

Crest
A chapeau Gules turned up Ermine thereon a boar's head couped Azure.
Escutcheon
Per pale Gules and Azure a lion passant guardant dimidated with a ship's hull Or. On a chief Argent a duck-billed platypus statant Proper between two cats' faces Sable.
Supporters
Dexter: A lion sejant erect guardant Or; Sinister: A kangaroo guardant Proper. Each resting the exterior foreleg on a fasces erect the axe facing outwards Sable.
Compartment
The whole upon a compartment comprising a grassy mount Vert growing therefrom roses Gules and Argent barbed seeded slipped and leaved Proper.

== Sources ==
- Leigh Rayment's Peerage Pages

Parliament of the United Kingdom
Preceded by Percy Wells	Member of Parliament for Faversham; 1964–1970	Succeeded by Sir Roger Moate
