= Faversham (constituency) =

Former parliamentary constituency in the United Kingdom

- Former county constituency for the House of Commons
- Faversham in Kent, showing boundaries used from 1983–1997

1885–1997
- Seats: one
- Created from: East Kent
- Replaced by: Sittingbourne & Sheppey, Faversham & Mid Kent

Faversham was a parliamentary constituency centred on the town of Faversham in Kent which returned one Member of Parliament (MP) to the House of Commons of the Parliament of the United Kingdom.

It was created for the 1885 general election, and abolished for the 1997 general election when it was replaced by the new constituencies of Sittingbourne and Sheppey, and Faversham and Mid Kent.

== Boundaries ==
1885–1918:

- The Borough of Faversham
- the Sessional Division of Faversham
- the corporate town of Queenborough

1918–1950:

- the Boroughs of Faversham and Queenborough,
- the Urban Districts of Milton Regis,
- Sheerness, and Sittingbourne,
- the Rural Districts of Milton and Sheppey,
- the Rural District of Faversham (except the detached parts of the parishes of Dunkirk and Hernhill which were wholly surrounded by the Rural District of Blean)

1950–1983:

- the Boroughs of Faversham and Queenborough
- the Urban Districts of Sheerness, Sittingbourne and Milton
- the Rural Districts of Sheppey and Swale

1983–1997:

- the Borough of Swale wards of Abbey, Borden, Davington Priory, East Downs, Eastern, Grove, Iwade and Lower Halstow
- Kemsley
- Milton Regis
- Minster Cliffs
- Murston
- Newington
- Queenborough and Halfway
- Roman
- St Ann's
- Sheerness East
- Sheerness West
- Sheppey Central
- Teynham and Lynsted
- Watling
- West Downs
- Woodstock

== Members of Parliament ==
Election	Member	Party
1885	Herbert Knatchbull-Hugessen	Conservative
1895	Frederic Barnes	Conservative
1900	John Howard	Conservative
1906	Thomas Napier	Liberal
Jan 1910	Sir Granville Wheler, Bt.	Conservative
1928 by-election	Sir Adam Maitland	Conservative
1945	Percy Wells	Labour
1964 by-election	Terry Boston	Labour
1970	Sir Roger Moate	Conservative
1997	constituency abolished	

== Elections ==
=== Elections in the 1880s ===
General election 1885: Faversham
Party	Candidate	Votes	%	±%
Conservative	Herbert Knatchbull-Hugessen	5,067	55.1	
Liberal	Francis Flint Belsey	4,123	44.9	
Majority		944	10.2	
Turnout		9,190	80.8	
Registered electors		11,370		
Conservative win (new seat)				

General election 1886: Faversham
Party	Candidate	Votes	%	±%
Conservative	Herbert Knatchbull-Hugessen	Unopposed		
Conservative hold				

=== Elections in the 1890s ===
General election 1892: Faversham
Party	Candidate	Votes	%	±%
Conservative	Herbert Knatchbull-Hugessen	4,846	51.1	N/A
Liberal	Sydney Hallifax	4,640	48.9	New
Majority		206	2.2	N/A
Turnout		9,486	66.7	N/A
Registered electors		14,219		
Conservative hold		Swing	N/A	

General election 1895: Faversham
Party	Candidate	Votes	%	±%
Conservative	Frederic Gorell Barnes	5,738	55.7	+4.6
Liberal	Samuel Barrow	4,557	44.3	−4.6
Majority		1,181	11.4	+9.2
Turnout		10,295	75.1	+8.4
Registered electors		13,701		
Conservative hold		Swing	+4.6	

=== Elections in the 1900s ===
General election 1900: Faversham
Party	Candidate	Votes	%	±%
Conservative	John Howard	Unopposed		
Conservative hold				

Thomas Napier

General election 1906: Faversham
Party	Candidate	Votes	%	±%
Liberal	Thomas Napier	6,925	57.6	New
Conservative	John Howard	5,091	42.4	N/A
Majority		1,834	15.2	N/A
Turnout		12,016	80.9	N/A
Registered electors		14,860		
Liberal gain from Conservative		Swing	N/A	

=== Elections in the 1910s ===
General election January 1910: Faversham
Party	Candidate	Votes	%	±%
Conservative	Granville Wheler	7,438	58.0	+15.6
Liberal	Thomas Napier	5,394	42.0	−15.6
Majority		2,044	16.0	N/A
Turnout		12,832	87.6	+6.7
Conservative gain from Liberal		Swing	+15.6	

Nicholls

General election December 1910: Faversham
Party	Candidate	Votes	%	±%
Conservative	Granville Wheler	6,897	57.4	−0.6
Lib-Lab	George Nicholls	5,111	42.6	+0.6
Majority		1,786	14.8	−1.2
Turnout		12,008	82.0	−5.6
Conservative hold		Swing	-0.6	

General Election 1914–15:

Another General Election was required to take place before the end of 1915. The political parties had been making preparations for an election to take place and by July 1914, the following candidates had been selected;

- Unionist: Granville Wheler
- Liberal:
- Labour: Stanley Morgan

General election 1918: Faversham
Party		Candidate	Votes	%	±%
C	Unionist	Granville Wheler	12,826	68.2	+10.8
	Labour	Stanley Morgan	5,981	31.8	New
Majority			6,845	36.4	+21.6
Turnout			18,807	50.2	−31.8
Registered electors			37,478		
	Unionist hold		Swing		
C indicates candidate endorsed by the coalition government.

=== Elections in the 1920s ===
General election 1922: Faversham
Party	Candidate	Votes	%	±%
Unionist	Granville Wheler	13,675	55.2	−13.0
Labour	Stanley Morgan	11,096	44.8	+13.0
Majority		2,579	10.4	−26.0
Turnout		24,771	61.7	+11.5
Registered electors		40,156		
Unionist hold		Swing	−13.0	

General election 1923: Faversham
Party	Candidate	Votes	%	±%
Unionist	Granville Wheler	13,422	52.1	−3.1
Labour	Stanley Morgan	12,361	47.9	+3.1
Majority		1,061	4.2	−6.2
Turnout		25,783	63.4	+1.7
Registered electors		40,676		
Unionist hold		Swing	−3.1	

General election 1924: Faversham
Party	Candidate	Votes	%	±%
Unionist	Granville Wheler	14,432	46.9	−5.2
Labour	Stanley Morgan	9,180	29.9	−18.0
Liberal	Albert J Soloman	7,132	23.2	New
Majority		5,252	17.0	+12.8
Turnout		30,744	73.9	+10.5
Registered electors		41,589		
Unionist hold		Swing	+6.4	

1928 Faversham by-election
Party	Candidate	Votes	%	±%
Unionist	Adam Maitland	12,997	41.7	−5.2
Labour	Dudley Aman	11,313	36.2	+6.3
Liberal	John Dunn	5,813	18.6	−4.6
Ind. Unionist	E.A. Hailwood	1,090	3.5	New
Majority		1,684	5.5	−11.5
Turnout		31,213	72.4	−1.5
Registered electors		43,122		
Unionist hold		Swing	−5.8	

General election 1929: Faversham
Party	Candidate	Votes	%	±%
Unionist	Adam Maitland	16,219	41.3	−5.6
Labour	Dudley Aman	15,275	38.9	+9.0
Liberal	Maurice Gerothwohl	7,782	19.8	−3.4
Majority		944	2.4	−14.6
Turnout		39,276	75.5	+1.6
Registered electors		52,047		
Unionist hold		Swing	−7.3	

=== Elections in the 1930s ===
General election 1931: Faversham
Party	Candidate	Votes	%	±%
Conservative	Adam Maitland	25,568	65.9	+24.6
Labour	Norman Smith	13,226	34.1	−4.8
Majority		12,342	31.8	+29.4
Turnout		38,794	72.2	−3.3
Conservative hold		Swing		

General election 1935: Faversham
Party	Candidate	Votes	%	±%
Conservative	Adam Maitland	22,881	54.6	−11.3
Labour	Norman Smith	19,060	45.4	+11.3
Majority		3,821	9.2	−22.6
Turnout		41,941	74.0	+1.8
Conservative hold		Swing		

General Election 1939–40

Another General Election was required to take place before the end of 1940. The political parties had been making preparations for an election to take place and by the Autumn of 1939, the following candidates had been selected;

- Conservative: Adam Maitland
- Labour: John Belcher

=== Elections in the 1940s ===
General election 1945: Faversham
Party	Candidate	Votes	%	±%
Labour	Percy Wells	23,502	52.8	+7.4
Conservative	Adam Maitland	21,037	47.2	−7.4
Majority		2,465	5.6	N/A
Turnout		44,539	73.1	−0.9
Labour gain from Conservative		Swing		

=== Elections in the 1950s ===
General election 1950: Faversham
Party	Candidate	Votes	%	±%
Labour	Percy Wells	23,620	48.71	
Conservative	J. E. Brooks	21,381	44.10	
Liberal	Elizabeth May Graham	3,486	7.19	New
Majority		2,239	4.61	
Turnout		48,487	86.33	
Labour hold		Swing		

General election 1951: Faversham
Party	Candidate	Votes	%	±%
Labour	Percy Wells	24,884	50.57	
Conservative	Clive Bossom	24,322	49.43	
Majority		562	1.14	
Turnout		49,206	86.04	
Labour hold		Swing		

General election 1955: Faversham
Party	Candidate	Votes	%	±%
Labour	Percy Wells	23,981	50.06	
Conservative	Clive Bossom	23,922	49.94	
Majority		59	0.12	
Turnout		47,903	78.36	
Labour hold		Swing		

General election 1959: Faversham
Party	Candidate	Votes	%	±%
Labour	Percy Wells	24,327	50.26	
Conservative	Elsie M. S. Olsen	24,074	49.74	
Majority		253	0.52	
Turnout		48,401	83.80	
Labour hold		Swing		

=== Elections in the 1960s ===
1964 Faversham by-election
Party	Candidate	Votes	%	±%
Labour	Terence Boston	24,749	55.1	+4.8
Conservative	Elsie M. S. Olsen	19,808	44.1	−3.6
Independent	Russell Eckley	352	0.8	New
Majority		4,941	11.0	+10.5
Turnout		44,909	74.8	−9.0
Labour hold		Swing	+10.5	

General election 1964: Faversham
Party	Candidate	Votes	%	±%
Labour	Terence Boston	24,243	49.1	−1.2
Conservative	Elsie M. S. Olsen	20,279	41.0	−8.7
Liberal	Paul Hayden	4,882	9.9	New
Majority		3,964	8.1	+7.6
Turnout		49,404	81.7	−2.1
Labour hold		Swing		

General election 1966: Faversham
Party	Candidate	Votes	%	±%
Labour	Terence Boston	26,375	52.5	+3.4
Conservative	Roger Moate	23,886	47.5	+6.5
Majority		2,489	5.0	−3.1
Turnout		50,261	79.9	−1.8
Labour hold		Swing	+1.5	

=== Elections in the 1970s ===
General election 1970: Faversham
Party	Candidate	Votes	%	±%
Conservative	Roger Moate	29,914	53.4	+5.9
Labour	Terence Boston	26,103	46.6	−5.9
Majority		3,811	6.8	+1.8
Turnout		56,013	78.1	−1.8
Conservative gain from Labour		Swing		

General election February 1974: Faversham
Party	Candidate	Votes	%	±%
Conservative	Roger Moate	26,316	42.2	−11.2
Labour	Mike Freedman	20,909	33.6	−13.0
Liberal	PJ Morgan	14,927	24.0	New
Community	E Dignan	151	0.2	New
Majority		5,407	8.6	+1.8
Turnout		62,301	82.6	
Conservative hold		Swing		

General election October 1974: Faversham
Party	Candidate	Votes	%	±%
Conservative	Roger Moate	25,087	43.0	+0.8
Labour	Mike Freedman	22,210	38.1	+4.5
Liberal	PJ Morgan	10,979	18.8	−5.2
Majority		2,877	4.9	−3.7
Turnout		58,276	76.7	−5.9
Conservative hold		Swing		

General election 1979: Faversham
Party	Candidate	Votes	%	±%
Conservative	Roger Moate	33,513	54.4	+11.4
Labour	T Sherwen	21,351	34.6	−3.5
Liberal	AC Aldous	6,349	10.3	−8.5
National Front	A Webb	439	0.7	New
Majority		12,162	19.8	+14.9
Turnout		61,653	78.5	+1.8
Conservative hold		Swing		

=== Elections in the 1980s ===
General election 1983: Faversham
Party	Candidate	Votes	%	±%
Conservative	Roger Moate	29,849	53.1	−1.3
SDP	Edward Goyder	15,252	27.1	+16.8
Labour	Christopher Bromley	11,130	19.8	−14.8
Majority		14,597	26.0	+6.2
Turnout		56,233	73.5	−5.0
Conservative hold		Swing		

General election 1987: Faversham
Party	Candidate	Votes	%	±%
Conservative	Roger Moate	31,074	51.1	−2.0
SDP	Edward Goyder	17,096	28.1	+1.0
Labour	Philip Dangerfield	12,616	20.8	+1.0
Majority		13,978	23.0	−3.0
Turnout		60,788	76.9	+3.4
Conservative hold		Swing		

=== Elections in the 1990s ===
General election 1992: Faversham
Party	Candidate	Votes	%	±%
Conservative	Roger Moate	32,755	50.1	−1.0
Labour	Helen Brinton	16,404	25.1	+4.3
Liberal Democrats	Roger Truelove	15,896	24.3	−3.8
Natural Law	Robin M. Bradshaw	294	0.5	New
Majority		16,351	25.0	+2.0
Turnout		65,352	79.7	+2.8
Conservative hold		Swing		
