= Herbert Knatchbull-Hugessen =

British Conservative politician

Member of Parliament for Faversham
- In office 1885–1895
- Preceded by: Constituency established
- Succeeded by: Frederic Gorell Barnes

Personal details
- Born: Herbert Thomas Knatchbull-Hugessen; 1 December 1835 Mersham, Kent, England
- Died: 15 May 1922 (aged 86)
- Party: Conservative
- Spouse: Elizabeth Burton (m. 1883)
- Children: 8
- Parent: Edward Knatchbull (father)
- Relatives: Edward Knatchbull-Hugessen (brother)
- Education: Trinity College, Oxford (MA)

Herbert Thomas Knatchbull-Hugessen (1 December 1835 – 15 May 1922) was a British Conservative politician.

Born at Mersham Hatch, he was the fourth son of Sir Edward Knatchbull, 9th Baronet and his second wife Fanny Catherine Knight, niece of author Jane Austen and eldest daughter of Edward Austen-Knight. His older brother was Edward Knatchbull-Hugessen, 1st Baron Brabourne. Knatchbull-Hugessen was educated at Eton College and then at Trinity College, Oxford, where he graduated with a Master of Arts in 1859. He entered the British House of Commons in 1885, sitting for Faversham until 1895. He was influential in the foundation of the modern Kent County Cricket Club in 1870, was on the club's committee and served as president for a year in the 1880s.

On 20 September 1883, he married Elizabeth Lewis Burton, daughter of Moses Burton, and had by her eight children, six sons and two daughters.

Parliament of the United Kingdom
New constituency	Member of Parliament for Faversham; 1885 – 1895	Succeeded by Frederic Gorell Barnes
