= Isambard Owen =

British academic

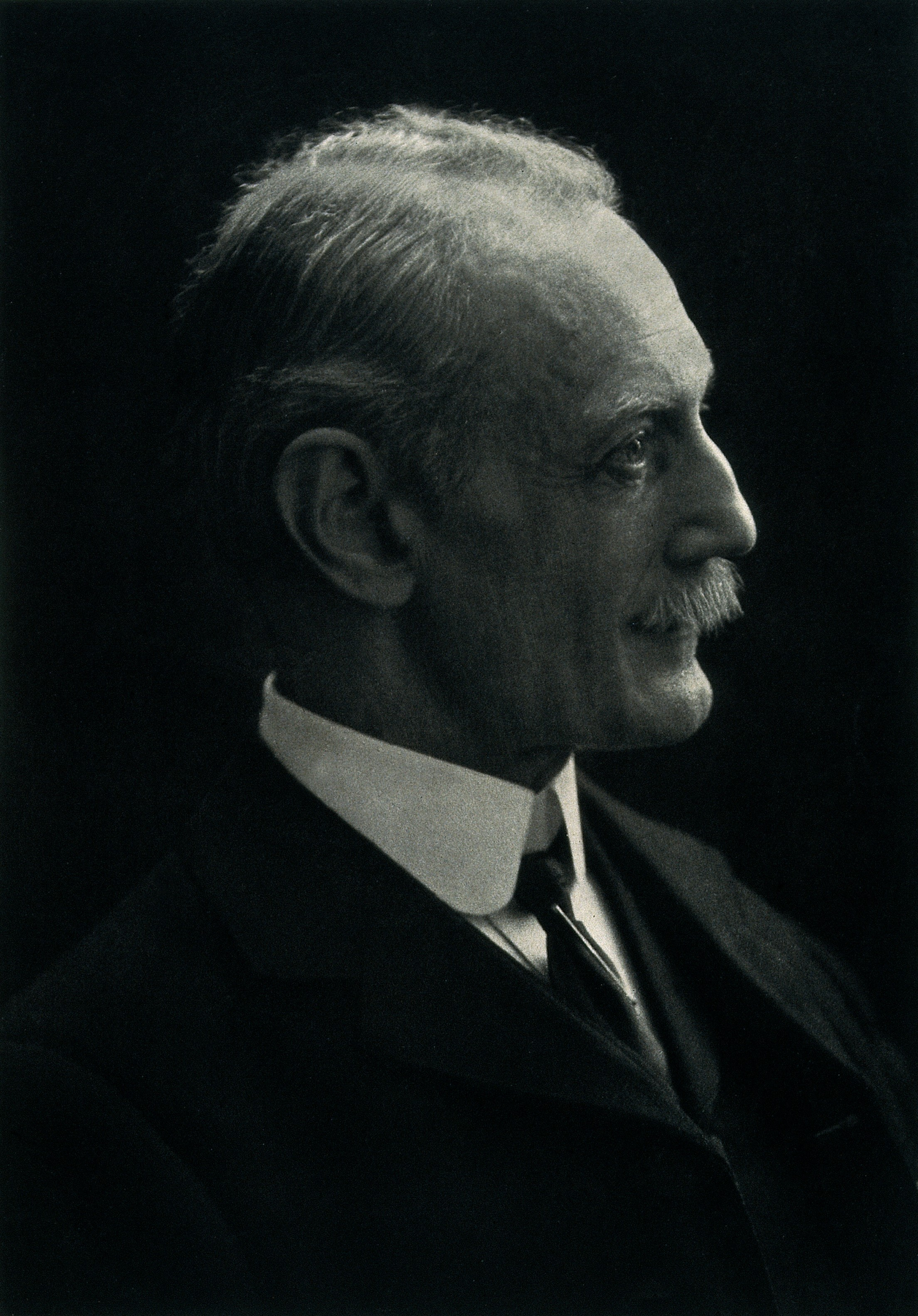

Sir Herbert Isambard Owen (28 December 1850 – 14 January 1927) was a British physician and university academic. He was the first vice-chancellor of the University of Bristol and a deputy chancellor of the University of Wales.

== Career ==
Owen was born in Chepstow in Monmouthshire, south Wales. At the time his father, William George Owen, later chief engineer of the Great Western Railway, was building the South Wales Railway under Isambard Kingdom Brunel, from whom Isambard Owen received his unusual middle name.

He was educated at The King's School, Gloucester, Rossall School and Downing College, Cambridge, where he read natural sciences. After graduating, he studied medicine at St George's Hospital, then returned to Cambridge to take his final MB and to study for his MD, which he received in 1882. He became a lecturer, author, and curator of the museum at St George's Hospital, and promoted the idea of establishing a new medical university in London.

He was active in Welsh cultural life in London. He was involved in reviving the Cymmrodorion Society, and in promoting the use of the Welsh language in schools within Wales; and was a leading member of the Society for the Utilisation of the Welsh Language.

Owen was a major figure in the creation of the University of Wales. He drew up a proposal for the university in 1891, was actively involved in meetings to establish the university, and became its deputy chancellor from its creation in 1894 until 1910. He was knighted in the 1902 Coronation Honours, receiving the accolade from King Edward VII at Buckingham Palace on 24 October that year. He was principal of Armstrong College, Newcastle (then a college of Durham University) 1904–09 and vice-chancellor of the University of Bristol 1909–21. In 1916 he was a factor in the "Hodgson Affair" when a leading academic was dismissed.

Owen was executor of the will of Prince Louis Lucien Bonaparte (1813–1891) and may have acted as medical advisor to the prince, who lived in London and was a philologist with an interest in the Celtic languages including Welsh.

He married Ethel Holland-Thomas in 1905, and had two daughters. He died in Paris in 1927, and was buried at Bangor.

Preceded by C. Lloyd Morgan	Vice-Chancellor of the University of Bristol; 1909–1921	Succeeded by Professor Francis Francis (acting)
