= Stanley Morgan (politician) =

Stanley James Wells Morgan (1870 – 16 December 1951) was a British Congregational minister, trade union organiser, and politician.

Born in Poplar, London, Morgan was active in the Congregational Church, and was appointed as its minister in Greenhithe, Kent, in 1894.

Morgan was appointed as chairman of the West Hill Hospital Board in 1910, serving for twenty-five years. His particular interest lay in mental health, and when, in 1921, the National Asylum Workers' Union (NAWU) and the Poor Law Workers' Trade Union decided to appoint a London and Southern Regional Organiser, he took the post. Although the Poor Law Workers' union withdrew from the arrangement the following year, the NAWU kept him on, and he remained in post until 1937, when he retired.

Morgan also became active in the Labour Party, representing Dartford on Kent County Council for many years. He was appointed as an alderman, but when the council was restructured in 1949, he decided instead to stand for his old Dartford seat again, and was successful.

Morgan contested numerous Parliamentary elections for the Labour Party: in Faversham at the 1918, 1922, 1923 and 1924 United Kingdom general elections, and then in Epsom at the 1929, 1931 and 1935 general elections. He was never elected, his best result being 47.9% of the vote in Faversham in 1923.

After retiring from trade union work, Morgan continued in his religious post. During World War II, he led services in a chalk tunnel at Greenhithe, which was being used as an air raid shelter.
