= David Maxwell Fyfe, 1st Earl of Kilmuir =

British lawyer and politician (1900–1967)

The Right Honourable The Earl of Kilmuir GCVO PC KC
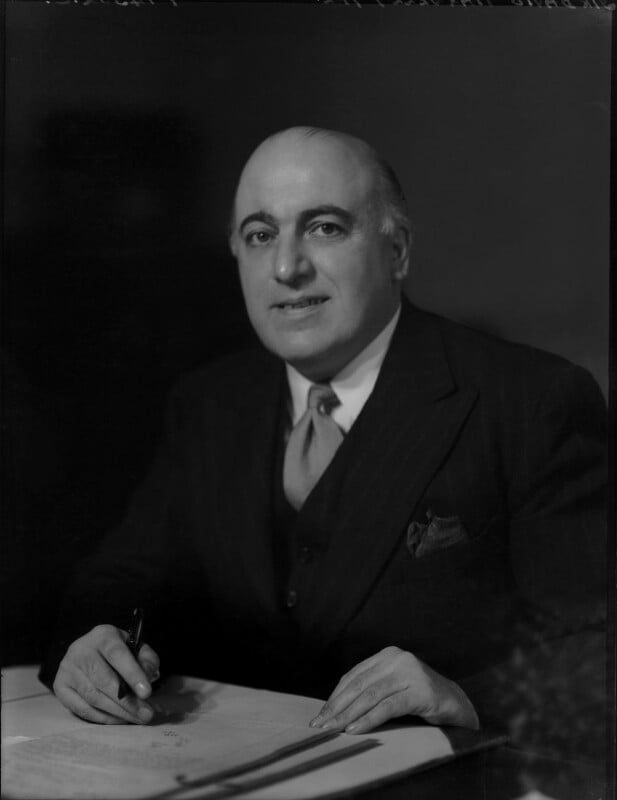
- Maxwell Fyfe in 1951

Lord Chancellor
- In office 18 October 1954 – 13 July 1962
- Monarch: Elizabeth II
- Prime Minister: Sir Winston Churchill; Sir Anthony Eden; Harold Macmillan
- Preceded by: The Viscount Simonds
- Succeeded by: The Lord Dilhorne

Home Secretary
- In office 27 October 1951 – 19 October 1954
- Prime Minister: Winston Churchill
- Preceded by: James Chuter Ede
- Succeeded by: Gwilym Lloyd George

Attorney General for England and Wales
- In office 25 May 1945 – 26 July 1945
- Prime Minister: Winston Churchill
- Preceded by: Sir Donald Somervell
- Succeeded by: Hartley Shawcross

Solicitor General for England and Wales
- In office 4 March 1942 – 25 May 1945
- Prime Minister: Winston Churchill
- Preceded by: Sir William Jowitt
- Succeeded by: Walter Monckton

Personal details
- Born: David Patrick Maxwell Fyfe; 29 May 1900 Edinburgh, Scotland
- Died: 27 January 1967 (aged 66) Withyham, England
- Party: Conservative
- Spouse: Sylvia Harrison (m. 1925)
- Children: 3
- Education: Balliol College, Oxford

David Patrick Maxwell Fyfe, 1st Earl of Kilmuir GCVO, PC (29 May 1900 – 27 January 1967), known as Sir David Maxwell Fyfe from 1942 to 1954 and as Viscount Kilmuir from 1954 to 1962, was a British Conservative politician, lawyer and judge who combined a legal career with political ambitions that took him to the offices of Solicitor General, Attorney General, Home Secretary and Lord High Chancellor of Great Britain.

One of the prosecuting counsel at the Nuremberg Trials, Maxwell Fyfe subsequently played a role in drafting the European Convention on Human Rights. As Home Secretary from 1951 to 1954 he greatly increased the number of prosecutions of homosexuals and declined to commute Derek Bentley's death sentence for the murder of a police officer. His political ambitions were ultimately dashed in Harold Macmillan's cabinet reshuffle of July 1962.

== Early life ==
Born in Edinburgh, the only son of William Thomson Fyfe, headmaster of Aberdeen Grammar School, by his second wife Isabella Campbell, daughter of David Campbell, of Dornoch, Sutherland, he was educated at George Watson's College and Balliol College, Oxford, where he achieved a third-class degree in Greats. Whilst at Oxford, he was a member of the Stubbs Society. His academic education was paused during his service in the Scots Guards in 1918–19, at the end of the World War I. After graduation, he worked for the British Commonwealth Union as political secretary to Sir Patrick Hannon MP, studying law in his spare time. He entered Gray's Inn and was called to the bar in 1922. He became a pupil of George Lynskey in Liverpool then joined his chambers to practise. Maxwell Fyfe later wrote that his ambition was to be a silk (King's Counsel) in his thirties, a minister in his forties and at the top of the legal profession in his fifties.

Not pausing before beginning his political career in earnest, he stood as a Conservative for Wigan in 1924, an unwinnable parliamentary seat. He cultivated the more winnable Spen Valley until 1929 when the party resolved not to oppose sitting Liberal Member of Parliament (MP) Sir John Simon while he was absent on the Simon Commission in India. Maxwell Fyfe was eventually elected to Parliament in Liverpool West Derby in a by-election in July 1935. Meanwhile, Maxwell Fyfe's legal career had prospered. In 1934 he became King's Counsel. He was Recorder of Oldham from 1936 to 1942.

== Early political career ==
Maxwell Fyfe, along with Patrick Spens, Derrick Gunston and others, backed the National Government over the Hoare–Laval Pact, and he supported Neville Chamberlain over the Munich Agreement. However, after the German occupation of Czechoslovakia in March 1939, Maxwell Fyfe joined the Territorial Army and, at the outbreak of World War II in September, he was deployed to the Judge Advocate-General's department with rank of major. He was badly injured in an air raid in September 1940. In May 1941 Maxwell Fyfe became deputy to Rab Butler's chairmanship of the Conservative Party Post War Problems Committee to draft policies for after the war. He took over as chairman from Butler between July 1943 and August 1944 while Butler was busy passing the Education Act 1944.

== Government ==
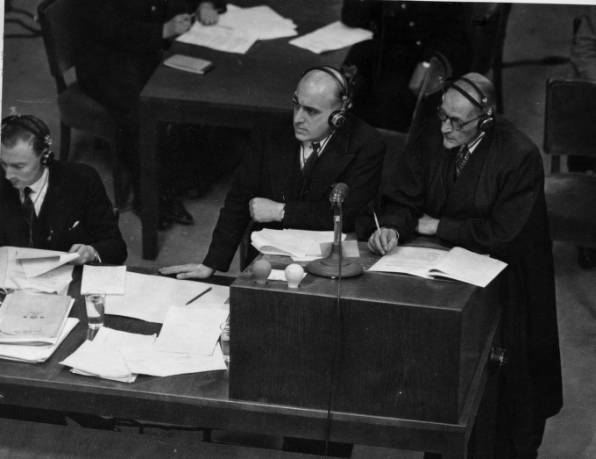
Sir David Maxwell Fyfe (centre) and an unknown prosecutor at the Nuremberg trials

In March 1942, Sir Winston Churchill, on the advice of Brendan Bracken, appointed Maxwell Fyfe Solicitor-General. At the same time he was knighted and sworn of the Privy Council. He applied himself to his work in the wartime coalition government with enormous industry and began some of the thinking and planning about how the leaders of the Nazi regime in Germany might be brought to account after the war. As part of his duties, on 8 April 1945, he attended an Anglo-American discussion over the war crimes trial, at which the historian Richard Overy says "he presented the standard British argument for summary execution." Whether Maxwell Fyfe believed such executions were the best method of dealing with the Nazis may be doubted, in view of his later work at the Nuremberg Trials; at the time, however, as a member of the government he had little choice but to follow the lead of the Prime Minister, Winston Churchill, who repeatedly urged that summary justice be visited upon the Nazi leaders. When the war in Europe ended and the coalition was dissolved in May 1945, Maxwell Fyfe was briefly Attorney-General in Churchill's caretaker government.

== Nuremberg trials ==
The Labour Party won a landslide victory in the United Kingdom general election of 1945 and Sir Hartley Shawcross became Attorney General and took responsibility as Britain's chief prosecutor in the Nuremberg trials. Shawcross, to emphasise the non-partisan nature of the trials, appointed Maxwell Fyfe his deputy. Shawcross was largely committed to his political duties in Westminster and played little part other than delivering the opening and closing speeches. Maxwell Fyfe took on most of the day-to-day responsibilities as "capable lawyer, efficient administrator and concerned housemaster". There were misgivings in some quarters as to how Maxwell Fyfe would perform, cross-examination not being regarded as one of his strengths. However, his cross-examination of Hermann Göring was one of the most noted in history.

== Opposition ==
After Nuremberg, Maxwell Fyfe returned to Parliament to shadow the Minister of Labour while simultaneously pursuing a full, busy and prominent career at the Bar, for example defending serial murderer John George Haigh in 1949. Reputedly, he would arrive at the House of Commons at around 5.00 pm, often stay throughout debates that lasted all night then, after a quick shave and breakfast, leave for court. He was assisted in his punishing schedule by his wife Sylvia, herself a Conservative Party worker. In 1945–51 he earned an annual average of £25,000.

Maxwell Fyfe played a leading role in drafting the party's Industrial Charter of 1947 and chaired the committee into Conservative Party organisation that resulted in the Maxwell Fyfe Report (1948–49). The report shifted the responsibility of funding electoral expenditure from the candidate to the constituency party, with the intention of broadening the diversity of MPs by making it harder for local associations to demand large personal donations from candidates. In practice, it may have had the effect of lending more power to constituency parties and making candidates more uniform.

Maxwell Fyfe was a champion of European integration and a member of the Parliamentary Assembly of the Council of Europe from August 1949 to May 1952, becoming the Chair of the Assembly's Committee on Legal and Administrative Questions, and rapporteur on the committee drafting the European Convention on Human Rights. In his memoirs he criticised Sir Anthony Eden for a negative stance that derailed the UK's opportunity to become a leader in Europe. Eden always rejected this and considered a libel action against Maxwell Fyfe.

== Return to government ==
=== Home Secretary ===
Shortly before the United Kingdom general election of 1951, Maxwell Fyfe caused a stir when he appeared to hint in a radio interview that a Conservative government might legislate to curb the power of trade unions. When the Conservative Party was returned to power in the election, Churchill thought it unwise to appoint him Minister of Labour, and Maxwell Fyfe became both Home Secretary and cabinet minister for Welsh affairs. He was responsible for guiding several complicated pieces of legislation through the Commons, in particular those that established commercial television. He gained a reputation as a hard-working, thorough and reliable cabinet member.

In 1952, the Director General of MI5 (DG) was made directly answerable to the Home Secretary rather than the Prime Minister. Given this novel responsibility, Maxwell Fyfe issued the Maxwell Fyfe Directive which became the de facto constitution of the Security Service until the Security Service Act 1989 set it on a statutory basis. When Sir Percy Sillitoe resigned as DG in 1953, Maxwell Fyfe delegated the shortlisting of a successor to a committee of civil servants chaired by Sir Edward Bridges. The committee put forward Dick White and Sir Kenneth Strong. Maxwell Fyfe endorsed the committee's preference for White, observing to Churchill that an internal appointment would be good for the morale of the service.

Maxwell Fyfe's assumption of office as Home Secretary heralded a reign of fear for male homosexuals. A stern advocate of existing legislation criminalising homosexual acts, he started a campaign to "rid England of this male vice … this plague" by dramatically increased arrests of male homosexuals through police surveillance and entrapment via the use of agents provocateurs, tapped telephones, forged documents and the absence of warrants. From 1,276 prosecutions in 1939 for actual or attempted sodomy or gross indecency, a year after he had assumed the office of Home Secretary prosecutions had soared to 5,443. Maxwell Fyfe subsequently sanctioned the establishment of the Wolfenden Report into homosexuality, but had he known its findings would recommend decriminalisation, it is unlikely he would have done so.

A conservative on the death penalty, Kilmuir was likewise conservative on the issue of homosexual rights, and led the opposition in the House of Lords to the implementation of the Wolfenden Report, which had recommended the decriminalisation of homosexual acts between consenting adults. Geraldine Bedell viewed this stance as ironic, since it was Maxwell Fyfe, while Home Secretary, who had led the opposition to law reform in the Lords. As Bedell also notes: "Perhaps he thought, by handing over to a committee, to shelve the issue. Perhaps he assumed Wolfenden would find against, in which case, he chose a curious chairman, because Wolfenden had a gay son, Jeremy." Kilmuir still opposed liberalisation when a bill was introduced in the Lords (by Lord Arran) in 1965. Says Bedell: "For the opposition, Lord Kilmuir warned against licensing the 'buggers' clubs' which he claimed were operating behind innocent-looking doors all over London." Maxwell Fyfe told the Conservative backbencher Sir Robert Boothby, who was known in parliamentary circles to be bisexual, that it was not his intention to legalise homosexuality: "I am not going down in history", he told Boothby, "as the man who made sodomy legal."

The execution date of serial child murderer John Straffen was fixed for 4 September 1952. On 29 August, however, Maxwell Fyfe commuted Straffen's sentence to one of life imprisonment following his personal recommendation to the Queen that Straffen be reprieved. During his tenure as Home Secretary, he was embroiled in the controversy surrounding the hanging of Derek Bentley. Maxwell Fyfe had controversially refused to grant a reprieve to Bentley despite the written petitions of 200 MPs and the claim that Bentley was intellectually disabled allegedly having a mental age of only 11. However, on most issues he was on the progressive wing of the Conservative Party, opposing the proposals in 1953 for the re-introduction of corporal punishment.

=== Lord Chancellor ===
Maxwell Fyfe remained ambitious and a Daily Mirror opinion poll in 1954, on the popular favourite to succeed Churchill as Party leader and prime minister, had him behind Eden and Butler but well ahead of Macmillan. In his memoirs (Political Adventure, p233) he later wrote that he had hoped to emerge as a compromise leader like Bonar Law in 1911 if Eden and Butler, both of whom he regarded as personal friends, found themselves in a dead heat. However, once it was clear that Eden was to be Churchill's successor, Maxwell Fyfe sought the office of Lord Chancellor.

On 19 October 1954 he was raised to the peerage as Viscount Kilmuir, of Creich in the County of Sutherland, and moved to the House of Lords and the "woolsack". Lord Kilmuir was a political Lord Chancellor, not restricting himself to his judicial role. He worked on many government issues including the constitution of Malta, which he wanted to become part of the UK, and the creation of the Restrictive Practices Court. In his eight years in the post he only sat as a judge on 24 appeals to the House of Lords. Lord Kilmuir opposed Sydney Silverman's 1956 private member's bill to abolish capital punishment. He described it as "an unwise and dangerous measure, the presence of which on the statute book would be a disaster for the country and a menace to the people". However, Kilmuir chaired the cabinet committee that recommended limiting the death penalty's scope and which led to the Homicide Act 1957. He feared the consequences of immigration to the United Kingdom and presented a report to the cabinet in 1956. Lord Kilmuir contended that the military intervention in the 1956 Suez Crisis was justified under the self-defence provisions of Article 51 of the United Nations Charter.

He continued in this office in the governments of Anthony Eden and Harold Macmillan until Macmillan's 1962 "Night of the Long Knives", when he was abruptly replaced by Sir Reginald Manningham-Buller, the Attorney-General. Kilmuir was made Baron Fyfe of Dornoch, of Dornoch in the County of Sutherland, and Earl of Kilmuir on 20 July 1962 to cushion the blow of retirement. He is said to have complained to Macmillan that he was being sacked with less notice than would be given to a cook, to which Macmillan replied that it was easier to get Lord Chancellors than good cooks.

== Personal life and death ==
Maxwell Fyfe married Sylvia Harrison in 1925 and they had three daughters, one of whom pre-deceased him. His brother-in-law was the actor Sir Rex Harrison. As Home Secretary, he often travelled to Wales. In the valleys of South Wales he was nicknamed Dai Bananas, Fyffes being one of Britain's major importers of the fruit. After government, Kilmuir joined the board of directors of Plessey but his health soon declined. He died at Withyham, Sussex, on 27 January 1967 and was cremated. His ashes were buried at the church of St Michael and All Angels at Withyham. His wealth at death was £22,202 (equivalent to £400,000 in 2025). His titles, which could pass only to sons, became extinct, as he had fathered only daughters.

== Legacy ==
=== Honours ===
Among his honours were:

- King's Counsel (KC) (1934)
- Knighthood (Kt) (1942)
- Privy Councillor (PC) (1945)
- Viscount Kilmuir (1954)
- Earl of Kilmuir (1962)
- Knight Grand Cross in the Royal Victorian Order (GCVO) (1953);
- Honorary degrees including:
  - University of Oxford;
  - University of Manitoba (LL.D) 1954.
  - University of Edinburgh (LL.D) 1955.
  - University of Wales;
  - University of Ottawa (LL.D) 16 September 1960.
- Visitor of St Antony's College, Oxford (1953); and
- Rector of the University of St Andrews (1956).

Coat of arms of David Maxwell Fyfe, 1st Earl of Kilmuir
Notes Displayed on a painted panel in the hall at Gray's Inn. Coronet A coronet of a British Earl. Crest A demi lion Gules between six ears of wheat issuant Or. Escutcheon Or a lion rampant Gules on a chief Gules a water bouget between two mullets Argent a border invected Argent. Motto Decens Et Honestum

=== Portrayals ===
David Maxwell Fyfe has been portrayed by the following actors in film, television and theatre productions:

- Iain Cuthbertson (1991) Let Him Have It (British/French film)
- Christopher Plummer (2000) Nuremberg (Canadian/U.S. TV production)
- Julian Wadham (2006) Nuremberg: Nazis on Trial (British television docudrama)
- Mel Smith (2007) Consenting Adults (British television drama)
- John Warnaby in Nicholas de Jongh's stage play, Plague Over England (London, 2009)
- As of 2011, there was a film being made about him called Under an English Heaven by his grandson Tom Blackmore. Though a complete film was never made.
- Zdzisław Mrożewski in the Polish film Epilog norymberski
- Richard E. Grant (2025) Nuremberg (U.S. film)

== Bibliography ==
- Obituaries:
  - The Times, 28 January 1967
  - The Guardian, 28 January 1967
- Alderman, K. (1992). "Harold Macmillan's 'Night of the long knives'". Contemporary Record. 6 (2): 243–265. doi:10.1080/13619469208581210.
- Andrew, C. (2009). The Defence of the Realm: The Authorized History of MI5. London: Allen Lane. ISBN 978-0-141-02330-4.
- Dutton, D. J. (2004)"Fyfe, David Patrick Maxwell, Earl of Kilmuir (1900–1967)", Oxford Dictionary of National Biography, Oxford University Press, accessed 4 Aug 2007 (subscription, Wikipedia Library access or UK public library membership required)
- Heuston, R. F. V. (1987). Lives of the Lord Chancellors, 1940–1970.
- Jago, Michael (2015). Rab Butler: The Best Prime Minister We Never Had?. Biteback Publishing. ISBN 978-1849549202.
- Lord Kilmuir (1964) Political Adventure
- Thorpe, D. R. (1989). Selwyn Lloyd. London: Jonathan Cape Ltd. ISBN 978-0-224-02828-8.
- Tusa, A. & Tusa, J. (1983) The Nuremberg Trial

Parliament of the United Kingdom
Preceded by Sir John Sandeman Allen	Member of Parliament for Liverpool West Derby; 1935–1954	Succeeded by John Woollam
Legal offices
Preceded by William Jowitt	Solicitor General for England and Wales; 1942–1945	Succeeded by Walter Monckton
Preceded by Sir Donald Somervell	Attorney General for England and Wales; 1945	Succeeded by Hartley Shawcross
Political offices
Preceded by Chuter Ede	Home Secretary; 1951–1954	Succeeded by Gwilym Lloyd George
Preceded by The Lord Simonds	Lord High Chancellor of Great Britain; 1954–1962	Succeeded by The Lord Dilhorne
Academic offices
Preceded by The Earl of Crawford	Rector of the University of St Andrews; 1955–1958	Succeeded by The Lord Boothby
Peerage of the United Kingdom
New creation	Earl of Kilmuir; 1962–1967	Extinct
New creation	Viscount Kilmuir; 1954–1967	Extinct
