= Dudley Aman, 1st Baron Marley =

British soldier and Labour politician

The Right Honourable The Lord Marley DSC
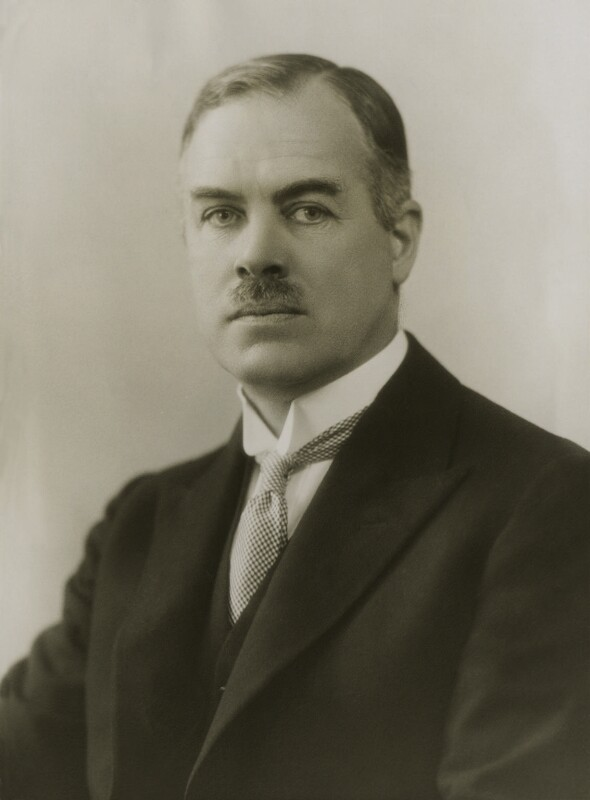

Government Chief Whip in the House of Lords
- In office 17 January 1930 – 24 August 1931
- Preceded by: The Earl De La Warr
- Succeeded by: The Earl of Lucan

Under-Secretary of State for War
- In office 5 June 1930 – 24 August 1931
- Preceded by: The Earl De La Warr
- Succeeded by: Vacant next held by The Earl Stanhope

Personal details
- Born: 16 May 1884
- Died: 29 February 1952 (aged 67)
- Spouse: Octable Turquet Reid (m. 1910)
- Children: Godfrey
- Education: Royal Naval College, Greenwich

Dudley Leigh Aman, 1st Baron Marley, DSC (16 May 1884 – 29 February 1952), was a British soldier and Labour politician.

Marley was the son of Edward Godfrey Aman, of Farnham, and was educated at Marlborough and the Royal Naval College, Greenwich. He joined the Royal Marine Artillery as a Second lieutenant 1 January 1902.

During the First World War he served in France and Belgium as a Major in the Royal Marine Artillery. He was mentioned in despatches and awarded the Distinguished Service Cross for his services at the Second Battle of Ypres. After the war he made five unsuccessful attempts to enter the House of Commons for the Labour Party, at Petersfield in 1922 and 1923, at Isle of Thanet in 1924, and at Faversham in a 1928 by-election and the 1929 general election. However, in January 1930 he was raised to the peerage by the Labour government of Ramsay MacDonald as Baron Marley, of Marley in the County of Sussex.

Marley then served under Macdonald as Under-Secretary of State for War and vice-president of the Army Council from June 1930 until the government fell in August 1931. From 1930 to 1937 he was Chief Labour Whip in the House of Lords and served as a Deputy Speaker of the House of Lords from 1930 to 1941.

As Chairman of the Parliamentary Advisory Committee for the aid of Jews in Europe Marley became deeply involved in the Jewish Autonomous Oblast of Birobidzhan, an area in eastern Siberia which was designated by Joseph Stalin as an autonomous area for the Jewish people. He wrote the introduction to The Brown Book of the Hitler Terror and the Burning of the Reichstag, a publication on the conditions of the Jewish population which greatly raised awareness among American Jewry about the Jews of Germany.

== Personal life ==
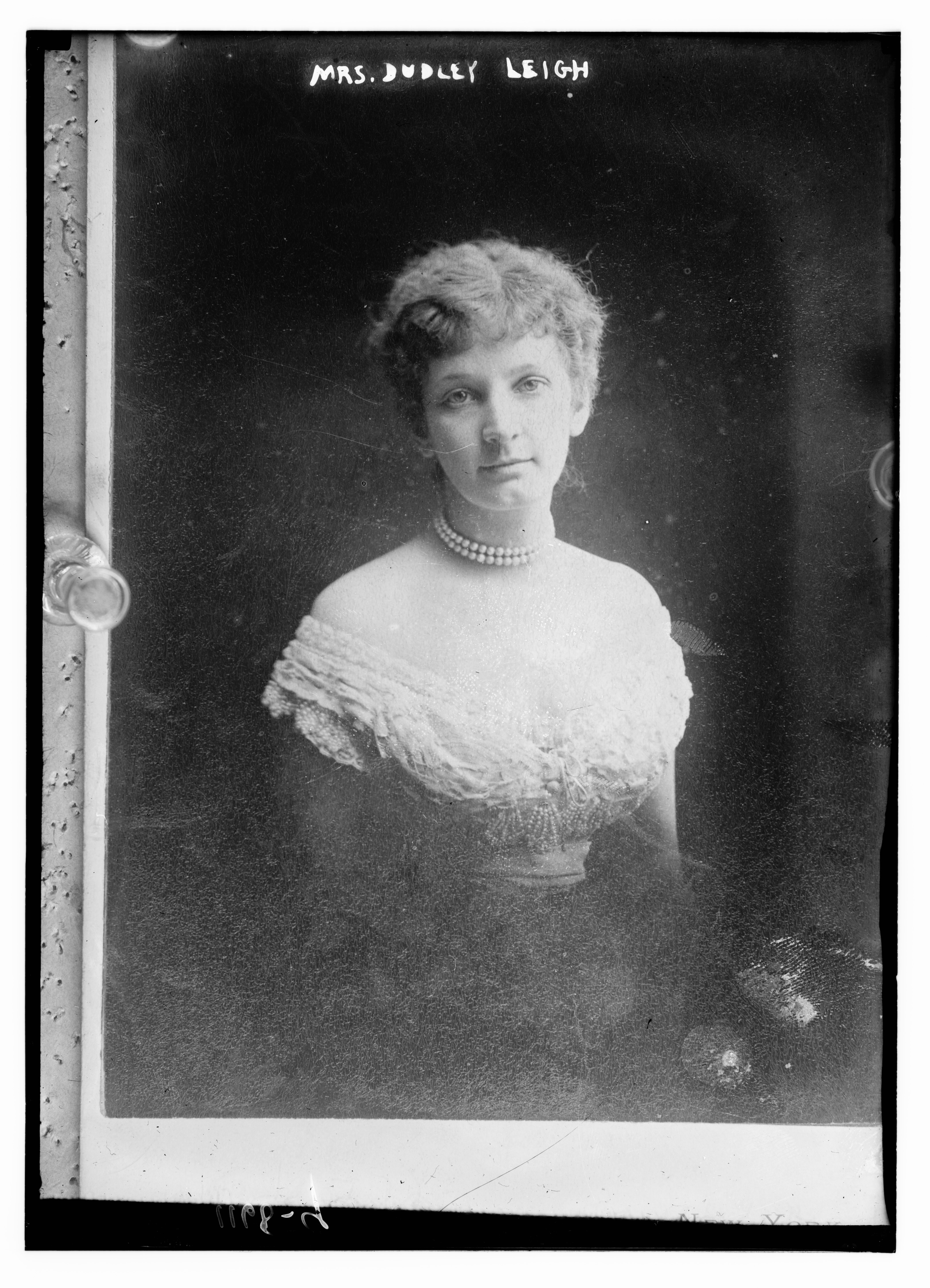
Mrs. Dudley Leigh

Lord Marley married Octable Turquet Reid, daughter of Sir Hugh Gilzean Reid, in 1910. He died in February 1952, aged 67, and was succeeded in the barony by his only son Godfrey. Lady Marley died in 1969.

== Sources ==
- Kidd, Charles, Williamson, David (editors). Debrett's Peerage and Baronetage (1990 edition). New York: St Martin's Press, 1990.
- Leigh Rayment's Peerage Pages
- Biography of Lord Marley
- Article on Lord Marley at the jewishquarterly.org

Political offices
Preceded by The Earl De La Warr	Government Chief Whip in the House of Lords; 17 January 1930 – 24 August 1931	Succeeded by The Earl of Lucan
Preceded by The Earl De La Warr	Under-Secretary of State for War; 5 June 1930 – 24 August 1931	Vacant
Party political offices
Preceded by The Earl De La Warr	Labour Chief Whip in the House of Lords; 1930 – 1937	Succeeded by The Lord Strabolgi
Peerage of the United Kingdom
New creation	Baron Marley; 1930 – 1952	Succeeded by Godfrey Pelham Leigh Aman
