= Sir Granville Wheler, 1st Baronet =

British MP (1872-1927)

Sir Granville Charles Hastings Wheler, 1st Baronet, CBE (1872–1927) was a British barrister and Conservative politician.

Educated at Eton College and Christ Church, Oxford, Wheler was called to the bar by the Middle Temple in 1898. He was Conservative MP for Faversham from the January 1910 general election until his death. He previously contested Osgoldcross at the 1906 general election, and the Colne Valley by-election, 1907.

During the First World War, he served in the British Army, reaching the rank of lieutenant-colonel.

Wheler was appointed CBE in 1920 and created a Baronet, of Otterden in the County of Kent, in the 1925 Birthday Honours.

== See also ==
- Wheler baronets
