= Adam Maitland =

British politician (1885–1949)

Sir Adam Maitland c.1928

Adam Maitland winning the 1928 election

Sir Adam Maitland (25 May 1885 – 5 October 1949) was a British Conservative Party politician who served as the member of parliament (MP) for Faversham in Kent. He entered Parliament as a result of the 25 January 1928 Faversham by-election, and held his seat until 1945. An accountant by profession, he was a Fellow of the Society of Accountants and Auditors. He received a knighthood in 1936, had been a director of the Pall Mall Gazette and Globe, and a director of the London board of the Royal Exchange Assurance.

== Personal ==
Maitland was born in Bury, Lancashire, on 25 May 1885 to Joseph Maitland (b.~1853) of Aberdeenshire and his wife Mary (b.~1855). Educated privately, on 6 September 1911, he married Nancy Helen, the daughter of Henry Chadwick of Bury, Greater Manchester.

== See also ==
- List of United Kingdom by-elections (1918–1931)
- List of MPs elected in the United Kingdom general election of 1935, 1931, and 1929
