= 1875 South West Lancashire by-election =

UK Parliamentary by-election

The 1875 South West Lancashire by-election was fought on 6 November 1875. The by-election in South West Lancashire was fought due to the incumbent Conservative MP, Charles Turner's death. The Conservative candidate John Ireland Blackburne won the election unopposed.
