= John Ireland Blackburne (1817–1893) =

British army officer and Conservative politician

John Ireland Blackburne JP
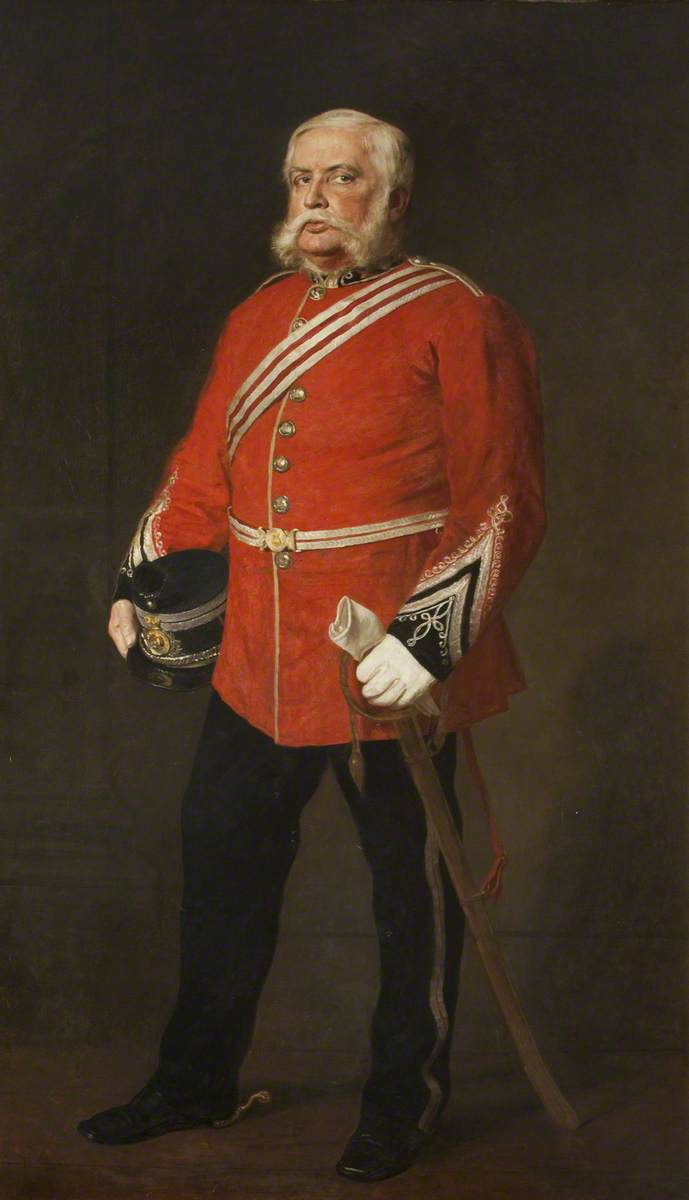
- Blackburne in 1875, by James Archer

Member of Parliament for Lancashire South West
- In office 1875–1885

Personal details
- Born: 28 May 1817 Hale Hall, Liverpool
- Died: 5 September 1893 (aged 76) London
- Education: Eton College

John Ireland Blackburne (28 May 1817 – 5 September 1893) was a British army officer and Conservative politician.

Blackburne came from a political family: his father, also John Ireland Blackburne was Member of Parliament (MP) for Newton from 1807 to 1818 and Warrington from 1835 to 1847, his mother was Anne née Bamford, of Bamford, Lancashire. His grandfather was John Blackburne (1754–1833), also a member of the Commons. He sat for Lancashire from 1784 – 1831.

He was born at Hale Hall near Liverpool, the family home of the Ireland Blackburnes, and was educated at Eton College. He obtained a commission in the 5th Dragoon Guards and served with the regiment for 14 years, retiring with the rank of captain. On 22 March 1853 he was appointed Lieutenant-Colonel Commandant of the newly raised part-time 4th Royal Lancashire Militia (The Duke of Lancaster's Own Light Infantry). After his retirement from the command he was appointed Honorary Colonel of the regiment on 11 July 1874 (from 1881 it became the 3rd (Militia) Battalion of the Prince of Wales's Volunteers (South Lancashire Regiment)).

In 1874 he inherited his father's large land holdings, and was actively involved in the management of the estate until his death, when it was noted that he was popular with his tenants. In October 1875, Charles Turner, MP for South West Lancashire, died. Accordingly, a by-election was held to fill the vacancy. Blackburne was the only candidate nominated, and was thus elected unopposed on 5 November 1875.

Blackburne successfully defended his seat at the 1880 general election. The Redistribution of Seats Act 1885 redistributed the two-seat South West Lancashire seat among seven new constituencies. Blackburne retired from parliament at the ensuing general election.

He was married twice. In 1846 he married Mary Hoghton, daughter of Sir Henry de Hoghton, Baronet. Following her death he married Emma Jemima Ravenscroft, widow of the 15th Viscount Hereford, who died in 1870.

Blackburne was a justice of the peace for the county palatine of Lancaster.

He died at his London residence after a long illness in September 1893, aged 77.

Parliament of the United Kingdom
Preceded by R A Cross; Charles Turner	Member of Parliament for Lancashire South West; 1875 – 1885; Served alongside: R A Cross	Constituency abolished
