= 1874 South West Lancashire by-election =

UK Parliamentary by-election

The 1874 South West Lancashire by-election was fought on 19 March 1874. The by-election was fought due to the incumbent Conservative MP, Richard Assheton Cross, becoming Home Secretary. It was retained by the incumbent.
