= South West Lancashire =

Parliamentary constituency in the United Kingdom, 1868–1885

- Former county constituency for the House of Commons
- County: Lancashire

1868–1885
- Seats: Two
- Created from: South Lancashire
- Replaced by: Bootle, Ince, Leigh, Newton, Ormskirk, St Helens, Southport and Widnes.

South West Lancashire was a county constituency of the House of Commons of the Parliament of the United Kingdom. It was represented by two Members of Parliament. The constituency was created by the Reform Act 1867 by the splitting of the South Lancashire constituency into new South-East and South-West divisions.

The constituency was abolished by the Redistribution of Seats Act 1885, being divided into eight single member divisions of Bootle, Ince, Leigh, Newton, Ormskirk, St Helens, Southport and Widnes.

== Boundaries ==
This constituency comprised the Lancashire hundred of West Derby except for the boroughs of Liverpool, Warrington and Wigan.

== Members of Parliament ==
- Constituency created (1868)

Election	1st Member	1st Party	2nd Member	2nd Party
1868	R. A. Cross	Conservative	Charles Turner	Conservative
1875	R. A. Cross	Conservative	John Ireland Blackburne	Conservative
1885	Redistribution of Seats Act constituency abolished			

== Elections ==
=== Elections in the 1860s ===
General election 1868: South West Lancashire
Party	Candidate	Votes	%	±%
Conservative	R. A. Cross	7,729	26.0	
Conservative	Charles Turner	7,676	25.8	
Liberal	William Ewart Gladstone	7,415	24.9	
Liberal	Henry Grenfell	6,939	23.3	
Majority		261	0.9	
Turnout		14,880 (est)	70.0 (est)	
Registered electors		21,261		
Conservative win (new seat)				
Conservative win (new seat)				

=== Elections in the 1870s ===
General election 1874: South West Lancashire
Party	Candidate	Votes	%	±%
Conservative	R. A. Cross	Unopposed		
Conservative	Charles Turner	Unopposed		
Registered electors		22,729		
Conservative hold				
Conservative hold				

R. A. Cross sought re-election after being appointed as Home Secretary.

By-election, 19 Mar 1874: South West Lancashire
Party	Candidate	Votes	%	±%
Conservative	R. A. Cross	Unopposed		
Conservative hold				

Charles Turner's death caused a by-election.

By-election, 6 Nov 1875: South West Lancashire
Party	Candidate	Votes	%	±%
Conservative	John Blackburne	Unopposed		
Conservative hold				

=== Elections in the 1880s ===
General election 1880: South West Lancashire
Party	Candidate	Votes	%	±%
Conservative	R. A. Cross	11,420	27.7	N/A
Conservative	John Blackburne	10,905	26.5	N/A
Liberal	William Rathbone	9,666	23.5	New
Liberal	Henry Molyneux	9,207	22.3	New
Majority		1,239	3.0	N/A
Turnout		20,599 (est)	79.1 (est)	N/A
Registered electors		26,054		
Conservative hold		Swing	N/A	
Conservative hold		Swing	N/A	

Cross was appointed Home Secretary, requiring a by-election.

By-election, 1 July 1885: South West Lancashire
Party	Candidate	Votes	%	±%
Conservative	R. A. Cross	Unopposed		
Conservative hold				

== Sources ==
- Leigh Rayment's Historical List of MPs – Constituencies beginning with "L" (part 1)
