= Redistribution of Seats Act 1885 =

Act of the Parliament of the United Kingdom reforming the electoral system

Redistribution of Seats Act 1885 (Note: Section 1.)
- Act of Parliament
- Parliament of the United Kingdom
- Long title: An Act for the Redistribution of Seats at Parliamentary Elections, and for other Purposes.
- Citation: 48 & 49 Vict. c. 23
- Introduced by: William Gladstone (Commons)
- Territorial extent: United Kingdom

Dates
- Royal assent: 25 June 1885
- Commencement: 25 June 1885 (Note: The Acts of Parliament (Commencement) Act 1793.)
- Repealed: England and Wales and Scotland: 30 July 1948; Northern Ireland:
Other legislation
Repeals/revokes	Norwich Voters Disfranchisement Act 1870; Dublin Voters Disfranchisement Act 1870; Norwich Voters Disfranchisement Act 1871
Amended by	Representation of the People Act 1918
Repealed by	England and Wales and Scotland: Representation of the People Act 1948; Northern Ireland: Elections and Franchise Act (Northern Ireland) 1946

Status: Repealed

Text of statute as originally enacted

The Redistribution of Seats Act 1885 (48 & 49 Vict. c. 23), sometimes called the Reform Act 1885 or the Redistribution Act 1885, was an act of the Parliament of the United Kingdom.

It was a piece of electoral reform legislation that redistributed the seats in the House of Commons, introducing the concept of equally populated constituencies, a concept in the broader global context termed equal apportionment, in an attempt to equalise representation across the UK. It mandated the abolition of constituencies below a certain population threshold. It was associated with, but not part of, the Representation of the People Act 1884 (48 & 49 Vict. c. 3).

== Background ==
The first major reform of seats in the House of Commons took place under the Reform Act 1832 (2 & 3 Will. 4. c. 45). The second major reform of Commons' seats occurred in three territory-specific Acts in 1867–68:

- the Reform Act 1867 (30 & 31 Vict. c. 102) applied to English and Welsh constituencies
- the Representation of the People (Scotland) Act 1868 (31 & 32 Vict. c. 48) applied to Scottish constituencies and gave Scotland an additional quota of seats
- the Representation of the People (Ireland) Act 1868 (31 & 32 Vict. c. 49) applied to Irish constituencies.

The latter United Kingdom set of acts had fallen short of the Chartist aim to enfranchise and to equalise the electorates. Electoral quotas diverged and the gap by 1885 widened; most starkly in the retention of boroughs of dubious size and a limited attempt at creation of new urban boroughs. In reductions these previous reforms had rather merged into their surroundings those boroughs (historic towns) having fewer than 10,000 inhabitants as at the 1861 census.

In a de-radicalising move (a policy of maintaining representation of the minority business interests or the minority party) Limited voting was adopted in a few of the largest cities. They were given three MPs but "no person shall vote for more than two candidates". As a result, the net partisan impact of these cities tended to be counterbalanced: for example, a borough formerly represented by two Liberals was now usually represented by two Liberals and one Conservative. In a Commons vote on party lines, the Conservative neutralised one of the Liberals, so that the borough counted for one party-based vote albeit having greater and slightly more equalised non-partisan local issue representation.

By contrast the mid-size boroughs with two members such as the new creations – wherever they so happened to have two MPs of the same party – produced twice the voting power in the House as such cities.

By the 1880s, continued industrial growth and resulting population movements had resulted in an increased imbalance between the constituencies in terms of the numbers of MPs and the population.

=== The Third Reform Bill ===
William Ewart Gladstone, leading a Liberal government, introduced a Representation of the People Bill in 1884, which sought to greatly extend the franchise but not to alter the boundaries of constituencies. The Liberals had a large majority in the House of Commons, and the measure passed through the House easily. The House of Lords, on the other hand, was dominated by the Conservative Party. The Conservative leader, Lord Salisbury, was opposed to the bill. The majority of the Conservative party's MPs were elected by the counties, with the Liberals being electorally strong in the boroughs. He realised that the bill's extension of household suffrage into the counties would enfranchise many rural voters such as coalminers and agricultural labourers who were likely to vote for the Liberals. This, he claimed, would lead to "the absolute effacement of the Conservative Party". Salisbury hoped to use the Conservative majority in the Lords to block the bill and force Gladstone to seek a dissolution of Parliament before the reforms could be enacted. The Lords duly rejected the bill and returned it to the Commons, provoking outrage among the Radical wing of the Liberals. A campaign organised around the slogan "The Peers Against the People" called for reform or abolition of the Lords if they rejected the bill a second time.

=== The Arlington Street Compact ===
During October 1884 Queen Victoria intervened in what was rapidly becoming a constitutional crisis, urging the party leaders to meet and break the deadlock. Negotiations duly started at Salisbury's London home in Arlington Street, Westminster, between the Conservative leader and Sir Charles Dilke, a member of Gladstone's cabinet. Lord Salisbury agreed to allow the reform bill to pass on condition that a bill to redistribute parliamentary seats was also enacted; the two parties reached an agreement, the "Arlington Street Compact", whereby the bulk of MPs would be elected in single-member constituencies. He calculated that this would minimise the adverse effect on the Conservatives of the extension of the vote: dividing the counties would allow Liberal-voting and Conservative-voting districts to be separated. The division of boroughs would allow the suburban areas of towns to be represented separately from the inner cities, allowing the growth of "Villa Toryism". Dilke, a member of the Radical (socially progressive) wing of the Liberal Party, also favoured the division of boroughs to weaken the influence of the Whig faction in the party. Before 1885 many existing two-member boroughs one Whig and one Radical were nominated by agreement, often leading to uncontested elections.

== The boundary commissions ==
Three boundary commissions were appointed in late 1884, one for England and Wales, one for Scotland and one for Ireland. Each commission was given similar instructions.

In dividing the counties they were to use Ordnance Survey maps and other documents in order to determine the boundaries of divisions. In doing so they were to ensure that each division of a county was to have an equal population "so far as practicable". In addition they were instructed "in all those cases where there are populous localities of an urban character to include them in one and the same division, unless this cannot be done without grave inconvenience, and involving boundaries of a very irregular and objectionable character". Subject to these rules, the divisions were to be as compact as possible and should be based on "well known local areas" such as petty sessional divisions or other aggregations of parishes. If necessary, an individual parish or parishes could be added to existing areas in order to equalise population, but under no circumstances was a parish to be divided. The county divisions were to be named after an "important town or place" within it, "preference being given to any merged borough or boroughs, or when it consists mainly of a well-known area, from that area". When the commissioners had devised a scheme of divisions for a county the details were to be advertised in the local press. A date would then be announced when one of the commissioners would attend at "a principal town" in the county to hear objections or proposed alterations.

The procedure for boroughs (or burghs in Scotland) was similar. Firstly the commissioners were to determine whether the present boundaries, or the boundaries proposed in the bill, embraced "the whole of the population which ought to be included within the borough". They could decide if an area formed a "community of interest" with the town and should be included within the borough boundaries. Where suburban areas had a sufficiently large population and distinct identity they might form a county division rather than be included in the borough. If boroughs were extended, existing "well-established" boundaries were to be used if possible. Where boroughs were to be divided, the population of each division was to be approximately equal, and "special regard" was to be had to the "pursuits of the population". This was clearly understood as meaning that working class and middle class parts of towns were to be separated where possible.

== Passage through Parliament ==
The bill was introduced to the House of Commons by the Prime Minister William Ewart Gladstone on 1 December 1884. The Bill was seen as a compromise measure, and did not include proportional representation. This led to unrest among the Liberals. Leonard Courteney, Financial Secretary to the Treasury, felt forced to resign his post and the party whip. Gladstone had held a meeting with Liberal MPs earlier in the day at the Foreign Office, where he defended the bill. He stated that far from being a compromise it was very much a government bill, and that the discussions with the opposition had been conducted with "no party bias". The bill received its second reading on 4 December 1884, and was then sent forward to the committee stage, which was to commence on 19 February 1885. The delay was to allow the boundary commissions to complete their work, with the boundaries and names of the new constituencies to be included as the schedules of the final Act.

In committee few changes were made to the boundaries recommended by the commissioners. However the committee felt that the proposed names for many of the divisions were unfamiliar, and preferred to use what they termed "geographical" names incorporating a compass point. A compromise was made where both were incorporated in the names of many of the constituencies: thus the seat officially called the "Northern or Biggleswade Division of Bedfordshire" was informally referred to as "Biggleswade", the "Biggleswade Division", "Northern Bedfordshire" or "North Bedfordshire".

The act received Royal Assent on 25 June, and the provisions of both the redistribution and representation acts first came into use at the 1885 general election.

== Provisions ==
The committee's work coupled with the Arlington Street Compact resulted a major redistribution under the act as follows:

- Parliamentary boroughs (later known as borough constituencies):
  - All these units with a population of 15,000 or less ceased to have separate representation and were merged into a wider division (constituency) of their county – namely 79 constituencies were disenfranchised.
  - Six other boroughs were also merged into the county divisions: four that included large extents of countryside (Aylesbury, Cricklade, East Retford, Shoreham) and two that had been disenfranchised for corruption (Macclesfield and Sandwich).
  - Those with populations between 15,000 and 50,000 were to have their representation reduced from two MPs to one, namely 76 constituencies.
  - Those with populations of more than 50,000 (23 in all) continued to be a set of two-member constituencies
  - The City of London would have its representation reduced to two MPs and remain undivided
  - The Universities of Oxford, Cambridge, and Dublin would each return two MPs.
- Two low-population English counties lost an MP: Rutland was reduced to one MP and Herefordshire to two MPs.
- The number of seats in the Commons was increased from 652 to 670, inclusive of Ireland. (Note: The number of seats had been fixed at 658 in the 1832 and 1867–8 legislation, but two two-member boroughs (Beverley and Bridgwater) and two single-member boroughs (Cashel and Sligo) had been disenfranchised for corruption.)

Apart from boundary changes, approximately 160 seats were new (or "liberated" as Gladstone described it) in England and Wales. The number of seats in Scotland was increased by 12, and the representation of Ireland in Parliament remained at 103 members, even though its population had declined relative to the rest of the United Kingdom, due to emigration which had continued since the famine. This arrangement was described by The Times as "...obviously dictated by a somewhat pusillanimous [weak-hearted] calculation that it was better to avoid a struggle with the Parnellite party."

== Consequences ==
=== Cessation of dual-MP constituency pacts and majority-minority appeal ===
The reduction in the number of two-member constituencies (elected by the bloc vote system) ended cross-party cooperation: before the act, in many counties and boroughs the two main parties had agreed to nominate one candidate each, and no election was held. Contested elections became the norm after the act: 657 of 670 seats were contested at the 1885 general election.

=== Recognition of the middle and working classes ===
The division of former two-member constituencies had a direct, clear consequence: it hastened the decline of the domination of Parliament by the aristocracy (formed of those who had won Royal and often military favour and their heirs, many of whom were accurately referred to as the landed gentry). After 1885, for the first time, MPs connected to industry and commerce outnumbered those closely related to the gentry. The Lords immediately stood out therefore as non-representative of the electorate; the "household suffrage" of 1885 gave the majority of men the vote; and by the end of 1918 all those aged over 21 could vote and most women.

Nonetheless, the Lords and their sons, grandsons and nephews in the Commons continued to form the greater part of the Cabinet until the Asquith ministry – further, the Lords legally bore equal strength, save for their inability to initiate bills spending public funds since 1407, until Asquith's constitutional Parliament Act 1911. The House of Lords could veto or amend bills sent to them by the Commons.

=== Electoral results and impact on strategy and attitudes ===
When the Redistribution of Seats Bill was being considered in 1884–85, the limited vote had little support. The redistribution eliminated the three and four member districts and the use of the Limited voting system disappeared.

Immediate expansion of the working class electorate caused the number of Lib/Lab MPs to rise from 2 in 1874 to 13 in 1885. The act's new seats saw a 1% single-party swing to the Conservatives and so a gain of only 10 seats and a similar gain of 11 seats by Independent Liberals, the latter often slightly more radical (redistributive) than both mainstream parties.

The sudden balance of power of the seats held or won by Irish Parliamentary Party candidates galvanised those opposed to Home Rule. This third party power of veto coupled with the end of local electoral pacts in a foreseeable way; Disraeli and Gladstone needed central control of their members to pursue narrower narratives and promote differing values. The IPP were often labelled particularly by the media and Conservatives as 'Parnellites'. Their power saw Gladstone make Home Rule his touchstone but, in so doing, distance his party from most peers who preferred conservative policies and guarded their near-equal power. Peers of the Whig persuasion flocked to a conservative line given immediate loss of family ties (hence leverage) in the Commons and tide of reformist policies engulfing the Liberal party caused by the act's generous franchise and loss of their coveted and often sponsored Whig-Radical and Whig-Conservative dual-member seats in the Commons. In short most peers felt change had gone far and fast enough. The opening words of free thought of the Lords, in its reply to the Queen's Speech came from the Duke of Abercorn who said:-

"My Lords, I rise to propose that an humble Address be presented to Her Majesty in reply to the Gracious Speech from the Throne, and in doing this I have to crave that indulgence from your Lordships which is always accorded to one who addresses your Lordships for the first time... Questions of vital moment and importance affecting the safety of the Empire will have to be discussed, and the country will carefully scrutinize them; and the manner in which they are treated by a Parliament elected for the first time under household suffrage will be earnestly watched. [emphasis added]

— Hansard HL Deb 21 January 1886 vol. 302 column 36

Liberal MPs opposing Home Rule rapidly formed a new party to stand at the next election in 1886, the Liberal Unionists who were willing to govern with Conservatives.

Liberals were unable to rely on any Lords' majorities (ratification) on their Bills from 1885 until the Parliament Act 1911. The 1911 Act ended the equal power of the House of Lords forever, constitutionally.

132 small areas ("parliamentary boroughs") were merged with part or all of their surrounding county constituency, all of which had previously returned two members. Courted for decades with the promise of for social change, religious freedom and free trade by Liberals, often served by a Radical-leaning alongside and a Whig-leaning MP, these boroughs had few Conservative MPs at most elections. Their substitute single-member seats where gaining suburban and wealthy rural parts particularly assisted the Conservative party, which took a position of national "strength and unity" in opposing Chamberlain's "radicalism" preferring instead education reform and opposing Gladstone's Home Rule "crusade" in favour of budgetary concessions and support for unionist Irish businesses. The ensuing Queens Speech showed the Queen was "...resolutely opposed [to Irish Home Rule] ...convinced that I shall be heartily supported by my Parliament and my people."

The Conservative party thinkers and leaders in both houses had now enfranchised the majority of men trusting them to break the deadlock in their favour; in return they had espoused religious freedom and almost completely free trade. The Liberal Party may have won the 1885 General Election however the new Lords heavy antipathy and the Irish question tore the party apart.

The majority of multi-member seats saw cooperation before 1885 whereas under the new one-MP-per-constituency norm, cooperation as patron and protégé or to attract opposing voters was futile. Whig and the most progressive Radical candidates could now be branded "weak", "divided" or "distanced" from the line of Gladstone and his successors which proved a flaw in the broad congregation of the Liberal Party until the formation of the final splinter group of 1931. Conservatives depicted Gladstone's dogged advancement of Home Rule, notably his failed first and second Irish Home Rule bills in 1886 and 1893, an open dissent from Her Majesty, as the root cause of Liberal Party disintegration. This unorthodoxy combined with heavy defeats on other Commons bills in the House of Lords which began to hemorrhage more Whigs led to electoral landslide victories for the Conservative party in 1886 and 1895 to break the deadlock.

== Redistributed seats: England ==
=== Bedfordshire === Representation decreased from 4 to 3 MPs
Boroughs
Before 1885	Change	After 1885
Bedford (2 MPs)	Representation reduced to one MP	Bedford (1 MP)
County Divisions
Before 1885	Change	After 1885
Bedfordshire (2 MPs)	Split into two divisions	Northern or Biggleswade Division (1 MP)
Bedfordshire (2 MPs)	Split into two divisions	Southern or Luton Division (1 MP)
=== Berkshire === Representation decreased from 8 to 5 MPs ‡ The Borough of Abingdon was partly in Oxfordshire
Boroughs
Before 1885	Change	After 1885
Abingdon‡ (1 MP)	Abolished. Gave its name to a county division.	
Reading (2 MPs)	Boundaries widened, representation reduced to one MP.	Reading (1 MP)
Wallingford (1 MP)	Abolished.	
Windsor (1 MP)	No change	Windsor (1 MP)
County Divisions
Before 1885	change	After 1885
Berkshire (3 MPs)	Split into three divisions. The abolished boroughs of Abingdon and Wallingford were included in the Abingdon Division.	Northern or Abingdon Division (1 MP)
Berkshire (3 MPs)	Split into three divisions. The abolished boroughs of Abingdon and Wallingford were included in the Abingdon Division.	Southern or Newbury Division (1 MP)
Berkshire (3 MPs)	Split into three divisions. The abolished boroughs of Abingdon and Wallingford were included in the Abingdon Division.	Eastern or Wokingham Division (1 MP)
=== Buckinghamshire === Representation decreased from 8 to 3 MPs ‡ The Borough of Great Marlow was partly in Berkshire
Boroughs
Before 1885	Change	After 1885
Aylesbury (2 MPs)	Abolished. Gave its name to a county division.	
Buckingham (1 MP)	Abolished. Gave its name to a county division.	
Chipping Wycombe (1 MP)	Abolished. Gave its name ("Wycombe") to a county division.	
Great Marlow‡ (1 MP)	Abolished.	
County Divisions
Before 1885	Change	After 1885
Buckinghamshire (3 MPs)	Split into three divisions. The Aylesbury Division absorbed the abolished boroughs of Aylesbury and Great Marlow. The Buckingham Division absorbed Buckingham and the Wycombe Division absorbed Chipping Wycombe.	Mid or Aylesbury Division (1 MP)
Buckinghamshire (3 MPs)	Split into three divisions. The Aylesbury Division absorbed the abolished boroughs of Aylesbury and Great Marlow. The Buckingham Division absorbed Buckingham and the Wycombe Division absorbed Chipping Wycombe.	Northern or Buckingham Division (1 MP)
Buckinghamshire (3 MPs)	Split into three divisions. The Aylesbury Division absorbed the abolished boroughs of Aylesbury and Great Marlow. The Buckingham Division absorbed Buckingham and the Wycombe Division absorbed Chipping Wycombe.	Southern or Wycombe Division (1 MP)
=== Cambridgeshire === Representation decreased from 5 to 4 MPs
Boroughs
Before 1885	Change	After 1885
Cambridge (2 MPs)	Representation reduced to one MP	Cambridge (1 MP)
County Divisions
Before 1885	Change	After 1885
Cambridgeshire (3 MPs)	Split into three divisions.	Western or Chesterton Division (1 MP)
Cambridgeshire (3 MPs)	Split into three divisions.	Eastern or Newmarket Division (1 MP)
Cambridgeshire (3 MPs)	Split into three divisions.	Northern or Wisbech Division (1 MP)
=== Cheshire === Representation decreased from 14 to 13 MPs ‡ The Boroughs of Stalybridge and Stockport were partly in Lancashire
Boroughs
Before 1885	Change	After 1885
Birkenhead (1 MP)	No change	Birkenhead (1 MP)
Chester (2 MPs)	Representation reduced to one MP	Chester (1 MP)
Macclesfield (2 MPs)	Disenfranchised for corruption Gave name to county division.	
Stalybridge‡ (1 MP)	Boundaries extended	Stalybridge (1 MP)
Stockport‡ (2 MPs)	No change	Stockport (2 MPs)
County Divisions
Before 1885	Change	After 1885
East Division (2 MPs)	Divided into 8 divisions: The East Division formed the basis of the new Macclesfield Division; The Mid Division was divided into the new Altrincham, Hyde and Knutsford Divisions (with parts going to the Crewe, Macclesfield and Northwich Divisions); The South Division was divided into the new Eddisbury and Wirral Divisions (with parts going to the Crewe Division and the Northwich Division).	Altrincham Division (1 MP)
East Division (2 MPs)	Divided into 8 divisions: The East Division formed the basis of the new Macclesfield Division; The Mid Division was divided into the new Altrincham, Hyde and Knutsford Divisions (with parts going to the Crewe, Macclesfield and Northwich Divisions); The South Division was divided into the new Eddisbury and Wirral Divisions (with parts going to the Crewe Division and the Northwich Division).	Crewe Division (1 MP)
Mid Division (2 MPs)	Divided into 8 divisions: The East Division formed the basis of the new Macclesfield Division; The Mid Division was divided into the new Altrincham, Hyde and Knutsford Divisions (with parts going to the Crewe, Macclesfield and Northwich Divisions); The South Division was divided into the new Eddisbury and Wirral Divisions (with parts going to the Crewe Division and the Northwich Division).	Eddisbury Division (1 MP)
Mid Division (2 MPs)	Divided into 8 divisions: The East Division formed the basis of the new Macclesfield Division; The Mid Division was divided into the new Altrincham, Hyde and Knutsford Divisions (with parts going to the Crewe, Macclesfield and Northwich Divisions); The South Division was divided into the new Eddisbury and Wirral Divisions (with parts going to the Crewe Division and the Northwich Division).	Hyde Division (1 MP)
Mid Division (2 MPs)	Divided into 8 divisions: The East Division formed the basis of the new Macclesfield Division; The Mid Division was divided into the new Altrincham, Hyde and Knutsford Divisions (with parts going to the Crewe, Macclesfield and Northwich Divisions); The South Division was divided into the new Eddisbury and Wirral Divisions (with parts going to the Crewe Division and the Northwich Division).	Knutsford Division (1 MP)
West Division (2 MPs)	Divided into 8 divisions: The East Division formed the basis of the new Macclesfield Division; The Mid Division was divided into the new Altrincham, Hyde and Knutsford Divisions (with parts going to the Crewe, Macclesfield and Northwich Divisions); The South Division was divided into the new Eddisbury and Wirral Divisions (with parts going to the Crewe Division and the Northwich Division).	Macclesfield Division (1 MP)
West Division (2 MPs)	Divided into 8 divisions: The East Division formed the basis of the new Macclesfield Division; The Mid Division was divided into the new Altrincham, Hyde and Knutsford Divisions (with parts going to the Crewe, Macclesfield and Northwich Divisions); The South Division was divided into the new Eddisbury and Wirral Divisions (with parts going to the Crewe Division and the Northwich Division).	Northwich Division (1 MP)
West Division (2 MPs)	Divided into 8 divisions: The East Division formed the basis of the new Macclesfield Division; The Mid Division was divided into the new Altrincham, Hyde and Knutsford Divisions (with parts going to the Crewe, Macclesfield and Northwich Divisions); The South Division was divided into the new Eddisbury and Wirral Divisions (with parts going to the Crewe Division and the Northwich Division).	Wirral Division (1 MP)
=== Cornwall === Representation decreased from 13 to 7 MPs
Boroughs
Before 1885	Change	After 1885
Bodmin (1 MP)	Abolished. Gave its name to a county division.	
Helston (1 MP)	Abolished.	
Launceston (1 MP)	Abolished. Gave its name to a county division.	
Liskeard (1 MP)	Abolished.	
Penryn and Falmouth (2 MPs)	Representation reduced to one MP	Penryn and Falmouth (1 MP)
St Ives (1 MP)	Abolished. Gave its name to a county division.	
Truro (2 MPs)	Abolished. Gave its name to a county division.	
County Divisions
Before 1885	Change	After 1885
Eastern Division (2 MPs)	Divided into 6 Divisions.: The Eastern Division was divided into the new North-Eastern and South-Eastern Divisions (with part going to the Mid Division); The Western Division was divided into the new North-Western, Truro and Western Divisions (with part going to the Mid Division)	Mid or St Austell Division (1 MP)
Eastern Division (2 MPs)	Divided into 6 Divisions.: The Eastern Division was divided into the new North-Eastern and South-Eastern Divisions (with part going to the Mid Division); The Western Division was divided into the new North-Western, Truro and Western Divisions (with part going to the Mid Division)	North-Eastern or Launceston Division (1 MP)
Eastern Division (2 MPs)	Divided into 6 Divisions.: The Eastern Division was divided into the new North-Eastern and South-Eastern Divisions (with part going to the Mid Division); The Western Division was divided into the new North-Western, Truro and Western Divisions (with part going to the Mid Division)	North-Western or Camborne Division (1 MP)
Western Division (2 MPs)	Divided into 6 Divisions.: The Eastern Division was divided into the new North-Eastern and South-Eastern Divisions (with part going to the Mid Division); The Western Division was divided into the new North-Western, Truro and Western Divisions (with part going to the Mid Division)	South-Eastern or Bodmin Division (1 MP)
Western Division (2 MPs)	Divided into 6 Divisions.: The Eastern Division was divided into the new North-Eastern and South-Eastern Divisions (with part going to the Mid Division); The Western Division was divided into the new North-Western, Truro and Western Divisions (with part going to the Mid Division)	Truro Division (1 MP)
Western Division (2 MPs)	Divided into 6 Divisions.: The Eastern Division was divided into the new North-Eastern and South-Eastern Divisions (with part going to the Mid Division); The Western Division was divided into the new North-Western, Truro and Western Divisions (with part going to the Mid Division)	Western or St Ives Division (1 MP)
=== Cumberland === Representation decreased from 8 to 6 MPs
Boroughs
Before 1885	Change	After 1885
Carlisle (2 MPs)	Representation reduced to one MP.	Carlisle (1 MP)
Cockermouth (1 MP)	Abolished. Gave its name to a county division.	
Whitehaven (1 MP)	No change	Whitehaven (1 MP)
County Divisions
Before 1885	Change	After 1885
Eastern Division (2 MPs)	Reorganised into four divisions, absorbed abolished Borough of Cockermouth.	Cockermouth Division (1 MP)
Eastern Division (2 MPs)	Reorganised into four divisions, absorbed abolished Borough of Cockermouth.	Egremont (or Western) Division (1 MP)
Western Division (2 MPs)	Reorganised into four divisions, absorbed abolished Borough of Cockermouth.	Eskdale (or Northern) Division (1 MP)
Western Division (2 MPs)	Reorganised into four divisions, absorbed abolished Borough of Cockermouth.	Penrith (or Mid) Division (1 MP)
=== Derbyshire === Representation increased from 8 to 9 MPs
Boroughs
Before 1885	Change	After 1885
Derby (2 MPs)	Boundaries extended.	Derby (2 MPs)
County Divisions
Before 1885	Change	After 1885
East Division (2 MPs)	Reorganised into seven divisions.	Chesterfield Division (1 MP)
East Division (2 MPs)	Reorganised into seven divisions.	Mid Division (1 MP)
North Division (2 MPs)	Reorganised into seven divisions.	North-Eastern Division (1 MP)
North Division (2 MPs)	Reorganised into seven divisions.	Southern Division (1 MP)
South Division (2 MPs)	Reorganised into seven divisions.	Western Division (1 MP)
South Division (2 MPs)	Reorganised into seven divisions.	High Peak Division (1 MP)
South Division (2 MPs)	Reorganised into seven divisions.	Ilkeston Division (1 MP)
=== Devon === Representation decreased from 17 to 13 MPs
Boroughs
Before 1885	Change	After 1885
Barnstaple (2 MPs)	Abolished. Gave its name to a county division.	
Devonport (2 MPs)	No change	Devonport (2 MPs)
Exeter (2 MPs)	Representation reduced to one MP.	Exeter (1 MP)
Plymouth (2 MPs)	No change	Plymouth (2 MPs)
Tavistock (1 MP)	Abolished. Gave its name to a county division.	
Tiverton (2 MPs)	Abolished. Gave its name to a county division.	
County Divisions
Before 1885	Change	After 1885
East Division (2 MPs)	Reorganised into eight divisions, absorbed abolished boroughs of Barnstaple, Tavistock and Tiverton.	Eastern or Honiton Division (1 MP)
East Division (2 MPs)	Reorganised into eight divisions, absorbed abolished boroughs of Barnstaple, Tavistock and Tiverton.	Mid or Ashburton Division (1 MP)
East Division (2 MPs)	Reorganised into eight divisions, absorbed abolished boroughs of Barnstaple, Tavistock and Tiverton.	Northern or South Molton Division (1 MP)
North Division (2 MPs)	Reorganised into eight divisions, absorbed abolished boroughs of Barnstaple, Tavistock and Tiverton.	North-Eastern or Tiverton Division (1 MP)
North Division (2 MPs)	Reorganised into eight divisions, absorbed abolished boroughs of Barnstaple, Tavistock and Tiverton.	North-Western or Barnstaple Division (1 MP)
South Division (2 MPs)	Reorganised into eight divisions, absorbed abolished boroughs of Barnstaple, Tavistock and Tiverton.	Torquay Division (1 MP)
South Division (2 MPs)	Reorganised into eight divisions, absorbed abolished boroughs of Barnstaple, Tavistock and Tiverton.	Southern or Totnes Division (1 MP)
South Division (2 MPs)	Reorganised into eight divisions, absorbed abolished boroughs of Barnstaple, Tavistock and Tiverton.	Western or Tavistock Division (1 MP)
=== Dorset === Representation decreased from 10 to 4 MPs ‡ The Borough of Shaftesbury was partly in Wiltshire
Boroughs
Before 1885	Change	After 1885
Bridport (1 MP)	Abolished.	
Dorchester (1 MP)	Abolished.	
Poole (1 MP)	Abolished.	
Shaftesbury‡ (1 MP)	Abolished.	
Wareham (1 MP)	Abolished.	
Weymouth and Melcombe Regis (2 MPs)	Abolished.	
County Divisions
Before 1885	Change	After 1885
Dorset (3 MPs)	Split into four divisions, absorbing the six abolished boroughs.	Eastern Division (1 MP)
Dorset (3 MPs)	Split into four divisions, absorbing the six abolished boroughs.	Northern Division (1 MP)
Dorset (3 MPs)	Split into four divisions, absorbing the six abolished boroughs.	Southern Division (1 MP)
Dorset (3 MPs)	Split into four divisions, absorbing the six abolished boroughs.	Western Division (1 MP)
=== Durham === Representation increased from 13 to 16 MPs
Boroughs
Before 1885	Change	After 1885
Darlington (1 MP)	Boundaries widened.	Darlington (1 MP)
Durham City (2 MPs)	Representation reduced to one MP.	Durham City (1 MP)
Gateshead (1 MP)	No change	Gateshead (1 MP)
Hartlepool (1 MP)	No change	Hartlepool (1 MP)
South Shields (1 MP)	No change	South Shields (1 MP)
Stockton (1 MP)	No change	Stockton (1 MP)
Sunderland (2 MPs)	No change	Sunderland (2 MPs)
County Divisions
Before 1885	Change	After 1885
Northern Division (2 MPs)	Reorganised into eight divisions	Barnard Castle Division (1 MP)
Northern Division (2 MPs)	Reorganised into eight divisions	Bishop Auckland Division (1 MP)
Northern Division (2 MPs)	Reorganised into eight divisions	Chester Le Street Division (1 MP)
Northern Division (2 MPs)	Reorganised into eight divisions	Houghton Le Spring Division (1 MP)
Southern Division (2 MPs)	Reorganised into eight divisions	Jarrow Division (1 MP)
Southern Division (2 MPs)	Reorganised into eight divisions	Mid Division (1 MP)
Southern Division (2 MPs)	Reorganised into eight divisions	North-Western Division (1 MP)
Southern Division (2 MPs)	Reorganised into eight divisions	South-Eastern Division (1 MP)
=== Essex === Representation increased from 10 to 11 MPs
Boroughs
Before 1885	Change	After 1885
Colchester (2 MPs)	Representation reduced to one MP.	Colchester (1 MP)
Harwich (1 MP)	Abolished. Gave its name to a county division.	
Maldon (1 MP)	Abolished. Gave its name to a county division.	
Formed part of South Division of county	New parliamentary borough of West Ham, divided into two single-member divisions	West Ham, North Division (1 MP)
Formed part of South Division of county	New parliamentary borough of West Ham, divided into two single-member divisions	West Ham, South Division (1 MP)
County Divisions
Before 1885	Change	After 1885
East Division (2 MPs)	Reorganised into eight divisions. Part of former South Division constituted as parliamentary borough of West Ham.	Eastern or Maldon Division (1 MP)
East Division (2 MPs)	Reorganised into eight divisions. Part of former South Division constituted as parliamentary borough of West Ham.	Mid or Chelmsford Division (1 MP)
South Division (2 MPs)	Reorganised into eight divisions. Part of former South Division constituted as parliamentary borough of West Ham.	Northern or Saffron Walden Division (1 MP)
South Division (2 MPs)	Reorganised into eight divisions. Part of former South Division constituted as parliamentary borough of West Ham.	North-Eastern or Harwich Division (1 MP)
South Division (2 MPs)	Reorganised into eight divisions. Part of former South Division constituted as parliamentary borough of West Ham.	Southern or Romford Division (1 MP)
West Division (2 MPs)	Reorganised into eight divisions. Part of former South Division constituted as parliamentary borough of West Ham.	South-Eastern Division (1 MP)
West Division (2 MPs)	Reorganised into eight divisions. Part of former South Division constituted as parliamentary borough of West Ham.	South-Western or Walthamstow Division (1 MP)
West Division (2 MPs)	Reorganised into eight divisions. Part of former South Division constituted as parliamentary borough of West Ham.	Western or Epping Division (1 MP)
=== Gloucestershire === Representation decreased from 13 to 11 MPs ‡ The Borough of Bristol was partly in Somerset
Boroughs
Before 1885	Change	After 1885
Bristol‡ (2 MPs)	Boundaries of parliamentary borough extended to include St George, Horfield, and Stapleton, and part of Bedminster. Divided into four single-member divisions.	Bristol, East Division (1 MP)
Bristol‡ (2 MPs)	Boundaries of parliamentary borough extended to include St George, Horfield, and Stapleton, and part of Bedminster. Divided into four single-member divisions.	Bristol, North Division (1 MP)
Bristol‡ (2 MPs)	Boundaries of parliamentary borough extended to include St George, Horfield, and Stapleton, and part of Bedminster. Divided into four single-member divisions.	Bristol, South Division (1 MP)
Bristol‡ (2 MPs)	Boundaries of parliamentary borough extended to include St George, Horfield, and Stapleton, and part of Bedminster. Divided into four single-member divisions.	Bristol, West Division (1 MP)
Cheltenham (1 MP)	Boundaries extended to include Charlton Kings	Cheltenham (1 MP)
Cirencester (1 MP)	Abolished. Gave its name to a county division.	
Gloucester (2 MPs)	Representation reduced to one MP.	Gloucester (1 MP)
Stroud (2 MPs)	Abolished. Gave its name to a county division.	
Tewkesbury (1 MP)	Abolished. Gave its name to a county division.	
County Divisions
Before 1885	Change	After 1885
Eastern Division (2 MPs)	Reorganised into five divisions, absorbing boroughs of Stroud and Tewkesbury. Part of former Western Division included in parliamentary borough of Bristol.	Eastern or Cirencester Division (1 MP)
Eastern Division (2 MPs)	Reorganised into five divisions, absorbing boroughs of Stroud and Tewkesbury. Part of former Western Division included in parliamentary borough of Bristol.	Forest of Dean Division (1 MP)
Eastern Division (2 MPs)	Reorganised into five divisions, absorbing boroughs of Stroud and Tewkesbury. Part of former Western Division included in parliamentary borough of Bristol.	Mid or Stroud Division (1 MP)
Western Division (2 MPs)	Reorganised into five divisions, absorbing boroughs of Stroud and Tewkesbury. Part of former Western Division included in parliamentary borough of Bristol.	Northern or Tewkesbury Division (1 MP)
Western Division (2 MPs)	Reorganised into five divisions, absorbing boroughs of Stroud and Tewkesbury. Part of former Western Division included in parliamentary borough of Bristol.	Southern or Thornbury Division (1 MP)
=== Hampshire and Isle of Wight === Representation decreased from 16 to 12 MPs
Boroughs
Before 1885	Change	After 1885
Andover (1 MP)	Abolished. Gave its name to a county division.	
Christchurch (1 MP)	No change	Christchurch (1 MP)
Lymington (1 MP)	Abolished. Gave its name to a county division.	
Newport (Isle of Wight) (1 MP)	Abolished. Area included in Isle of Wight division.	
Petersfield (1 MP)	Abolished. Gave its name to a county division.	
Portsmouth (2 MPs)	No change	Portsmouth (2 MPs)
Southampton (2 MPs)	Boundaries widened to include Millbrook, Bitterne and St. Mary Extra areas	Southampton (2 MPs)
Winchester (2 MPs)	Representation reduced to one MP.	Winchester (1 MP)
County Divisions
Before 1885	Change	After 1885
Northern Division (2 MPs)	Reorganised into five single-member divisions, absorbing parliamentary boroughs of Andover, Lymington and Petersfield.	Eastern or Petersfield Division (1 MP)
Northern Division (2 MPs)	Reorganised into five single-member divisions, absorbing parliamentary boroughs of Andover, Lymington and Petersfield.	New Forest Division (1 MP)
Northern Division (2 MPs)	Reorganised into five single-member divisions, absorbing parliamentary boroughs of Andover, Lymington and Petersfield.	Northern or Basingstoke Division (1 MP)
Southern Division (2 MPs)	Reorganised into five single-member divisions, absorbing parliamentary boroughs of Andover, Lymington and Petersfield.	Southern or Fareham Division (1 MP)
Southern Division (2 MPs)	Reorganised into five single-member divisions, absorbing parliamentary boroughs of Andover, Lymington and Petersfield.	Western or Andover Division (1 MP)
Isle of Wight Division (1 MP)	Absorbed the parliamentary borough of Newport.	Isle of Wight Division (1 MP)
=== Herefordshire === Representation decreased from 6 to 3 MPs
Boroughs
Before 1885	Change	After 1885
Hereford (2 MPs)	Representation reduced to one MP.	Hereford (1 MP)
Leominster (1 MP)	Abolished. Gave its name to a county division.	
County Divisions
Before 1885	Change	After 1885
Herefordshire (3 MPs)	Split into two divisions, absorbed parliamentary borough of Leominster.	Leominster or Northern Division (1 MP)
Herefordshire (3 MPs)	Split into two divisions, absorbed parliamentary borough of Leominster.	Ross or Southern Division (1 MP)
=== Hertfordshire === Representation remained at 4 MPs
Boroughs
Before 1885	Change	After 1885
Hertford (1 MP)	Abolished. Gave its name to a county division.	
County Divisions
Before 1885	Change	After 1885
Hertfordshire (3 MPs)	Split into four divisions, absorbed parliamentary borough of Hertford.	Eastern or Hertford Division
Hertfordshire (3 MPs)	Split into four divisions, absorbed parliamentary borough of Hertford.	Mid or St Albans Division
Hertfordshire (3 MPs)	Split into four divisions, absorbed parliamentary borough of Hertford.	Northern or Hitchin Division
Hertfordshire (3 MPs)	Split into four divisions, absorbed parliamentary borough of Hertford.	Western or Watford Division
=== Huntingdonshire === Representation decreased from 3 to 2 MPs
Boroughs
Before 1885	Change	After 1885
Huntingdon (1 MP)	Abolished. Gave its name to a county division.	
County Divisions
Before 1885	Change	After 1885
Huntingdonshire (2 MPs)	Split into two divisions, absorbed parliamentary borough of Huntingdon.	Northern or Ramsey Division
Huntingdonshire (2 MPs)	Split into two divisions, absorbed parliamentary borough of Huntingdon.	Southern or Huntingdon Division
=== Kent === Representation decreased from 21 to 19 MPs † Formed part of "The Metropolis" of London
Boroughs
Before 1885	Change	After 1885
Canterbury (2 MPs)	Representation reduced to one MP.	Canterbury (1 MP)
Chatham (1 MP)	No change	Chatham (1 MP)
Dover (2 MPs)	Representation reduced to one MP.	Dover (1 MP)
Gravesend (1 MP)	No change	Gravesend (1 MP)
Greenwich (2 MPs)†	Boundaries altered, with areas transferred to create new boroughs of Deptford and Woolwich, each represented by one MP.	Greenwich (1 MP)†
Greenwich (2 MPs)†	Boundaries altered, with areas transferred to create new boroughs of Deptford and Woolwich, each represented by one MP.	Deptford (1 MP)†
Greenwich (2 MPs)†	Boundaries altered, with areas transferred to create new boroughs of Deptford and Woolwich, each represented by one MP.	Woolwich (1 MP)†
Hythe (1 MP)	No change	Hythe (1 MP)
Formed part of West Division of county	New parliamentary borough	Lewisham (1 MP)†
Maidstone (2 MPs)	Boundaries altered. Representation reduced to one MP.	Maidstone (1 MP)
Rochester (2 MPs)	Representation reduced to one MP.	Rochester (1 MP)
Sandwich (2 MPs)	Disenfranchised for corruption	
County Divisions
Before 1885	Change	After 1885
Eastern Division (2 MPs)	Reorganised into eight single-member divisions, absorbing parliamentary borough of Sandwich	Southern or Ashford Division (1 MP)
Eastern Division (2 MPs)	Reorganised into eight single-member divisions, absorbing parliamentary borough of Sandwich	North-Western or Dartford Division (1 MP)
Eastern Division (2 MPs)	Reorganised into eight single-member divisions, absorbing parliamentary borough of Sandwich	North-Eastern or Faversham Division (1 MP)
Mid Kent (2 MPs)	Reorganised into eight single-member divisions, absorbing parliamentary borough of Sandwich	Isle of Thanet Division (1 MP)
Mid Kent (2 MPs)	Reorganised into eight single-member divisions, absorbing parliamentary borough of Sandwich	Mid or Medway Division (1 MP)
Mid Kent (2 MPs)	Reorganised into eight single-member divisions, absorbing parliamentary borough of Sandwich	Eastern or St Augustine's Division (1 MP)
Kent West (2 MPs)	Reorganised into eight single-member divisions, absorbing parliamentary borough of Sandwich	Western or Sevenoaks Division (1 MP)
Kent West (2 MPs)	Reorganised into eight single-member divisions, absorbing parliamentary borough of Sandwich	South Western or Tunbridge Division (1 MP)
=== Lancashire === Representation increased from 32 to 57 MPs ‡ The Borough of Warrington was partly in Cheshire
Boroughs
Before 1885	Change	After 1885
Ashton-under-Lyne (1 MP)	Boundaries extended to include the local government district of Hurst.	Ashton-under-Lyne (1 MP)
Formed from part of North Division of county	New parliamentary borough	Barrow-in-Furness (1 MP)
Blackburn (2 MPs)	Boundaries extended to include entire municipal borough.	Blackburn (2 MPs)
Bolton (2 MPs)	Boundaries extended to include entire municipal borough.	Bolton (2 MPs)
Burnley (1 MP)	No change	Burnley (1 MP)
Bury (1 MP)	Boundaries extended to include entire municipal borough.	Bury (1 MP)
Clitheroe (1 MP)	Abolished. Gave its name to a county division.	
Liverpool (3 MPs)	Boundaries of parliamentary borough extended to include entirety of Toxteth Park and parts of Walton-on-the-Hill, Wavertree, and West Derby. Divided into nine single-member divisions.	Abercromby Division (1 MP)
Liverpool (3 MPs)	Boundaries of parliamentary borough extended to include entirety of Toxteth Park and parts of Walton-on-the-Hill, Wavertree, and West Derby. Divided into nine single-member divisions.	East Toxteth Division (1 MP)
Liverpool (3 MPs)	Boundaries of parliamentary borough extended to include entirety of Toxteth Park and parts of Walton-on-the-Hill, Wavertree, and West Derby. Divided into nine single-member divisions.	Everton Division (1 MP)
Liverpool (3 MPs)	Boundaries of parliamentary borough extended to include entirety of Toxteth Park and parts of Walton-on-the-Hill, Wavertree, and West Derby. Divided into nine single-member divisions.	Exchange Division (1 MP)
Liverpool (3 MPs)	Boundaries of parliamentary borough extended to include entirety of Toxteth Park and parts of Walton-on-the-Hill, Wavertree, and West Derby. Divided into nine single-member divisions.	Kirkdale Division (1 MP)
Liverpool (3 MPs)	Boundaries of parliamentary borough extended to include entirety of Toxteth Park and parts of Walton-on-the-Hill, Wavertree, and West Derby. Divided into nine single-member divisions.	Scotland Division (1 MP)
Liverpool (3 MPs)	Boundaries of parliamentary borough extended to include entirety of Toxteth Park and parts of Walton-on-the-Hill, Wavertree, and West Derby. Divided into nine single-member divisions.	Walton Division (1 MP)
Liverpool (3 MPs)	Boundaries of parliamentary borough extended to include entirety of Toxteth Park and parts of Walton-on-the-Hill, Wavertree, and West Derby. Divided into nine single-member divisions.	West Derby Division (1 MP)
Liverpool (3 MPs)	Boundaries of parliamentary borough extended to include entirety of Toxteth Park and parts of Walton-on-the-Hill, Wavertree, and West Derby. Divided into nine single-member divisions.	West Toxteth Division (1 MP)
Manchester (3 MPs)	Boundaries of parliamentary borough extended to include the local government districts of Moss Side and Rusholme and a detached part of the parish of Gorton. Divided into six single-member divisions.	East Division (1 MP)
Manchester (3 MPs)	Boundaries of parliamentary borough extended to include the local government districts of Moss Side and Rusholme and a detached part of the parish of Gorton. Divided into six single-member divisions.	North Division (1 MP)
Manchester (3 MPs)	Boundaries of parliamentary borough extended to include the local government districts of Moss Side and Rusholme and a detached part of the parish of Gorton. Divided into six single-member divisions.	North East Division (1 MP)
Manchester (3 MPs)	Boundaries of parliamentary borough extended to include the local government districts of Moss Side and Rusholme and a detached part of the parish of Gorton. Divided into six single-member divisions.	North West Division (1 MP)
Manchester (3 MPs)	Boundaries of parliamentary borough extended to include the local government districts of Moss Side and Rusholme and a detached part of the parish of Gorton. Divided into six single-member divisions.	South Division (1 MP)
Manchester (3 MPs)	Boundaries of parliamentary borough extended to include the local government districts of Moss Side and Rusholme and a detached part of the parish of Gorton. Divided into six single-member divisions.	South West (1 MP)
Oldham (2 MPs)	Boundaries extended to include entire municipal borough.	Oldham (2 MPs)
Preston (2 MPs)	Boundaries changed to comprise entire municipal borough of Preston, (with extended boundaries due to come into effect on 1 June 1889), and the local government district of Fulwood.	Preston (2 MPs)
Rochdale (1 MP)	No change	Rochdale (1 MP)
Formed from part of South West Division of county	New parliamentary borough	St Helens (1 MP)
Salford (2 MPs)	Divided into three single-member divisions.	North Division (1 MP)
Salford (2 MPs)	Divided into three single-member divisions.	South Division (1 MP)
Salford (2 MPs)	Divided into three single-member divisions.	West Division (1 MP)
Warrington‡ (1 MP)	No change	Warrington‡ (1 MP)
Wigan (2 MPs)	Representation reduced to one MP.	Wigan (1 MP)
County Divisions
Before 1885	Change	After 1885
North Division (2 MPs)	Divided into four single-member divisions, part constituted as new parliamentary borough of Barrow-in-Furness.	Blackpool Division (1 MP)
North Division (2 MPs)	Divided into four single-member divisions, part constituted as new parliamentary borough of Barrow-in-Furness.	Chorley Division (1 MP)
North Division (2 MPs)	Divided into four single-member divisions, part constituted as new parliamentary borough of Barrow-in-Furness.	Lancaster Division (1 MP)
North Division (2 MPs)	Divided into four single-member divisions, part constituted as new parliamentary borough of Barrow-in-Furness.	North Lonsdale Division (1 MP)
North-East Division (2 MPs)	Absorbed former parliamentary borough of Clitheroe, divided into four single-member divisions.	Accrington Division (1 MP)
North-East Division (2 MPs)	Absorbed former parliamentary borough of Clitheroe, divided into four single-member divisions.	Clitheroe Division (1 MP)
North-East Division (2 MPs)	Absorbed former parliamentary borough of Clitheroe, divided into four single-member divisions.	Darwen Division (1 MP)
North-East Division (2 MPs)	Absorbed former parliamentary borough of Clitheroe, divided into four single-member divisions.	Rossendale Division (1 MP)
South-East Division (2 MPs)	Divided into eight single-member divisions.	Eccles Division (1 MP)
South-East Division (2 MPs)	Divided into eight single-member divisions.	Gorton Division (1 MP)
South-East Division (2 MPs)	Divided into eight single-member divisions.	Heywood Division (1 MP)
South-East Division (2 MPs)	Divided into eight single-member divisions.	Middleton Division (1 MP)
South-East Division (2 MPs)	Divided into eight single-member divisions.	Prestwich Division (1 MP)
South-East Division (2 MPs)	Divided into eight single-member divisions.	Radcliffe cum Farnworth Division (1 MP)
South-East Division (2 MPs)	Divided into eight single-member divisions.	Stretford Division (1 MP)
South-East Division (2 MPs)	Divided into eight single-member divisions.	Westhoughton Division (1 MP)
South-West Division (2 MPs)	Divided into seven single-member divisions, part constituted as new parliamentary borough of St Helens.	Bootle Division (1 MP)
South-West Division (2 MPs)	Divided into seven single-member divisions, part constituted as new parliamentary borough of St Helens.	Ince Division (1 MP)
South-West Division (2 MPs)	Divided into seven single-member divisions, part constituted as new parliamentary borough of St Helens.	Leigh Division (1 MP)
South-West Division (2 MPs)	Divided into seven single-member divisions, part constituted as new parliamentary borough of St Helens.	Newton Division (1 MP)
South-West Division (2 MPs)	Divided into seven single-member divisions, part constituted as new parliamentary borough of St Helens.	Ormskirk Division (1 MP)
South-West Division (2 MPs)	Divided into seven single-member divisions, part constituted as new parliamentary borough of St Helens.	Southport Division (1 MP)
South-West Division (2 MPs)	Divided into seven single-member divisions, part constituted as new parliamentary borough of St Helens.	Widnes Division (1 MP)
=== Leicestershire === Representation remained at 6 MPs
Boroughs
Before 1885	Change	After 1885
Leicester (2 MPs)	No change	Leicester (2 MPs)
County Divisions
Before 1885	Change	After 1885
Northern Division (2 MPs)	Divided into four single-member divisions.	Eastern (or Melton) Division (1 MP)
Northern Division (2 MPs)	Divided into four single-member divisions.	Mid (or Loughborough) Division (1 MP)
Southern Division (2 MPs)	Divided into four single-member divisions.	Southern (or Harborough) Division (1 MP)
Southern Division (2 MPs)	Divided into four single-member divisions.	Western (or Bosworth) Division (1 MP)
=== Lincolnshire === Representation decreased from 14 to 11 MPs ‡ The Borough of Stamford was partly in Northamptonshire
Boroughs
Before 1885	Change	After 1885
Boston (2 MPs)	Representation reduced to one MP. Boundaries simplified.	Boston (1 MP)
Grantham (2 MPs)	Representation reduced to one MP.	Grantham (1 MP)
Great Grimsby (1 MP)	No change	Great Grimsby (1 MP)
Lincoln (2 MPs)	Representation reduced to one MP. Boundaries extended to include Bracebridge.	Lincoln (1 MP)
Stamford‡ (1 MP)	Abolished. Gave its name to a county division.	
County Divisions
Before 1885	Change	After 1885
Lincolnshire Mid (2 MPs)	Divided into seven single-member divisions.	North Lindsey (or Brigg) Division (1 MP)
Lincolnshire Mid (2 MPs)	Divided into seven single-member divisions.	West Lindsey (or Gainsborough) Division (1 MP)
Lincolnshire North (2 MPs)	Divided into seven single-member divisions.	South Lindsey (or Horncastle) Division) (1 MP)
Lincolnshire North (2 MPs)	Divided into seven single-member divisions.	East Lindsey (or Louth) Division (1 MP)
Lincolnshire South (2 MPs)	Divided into seven single-member divisions.	North Kesteven (or Sleaford) Division (1 MP)
Lincolnshire South (2 MPs)	Divided into seven single-member divisions.	Holland (or Spalding) Division (1 MP)
Lincolnshire South (2 MPs)	Divided into seven single-member divisions.	South Kesteven (or Stamford) Division (1 MP)
=== Middlesex === Representation increased from 18 to 47 MPs † Formed part of "The Metropolis" of London
Boroughs
Before 1885	Change	After 1885
Chelsea (2 MPs)†	Divided into four parliamentary boroughs, three of which returned 1 MP each, and one (Kensington) was itself divided into two single-member divisions.	Chelsea (1 MP)†
Chelsea (2 MPs)†	Divided into four parliamentary boroughs, three of which returned 1 MP each, and one (Kensington) was itself divided into two single-member divisions.	Fulham (1 MP)†
Chelsea (2 MPs)†	Divided into four parliamentary boroughs, three of which returned 1 MP each, and one (Kensington) was itself divided into two single-member divisions.	Hammersmith (1 MP)†
Chelsea (2 MPs)†	Divided into four parliamentary boroughs, three of which returned 1 MP each, and one (Kensington) was itself divided into two single-member divisions.	Kensington, North Division (1 MP)†
Chelsea (2 MPs)†	Divided into four parliamentary boroughs, three of which returned 1 MP each, and one (Kensington) was itself divided into two single-member divisions.	Kensington, South Division (1 MP)†
City of London (4 MPs)†	Representation reduced to two MPs	City of London (2 MPs)†
Finsbury (2 MPs)†	Divided into two parliamentary boroughs: Finsbury, consisting of 3 single-member divisions; and Islington divided into 4 single-member divisions.	Finsbury, Central Division (1 MP)†
Finsbury (2 MPs)†	Divided into two parliamentary boroughs: Finsbury, consisting of 3 single-member divisions; and Islington divided into 4 single-member divisions.	Finsbury, East Division (1 MP)†
Finsbury (2 MPs)†	Divided into two parliamentary boroughs: Finsbury, consisting of 3 single-member divisions; and Islington divided into 4 single-member divisions.	Finsbury, Holborn Division (1 MP)†
Finsbury (2 MPs)†	Divided into two parliamentary boroughs: Finsbury, consisting of 3 single-member divisions; and Islington divided into 4 single-member divisions.	Islington, East Division (1 MP)†
Finsbury (2 MPs)†	Divided into two parliamentary boroughs: Finsbury, consisting of 3 single-member divisions; and Islington divided into 4 single-member divisions.	Islington, North Division (1 MP)†
Finsbury (2 MPs)†	Divided into two parliamentary boroughs: Finsbury, consisting of 3 single-member divisions; and Islington divided into 4 single-member divisions.	Islington, South Division (1 MP)†
Finsbury (2 MPs)†	Divided into two parliamentary boroughs: Finsbury, consisting of 3 single-member divisions; and Islington divided into 4 single-member divisions.	Islington, West Division (1 MP)†
Hackney (2 MPs)†	Divided into three parliamentary boroughs: Bethnal Green (divided into 2 one-member divisions), Hackney (divided into 3 one-member divisions) and Shoreditch (divided into 2 one-member divisions)	Bethnal Green, North East Division (1 MP)†
Hackney (2 MPs)†	Divided into three parliamentary boroughs: Bethnal Green (divided into 2 one-member divisions), Hackney (divided into 3 one-member divisions) and Shoreditch (divided into 2 one-member divisions)	Bethnal Green, South West Division (1 MP)†
Hackney (2 MPs)†	Divided into three parliamentary boroughs: Bethnal Green (divided into 2 one-member divisions), Hackney (divided into 3 one-member divisions) and Shoreditch (divided into 2 one-member divisions)	Hackney, Central Division (1 MP)†
Hackney (2 MPs)†	Divided into three parliamentary boroughs: Bethnal Green (divided into 2 one-member divisions), Hackney (divided into 3 one-member divisions) and Shoreditch (divided into 2 one-member divisions)	Hackney, North Division (1 MP)†
Hackney (2 MPs)†	Divided into three parliamentary boroughs: Bethnal Green (divided into 2 one-member divisions), Hackney (divided into 3 one-member divisions) and Shoreditch (divided into 2 one-member divisions)	Hackney, South Division (1 MP)†
Hackney (2 MPs)†	Divided into three parliamentary boroughs: Bethnal Green (divided into 2 one-member divisions), Hackney (divided into 3 one-member divisions) and Shoreditch (divided into 2 one-member divisions)	Shoreditch, Haggerston Division (1 MP)†
Hackney (2 MPs)†	Divided into three parliamentary boroughs: Bethnal Green (divided into 2 one-member divisions), Hackney (divided into 3 one-member divisions) and Shoreditch (divided into 2 one-member divisions)	Shoreditch, Hoxton Division (1 MP)†
Created from part of parliamentary county	New parliamentary borough of Hampstead	Hampstead (1 MP)†
Marylebone (2 MPs)†	Divided into three parliamentary boroughs: Marylebone (divided into 2 divisions), Paddington (2 divisions) and St Pancras (4 divisions).	Marylebone, East Division (1 MP)†
Marylebone (2 MPs)†	Divided into three parliamentary boroughs: Marylebone (divided into 2 divisions), Paddington (2 divisions) and St Pancras (4 divisions).	Marylebone, West Division (1 MP)†
Marylebone (2 MPs)†	Divided into three parliamentary boroughs: Marylebone (divided into 2 divisions), Paddington (2 divisions) and St Pancras (4 divisions).	Paddington, North Division (1 MP)†
Marylebone (2 MPs)†	Divided into three parliamentary boroughs: Marylebone (divided into 2 divisions), Paddington (2 divisions) and St Pancras (4 divisions).	Paddington, South Division (1 MP)†
Marylebone (2 MPs)†	Divided into three parliamentary boroughs: Marylebone (divided into 2 divisions), Paddington (2 divisions) and St Pancras (4 divisions).	St Pancras, East Division (1 MP)†
Marylebone (2 MPs)†	Divided into three parliamentary boroughs: Marylebone (divided into 2 divisions), Paddington (2 divisions) and St Pancras (4 divisions).	St Pancras, North Division (1 MP)†
Marylebone (2 MPs)†	Divided into three parliamentary boroughs: Marylebone (divided into 2 divisions), Paddington (2 divisions) and St Pancras (4 divisions).	St Pancras, South Division (1 MP)†
Marylebone (2 MPs)†	Divided into three parliamentary boroughs: Marylebone (divided into 2 divisions), Paddington (2 divisions) and St Pancras (4 divisions).	St Pancras, West Division (1 MP)†
Tower Hamlets (2 MPs)†	Divided into 7 single-member divisions.	Bow and Bromley (1 MP)†
Tower Hamlets (2 MPs)†	Divided into 7 single-member divisions.	Limehouse Division (1 MP)†
Tower Hamlets (2 MPs)†	Divided into 7 single-member divisions.	Mile End Division (1 MP)†
Tower Hamlets (2 MPs)†	Divided into 7 single-member divisions.	Poplar Division (1 MP)†
Tower Hamlets (2 MPs)†	Divided into 7 single-member divisions.	St George Division (1 MP)†
Tower Hamlets (2 MPs)†	Divided into 7 single-member divisions.	Stepney Division (1 MP)†
Tower Hamlets (2 MPs)†	Divided into 7 single-member divisions.	Whitechapel Division (1 MP)†
Westminster (2 MPs)†	Divided into three parliamentary boroughs, each returning one MP.	Westminster (1 MP)†
Westminster (2 MPs)†	Divided into three parliamentary boroughs, each returning one MP.	St George, Hanover Square (1 MP)†
Westminster (2 MPs)†	Divided into three parliamentary boroughs, each returning one MP.	Strand (1 MP)†
County Divisions
Before 1885	Change	After 1885
Middlesex (2 MPs)	Divided into seven single-member divisions, part constituted as new parliamentary borough of Hampstead.	Brentford Division (1 MP)
Middlesex (2 MPs)	Divided into seven single-member divisions, part constituted as new parliamentary borough of Hampstead.	Ealing Division (1 MP)
Middlesex (2 MPs)	Divided into seven single-member divisions, part constituted as new parliamentary borough of Hampstead.	Enfield Division (1 MP)
Middlesex (2 MPs)	Divided into seven single-member divisions, part constituted as new parliamentary borough of Hampstead.	Harrow Division (1 MP)
Middlesex (2 MPs)	Divided into seven single-member divisions, part constituted as new parliamentary borough of Hampstead.	Hornsey Division (1 MP)
Middlesex (2 MPs)	Divided into seven single-member divisions, part constituted as new parliamentary borough of Hampstead.	Tottenham Division (1 MP)
Middlesex (2 MPs)	Divided into seven single-member divisions, part constituted as new parliamentary borough of Hampstead.	Uxbridge Division (1 MP)
=== Norfolk === Representation unchanged (10 MPs) ‡ The Borough of Great Yarmouth was partly in Suffolk
Boroughs
Before 1885	Change	After 1885
King's Lynn (2 MPs)	Representation reduced to one MP. Boundaries extended to include entire municipal borough.	King's Lynn (1 MP)
Norwich (2 MPs)	No change	Norwich (2 MPs)
Formed from part of North Division of the county	New parliamentary borough of Great Yarmouth	Great Yarmouth‡ (1 MP)
County Divisions
Before 1885	Change	After 1885
North Division (2 MPs)	Reorganised into six single-member divisions, part constituted as new parliamentary borough of Great Yarmouth.	Eastern Division (1 MP)
North Division (2 MPs)	Reorganised into six single-member divisions, part constituted as new parliamentary borough of Great Yarmouth.	Mid Division (1 MP)
South Division (2 MPs)	Reorganised into six single-member divisions, part constituted as new parliamentary borough of Great Yarmouth.	North Division (1 MP)
South Division (2 MPs)	Reorganised into six single-member divisions, part constituted as new parliamentary borough of Great Yarmouth.	North West Division (1 MP)
West Division (2 MPs)	Reorganised into six single-member divisions, part constituted as new parliamentary borough of Great Yarmouth.	South Division (1 MP)
West Division (2 MPs)	Reorganised into six single-member divisions, part constituted as new parliamentary borough of Great Yarmouth.	South West Division (1 MP)
=== Northamptonshire === Representation decreased from 8 to 7 MPs
Boroughs
Before 1885	Change	After 1885
Peterborough (2 MPs)	Representation reduced to one MP.	Peterborough (1 MP)
Northampton (2 MPs)	No change	Northampton (2 MPs)
County Divisions
Before 1885	Change	After 1885
Northern Division (2 MPs)	Reorganised into four single-member divisions.	Eastern Division (1 MP)
Northern Division (2 MPs)	Reorganised into four single-member divisions.	Mid Division (1 MP)
Southern Division (2 MPs)	Reorganised into four single-member divisions.	Northern Division (1 MP)
Southern Division (2 MPs)	Reorganised into four single-member divisions.	Southern Division (1 MP)
=== Northumberland === Representation decreased from 10 to 8 MPs
Boroughs
Before 1885	Change	After 1885
Berwick-upon-Tweed (2 MPs)	Abolished. Gave its name to a county division.	
Morpeth (1 MP)	No change	Morpeth (1 MP)
Newcastle-upon-Tyne (2 MPs)	No change	Newcastle-upon-Tyne (2 MPs)
Tynemouth and North Shields (1 MP)	Renamed	Tynemouth (1 MP)
County Divisions
Before 1885	Change	After 1885
Northern Division (2 MPs)	Reorganised into four single-member divisions.	Berwick-upon-Tweed Division (1 MP)
Northern Division (2 MPs)	Reorganised into four single-member divisions.	Hexham Division (1 MP)
Southern Division (2 MPs)	Reorganised into four single-member divisions.	Tyneside Division (1 MP)
Southern Division (2 MPs)	Reorganised into four single-member divisions.	Wansbeck Division (1 MP)
=== Nottinghamshire === Representation decreased from 10 to 7 MPs ‡ The Borough of East Retford was partly in the West Riding of Yorkshire
Boroughs
Before 1885	Change	After 1885
East Retford‡ (2 MPs)	Abolished	
Newark (2 MPs)	Abolished. Gave its name to a county division.	
Nottingham (2 MPs)	Boundaries extended to include entire municipal borough. Divided into three single-member divisions.	East Division (1 MP)
Nottingham (2 MPs)	Boundaries extended to include entire municipal borough. Divided into three single-member divisions.	South Division (1 MP)
Nottingham (2 MPs)	Boundaries extended to include entire municipal borough. Divided into three single-member divisions.	West Division (1 MP)
County Divisions
Before 1885	Change	After 1885
Northern Division (2 MPs)	Reorganised into four single-member divisions, absorbed parliamentary boroughs of East Retford and Newark.	Bassetlaw Division (1 MP)
Northern Division (2 MPs)	Reorganised into four single-member divisions, absorbed parliamentary boroughs of East Retford and Newark.	Mansfield Division (1 MP)
Southern Division (2 MPs)	Reorganised into four single-member divisions, absorbed parliamentary boroughs of East Retford and Newark.	Newark Division (1 MP)
Southern Division (2 MPs)	Reorganised into four single-member divisions, absorbed parliamentary boroughs of East Retford and Newark.	Rushcliffe Division (1 MP)
=== Oxfordshire === Representation decreased from 7 to 4 MPs ‡ The Borough of Banbury was partly in Northamptonshire
Boroughs
Before 1885	Change	After 1885
Banbury‡ (1 MP)	Abolished. Gave its name to a county division.	
Oxford (2 MPs)	Representation reduced to one MP.	Oxford (1 MP)
Woodstock (1 MP)	Abolished. Gave its name to a county division.	
County Divisions
Before 1885	Change	After 1885
Oxfordshire (3 MPs)	Divided into three single-member divisions, absorbing parliamentary boroughs of Banbury and Woodstock.	Northern or Banbury Division (1 MP)
Oxfordshire (3 MPs)	Divided into three single-member divisions, absorbing parliamentary boroughs of Banbury and Woodstock.	Mid or Woodstock Division (1 MP)
Oxfordshire (3 MPs)	Divided into three single-member divisions, absorbing parliamentary boroughs of Banbury and Woodstock.	Southern or Henley Division (1 MP)
=== Rutland === Representation reduced from 2 MPs to 1
Parliamentary County
Before 1885	Change	After 1885
Rutland (2 MPs)	Representation reduced to one MP	Rutland (1 MP)
=== Shropshire === Representation decreased from 10 to 5 MPs
Boroughs
Before 1885	Change	After 1885
Bridgnorth (1 MP)	Abolished.	
Ludlow (1 MP)	Abolished. Gave its name to a county division.	
Shrewsbury (2 MPs)	Representation reduced to one MP	Shrewsbury (1 MP)
Wenlock (2 MPs)	Abolished.	
County Divisions
Before 1885	Change	After 1885
Northern Division (2 MPs)	Reorganised as four single-member divisions, absorbing abolished parliamentary boroughs of Bridgnorth, Ludlow and Wenlock.	Mid or Wellington Division (1 MP)
Northern Division (2 MPs)	Reorganised as four single-member divisions, absorbing abolished parliamentary boroughs of Bridgnorth, Ludlow and Wenlock.	Northern or Newport Division (1 MP)
Southern Division (2 MPs)	Reorganised as four single-member divisions, absorbing abolished parliamentary boroughs of Bridgnorth, Ludlow and Wenlock.	Southern or Ludlow Division (1 MP)
Southern Division (2 MPs)	Reorganised as four single-member divisions, absorbing abolished parliamentary boroughs of Bridgnorth, Ludlow and Wenlock.	Western or Oswestry Division (1 MP)
=== Somerset === Representation decreased from 11 to 10 MPs
Boroughs
Before 1885	Change	After 1885
Bath (2 MPs)	No change	Bath (2 MPs)
Frome (1 MP)	Abolished. Gave its name to a county division.	
Taunton (2 MPs)	Representation reduced to one MP.	Taunton (1 MP)
County Divisions
Before 1885	Change	After 1885
East Division (2 MPs)	Reorganised as seven single-member divisions.	Bridgwater Division (1 MP)
East Division (2 MPs)	Reorganised as seven single-member divisions.	Eastern Division (1 MP)
Mid Division (2 MPs)	Reorganised as seven single-member divisions.	Frome Division (1 MP)
Mid Division (2 MPs)	Reorganised as seven single-member divisions.	Northern Division (1 MP)
Western Division (2 MPs)	Reorganised as seven single-member divisions.	Southern Division (1 MP)
Western Division (2 MPs)	Reorganised as seven single-member divisions.	Wells Division (1 MP)
Western Division (2 MPs)	Reorganised as seven single-member divisions.	Western or Wellington Division (1 MP)
=== Staffordshire === Representation decreased from 19 to 17 MPs ‡ The Borough of Tamworth was partly in Warwickshire
Boroughs
Before 1885	Change	After 1885
Lichfield (1 MP)	Abolished. Gave its name to a county division.	
Newcastle-under-Lyme (2 MPs)	Representation reduced to one MP. Boundaries extended to include entire municipal borough, Tunstall local government district and part of the parish of Wolstanton.	Newcastle-under-Lyme (1 MP)
Stafford (2 MPs)	Representation reduced to one MP. Boundaries extended to include entire municipal borough.	Stafford (1 MP)
Stoke-upon-Trent (2 MPs)	Divided into two new parliamentary boroughs.	Stoke upon Trent (1 MP)
Stoke-upon-Trent (2 MPs)	Divided into two new parliamentary boroughs.	Hanley (1 MP)
Tamworth‡ (2 MPs)	Abolished. Gave its name to a county division of Warwickshire.	
Walsall (1 MP)	No change	Walsall (1 MP)
Wednesbury (1 MP)	Divided into two new parliamentary boroughs.	Wednesbury (1 MP)
Wednesbury (1 MP)	Divided into two new parliamentary boroughs.	West Bromwich (1 MP)
Wolverhampton (2 MPs)	Divided into three single-member divisions.	East Division (1 MP)
Wolverhampton (2 MPs)	Divided into three single-member divisions.	South Division (1 MP)
Wolverhampton (2 MPs)	Divided into three single-member divisions.	West Division (1 MP)
County Divisions
Before 1885	Change	After 1885
East Division (2 MPs)	Reorganised into seven single-member divisions.	Burton Division (1 MP)
East Division (2 MPs)	Reorganised into seven single-member divisions.	Handsworth Division (1 MP)
North Division (2 MPs)	Reorganised into seven single-member divisions.	Kingswinford Division (1 MP)
North Division (2 MPs)	Reorganised into seven single-member divisions.	Leek Division (1 MP)
West Division (2 MPs)	Reorganised into seven single-member divisions.	Lichfield Division (1 MP)
West Division (2 MPs)	Reorganised into seven single-member divisions.	North-Western Division (1 MP)
West Division (2 MPs)	Reorganised into seven single-member divisions.	Western Division (1 MP)
=== Suffolk === Representation decreased from 9 to 8 MPs
Boroughs
Before 1885	Change	After 1885
Bury St Edmunds (2 MPs)	Representation reduced to one MP.	Bury St Edmunds (1 MP)
Eye (1 MP)	Abolished. Gave its name to a county division.	
Ipswich (2 MPs)	No change	Ipswich (2 MPs)
County Divisions
Before 1885	Change	After 1885
Eastern Division of Suffolk (2 MPs)	Reorganised into five single-member divisions, absorbing parliamentary borough of Eye.	Northern or Lowestoft Division (1 MP)
Eastern Division of Suffolk (2 MPs)	Reorganised into five single-member divisions, absorbing parliamentary borough of Eye.	North-Eastern or Eye Division (1 MP)
Eastern Division of Suffolk (2 MPs)	Reorganised into five single-member divisions, absorbing parliamentary borough of Eye.	North-Western or Stowmarket Division (1 MP)
Western Division of Suffolk (2 MPs)	Reorganised into five single-member divisions, absorbing parliamentary borough of Eye.	South or Sudbury Division (1 MP)
Western Division of Suffolk (2 MPs)	Reorganised into five single-member divisions, absorbing parliamentary borough of Eye.	South-Eastern or Woodbridge Division (1 MP)
=== Surrey === Representation increased from 11 to 22 MPs † Formed part of "The Metropolis" of London
Boroughs
Before 1885	Change	After 1885
Created from parts of the Eastern and Mid Divisions of parliamentary county	New parliamentary borough of Battersea and Clapham formed from the parish of Battersea from Mid Division and the parish of Clapham from Eastern Division. Divided into two single-member divisions.	Battersea and Clapham, Battersea Division (1 MP)†
Created from parts of the Eastern and Mid Divisions of parliamentary county	New parliamentary borough of Battersea and Clapham formed from the parish of Battersea from Mid Division and the parish of Clapham from Eastern Division. Divided into two single-member divisions.	Battersea and Clapham, Clapham Division (1 MP)†
Created from part of Eastern Division of parliamentary county	New parliamentary borough of Croydon	Croydon (1 MP)
Guildford (1 MP)	Abolished. Gave its name to a county division.	
Lambeth (2 MPs)†	Reconstituted as three new parliamentary boroughs: Camberwell (incorporating Dulwich from the Eastern Division of county), Lambeth and Newington. The three boroughs were divided into nine single-member divisions.	Camberwell, Dulwich Division (1 MP)†
Lambeth (2 MPs)†	Reconstituted as three new parliamentary boroughs: Camberwell (incorporating Dulwich from the Eastern Division of county), Lambeth and Newington. The three boroughs were divided into nine single-member divisions.	Camberwell, North Division (1 MP)†
Lambeth (2 MPs)†	Reconstituted as three new parliamentary boroughs: Camberwell (incorporating Dulwich from the Eastern Division of county), Lambeth and Newington. The three boroughs were divided into nine single-member divisions.	Camberwell, Peckham Division (1 MP)†
Lambeth (2 MPs)†	Reconstituted as three new parliamentary boroughs: Camberwell (incorporating Dulwich from the Eastern Division of county), Lambeth and Newington. The three boroughs were divided into nine single-member divisions.	Lambeth, Brixton Division (1 MP)†
Lambeth (2 MPs)†	Reconstituted as three new parliamentary boroughs: Camberwell (incorporating Dulwich from the Eastern Division of county), Lambeth and Newington. The three boroughs were divided into nine single-member divisions.	Lambeth, Kennington Division (1 MP)†
Lambeth (2 MPs)†	Reconstituted as three new parliamentary boroughs: Camberwell (incorporating Dulwich from the Eastern Division of county), Lambeth and Newington. The three boroughs were divided into nine single-member divisions.	Lambeth, North Division (1 MP)†
Lambeth (2 MPs)†	Reconstituted as three new parliamentary boroughs: Camberwell (incorporating Dulwich from the Eastern Division of county), Lambeth and Newington. The three boroughs were divided into nine single-member divisions.	Lambeth, Norwood Division (1 MP)†
Lambeth (2 MPs)†	Reconstituted as three new parliamentary boroughs: Camberwell (incorporating Dulwich from the Eastern Division of county), Lambeth and Newington. The three boroughs were divided into nine single-member divisions.	Newington, Walworth Division (1 MP)†
Lambeth (2 MPs)†	Reconstituted as three new parliamentary boroughs: Camberwell (incorporating Dulwich from the Eastern Division of county), Lambeth and Newington. The three boroughs were divided into nine single-member divisions.	Newington, West Division (1 MP)†
Southwark (2 MPs)†	Representation increased to three members; divided into three single-member divisions.	Southwark, Bermondsey Division (1 MP)†
Southwark (2 MPs)†	Representation increased to three members; divided into three single-member divisions.	Southwark, Rotherhithe Division (1 MP)†
Southwark (2 MPs)†	Representation increased to three members; divided into three single-member divisions.	Southwark, West Division (1 MP)†
Created from parts of the Eastern and Mid Divisions of parliamentary county	New parliamentary borough of Wandsworth	Wandsworth (1 MP)†
County Divisions
Before 1885	Change	After 1885
Eastern Division (2 MPs), Mid Division (2 MPs) and Western Division (2 MPs)	Reorganised into six single-member divisions.	Kingston Division (1 MP)
Eastern Division (2 MPs), Mid Division (2 MPs) and Western Division (2 MPs)	Reorganised into six single-member divisions.	Mid or Epsom Division (1 MP)
Eastern Division (2 MPs), Mid Division (2 MPs) and Western Division (2 MPs)	Reorganised into six single-member divisions.	North-Eastern or Wimbledon Division (1 MP)
Eastern Division (2 MPs), Mid Division (2 MPs) and Western Division (2 MPs)	Reorganised into six single-member divisions.	North-Western or Chertsey Division (1 MP)
Eastern Division (2 MPs), Mid Division (2 MPs) and Western Division (2 MPs)	Reorganised into six single-member divisions.	South-Eastern or Reigate Division (1 MP)
Eastern Division (2 MPs), Mid Division (2 MPs) and Western Division (2 MPs)	Reorganised into six single-member divisions.	South-Western or Guildford Division (1 MP)
=== Sussex === Representation decreased from 15 to 9 MPs
Boroughs
Before 1885	Change	After 1885
Brighton (2 MPs)	No change	Brighton (2 MPs)
Chichester (1 MP)	Abolished. Gave its name to a county division.	
Hastings (2 MPs)	Boundaries altered. Representation reduced to 1 MP.	Hastings (1 MP)
Horsham (1 MP)	Abolished. Gave its name to a county division.	
Lewes (1 MP)	Abolished. Gave its name to a county division.	
Midhurst (1 MP)	Abolished.	
New Shoreham (2 MPs)	Abolished.	
Rye (1 MP)	Abolished. Gave its name to a county division.	
County Divisions
Before 1885	Change	After 1885
Eastern Division (2 MPs)	Absorbed abolished parliamentary boroughs of Chichester, Horsham, Lewes, Midhurst, New Shoreham and Rye. Reorganised into six single-member divisions.	Eastern or Rye Division (1 MP)
Eastern Division (2 MPs)	Absorbed abolished parliamentary boroughs of Chichester, Horsham, Lewes, Midhurst, New Shoreham and Rye. Reorganised into six single-member divisions.	Mid or Lewes Division (1 MP)
Eastern Division (2 MPs)	Absorbed abolished parliamentary boroughs of Chichester, Horsham, Lewes, Midhurst, New Shoreham and Rye. Reorganised into six single-member divisions.	Northern or East Grinstead Division (1 MP)
Western Division (2 MPs)	Absorbed abolished parliamentary boroughs of Chichester, Horsham, Lewes, Midhurst, New Shoreham and Rye. Reorganised into six single-member divisions.	North-Western or Horsham Division (1 MP)
Western Division (2 MPs)	Absorbed abolished parliamentary boroughs of Chichester, Horsham, Lewes, Midhurst, New Shoreham and Rye. Reorganised into six single-member divisions.	Southern or Eastbourne Division (1 MP)
Western Division (2 MPs)	Absorbed abolished parliamentary boroughs of Chichester, Horsham, Lewes, Midhurst, New Shoreham and Rye. Reorganised into six single-member divisions.	South-Western or Chichester Division (1 MP)
=== Warwickshire === Representation increased from 11 to 14 MPs
Boroughs
Before 1885	Change	After 1885
Created from part of Northern Division of parliamentary county	New parliamentary borough of Aston Manor	Aston Manor (1 MP)
Birmingham (3 MPs)	Boundaries of parliamentary borough extended to include local government districts of Balsall Heath, Harborne, and Saltley, and the hamlet of Little Bromwich. Representation increased to seven MPs, divided into seven single-member divisions.	Birmingham, Bordesley Division (1 MP)
Birmingham (3 MPs)	Boundaries of parliamentary borough extended to include local government districts of Balsall Heath, Harborne, and Saltley, and the hamlet of Little Bromwich. Representation increased to seven MPs, divided into seven single-member divisions.	Birmingham, Central Division (1 MP)
Birmingham (3 MPs)	Boundaries of parliamentary borough extended to include local government districts of Balsall Heath, Harborne, and Saltley, and the hamlet of Little Bromwich. Representation increased to seven MPs, divided into seven single-member divisions.	Birmingham, East Division (1 MP)
Birmingham (3 MPs)	Boundaries of parliamentary borough extended to include local government districts of Balsall Heath, Harborne, and Saltley, and the hamlet of Little Bromwich. Representation increased to seven MPs, divided into seven single-member divisions.	Birmingham, Edgbaston Division (1 MP)
Birmingham (3 MPs)	Boundaries of parliamentary borough extended to include local government districts of Balsall Heath, Harborne, and Saltley, and the hamlet of Little Bromwich. Representation increased to seven MPs, divided into seven single-member divisions.	Birmingham, North Division (1 MP)
Birmingham (3 MPs)	Boundaries of parliamentary borough extended to include local government districts of Balsall Heath, Harborne, and Saltley, and the hamlet of Little Bromwich. Representation increased to seven MPs, divided into seven single-member divisions.	Birmingham, South Division (1 MP)
Birmingham (3 MPs)	Boundaries of parliamentary borough extended to include local government districts of Balsall Heath, Harborne, and Saltley, and the hamlet of Little Bromwich. Representation increased to seven MPs, divided into seven single-member divisions.	Birmingham, West Division (1 MP)
Coventry (2 MPs)	Representation reduced to one MP.	Coventry (1 MP)
Warwick (2 MPs)	Parliamentary Borough of Warwick extended to include the municipal borough of Royal Leamington Spa and the local government districts of Milverton and Lillington. Representation reduced to one MP.	Warwick and Leamington (1 MP)
County Divisions
Before 1885	Change	After 1885
Northern Division (2 MPs)	Reorganised into four single-member divisions.	Northern or Tamworth Division (1 MP)
Northern Division (2 MPs)	Reorganised into four single-member divisions.	North-Eastern or Nuneaton Division (1 MP)
Southern Division (2 MPs)	Reorganised into four single-member divisions.	South-Eastern or Rugby Division (1 MP)
Southern Division (2 MPs)	Reorganised into four single-member divisions.	South Western or Stratford on Avon Division (1 MP)
=== Westmorland === Representation decreased from 3 to 2 MPs
Boroughs
Before 1885	Change	After 1885
Kendal (1 MP)	Abolished. Gave its name to a county division.	
County Divisions
Before 1885	Change	After 1885
Westmorland (2 MPs)	Reorganised into two single-member divisions, absorbing abolished parliamentary borough of Kendal.	Northern or Appleby Division (1 MP)
Westmorland (2 MPs)	Reorganised into two single-member divisions, absorbing abolished parliamentary borough of Kendal.	Southern or Kendal Division (1 MP)
=== Wiltshire === Representation decreased from 15 to 6 MPs ‡ The Borough of Cricklade was partly in Gloucestershire
Boroughs
Before 1885	Change	After 1885
Calne (1 MP)	Abolished.	
Chippenham (1 MP)	Abolished. Gave its name to a county division.	
Cricklade‡ (2 MPs)	Abolished. Gave its name to a county division.	
Devizes (1 MP)	Abolished. Gave its name to a county division.	
Malmesbury (1 MP)	Abolished.	
Marlborough (1 MP)	Abolished.	
Salisbury (2 MPs)	Boundaries extended to include entire parish of Fisherton Anger, part of the parish of Milford. Representation reduced to one MP.	Salisbury (1 MP)
Westbury (1 MP)	Abolished. Gave its name to a county division.	
Wilton (1 MP)	Abolished. Gave its name to a county division.	
County Divisions
Before 1885	Change	After 1885
Northern Division (2 MPs)	Reorganised as five single-member divisions, absorbing the abolished parliamentary boroughs of Calne, Chippenham, Cricklade, Devizes, Malmesbury, Marlborough, Westbury and Wilton.	Eastern or Devizes Division (1 MP)
Northern Division (2 MPs)	Reorganised as five single-member divisions, absorbing the abolished parliamentary boroughs of Calne, Chippenham, Cricklade, Devizes, Malmesbury, Marlborough, Westbury and Wilton.	Northern or Cricklade Division (1 MP)
Northern Division (2 MPs)	Reorganised as five single-member divisions, absorbing the abolished parliamentary boroughs of Calne, Chippenham, Cricklade, Devizes, Malmesbury, Marlborough, Westbury and Wilton.	North-Western or Chippenham Division (1 MP)
Southern Division (2 MPs)	Reorganised as five single-member divisions, absorbing the abolished parliamentary boroughs of Calne, Chippenham, Cricklade, Devizes, Malmesbury, Marlborough, Westbury and Wilton.	Southern or Wilton Division (1 MP)
Southern Division (2 MPs)	Reorganised as five single-member divisions, absorbing the abolished parliamentary boroughs of Calne, Chippenham, Cricklade, Devizes, Malmesbury, Marlborough, Westbury and Wilton.	Western or Westbury Division (1 MP)
=== Worcestershire === Representation decreased from 11 to 8 MPs
Boroughs
Before 1885	Change	After 1885
Bewdley (1 MP)	Abolished. Gave its name to a county division.	
Droitwich (1 MP)	Abolished. Gave its name to a county division.	
Dudley (1 MP)	No change	Dudley (1 MP)
Evesham (1 MP)	Abolished. Gave its name to a county division.	
Kidderminster (1 MP)	No change	Kidderminster (1 MP)
Worcester (2 MPs)	Representation reduced to one MP.	Worcester (1 MP)
County Divisions
Before 1885	Change	After 1885
Eastern Division (2 MPs)	Reorganised as five single-member divisions, absorbing the abolished parliamentary boroughs of Bewdley, Droitwich and Evesham.	Eastern Division (1 MP)
Eastern Division (2 MPs)	Reorganised as five single-member divisions, absorbing the abolished parliamentary boroughs of Bewdley, Droitwich and Evesham.	Mid or Droitwich Division (1 MP)
Eastern Division (2 MPs)	Reorganised as five single-member divisions, absorbing the abolished parliamentary boroughs of Bewdley, Droitwich and Evesham.	Northern Division (one MP
Western Division (2 MPs)	Reorganised as five single-member divisions, absorbing the abolished parliamentary boroughs of Bewdley, Droitwich and Evesham.	Southern or Evesham Division (1 MP)
Western Division (2 MPs)	Reorganised as five single-member divisions, absorbing the abolished parliamentary boroughs of Bewdley, Droitwich and Evesham.	Western or Bewdley Division (1 MP)
=== Yorkshire === Representation increased from 38 to 52 MPs
Boroughs
Before 1885	Change	After 1885
Bradford (2 MPs)	Boundaries widened to include entire municipal borough. Representation increased to three MPs, divided into three single-member divisions.	Bradford, Central Division (1 MP)
Bradford (2 MPs)	Boundaries widened to include entire municipal borough. Representation increased to three MPs, divided into three single-member divisions.	Bradford, East Division (1 MP)
Bradford (2 MPs)	Boundaries widened to include entire municipal borough. Representation increased to three MPs, divided into three single-member divisions.	Bradford, West Division (1 MP)
Dewsbury (1 MP)	No change	Dewsbury (1 MP)
Halifax (2 MPs)	No change	Halifax (2 MPs)
Huddersfield (1 MP)	No change	Huddersfield (1 MP)
Kingston upon Hull (2 MPs)	Boundaries extended to include entire municipal borough. Representation increased to three MPs, divided into three single-member divisions.	Kingston upon Hull Central Division (1 MP)
Kingston upon Hull (2 MPs)	Boundaries extended to include entire municipal borough. Representation increased to three MPs, divided into three single-member divisions.	Kingston upon Hull East Division (1 MP)
Kingston upon Hull (2 MPs)	Boundaries extended to include entire municipal borough. Representation increased to three MPs, divided into three single-member divisions.	Kingston upon Hull West Division (1 MP)
Knaresborough (1 MP)	Abolished	
Leeds (3 MPs)	Representation increased to five MPs, divided into five single-member divisions.	Leeds, Central Division (1 MP)
Leeds (3 MPs)	Representation increased to five MPs, divided into five single-member divisions.	Leeds, East Division (1 MP)
Leeds (3 MPs)	Representation increased to five MPs, divided into five single-member divisions.	Leeds, North Division (1 MP)
Leeds (3 MPs)	Representation increased to five MPs, divided into five single-member divisions.	Leeds, South Division (1 MP)
Leeds (3 MPs)	Representation increased to five MPs, divided into five single-member divisions.	Leeds, West Division (1 MP)
Malton (1 MP)	Abolished Gave its name (with Thirsk) to a county division.	
Middlesbrough (1 MP)	Boundaries extended to include entire municipal borough.	Middlesbrough (1 MP)
Northallerton (1 MP)	Abolished	
Pontefract (2 MPs)	Representation reduced to one member.	Pontefract (1 MP)
Richmond (1 MP)	Abolished. Gave its name to a county division.	
Ripon (1 MP)	Abolished. Gave its name to a county division.	
Scarborough (2 MPs)	Representation reduced to one member.	Scarborough (1 MP)
Sheffield (2 MPs)	Representation increased to five MPs. Divided into five single-member divisions.	Sheffield, Attercliffe Division (1 MP)
Sheffield (2 MPs)	Representation increased to five MPs. Divided into five single-member divisions.	Sheffield, Brightside Division (1 MP)
Sheffield (2 MPs)	Representation increased to five MPs. Divided into five single-member divisions.	Sheffield, Central Division (1 MP)
Sheffield (2 MPs)	Representation increased to five MPs. Divided into five single-member divisions.	Sheffield, Ecclesall Division (1 MP)
Sheffield (2 MPs)	Representation increased to five MPs. Divided into five single-member divisions.	Sheffield, Hallam Division (1 MP)
Thirsk (1 MP)	Abolished. Gave its name (with Malton) to a county division.	
Wakefield (1 MP)	Boundaries extended to include the Belle Vue area of the parish of Sandal Magna.	Wakefield (1 MP)
Whitby (1 MP)	Abolished. Gave its name to a county division.	
York (2 MPs)	Boundaries extended to include entire municipal borough.	York (2 MPs)
County Divisions
Before 1885	Change	After 1885
East Riding Division (2 MPs)	Divided into three single-member divisions.	Buckrose Division (1 MP)
East Riding Division (2 MPs)	Divided into three single-member divisions.	Holderness Division (1 MP)
East Riding Division (2 MPs)	Divided into three single-member divisions.	Howdenshire Division (1 MP)
North Riding Division (2 MPs)	Divided into four single-member divisions, absorbing abolished parliamentary boroughs of Malton, Northallerton, Richmond, Thirsk and Whitby.	Cleveland Division (1 MP)
North Riding Division (2 MPs)	Divided into four single-member divisions, absorbing abolished parliamentary boroughs of Malton, Northallerton, Richmond, Thirsk and Whitby.	Richmond Division (1 MP)
North Riding Division (2 MPs)	Divided into four single-member divisions, absorbing abolished parliamentary boroughs of Malton, Northallerton, Richmond, Thirsk and Whitby.	Thirsk and Malton Division (1 MP)
North Riding Division (2 MPs)	Divided into four single-member divisions, absorbing abolished parliamentary boroughs of Malton, Northallerton, Richmond, Thirsk and Whitby.	Whitby Division (1 MP)
Eastern Division of the West Riding (2 MPs)	Divided into six single-member divisions, absorbing the abolished parliamentary boroughs of Knaresborough and Ripon.	Barkston Ash Division (1 MP)
Eastern Division of the West Riding (2 MPs)	Divided into six single-member divisions, absorbing the abolished parliamentary boroughs of Knaresborough and Ripon.	Osgoldcross Division (1 MP)
Eastern Division of the West Riding (2 MPs)	Divided into six single-member divisions, absorbing the abolished parliamentary boroughs of Knaresborough and Ripon.	Otley Division (1 MP)
Eastern Division of the West Riding (2 MPs)	Divided into six single-member divisions, absorbing the abolished parliamentary boroughs of Knaresborough and Ripon.	Pudsey Division (1 MP)
Eastern Division of the West Riding (2 MPs)	Divided into six single-member divisions, absorbing the abolished parliamentary boroughs of Knaresborough and Ripon.	Ripon Division (1 MP)
Eastern Division of the West Riding (2 MPs)	Divided into six single-member divisions, absorbing the abolished parliamentary boroughs of Knaresborough and Ripon.	Spen Valley Division (1 MP)
Northern Division of the West Riding (2 MPs)	Divided into five single-member divisions.	Elland Division (1 MP)
Northern Division of the West Riding (2 MPs)	Divided into five single-member divisions.	Keighley Division (1 MP)
Northern Division of the West Riding (2 MPs)	Divided into five single-member divisions.	Shipley Division (1 MP)
Northern Division of the West Riding (2 MPs)	Divided into five single-member divisions.	Skipton Division (1 MP)
Northern Division of the West Riding (2 MPs)	Divided into five single-member divisions.	Sowerby Division (1 MP)
Southern Division of the West Riding (2 MPs)	Divided into eight single-member divisions.	Barnsley Division (1 MP)
Southern Division of the West Riding (2 MPs)	Divided into eight single-member divisions.	Colne Valley Division (1 MP)
Southern Division of the West Riding (2 MPs)	Divided into eight single-member divisions.	Doncaster Division (1 MP)
Southern Division of the West Riding (2 MPs)	Divided into eight single-member divisions.	Hallamshire Division (1 MP)
Southern Division of the West Riding (2 MPs)	Divided into eight single-member divisions.	Holmfirth Division (1 MP)
Southern Division of the West Riding (2 MPs)	Divided into eight single-member divisions.	Morley Division (1 MP)
Southern Division of the West Riding (2 MPs)	Divided into eight single-member divisions.	Normanton Division (1 MP)
Southern Division of the West Riding (2 MPs)	Divided into eight single-member divisions.	Rotherham Division (1 MP)
=== Universities === University representation was not altered by the act.
Before 1885	Change	After 1885
Cambridge University (2 MPs)	No change	Cambridge University (2 MPs)
London University (1 MP)	No change	London University (1 MP)
Oxford University (2 MPs)	No change	Oxford University (2 MPs)

== Redistributed seats: Wales ==
=== Anglesey === Representation decreased from 2 to 1 MPs
Boroughs
Before 1885	Change	After 1885
Beaumaris district of Boroughs (Amlwch, Beaumaris, Holyhead and Llangefni)	Abolished.	
County Divisions
Before 1885	Change	After 1885
Anglesey (1 MP)	Absorbed Beaumaris District of Boroughs	Anglesey (1 MP)
=== Breconshire === Representation decreased from 2 to 1 MPs
Boroughs
Before 1885	Change	After 1885
Brecon (1 MP)	Abolished.	
County Divisions
Before 1885	Change	After 1885
Breconshire (1 MP)	Absorbed abolished parliamentary borough of Brecon.	Breconshire (1 MP)
=== Cardiganshire === Representation decreased from 2 to 1 MPs ‡ The Borough of Cardigan was partly in Pembrokeshire, the Boroughs of Adpar and Lampeter were partly in Carmarthenshire
Boroughs
Before 1885	Change	After 1885
Cardigan District of Boroughs‡ (1 MP) (Cardigan, Aberystwyth, Lampeter and Adpar)	Abolished	
County Divisions
Before 1885	Change	After 1885
Cardiganshire (1 MP)	Absorbed abolished Cardigan District of Boroughs.	Cardiganshire (1 MP)
=== Carmarthenshire === Representation unchanged (3 MPs)
Boroughs
Before 1885	Change	After 1885
Carmarthen Boroughs (1 MP) (Carmarthen and Llanelly)	No change	Carmarthen Boroughs (1 MP) (Carmarthen and Llanelly)
County Divisions
Before 1885	Change	After 1885
Carmarthenshire (2 MPs)	Divided into two single-member divisions.	Eastern Division (1 MP)
Carmarthenshire (2 MPs)	Divided into two single-member divisions.	Western Division (1 MP)
=== Carnarvonshire === Representation increased from 2 to 3 MPs
Boroughs
Before 1885	Change	After 1885
Carnarvon District of Boroughs (1 MP) (Carnarvon, Bangor, Conway, Criccieth, Nevin, and Pwllheli)	No change	Carnarvon District of Boroughs (1 MP) (Carnarvon, Bangor, Conway, Criccieth, Nevin, and Pwllheli)
County Divisions
Before 1885	Change	After 1885
Carnarvonshire (1 MP)	Divided into two single-member divisions.	The Northern or Arfon Division (1 MP)
Carnarvonshire (1 MP)	Divided into two single-member divisions.	The Southern or Eifion Division (1 MP)
=== Denbighshire === Representation unchanged (3 MPs)
Boroughs
Before 1885	Change	After 1885
Denbigh Boroughs (1 MP) (Denbigh, Holt, Ruthin, and Wrexham)	No change	Denbigh Boroughs (1 MP) (Denbigh, Holt, Ruthin, and Wrexham)
County Divisions
Before 1885	Change	After 1885
Denbighshire (2 MPs)	Divided into two single-member divisions.	Eastern Division (1 MP)
Denbighshire (2 MPs)	Divided into two single-member divisions.	Western Division (1 MP)
=== Flintshire === Representation unchanged (2 MPs)
Boroughs
Before 1885	Change	After 1885
Flint Boroughs (1 MP) (Caergwrle, Caerwys, Flint, Holywell, Mold, Overton, Rhuddlan and St Asaph)	No change	Flint Boroughs (1 MP) (Caergwrle, Caerwys, Flint, Holywell, Mold, Overton, Rhuddlan and St Asaph)
County Divisions
Before 1885	Change	After 1885
Flintshire (1 MP)	No change	Flintshire (1 MP)
=== Glamorganshire === Representation increased from 6 to 10 MPs
Boroughs
Before 1885	Change	After 1885
Cardiff District of Boroughs (1 MP) (Cardiff, Cowbridge and Llantrisant)	Parliamentary Borough of Cardiff extended to include entire municipal borough.	Cardiff District of Boroughs (1 MP) (Cardiff, Cowbridge and Llantrisant)
Merthyr Tydfil (2 MPs)	No change	Merthyr Tydfil (2 MPs)
Swansea District of Boroughs (1 MP) (Aberavon, Kenfig, Loughor, Neath and Swansea)	Reconstituted as Parliamentary Borough of Swansea without alteration of boundaries. Representation increased to two MPs. Divided into two single-member divisions.	Swansea, District (1 MP) (Aberavon, Kenfig, Loughor, Neath and suburban areas of Swansea)
Swansea District of Boroughs (1 MP) (Aberavon, Kenfig, Loughor, Neath and Swansea)	Reconstituted as Parliamentary Borough of Swansea without alteration of boundaries. Representation increased to two MPs. Divided into two single-member divisions.	Swansea, Town (1 MP)
County Divisions
Before 1885	Change	After 1885
Glamorganshire (2 MPs)	Divided into five single-member divisions.	Eastern Division (1 MP)
Glamorganshire (2 MPs)	Divided into five single-member divisions.	Mid Division (1 MP)
Glamorganshire (2 MPs)	Divided into five single-member divisions.	Rhondda Division (1 MP)
Glamorganshire (2 MPs)	Divided into five single-member divisions.	Southern Division (1 MP)
Glamorganshire (2 MPs)	Divided into five single-member divisions.	Western or Gower District (1 MP)
=== Merionethshire === Representation unchanged (1 MP)
County Divisions
Before 1885	Change	After 1885
Merionethshire (1 MP)	No change	Merionethshire (1 MP)
=== Monmouthshire === Representation increased from 3 to 4 MPs
Boroughs
Before 1885	Change	After 1885
Monmouth Boroughs (1 MP) (Monmouth, Newport and Usk)	Parliamentary Borough of Newport extended to include entire municipal borough.	Monmouth Boroughs (1 MP) (Monmouth, Newport and Usk)
County Divisions
Before 1885	Change	After 1885
Monmouthshire (2 MPs)	Divided into three single-member divisions.	Northern Division (1 MP)
Monmouthshire (2 MPs)	Divided into three single-member divisions.	Southern Division (1 MP)
Monmouthshire (2 MPs)	Divided into three single-member divisions.	Western Division (1 MP)
=== Montgomeryshire === Representation unchanged (2 MPs)
Boroughs
Before 1885	Change	After 1885
Montgomery District of Boroughs (1 MP) (Llanfyllin, Llanidloes, Machynlleth, Montgomery, Newtown, and Welshpool)	No change	Montgomery District of Boroughs (1 MP) (Llanfyllin, Llanidloes, Machynlleth, Montgomery, Newtown, and Welshpool)
County Divisions
Before 1885	Change	After 1885
Montgomeryshire (1 MP)	No change	Montgomeryshire (1 MP)
=== Pembrokeshire === Representation decreased from 3 to 2 MPs
Boroughs
Before 1885	Change	After 1885
Pembroke District of Boroughs (1 MP) (Pembroke, Milford, Tenby and Wiston)	Districts of parliamentary boroughs of Pembroke and Haverfordwest merged.	Pembroke and Haverfordwest District of Boroughs (1 MP) (Fishguard, Haverfordwest, Pembroke, Milford, Narberth, St David's, Tenby and Wiston)
Haverfordwest District of Boroughs (1 MP) (Fishguard, Haverfordwest, Narberth and St David's)	Districts of parliamentary boroughs of Pembroke and Haverfordwest merged.	Pembroke and Haverfordwest District of Boroughs (1 MP) (Fishguard, Haverfordwest, Pembroke, Milford, Narberth, St David's, Tenby and Wiston)
County Divisions
Before 1885	Change	After 1885
Pembrokeshire	No change	Pembrokeshire
=== Radnorshire === Representation decreased from 2 to 1 MPs
Boroughs
Before 1885	Change	After 1885
Radnor District of Boroughs (1 MP) (Cefnllys, Knighton, Knucklas, New Radnor, Presteigne and Rhayader)	Abolished.	
County Divisions
Before 1885	Change	After 1885
Radnorshire (1 MP)	Absorbed abolished parliamentary boroughs.	Radnorshire (1 MP)

== Redistributed seats: Scotland ==
=== Burghs and Districts of Burghs ===
Burghs and Districts
Before 1885	Change	After 1885
Aberdeen (1 MP)	Representation of parliamentary burgh increased to two seats. Divided into two single-member divisions.	Aberdeen, North Division (1 MP)
Aberdeen (1 MP)	Representation of parliamentary burgh increased to two seats. Divided into two single-member divisions.	Aberdeen, South Division (1 MP)
Ayr District of Burghs (1 MP)	No change. Comprised five parliamentary burghs: Ayr and Irvine in Ayrshire, and Campbeltown, Inverary and Oban in Argyllshire.	Ayr District of Burghs (1 MP)
Dundee (2 MPs)	No change.	Dundee (2 MPs)
Dumfries District of Burghs (1 MP)	No change. Comprised five parliamentary burghs: Annan Lochmaben and Sanquhar in Dumfriesshire, Dumfries in Dumfriesshire and Kirkcudbrightshire, Kirkcudbright in Kirkcudbrightshire.	Dumfries District of Burghs (1 MP)
Edinburgh (2 MPs)	Boundaries widened to include entire municipal burgh. Representation of parliamentary burgh increased to four seats. Divided into four single-member divisions.	Edinburgh, Central Division (1 MP)
Edinburgh (2 MPs)	Boundaries widened to include entire municipal burgh. Representation of parliamentary burgh increased to four seats. Divided into four single-member divisions.	Edinburgh, East Division (1 MP)
Edinburgh (2 MPs)	Boundaries widened to include entire municipal burgh. Representation of parliamentary burgh increased to four seats. Divided into four single-member divisions.	Edinburgh, South Division (1 MP)
Edinburgh (2 MPs)	Boundaries widened to include entire municipal burgh. Representation of parliamentary burgh increased to four seats. Divided into four single-member divisions.	Edinburgh, West Division (1 MP)
Elgin District of Burghs (1 MP)	No change. Comprised five parliamentary burghs: Inverurie, Kintore and Peterhead in Aberdeenshire, Banff and Cullen in Banffshire, and Elgin in Elginshire.	Elgin District of Burghs (1 MP)
Falkirk District of Burghs (1 MP)	Comprised five parliamentary burghs: Airdrie, Hamilton and Lanark in Lanarkshire, Linlithgow in Linlithgowshire and Falkirk in Stirlingshire. Boundaries widened to include entire municipal burgh of Hamilton.	Falkirk District of Burghs (1 MP)
Glasgow (3 MPs)	Boundaries widened to include entire municipal burgh. Representation of parliamentary burgh increased to seven seats. Divided into seven single-member divisions.	Glasgow, Blackfriars and Hutchesontown Division (1 MP)
Glasgow (3 MPs)	Boundaries widened to include entire municipal burgh. Representation of parliamentary burgh increased to seven seats. Divided into seven single-member divisions.	Glasgow, Bridgeton Division (1 MP)
Glasgow (3 MPs)	Boundaries widened to include entire municipal burgh. Representation of parliamentary burgh increased to seven seats. Divided into seven single-member divisions.	Glasgow, Camlachie Division (1 MP)
Glasgow (3 MPs)	Boundaries widened to include entire municipal burgh. Representation of parliamentary burgh increased to seven seats. Divided into seven single-member divisions.	Glasgow, Central Division (1 MP)
Glasgow (3 MPs)	Boundaries widened to include entire municipal burgh. Representation of parliamentary burgh increased to seven seats. Divided into seven single-member divisions.	Glasgow, College Division (1 MP)
Glasgow (3 MPs)	Boundaries widened to include entire municipal burgh. Representation of parliamentary burgh increased to seven seats. Divided into seven single-member divisions.	Glasgow, St. Rollox Division (1 MP)
Glasgow (3 MPs)	Boundaries widened to include entire municipal burgh. Representation of parliamentary burgh increased to seven seats. Divided into seven single-member divisions.	Glasgow, Tradeston Division (1 MP)
Greenock (1 MP)	Boundaries extended to include entire municipal burgh.	Greenock (1 MP)
Haddington District of Burghs (1 MP)	Abolished. The five parliamentary burghs that comprised the district were each merged into their respective parliamentary counties: Lauder into Berwickshire; Dunbar, Haddington, and North Berwick into Haddingtonshire; and Jedburgh into Roxburghshire.	
Hawick District of Burghs (1 MP)	Comprised three parliamentary burghs: Hawick in Roxburghshire and Galashiels and Selkirk in Selkirkshire. Boundaries extended to include entire municipal burgh of Hawick.	Hawick District of Burghs (1 MP)
Inverness District of Burghs (1 MP)	No change Comprised four parliamentary burghs: Forres in Elginshire, Inverness in Inverness-shire, Nairn in Nairnshire and Fortrose in Ross and Cromarty.	Inverness District of Burghs (1 MP)
Kilmarnock District of Burghs (1 MP)	Comprised five burghs: Kilmarnock in Ayrshire; Dumbarton in Dumbartonshire; Rutherglen in Lanarkshire and Renfrew and Port Glasgow in Renfrewshire. Boundaries of parliamentary burghs of Kilmarnock, Port Glasgow and Renfrew extended to include entire municipal burghs.	Kilmarnock District of Burghs (1 MP)
Kirkcaldy District of Burghs (1 MP)	Comprised four burghs in Fife: Kirkcaldy, Burntisland, Dysart, Kinghorn Extended to include entire municipal burgh of Kirkcaldy.	Kirkcaldy District of Burghs (1 MP)
Leith District of Burghs (1 MP)	No change Comprised three burghs in the County of Edinburgh: Leith, Musselburgh and Portobello.	Leith District of Burghs (1 MP)
Montrose District of Burghs (1 MP)	No change Comprised five burghs: Arbroath, Brechin, Forfar and Montrose in Forfarshire and Inverbervie in Kincardineshire.	Montrose District of Burghs (1 MP)
Paisley (1 MP)	Boundaries widened to include entire municipal burgh.	Paisley (1 MP)
Perth City (1 MP)	Boundaries widened to include entire municipal burgh.	Perth City (1 MP)
St Andrews District of Burghs (1 MP)	No change Comprised seven burghs in Fife: Anstruther Easter, Anstruther Wester, Crail, Cupar, Kilrenny, Pittenweem and St Andrews.	St Andrews District of Burghs (1 MP)
Stirling District of Burghs (1 MP)	No change Comprised five burghs: Dunfermline and Inverkeithing in Fife; Queensferry in Linlithgowshire; Culross in Perthshire and Stirling in Stirlingshire.	Stirling District of Burghs (1 MP)
Wick District of Burghs (1 MP)	No change Comprised six burghs: Wick in Caithness; Kirkwall in Orkney; Cromarty, Dingwall and Tain in Ross and Cromarty; Dornoch in Sutherland.	Wick District of Burghs (1 MP)
Wigtown District of Burghs (1 MP)	Abolished The four constituent burghs were merged into the parliamentary counties of Kirkcudbrightshire (New Galloway) and Wigtownshire (Stranraer, Whithorn and Wigtown).	
=== Aberdeenshire === Representation unchanged (2 MPs); See also the parliamentary burgh of Aberdeen and the Elgin District of Burghs which included Peterhead.
County Divisions
Before 1885	Change	After 1885
Eastern Division (1 MP)	No change.	Eastern Division (1 MP)
Western Division (1 MP)	No change.	Western Division (1 MP)
=== Argyllshire === Representation unchanged (1 MP); The parliamentary burghs in the county formed part of the Ayr District.
Before 1885	Change	After 1885
Argyllshire (1 MP)	No change.	Argyllshire (1 MP)
=== Ayrshire === Representation unchanged (2 MPs); The parliamentary burghs in the county formed parts of Ayr and Kilmarnock Districts.
County Divisions
Before 1885	Change	After 1885
Northern Division (1 MP)	No change	Northern Division (1 MP)
Southern Division (1 MP)	No change	Southern Division (1 MP)
=== Banffshire === Representation unchanged (1 MP); The parliamentary burghs in the county formed part of the Elgin District.
County Divisions
Before 1885	Change	After 1885
Banffshire (1 MP)	No change	Banffshire (1 MP)
=== Berwickshire === Representation unchanged (1 MP)
County Divisions
Before 1885	Change	After 1885
Berwickshire (1 MP)	Absorbed the abolished parliamentary burgh of Lauder, previously part of the Haddington District of Burghs.	Berwickshire (1 MP)
=== Buteshire === Representation unchanged (1 MP)
County Divisions
Before 1885	Change	After 1885
Buteshire (1 MP)	No change	Buteshire (1 MP)
=== Caithness === Representation unchanged (1 MP); The parliamentary burgh in the county formed part of the Wick District
County Divisions
Before 1885	Change	After 1885
Caithness (1 MP)	No change	Caithness (1 MP)
=== Clackmannanshire and Kinross-shire === Representation unchanged (1 MP)
County Divisions
Before 1885	Change	After 1885
Clackmannanshire and Kinross-shire (1 MP)	No change The constituency consisted of the combined parliamentary counties of Clackmannanshire and Kinross-shire, and also included the parishes of Tulliallan, Culross and Muckhart in Perthshire, the Perthshire portions of the parishes of Logie and Fossaway, and the Stirlingshire part of the parish of Alva.	Clackmannanshire and Kinross-shire (1 MP)
=== Dumfriesshire === Representation unchanged (1 MP); The parliamentary burghs in the county formed part of the Dumfries District
County Divisions
Before 1885	Change	After 1885
Dumfriesshire (1 MP)	No change	Dumfriesshire (1 MP)
=== Dumbartonshire === Representation unchanged (1 MP); The parliamentary burgh of Dumbarton formed part of Kilmarnock District
County Divisions
Before 1885	Change	After 1885
Dumbartonshire (1 MP)	No change	Dumbartonshire (1 MP)
=== County of Edinburgh === Representation unchanged (1 MP); See also the parliamentary burgh of Edinburgh and the Leith District of Burghs.
County Divisions
Before 1885	Change	After 1885
County of Edinburgh (1 MP)	No change	County of Edinburgh (1 MP)
=== Elginshire and Nairnshire === Representation unchanged (1 MP); The parliamentary burgh of Elgin formed part of Elgin District; the burghs of Forres and Nairn were part of Inverness District.
County Divisions
Before 1885	Change	After 1885
Elginshire and Nairnshire (1 MP)	No change. The constituency consisted of the combined parliamentary counties of Elginshire and Nairnshire.	Elginshire and Nairnshire (1 MP)
=== Fife === Representation increased from 1 to 2 MPs; The 13 parliamentary burghs in the county formed the Kirkcaldy District, the St Andrews District and part of the Stirling District.
County Divisions
Before 1885	Change	After 1885
Fife (1 MP)	Divided into two single-member divisions.	Fife, Eastern Division (1 MP)
Fife (1 MP)	Divided into two single-member divisions.	Fife, Western Division (1 MP)
=== Forfarshire === Representation unchanged (1 MP); See also the parliamentary burgh of Dundee and the Montrose District of Burghs.
County Divisions
Before 1885	Change	After 1885
Forfarshire (1 MP)	No Change	Forfarshire (1 MP)
=== Haddingtonshire === Representation unchanged (1 MP)
County Divisions
Before 1885	Change	After 1885
Haddingtonshire (1 MP)	Absorbed the abolished parliamentary burghs of Haddington, Dunbar, and North Berwick formerly part of the Haddington District of Burghs	Haddingtonshire (1 MP)
=== Inverness-shire === Representation unchanged (1 MP); The parliamentary burgh of Inverness formed part of the Inverness District of Burghs.
County Divisions
Before 1885	Change	After 1885
Inverness-shire (1 MP)	No change	Inverness-shire (1 MP)
=== Kincardineshire === Representation unchanged (1 MP); The parliamentary burgh of Montrose formed part of the Montrose District of Burghs.
County Divisions
Before 1885	Change	After 1885
Kincardineshire (1 MP)	No change	Kincardineshire (1 MP)
=== Kirkcudbrightshire === Representation unchanged (1 MP); The parliamentary burgh of Kirkcudbright and the burgh of Dumfries (partly in the county) formed part of Dumfries District.
County Divisions
Before 1885	Change	After 1885
Kirkcudbrightshire (1 MP)	No change.	Kirkcudbrightshire (1 MP)
=== Lanarkshire === Representation increased from 2 to 6 MPs; See also the parliamentary burgh of Glasgow, the Falkirk District of Burghs which included three Lanarkshire burghs and the Kilmarnock District of Burghs which included the burgh of Rutherglen.
County Divisions
Before 1885	Change	After 1885
Northern Division (1 MP)	Reorganised as six single-member divisions.	Govan Division (1 MP)
Northern Division (1 MP)	Reorganised as six single-member divisions.	Mid Division (1 MP)
Northern Division (1 MP)	Reorganised as six single-member divisions.	North Eastern Division (1 MP)
Southern Division (1 MP)	Reorganised as six single-member divisions.	North Western Division (1 MP)
Southern Division (1 MP)	Reorganised as six single-member divisions.	Partick Division (1 MP)
Southern Division (1 MP)	Reorganised as six single-member divisions.	Southern Division (1 MP)
=== Linlithgowshire === Representation unchanged (1 MP); The parliamentary burgh of Linlithgow formed part of Fakirk District and the burgh of Queensferry formed part of Stirling District.
County Divisions
Before 1885	Change	After 1885
Linlithgowshire (1 MP)	No change	Linlithgowshire (1 MP)
=== Orkney and Shetland === Representation unchanged (1 MP); The parliamentary burgh of Kirkwall formed part of Wick District.
County Divisions
Before 1885	Change	After 1885
Orkney and Shetland (1 MP)	No change	Orkney and Shetland (1 MP)
=== Peeblesshire and Selkirkshire === Representation unchanged (1 MP); The parliamentary burghs of Galashiels and Selkirk formed part of the Hawick District
County Divisions
Before 1885	Change	After 1885
Peeblesshire and Selkirkshire (1 MP)	No change. The constituency consisted of the combined parliamentary counties of Peeblesshire and Selkirkshire.	Peeblesshire and Selkirkshire (1 MP)
=== Perthshire === Representation increased from 1 to 2 MPs; See also the parliamentary burghs of Perth City and Culross (part of Stirling District). Detached parts of the county formed part of the Clackmannanshire and Kinross-shire constituency.
County Divisions
Before 1885	Change	After 1885
Perthshire (1 MP)	Divided into two single-member divisions.	Perthshire, Eastern Division (1 MP)
Perthshire (1 MP)	Divided into two single-member divisions.	Perthshire, Western Division (1 MP)
=== Renfrewshire === Representation increased from 1 to 2 MPs; See also the parliamentary burghs of Greenock and Paisley; and two burghs in the Kilmarnock District: Port Glasgow and Renfrew. Part of the parliamentary burgh of Glasgow was in Renfrewshire.
County Divisions
Before 1885	Change	After 1885
Renfrewshire (1 MP)	Divided into two single-member divisions.	Renfrewshire, Eastern Division (1 MP)
Renfrewshire (1 MP)	Divided into two single-member divisions.	Renfrewshire, Western Division (1 MP)
=== Ross and Cromarty === Representation unchanged (1 MP); Parliamentary burghs of Cromarty, Dingwall and Tain formed part of the Dingwall District; the burgh of Fortrose was part of the Inverness District.
County Divisions
Before 1885	Change	After 1885
Ross and Cromarty (1 MP)	Comprised the combined counties of Ross-shire and Cromarty.	Ross and Cromarty (1 MP)
=== Roxburghshire === Representation unchanged (1 MP); Parliamentary burgh of Hawick formed part of the Hawick District.
County Divisions
Before 1885	Change	After 1885
Roxburghshire (1 MP)	Absorbed the abolished parliamentary burgh of Jedburgh, previously part of the Haddington District of Burghs.	Roxburghshire (1 MP)
=== Stirlingshire === Representation unchanged (1 MP); Parliamentary burgh of Falkirk formed part of the Falkirk District; burgh of Stirling was part of Stirling District. The Stirlingshire portion of the parish of Alva formed of the Clackmannanshire and Kinross-shire constituency.
County Divisions
Before 1885	Change	After 1885
Stirlingshire (1 MP)	No change	Stirlingshire (1 MP)
=== Sutherland === Representation unchanged (1 MP); The parliamentary burgh of Dornoch formed part of the Wick District.
County Divisions
Before 1885	Change	After 1885
Sutherland (1 MP)	No change	Sutherland (1 MP)
=== Wigtownshire === Representation unchanged (1 MP)
County Divisions
Before 1885	Change	After 1885
Wigtownshire (1 MP)	Absorbed abolished parliamentary burghs of Stranraer, Whithorn and Wigtown, previously part of Wigtown District of Burghs.	Wigtownshire (1 MP)
=== Universities ===
Edinburgh and St Andrews Universities (1 MP)	No change.	Edinburgh and St Andrews Universities (1 MP)
Glasgow and Aberdeen Universities (1 MP)	No change	Glasgow and Aberdeen Universities (1 MP)

== Redistributed seats: Ireland ==
=== Antrim === Representation increased from 6 to 8 MPs ‡ The parliamentary boroughs of Belfast and Lisburn were partly in County Down
Boroughs
Before 1885	Change	After 1885
Carrickfergus (1 MP)	Abolished.	
Belfast‡ (2 MPs)	Enlarged to include parts of the parishes of Holywood and Newtownbreda in County Down; and part of the parish of Shankill in County Antrim. Representation increased to four members, divided into four single-member divisions.	East Belfast (1 MP)
Belfast‡ (2 MPs)	Enlarged to include parts of the parishes of Holywood and Newtownbreda in County Down; and part of the parish of Shankill in County Antrim. Representation increased to four members, divided into four single-member divisions.	North Belfast (1 MP)
Belfast‡ (2 MPs)	Enlarged to include parts of the parishes of Holywood and Newtownbreda in County Down; and part of the parish of Shankill in County Antrim. Representation increased to four members, divided into four single-member divisions.	South Belfast (1 MP)
Belfast‡ (2 MPs)	Enlarged to include parts of the parishes of Holywood and Newtownbreda in County Down; and part of the parish of Shankill in County Antrim. Representation increased to four members, divided into four single-member divisions.	West Belfast (1 MP)
Lisburn‡ (1 MP)	Abolished.	
County Divisions
Before 1885	Change	After 1885
County Antrim (2 MPs)	Divided into four single-member divisions, absorbing abolished parliamentary borough of Lisburn.	East Antrim (1 MP)
County Antrim (2 MPs)	Divided into four single-member divisions, absorbing abolished parliamentary borough of Lisburn.	Mid Antrim (1 MP)
County Antrim (2 MPs)	Divided into four single-member divisions, absorbing abolished parliamentary borough of Lisburn.	North Antrim (1 MP)
County Antrim (2 MPs)	Divided into four single-member divisions, absorbing abolished parliamentary borough of Lisburn.	South Antrim (1 MP)
=== Armagh === Representation unchanged (3 MPs)
Boroughs
Before 1885	Change	After 1885
Armagh (1 MP)	Abolished.	
County Divisions
Before 1885	Change	After 1885
County Armagh (2 MPs)	Divided into three single-member divisions, absorbing abolished parliamentary borough of Armagh.	Mid Armagh (1 MP)
County Armagh (2 MPs)	Divided into three single-member divisions, absorbing abolished parliamentary borough of Armagh.	North Armagh (1 MP)
County Armagh (2 MPs)	Divided into three single-member divisions, absorbing abolished parliamentary borough of Armagh.	South Armagh (1 MP)
=== Carlow === Representation decreased from 3 MPs to 1. ‡ Part of the borough of Carlow was in Queen's County
Boroughs
Before 1885	Change	After 1885
Carlow‡ (1 MP)	Abolished.	
County Divisions
Before 1885	Change	After 1885
County Carlow (2 MPs)	Representation reduced to one member, absorbed abolished parliamentary borough of Carlow.	County Carlow (1 MP)
=== Cavan === Representation unchanged (2 MPs)
County Divisions
Before 1885	Change	After 1885
County Cavan (2 MPs)	Divided into two single-member divisions.	East Cavan (1 MP)
County Cavan (2 MPs)	Divided into two single-member divisions.	West Cavan (1 MP)
=== Clare === Representation decreased from 3 to 2 MPs
Boroughs
Before 1885	Change	After 1885
Ennis‡ (1 MP)	Abolished.	
County Divisions
Before 1885	Change	After 1885
County Clare (2 MPs)	Absorbed abolished parliamentary borough of Ennis. Divided into two single-member divisions.	East Clare (1 MP)
County Clare (2 MPs)	Absorbed abolished parliamentary borough of Ennis. Divided into two single-member divisions.	West Clare (1 MP)
=== Cork === Representation increased from 8 to 9 MPs
Boroughs
Before 1885	Change	After 1885
Bandon (1 MP)	Abolished	
Cork (2 MPs)	No change	Cork (2 MPs)
Kinsale (1 MP)	Abolished	
Mallow (1 MP)	Abolished	
Youghal (1 MP)	Abolished	
County Divisions
Before 1885	Change	After 1885
County Cork (2 MPs)	Absorbed abolished parliamentary boroughs of Bandon, Kinsale, Mallow and Youghal. Divided into seven single-member divisions.	East Cork (1 MP)
County Cork (2 MPs)	Absorbed abolished parliamentary boroughs of Bandon, Kinsale, Mallow and Youghal. Divided into seven single-member divisions.	Mid Cork (1 MP)
County Cork (2 MPs)	Absorbed abolished parliamentary boroughs of Bandon, Kinsale, Mallow and Youghal. Divided into seven single-member divisions.	North Cork (1 MP)
County Cork (2 MPs)	Absorbed abolished parliamentary boroughs of Bandon, Kinsale, Mallow and Youghal. Divided into seven single-member divisions.	North East Cork (1 MP)
County Cork (2 MPs)	Absorbed abolished parliamentary boroughs of Bandon, Kinsale, Mallow and Youghal. Divided into seven single-member divisions.	South Cork (1 MP)
County Cork (2 MPs)	Absorbed abolished parliamentary boroughs of Bandon, Kinsale, Mallow and Youghal. Divided into seven single-member divisions.	South East Cork (1 MP)
County Cork (2 MPs)	Absorbed abolished parliamentary boroughs of Bandon, Kinsale, Mallow and Youghal. Divided into seven single-member divisions.	West Cork (1 MP)
=== Donegal === Representation increased from 2 to 4 MPs
County Divisions
Before 1885	Change	After 1885
County Donegal (2 MPs)	Divided into four single-member divisions.	East Donegal (1 MP)
County Donegal (2 MPs)	Divided into four single-member divisions.	North Donegal (1 MP)
County Donegal (2 MPs)	Divided into four single-member divisions.	South Donegal (1 MP)
County Donegal (2 MPs)	Divided into four single-member divisions.	West Donegal (1 MP)
=== Down === Representation increased from 4 to 5 MPs ‡ The Borough of Newry was partly in County Armagh.
Boroughs
Before 1885	Change	After 1885
Downpatrick (1 MP)	Abolished.	
Newry‡ (1 MP)	No change	Newry‡ (1 MP)
County Divisions
Before 1885	Change	After 1885
County Down (2 MPs)	Absorbed parliamentary borough of Downpatrick. Divided into for single-member divisions.	East Down (1 MP)
County Down (2 MPs)	Absorbed parliamentary borough of Downpatrick. Divided into for single-member divisions.	North Down (1 MP)
County Down (2 MPs)	Absorbed parliamentary borough of Downpatrick. Divided into for single-member divisions.	South Down (1 MP)
County Down (2 MPs)	Absorbed parliamentary borough of Downpatrick. Divided into for single-member divisions.	West Down (1 MP)
=== Dublin === Representation increased from 4 to 6 MPs
Boroughs
Before 1885	Change	After 1885
Dublin (2 MPs)	Representation increased to four members. Divided into four single-member divisions.	College Green (1 MP)
Dublin (2 MPs)	Representation increased to four members. Divided into four single-member divisions.	Dublin Harbour (1 MP)
Dublin (2 MPs)	Representation increased to four members. Divided into four single-member divisions.	St Patrick's (1 MP)
Dublin (2 MPs)	Representation increased to four members. Divided into four single-member divisions.	St Stephen's Green (1 MP)
County Divisions
Before 1885	Change	After 1885
County Dublin (2 MPs)	Divided into two single-member divisions.	North Dublin (1 MP)
County Dublin (2 MPs)	Divided into two single-member divisions.	South Dublin (1 MP)
=== Fermanagh === Representation reduced from 3 to 2 MPs
Boroughs
Before 1885	Change	After 1885
Enniskillen (1 MP)	Abolished.	
County Divisions
Before 1885	Change	After 1885
County Fermanagh (2 MPs)	Divided into two single-member divisions.	North Fermanagh (1 MP)
County Fermanagh (2 MPs)	Divided into two single-member divisions.	South Fermanagh (1 MP)
=== Galway === Representation increased from 4 to 5 MPs
Boroughs
Before 1885	Change	After 1885
Galway (2 MPs)	Representation reduced to one MP.	Galway (1 MP)
County Divisions
Before 1885	Change	After 1885
County Galway (2 MPs)	Divided into four single-member divisions.	Connemara (1 MP)
County Galway (2 MPs)	Divided into four single-member divisions.	East Galway (1 MP)
County Galway (2 MPs)	Divided into four single-member divisions.	North Galway (1 MP)
County Galway (2 MPs)	Divided into four single-member divisions.	South Galway (1 MP)
=== Kerry === Representation increased from 3 to 4 MPs
Boroughs
Before 1885	Change	After 1885
Tralee (1 MP)	Abolished.	
County Divisions
Before 1885	Change	After 1885
County Kerry (2 MPs)	Absorbed abolished parliamentary borough of Tralee. Divided into four single-member divisions.	East Kerry (1 MP)
County Kerry (2 MPs)	Absorbed abolished parliamentary borough of Tralee. Divided into four single-member divisions.	North Kerry (1 MP)
County Kerry (2 MPs)	Absorbed abolished parliamentary borough of Tralee. Divided into four single-member divisions.	South Kerry (1 MP)
County Kerry (2 MPs)	Absorbed abolished parliamentary borough of Tralee. Divided into four single-member divisions.	West Kerry (1 MP)
=== Kildare === Representation unchanged (2 MPs)
County Divisions
Before 1885	Change	After 1885
County Kildare (2 MPs)	Divided into two single-member divisions.	North Kildare (1 MP)
County Kildare (2 MPs)	Divided into two single-member divisions.	South Kildare (1 MP)
=== Kilkenny === Representation unchanged (3 MPs)
Boroughs
Before 1885	Change	After 1885
Kilkenny City (1 MP)	No change	Kilkenny City (1 MP)
County Divisions
Before 1885	Change	After 1885
County Kilkenny (2 MPs)	Divided into two single-member divisions.	North Kilkenny (1 MP)
County Kilkenny (2 MPs)	Divided into two single-member divisions.	South Kilkenny (1 MP)
=== King's County === Representation unchanged (2 MPs)
County Divisions
Before 1885	Change	After 1885
King's County (2 MPs)	Divided into two single-member divisions.	Tullamore (1 MP)
King's County (2 MPs)	Divided into two single-member divisions.	Birr (1 MP)
=== Leitrim === Representation unchanged (2 MPs)
County Divisions
Before 1885	Change	After 1885
County Leitrim (2 MPs)	Divided into two single-member divisions.	North Leitrim (1 MP)
County Leitrim (2 MPs)	Divided into two single-member divisions.	South Leitrim (1 MP)
=== Limerick === Representation reduced from 4 to 3 MPs
Boroughs
Before 1885	Change	After 1885
Limerick City (2 MPs)	Representation reduce to one MP.	Limerick City (1 MP)
County Divisions
Before 1885	Change	After 1885
County Limerick (2 MPs)	Divided into two single-member divisions.	East Limerick (1 MP)
County Limerick (2 MPs)	Divided into two single-member divisions.	West Limerick (1 MP)
=== Londonderry === Representation reduced from 4 to 3 MPs
Boroughs
Before 1885	Change	After 1885
Coleraine (1 MP)	Abolished.	
Londonderry City (1 MP)	No change	Londonderry City (1 MP)
County Divisions
Before 1885	Change	After 1885
County Londonderry (2 MPs)	Absorbed abolished parliamentary borough of Coleraine. Divided into two single-member divisions.	North Derry (1 MP)
County Londonderry (2 MPs)	Absorbed abolished parliamentary borough of Coleraine. Divided into two single-member divisions.	South Derry (1 MP)
=== Longford === Representation unchanged (2 MPs)
County Divisions
Before 1885	Change	After 1885
County Longford (2 MPs)	Divided into two single-member divisions.	North Longford (1 MP)
County Longford (2 MPs)	Divided into two single-member divisions.	South Longford (1 MP)
=== Louth === Representation reduced from 4 to 2 MPs ‡ The parliamentary borough of Drogheda lay partly in County Meath.
Boroughs
Before 1885	Change	After 1885
Drogheda‡ (1 MP)	Abolished.	
Dundalk (1 MP)	Abolished.	
County Divisions
Before 1885	Change	After 1885
County Louth (2 MPs)	Absorbed abolished parliamentary boroughs of Drogheda and Dundalk. Divided into two single-member divisions.	North Louth (1 MP)
County Louth (2 MPs)	Absorbed abolished parliamentary boroughs of Drogheda and Dundalk. Divided into two single-member divisions.	South Louth (1 MP)
=== Mayo === Representation increased from 2 to 4 MPs
County Divisions
Before 1885	Change	After 1885
County Mayo (2 MPs)	Divided into four single-member divisions.	East Mayo (1 MP)
County Mayo (2 MPs)	Divided into four single-member divisions.	North Mayo (1 MP)
County Mayo (2 MPs)	Divided into four single-member divisions.	South Mayo (1 MP)
County Mayo (2 MPs)	Divided into four single-member divisions.	West Mayo (1 MP)
=== Meath === Representation unchanged (2 MPs)
County Divisions
Before 1885	Change	After 1885
County Meath (2 MPs)	Divided into two single-member divisions.	North Meath (1 MP)
County Meath (2 MPs)	Divided into two single-member divisions.	South Meath (1 MP)
=== Monaghan === Representation unchanged (2 MPs)
County Divisions
Before 1885	Change	After 1885
County Monaghan (2 MPs)	Divided into two single-member divisions.	North Monaghan (1 MP)
County Monaghan (2 MPs)	Divided into two single-member divisions.	South Monaghan (1 MP)
=== Queen's County === Representation reduced from 3 MPs to 2. ‡ The parliamentary borough of Portarlington was partly in King's County
Boroughs
Before 1885	Change	After 1885
Portarlington (1 MP)	Abolished.	
County Divisions
Before 1885	Change	After 1885
Queen's County (2 MPs)	Absorbed abolished parliamentary borough of Portarlington. Divided into two single-member divisions.	Leix (1 MP)
Queen's County (2 MPs)	Absorbed abolished parliamentary borough of Portarlington. Divided into two single-member divisions.	Ossory (1 MP)
=== Roscommon === Representation unchanged (2 MPs)
County Divisions
Before 1885	Change	After 1885
County Roscommon (2 MPs)	Divided into two single-member divisions.	North Roscommon (1 MP)
County Roscommon (2 MPs)	Divided into two single-member divisions.	South Roscommon (1 MP)
=== Sligo === Representation unchanged (2 MPs)
County Divisions
Before 1885	Change	After 1885
County Sligo (2 MPs)	Divided into two single-member divisions.	North Sligo (1 MP)
County Sligo (2 MPs)	Divided into two single-member divisions.	South Sligo (1 MP)
=== Tipperary === Representation increased from 3 MPs to 4. ‡ The parliamentary borough of Clonmel was partly in County Waterford
Boroughs
Before 1885	Change	After 1885
Clonmel ‡ (1 MP)	Abolished.	
County Divisions
Before 1885	Change	After 1885
County Tipperary (2 MPs)	Divided into four single-member divisions.	East Tipperary (1 MP)
County Tipperary (2 MPs)	Divided into four single-member divisions.	Mid Tipperary (1 MP)
County Tipperary (2 MPs)	Divided into four single-member divisions.	North Tipperary (1 MP)
County Tipperary (2 MPs)	Divided into four single-member divisions.	South Tipperary (1 MP)
=== Tyrone === Representation increased from 3 MPs to 4.
Boroughs
Before 1885	Change	After 1885
Dungannon (1 MP)	Abolished.	
County Divisions
Before 1885	Change	After 1885
County Tyrone (2 MPs)	Absorbed abolished parliamentary borough of Dungannon. Divided into four single-member divisions.	East Tyrone (1 MP)
County Tyrone (2 MPs)	Absorbed abolished parliamentary borough of Dungannon. Divided into four single-member divisions.	Mid Tyrone (1 MP)
County Tyrone (2 MPs)	Absorbed abolished parliamentary borough of Dungannon. Divided into four single-member divisions.	North Tyrone (1 MP)
County Tyrone (2 MPs)	Absorbed abolished parliamentary borough of Dungannon. Divided into four single-member divisions.	South Tyrone (1 MP)
=== Waterford === Representation reduced from 5 to 3 MPs
Boroughs
Before 1885	Change	After 1885
Dungarvan (1 MP)	Abolished.	
Waterford City (2 MPs)	Representation reduced to one member.	Waterford City (1 MP)
County Divisions
Before 1885	Change	After 1885
County Waterford (2 MPs)	Absorbed abolished parliamentary borough of Dungarvan. Divided into two single-member divisions.	East Waterford (1 MP)
County Waterford (2 MPs)	Absorbed abolished parliamentary borough of Dungarvan. Divided into two single-member divisions.	West Waterford (1 MP)
=== Westmeath === Representation reduced from 3 to 2 MPs ‡ The parliamentary borough of Athlone was partly in County Roscommon.
Boroughs
Before 1885	Change	After 1885
Athlone‡ (1 MP)	Abolished.	
County Divisions
Before 1885	Change	After 1885
County Westmeath (2 MPs)	Absorbed abolished parliamentary borough of Athlone. Divided into two single-member divisions.	North Westmeath (1 MP)
County Westmeath (2 MPs)	Absorbed abolished parliamentary borough of Athlone. Divided into two single-member divisions.	South Westmeath (1 MP)
=== Wexford === Representation reduced from 4 to 2 MPs ‡ The parliamentary borough of New Ross was partly in County Kilkenny.
Boroughs
Before 1885	Change	After 1885
New Ross‡ (1 MP)	Abolished.	
Wexford (1 MP)	Abolished.	
County Divisions
Before 1885	Change	After 1885
County Wexford (2 MPs)	Absorbed abolished parliamentary boroughs of New Ross and Wexford. Divided into two single-member divisions.	North Wexford (1 MP)
County Wexford (2 MPs)	Absorbed abolished parliamentary boroughs of New Ross and Wexford. Divided into two single-member divisions.	South Wexford (1 MP)
=== Wicklow === Representation unchanged (2 MPs)
County Divisions
Before 1885	Change	After 1885
County Wicklow (2 MPs)	Divided into two single-member divisions.	East Wicklow (1 MP)
County Wicklow (2 MPs)	Divided into two single-member divisions.	West Wicklow (1 MP)
=== University of Dublin === Representation unchanged (2 MPs)
Dublin University (2 MPs)	No change.	Dublin University (2 MPs)

== Subsequent developments ==
As respects England and Scotland, the whole act as far as unrepealed, and as respects Ireland, subsections (3) and (4) of section eight, sections ten to twelve, subsections (3), (4), and (5) of section thirteen, sections fourteen, fifteen, eighteen, and twenty, and in section twenty-six the words from " with the following " to the end of the section, was repealed by section 47 of, and the eighth schedule to, the Representation of the People Act 1918 (7 & 8 Geo. 5. c. 64).

The whole act was repealed for England and Wales and Scotland by section 80(7) of, and the thirteenth schedule to, the Representation of the People Act 1948 (11 & 12 Geo. 6. c. 65), which came into force on 30 July 1948.

== See also ==
- Apportionment Act of 1911
- Reform Acts
- Representation of the People Act
- Parliamentary franchise in the United Kingdom 1885–1918
- Uniform Congressional District Act

== Bibliography ==
- Youngs, Frederic A Jr. (1979). Guide to the Local Administrative Units of England, Vol.I: Southern England. London: Royal Historical Society. ISBN 0-901050-67-9.
- Youngs, Frederic A Jr. (1991). Guide to the Local Administrative Units of England, Vol.2: Northern England. London: Royal Historical Society. ISBN 0-86193-127-0.
