= Charles Turner (MP) =

British businessman and politician

Charles Turner (13 June 1803 – 15 October 1875) was a British businessman and Conservative politician.

He was the son of Ralph Turner, a trader from Hull, Yorkshire. He entered business in Liverpool as an East India Company merchant. He subsequently became chairman of the British Shipowners Company and of the Royal Insurance Company, and a director of the Great Northern Railway. From 1851 – 1861 he was chairman of the Mersey Docks and Harbour Board. He was appointed as a justice of the peace for the County Palatine of Lancaster and Borough of Liverpool, and was a deputy lieutenant for the county.

Politically, Turner was a Conservative, and in July 1852 was elected one of Liverpool's two members of parliament, along with William Forbes Mackenzie. However, the two defeated Liberal candidates issued an election petition contesting the results. In the ensuing court proceedings the two men's election agents were found to have been guilty of bribery and treating. On 21 June 1853 the election of Turner and Mackenzie was declared void. Turner was again chosen as a Conservative candidate for Liverpool at the next general election in 1857, but was unsuccessful.

Turner was to return to the Commons in 1861. In that year the representation of the existing constituency of South Lancashire was increased from two to three members of parliament. Turner was nominated to contest the seat for the Conservatives. In his nomination speech, he set out his opposition to the separation of church and state and to elections by secret ballot. The by-election was held on 17 August and Turner defeated his Liberal opponent by a majority of 834 votes. He held the seat at the next general election in 1865.

The Reform Act 1867 abolished the South Lancashire constituency. When the next general election was held in 1868, Turner was elected as one of two members for the new seat of South West Lancashire, holding it in 1874. He remained an MP until his death.

In 1843 Turner married Anne Whitaker of Melton, Yorkshire, and they had one son. In 1875, he became unwell, and it was widely expected that he would retire from parliament. Before he could do so he died at his residence in Dingle, Liverpool aged 72.

Parliament of the United Kingdom
Preceded by Edward Cardwell; Sir Thomas Birch, Bt	Member of Parliament for Liverpool; 1852 – 1853; With: William Forbes Mackenzie	Succeeded by Thomas Horsfall; Henry Liddell
Preceded by Algernon Egerton; William Legh	Member of Parliament for South Lancashire; 1861 –1868; With: Algernon Egerton 1861 – 1868; William Legh 1861 – 1865; William Ewart Gladstone 1865 – 1868	Constituency abolished
New constituency	Member of Parliament for Lancashire South West; 1868–1875; With: R. A. Cross	Succeeded by John Ireland Blackburne
