= Chris Rennard, Baron Rennard =

British politician

The Right Honourable The Lord Rennard MBE
- Official portrait, 2026

Chief Executive of the Liberal Democrats
- In office 2003–2009
- Preceded by: Hugh Rickard
- Succeeded by: Chris Fox

Member of the House of Lords
- Lord Temporal
- Life peerage 21 July 1999

Personal details
- Born: Christopher John Rennard; 8 July 1960 (age 66) Liverpool, England
- Party: Liberal Democrats
- Other political affiliations: Independent (Jan–Dec 2014, Feb-May 2026)
- Education: University of Liverpool
- Website: chrisrennard.uk

Christopher John Rennard, Baron Rennard, MBE (born 8 July 1960) is a British life peer in the House of Lords, appointed to the Liberal Democrats' benches in 1999. He was Director of Campaigns & Elections for the Liberal Democrats from 1989 to 2003, and Chief Executive of the party from 2003 to 2009.

== Education and early career ==
Rennard was born in 1960, the second of three sons to Cecil Rennard (1888–1963) and Jean Winifred Watson (1923–1977). He has an older step sister from his father's first marriage; his father also had two step children through that marriage.

Rennard was educated at the Liverpool Blue Coat School and gained a BA (Hons) in Social Studies in 1982 from the University of Liverpool. From his early teens he was an active member of the Liberal Party. He began his political activism in Liverpool in the late 1970s, where he chaired the Liverpool University Liberals. He cites the early pioneers of community politics in Liverpool, including Cyril Carr, Trevor Jones and David Alton, as having had a major influence on him. Rennard was Deputy Chair of the Liverpool Liberal Party and organised many of the party's election campaigns in the 1980s, at a time when the Liberal Party controlled the City Council. The first successful parliamentary by-election campaign he worked on was the Liverpool Edge Hill by-election in March 1979, at which the party's candidate was David Alton. Rennard was Alton's agent when he successfully contested the newly created Liverpool Mossley Hill constituency in 1983 (after boundary changes) and helped to secure a win there in a general election that saw a landslide Conservative victory nationally.

In 1984 he became one of the party's national Area Agents, based in Leicester, when the party won its first seats there for over 20 years. He was a member of many of the Liberal/Alliance by-election campaign teams, including those in West Derbyshire in 1986 and Greenwich in 1987. He was a member of the standing committee of ALC (Association of Liberal Councillors) and wrote some party publications on election campaigning and party organisation.

== National positions ==
In 1989 Rennard was appointed as Director of Campaigns and Elections for the Liberal Democrats. He married Ann McTegart (whom he had met when they were both Liberal Party agents in Merseyside in the 1980s) and was appointed a Member of the Order of the British Empire (MBE) in the 1989 New Year Honours.

In the 1997 general election he oversaw the party's target-seat campaign, which resulted in the Liberal Democrats nearly doubling its number of MPs from 26 to 46. In 2001 and 2005, with Tim Razzall (Baron Razzall) as Campaign Chair and Charles Kennedy as Leader, he also directed the Liberal Democrats' general-election campaigns, which further increased the number of Lib Dem MPs respectively to 52 and 62, the largest total of Liberal or Liberal Democrat MPs since 1923.

He was the party's Chief Executive between 2003 and 2009. During his employment by the Liberal Democrats at a national level, he was credited with winning 13 parliamentary by-elections for the party (11 gains and 2 holds), out of a total of 74 by-elections held—a success rate of 17.5%. The Eastbourne by-election in 1990 was claimed by Rennard as rescuing the Liberal Democrats from their very weak position following the merger of the Liberal Party and the SDP, and saw a 16,923 Conservative majority become a Liberal Democrat majority of 4,550. The by-election followed a major row between Rennard and Paddy Ashdown over the party leader's initial opposition to the Liberal Democrats fighting the by-election. A by-election in Christchurch during July 1993 saw the Liberal Democrats gain the seat from the Conservatives by the largest swing (35%) against any British government since 1918.

Former party leader Charles Kennedy has described Rennard as "a quite extraordinary figure in British politics", while his predecessor Paddy Ashdown praised Rennard as "a formidable and widely-respected practitioner of political campaigning across all parties". Iain Dale said in an interview in Total Politics (June 2011) that Rennard "is probably the most formidable and feared political campaigner of the last 20 years."

Concerning the 2001 general election, Andrew Stunell, a friend of Rennard's, is reported as having said: "Last time people didn't follow Chris [Rennard's] instructions and the difference between those who did and who didn't – like in the Isle of Wight [which the party lost] – was very clear. The message got through."

Rennard has claimed credit for pioneering the successful Liberal Democrat election strategy of claiming narrow majorities when in second or even third place and ruthlessly squeezing third-party votes in Tory–Lib Dem and Labour–Lib Dem marginals; although this technique had been in use by the Liberal Party's campaigns teams since at least October 1974, when Rennard was 14 years old.

== Later posts ==
Rennard served as the Liberal Democrats Chief Executive from 2003 to 2009, during which time he was in overall charge of the party's election campaigns and organisation. His campaigns team continued to build the party's successes through by-elections such as Brent East in 2003 and Leicester South in 2004. Following the Lib Dems' victory at Brent East in 2003, The Independent profiled Lord Rennard, saying calling him "a Liberal democrat who knows how to win elections" and saying that "In recent years thoughtful Conservatives surveying their wretched political predicament sometimes wondered aloud where "their" Peter Mandelson was. As usual they were asking the wrong question. They should have been seeking "their" Chris Rennard. For while Rennard enjoys a rather lower profile than New Labour's sultan of spin, the Liberal Democrats' own election guru is a no less formidable operator. True, Rennard has not managed to take the Liberal Democrats to Downing Street with a landslide majority, but it is in large part to him that the party owes its revival, the latest evidence of which was its victory in Brent East." As Chief Executive, Rennard oversaw the party’s recovery from a series of crises in January 2006 when Charles Kennedy resigned as Leader, Mark Oaten resigned as the party’s Home Affairs spokesman and Simon Hughes was claimed to be gay by The Sun newspaper. This turbulent period came to an end in March when he oversaw victory in the 2006 Dunfermline and West Fife by-election, which brought the total of Liberal Democrats MPs to 63. He chaired the Liberal Democrat general election campaign for both Sir Menzies Campbell and Nick Clegg between summer 2006 and May 2009, when he stood down as Chief Executive of the Party.

Rennard announced that he would be standing down as chief executive of the Liberal Democrats in May 2009. He indicated that he had discussed standing down some time earlier with the party leader, Nick Clegg, and that this was for family and health reasons, saying that he had "struggled to maintain good diabetic control with the rigours of a very demanding lifestyle". Clegg subsequently conceded that sexual harassment allegations against Rennard from multiple women also contributed to Rennard's resignation, stating that "He left on health grounds but of course the issues of his inappropriate behaviour were in the background."

After relinquishing the full-time position, Rennard continued to contribute to some party election campaigns on a constituency-by-constituency basis. However, Lib Dem President and future Party Leader Tim Farron insisted that "Under no circumstances" would Rennard have a future campaigning role. Rennard was appointed to chair a Commission on the Big Society set up by the Association of Chief Executives of Voluntary Organisations (ACEVO) to articulate a civil society vision of what charities wanted to achieve through the Big Society agenda. He was formerly a trustee of the charity Action on Smoking and Health (ASH).

He is a Patron of The Crescent, a centre in St Albans which provides help and support to those living with, or otherwise affected by, HIV.

Lord Rennard provides advice and support on campaign, communication, fundraising and management issues through the consultancy Rennard & McTegart Ltd. He is the Director of Communications for the British Healthcare Trades Association (BHTA) and writes a regular "Westminster Watch" column for their Bulletin.

== House of Lords ==
Rennard was created a life peer on 21 July 1999 as Baron Rennard, of Wavertree in the County of Merseyside, and was introduced in the House of Lords on 27 July 1999. He is the treasurer of the All-Party Parliamentary Group on Diabetes and a vice chair of the All-Party Parliamentary Group on Smoking and Health.

In the House of Lords, Rennard has mostly spoken on political and constitutional reform issues. He led for the Liberal Democrats in debate on what became the Political Parties, Elections and Referendums Act 2000, that set the framework for rules such as those governing party finance. He spoke in favour of replacing large donor funding of parties, with limited state funding. He has campaigned against abuses of the postal vote system and helped to bring about some reforms to it. He has spoken out strongly for and voted for reform of the House of Lords at every possible stage. In the 2010–2015 Parliament he was responsible for changing proposals to move electoral registration to an entirely voluntary system that some say would have greatly favoured the Conservatives. He was also responsible in the House of Lords for the cross-party amendment that blocked the proposed review of parliamentary boundaries, thought by some to favour the Conservatives by up to 30 seats at the next general election. He also speaks in the Lords on other issues, including some associated with public health including diabetes and smoking.

=== Expenses ===
In May 2009 Rennard was criticised for claiming a House of Lords member's allowance of £41,678, having designated a flat in Eastbourne as his main residence and his central London house as his second home. A subsequent complaint made by the Sunlight Centre for Open Politics was investigated by the Clerk of the Parliaments Michael Pownall, who did not uphold it, "In view of the assurances by Lord Rennard about the change in his circumstances and the time he spends in Eastbourne, and in the absence of any definition of main address in the current guidance to the House of Lords’ Members Expenses Scheme".

== Allegations of sexual harassment ==
In February 2013, Channel 4 News ran a report on Lord Rennard, alleging a history of sexual harassment during his time as an official of the party. Channel 4 stated that the alleged victims decided to comment publicly since Rennard had begun to again play an 'active role in the Party'. He strongly denied the allegations.

The earliest claims go back to 2007 when two women met Paul Burstow, then the party's Chief Whip in the Commons, to raise the issue with him. In a February 2013 statement issued shortly after Channel 4 News had broken the story, Nick Clegg wrote that claims about the improper conduct of Lord Rennard had been brought to his attention in 2008, but Rennard had denied any wrongdoing when challenged. The "indirect and non-specific concerns" he had been told about meant that he could take no further action, but Danny Alexander, Clegg's chief of staff at the time, had warned Rennard that the alleged behaviour would be "wholly unacceptable". A subsequent independent report in June 2013 by Helena Morrissey into "processes and culture within the Liberal Democrats" said that the leadership should have held an inquiry into the allegations at that time (when Rennard was still a member of staff).

There was no such inquiry until that conducted by Alistair Webster QC, who concluded after examining over a hundred statements (including those made by the complainants as a result of interviews with specially trained police officers) that the evidence was insufficient to proceed to a disciplinary hearing. While staffing disciplinary matters would have required a civil standard of proof to be met, at that time Liberal Democrat regulations demanded a criminal standard of proof to uphold allegations against a Party member.

The Metropolitan Police carried out their own investigation after one of the complainants went to them on 27 February 2013. On 26 September 2013 the Metropolitan Police announced they had dropped the investigation, because they had found "insufficient evidence". They did not submit a file to the Crown Prosecution Service for consideration.

Following the police "No Further Action" decision, the Liberal Democrats resumed their own inquiry with Alistair Webster QC acting as "independent investigator." According to a later public statement by Lord Rennard, there were three complaints by the deadline of 22 November 2013, and Alistair Webster reported that there was insufficient evidence to proceed further. A fourth complaint was then also considered and Alistair Webster again reported (on 22 December 2013) that there was insufficient evidence to proceed any further. The party rules required the independent QC to either recommend a disciplinary hearing to investigate further, or to say that there was insufficient evidence to proceed.

Alistair Webster informed Lord Rennard on 15 January 2014 that the decision was "No Further Action", and that the party statement that day was "not his responsibility." Webster's public statement on his conclusions from his report stated that there was "broadly credible" evidence of "behaviour which violated the personal space and autonomy of the complainants." The question of the standard of proof required did not arise as the evidence was insufficient to hold a disciplinary hearing - except that Webster did consider this question, noting in his statement that "my task was to review the evidence which I received and consider whether there was a greater than 50% chance that such a charge could be proved to the standard required by the rules, i.e. proof beyond reasonable doubt [a criminal, rather than civil standard of proof] ... My view, judging the evidence as a whole, is that there is a less than 50% chance that a charge against Lord Rennard could be proved to the requisite standard". Webster concluded that it was "unlikely that it could be established beyond reasonable doubt that Lord Rennard had intended to act in an indecent or sexually inappropriate way" and that "I have specifically discounted suggestions made during the investigation that the incidents had been invented as part of a political campaign against Lord Rennard. In my view Lord Rennard ought to reflect upon the effect that his behaviour has had and the distress which it caused and that an apology would be appropriate, as would a commitment to change his behaviour in future".

Neither Nick Clegg nor Tim Farron had read the Webster report (Webster stated 'I do not consider it appropriate to publish the evidence') and Lord Rennard was initially also denied sight of it, in spite of earlier promises that he would see it. Farron asked Lord Rennard to apologise to the women involved. It was reported in The Daily Telegraph that Clegg had stated that "it is right that Chris Rennard has been asked in this report to apologise, to reflect on his behaviour." Clegg went on to state that Rennard would not be "playing any role in my general election plans for the campaign in 2015."

The report was eventually provided to Lord Rennard and to the four complainants in March 2014 and it did not contain any request or recommendation for an apology - though Webster made this request in his Jan 2014 public statement on conclusions from his investigation. A statement from Lord Rennard in August 2014 said that a Liberal Democrat English Appeals Committee ruling in July 2014 found that "I could not be criticised over my reaction to the previous report by Alistair Webster QC, as I was not given sight of the report for 11 weeks".

On 20 January 2014, Rennard was suspended from the Liberal Democrats; he was informed that this was on the basis of "Media and social media comments made by you, endorsed by you and made on your behalf that have attacked the party and the party processes publicly since the announcement of the Webster report results." Lord Rennard's friend and legal adviser, Lord Carlile, wrote a strongly critical article in The Mail on Sunday about "the party's unjust and arbitrary conduct of the case". The week following the suspension, The Times reported from 'allies' of Rennard that the peer knew "where the bodies are buried" and that were he expelled from the Liberal Democrats he would reveal two decades of sex scandal in the Party: "We have had a Cuban missile crisis over the past week."

Lord Rennard issued a lengthy personal statement in response to his suspension explaining some of the background to the allegations made against him and the party's handling of them.

The seven-month suspension of his party membership was lifted in August 2014, when there was a "No Further Action" decision in relation to his criticisms of party processes and he was restored to full membership of the party. A later statement was issued by Rennard on 21 August 2014 saying that:

All allegations made about Lord Rennard have now been investigated thoroughly. This included a seven month investigation by specially trained officers of the Metropolitan Police. The police decided that there could be no charges and did not even a send a file to the Crown Prosecution Service. In addition, there was a lengthy investigation by independent QC Alistair Webster. He also concluded that there was insufficient evidence even to proceed to a disciplinary hearing. The Liberal Democrat Party has now dealt with all the allegations and the matter is closed. We must advise anyone against publishing or broadcasting defamatory remarks. Accusations that were rejected by both the Metropolitan Police and an independent QC would be treated as such.

Helena Morrissey was invited to report on processes and culture within the Liberal Democrats, and her report in December 2014 concluded, in relation to Lord Rennard, that:

At this point, December 2014, every investigation has concluded with no further action to be taken against Lord Rennard. The process over the past nearly two years – conducted according to the prevailing rules – has run its course and although the outcome is a source of great frustration to some, I believe that the Party can only move on if that outcome is accepted. At this stage, given that the Party applied its own processes, there is no justification for it remaining ambivalent towards Lord Rennard – he should be just as welcome a participant or guest at Party events as any other.

She also observed how the Party's burden of proof for disciplinary procedures had been lowered from a criminal ('beyond reasonable doubt') to a civil standard of proof ('on the balance of probabilities').

During his campaign to become Liberal Democrat leader, Tim Farron said that if elected he would have "no intention of appointing him [Rennard] to any role in the party."

In November 2017, the Party's Deputy Leader (and future Leader), Jo Swinson, expressed her desire in a comment piece that Lord Rennard would not be a Liberal Democrat member, writing "That Lord Rennard remains in the party, showing no remorse or contrition, while many of the women involved have left, fills me with sadness and anger ... I do not want Lord Rennard to continue as a member of the party. As far as I am concerned, he is not welcome."

In February 2026 Lord Rennard was once again suspended by the party pending a new investigation into him.

== Attempt to join Liberal Democrat Federal Executive ==
In November 2015 Rennard was chosen to serve as the Liberal Democrat Lords' representative to the Liberal Democrats' governing Federal Executive Committee. A Special Conference triggered by Party members opposed to the decision was averted when Rennard agreed to resign his Committee membership following a public intervention by Tim Farron, who stated "Chris serving on the FE is not in our best interest, as the levels of anger and division have shown. I am therefore asking Chris to step down from the FE in the best interests of the party".

== Memoirs ==
The first volume of his memoirs, Winning Here, went on sale on 25 January 2018. The launch was mired in controversy, when it turned out Lord Rennard was being investigated by the information commissioner for a breach of data protection law by sending unsolicited emails promoting the book to Lib Dem supporters. Private Eye reported that the email offered a 25% discount "when you click through to the shopping page". Readers who accepted would then be treated to how "I started running council elections in my teens, was a successful constituent agent at 22, the Lib Dem director of campaigns and elections at 29, a peer at 39". Private Eye titled the article "Comeuppance Corner", as Lord Rennard was one of those that voted for a change in the data protection law to make newspapers pay both sides' costs in data protection cases.

Orders of precedence in the United Kingdom
Preceded by The Lord Lea of Crondall	Gentlemen; Baron Rennard	Followed by The Lord Bradshaw
