= Liverpool Edge Hill by-election =

Liverpool Edge Hill by-election may refer to one of two parliamentary by-elections held in the British House of Commons constituency of Liverpool Edge Hill:

- 1947 Liverpool Edge Hill by-election
- 1979 Liverpool Edge Hill by-election

== See also ==
- Liverpool Edge Hill (UK Parliament constituency)
