= 1903 Liverpool West Derby by-election =

UK Parliamentary by-election

1903 Liverpool West Derby
- 20 January 1903

Candidate	Rutherford	Holt
Party	Conservative	Liberal
Popular vote	5,455	3,251
Percentage	62.7%	37.3%
MP before election
Samuel Higginbottom
Conservative
Subsequent MP
Watson Rutherford
Conservative

The 1903 Liverpool West Derby by-election was held on 20 January 1903 after the death of the incumbent Conservative MP Samuel Wasse Higginbottom. It was retained by the Conservative candidate Watson Rutherford.

== Vacancy ==
The by-election in West Derby was caused by the death in December 1902 of Conservative MP, Samuel Wasse Higginbottom. He had won the seat unopposed in the previous election in 1900.

== Candidates ==
Several names were mentioned as possible candidates for the Conservative Party, among them the ship-owner Sir Alfred Lewis Jones, the former Lord Mayor of Liverpool Alderman Charles Petrie, and the incumbent Lord Mayor Watson Rutherford. Rutherford was a native of Liverpool, head of an important legal firm in the city, had been a member of the City Council since 1895, and Lord Mayor of Liverpool since November 1902. He was unanimously elected as the candidate by the local conservative council on 5 January, and accepted the nomination the following day, when he also resigned as Lord Mayor.

The Liberal Party approached several people as potential candidates, including Hon. Richard Frederick Molyneux who declined. It was also reported that Rev. Dr. Aked of the Pembroke Baptist Chapel, an outspoken opponent of the recently ended Second Boer War was approached as an independent liberal candidate. They eventually chose as candidate the president of their local West Derby Division, Richard Durning Holt, at a meeting on 8 January. He was a Liverpool shipowner and member of the Mersey Docks and Harbour Board.

The joint committee of the Labour Representative Committee and Liverpool Trades Council decided in a meeting on 11 January to not contest the election.

== Issues ==
In an election address the day after accepting the nomination, Holt mentioned the issues most important to him. He referred to the recently passed Education Act, and promised to "use his best effort to abolish all tests for teachers, and to secure complete and exclusive public control of all elementary schools to be henceforth entirely maintained at the public expense." He declared himself a staunch supporter of free trade, and wanted growth in national expenditure to be checked. On the question of Irish Home Rule, he wanted to ′give the people of Ireland the management of purely Irish affairs, subject to the absolute supremacy of the Imperial Parliament.′ He advocated temperance legislation, and as to trade unions, urged that the law should completely establish the right of all workers to combine for the purpose of collective bargaining as to conditions of pay and work.

Rutherford commented the following day, defending the government's spending by referring to military and naval expenditure arising from the recently ended Second Boer War. He gave strong support for the Education Act, and on the question of Irish Home Rule attacked the Liberal party position as promises they could not deliver. Listing social issues he found important, he wanted Parliament to discuss subjects like housing, disablement and old age pensions.

== Result ==
Rutherford held the seat for the conservative government, and was elected a Member of Parliament (MP).

Liverpool West Derby by-election, 1903
Party	Candidate	Votes	%	±%
Conservative	William Rutherford	5,455	62.7	N/A
Liberal	Richard Durning Holt	3,251	37.3	New
Majority		2,204	25.4	N/A
Turnout		8,706	73.6	N/A
Registered electors		11,824		
Conservative hold		Swing	N/A	

== Aftermath ==
After he was elected to parliament on 20 January 1903, Rutherford was also re-elected as mayor of Liverpool on 4 February 1903 and served the remainder of the term until November 1903. He was the Member of Parliament for Liverpool West Derby from the 1903 until 1918, and for Liverpool Edge Hill from 1918 to 1923.

Holt again tried to take the seat in the 1906 election, but lost. He was subsequently elected at a by-election in 1907 as a Liberal Member of Parliament (MP) for Hexham, serving there until 1918.
