= 1997 Dissolution Honours =

British government recognitions

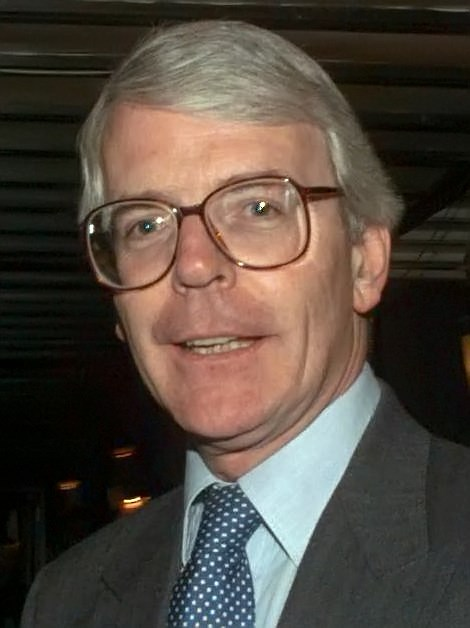
Outgoing Prime Minister John Major in 1996

The 1997 Dissolution Honours List was gazetted on 18 April 1997 following the advice of the outgoing Prime Minister, John Major. The only honours in this list were 21 life peerages.

The recipients are shown below as they were styled before their new honour.

== Life Peers ==
=== Conservative ===
- Rt Hon. Kenneth Wilfred Baker CH, Member of Parliament for Mole Valley, 1983–97; (Acton, 1968–70; St Marylebone, 1970–83); Secretary of State for the Environment, 1985–86; for Education and Science, 1986–89; Chancellor of the Duchy of Lancaster, 1989–90; Chairman of the Conservative Party, 1989–90; Secretary of State for the Home Department, 1990–92.
- Rt Hon. William John Biffen DL, Member of Parliament for Shropshire North, 1983–97; (Oswestry Division of Salop, 1961–83); Chief Secretary to the Treasury, 1979–81; Secretary of State for Trade, 1981–82; Lord President of the Council, 1982–83; Leader of the House of Commons, 1982–87 and Lord Privy Seal, 1983–87.
- Rt Hon. Henry Paul Guinness Channon, Member of Parliament for Southend West, 1959–97; Secretary of State for Trade and Industry, 1986–87; for Transport, 1987–89.
- Rt Hon. David Arthur Russell Howell, Member of Parliament for Guildford, 1966–97; Secretary of State for Energy, 1979–81; for Transport, 1981–83; Chairman, Select Committee on Foreign Affairs, 1987–97.
- Rt Hon. Douglas Richard Hurd CH CBE, Member of Parliament for Witney, 1983–97; (Mid-Oxon, 1974–83); Secretary of State for Northern Ireland, 1984–85; for the Home Department, 1985–89; Secretary of State for Foreign and Commonwealth Affairs, 1989–95.
- Rt Hon. Thomas Michael Jopling DL, Member of Parliament for Westmorland and Lonsdale, 1983–97; (Westmorland, 1964–83); Parliamentary Secretary to H.M. Treasury and Chief Whip, 1979–83; Minister of Agriculture, Fisheries and Food, 1983–87.
- Rt Hon. Sir Patrick Barnabas Burke Mayhew QC, Member of Parliament for Tunbridge Wells, 1974–97; Solicitor General, 1983–87; Attorney General, 1987–92; Secretary of State for Northern Ireland, 1992–97.
- Rt Hon. John Haggitt Charles Patten, Member of Parliament for Oxford West and Abingdon, 1983–97; (City of Oxford, 1979–83); Secretary of State for Education, 1992–94.
- Rt Hon. Ronald Timothy Renton, Member of Parliament for Mid-Sussex, 1974–97; Parliamentary Secretary to H.M. Treasury and Government Chief Whip, 1989–90; Minister of State, Privy Council Office (Minister for the Arts), 1990–92; Vice Chairman, British Council, since 1992.
- Rt Hon. Richard Andrew Ryder OBE, Member of Parliament for Mid-Norfolk, 1983–97; Parliamentary Secretary, Ministry of Agriculture, Fisheries and Food, 1988–89; Economic Secretary to H.M. Treasury, 1989–90; Paymaster General, 1990; Parliamentary Secretary to H.M. Treasury and Government Chief Whip, 1990–95.

=== Labour ===
- Rt Hon. Donald Dixon, Member of Parliament for Jarrow, 1979–97; Deputy Chief Opposition Whip, 1987–96.
- John Evans, Member of Parliament for St Helens North, 1983–97; Newton, 1974–83); UK Member of European Parliament, 1975–78; Labour Whip, 1978–79; Opposition Whip, 1979–80; Chairman, Labour Party, 1991–92; Opposition spokesman on employment, 1983–87.
- Rt Hon. Roy Sydney George Hattersley, Member of Parliament for Sparkbrook Division of Birmingham, 1964–97; Minister of Defence (Administration), 1969–70; Minister of State, Foreign and Commonwealth Office, 1974–76; Secretary of State for Prices and Consumer Protection, 1976–79; Principal Opposition spokesman on Environment, 1979–80; on Home Affairs, 1980–83; on Treasury and Economic Affairs, 1983–87; on Home Affairs, 1987–92; Deputy Leader of the Labour Party, 1983–92.
- Doug Hoyle, Member of Parliament for Warrington North, 1983–97; (Nelson and Colne, 1974–79; Warrington, 1981–83); Chairman, Parliamentary Labour Party, 1992–97.
- Joan Lestor, Member of Parliament for Eccles, 1987–97; (Eton and Slough, 1966–83); Parliamentary Under-Secretary of State, Department for Education and Science, 1969–70; Foreign and Commonwealth Office, 1974–75; Department for Education and Science, 1975–76; National Executive, Labour Party, 1967–82 (Chairman, 1977–78) and 1987–; frontbench spokesperson on overseas aid and development co-operation, 1988–89, on children's affairs, young offenders and race relations, 1989–92, on children and the family, 1993–94, on overseas development, 1994–96.
- Sir Geoffrey Lofthouse, Member of Parliament for Pontefract and Castleford, 1978–97; Deputy Chairman of Ways and Means and Deputy Speaker, House of Commons, 1992–97.
- Rt Hon. Peter David Shore, Member of Parliament for Bethnal Green and Stepney, 1983–97; (Stepney, 1964–74, Stepney and Poplar, 1974–83); Secretary of State for Economic Affairs, 1967–69; Minister Without Portfolio, 1969–70; Deputy Leader of the House of Commons, 1969–70; Opposition spokesman on Europe, 1971–74; Secretary of State for Trade, 1974–76; Secretary of State for the Environment, 1976–79; Opposition spokesman on Foreign Affairs, 1979–80; on Treasury and Economic Affairs, 1980–83; on Trade and Industry, 1983–84; Shadow Leader of the House of Commons, 1984–87.

=== Other ===
- David Patrick Paul Alton, Member of Parliament for Mossley Hill Division of Liverpool, 1983–97; (Edge Hill Division, 1979–83); Liberal Party spokesman on the environment and race relations, 1979–81; Home Affairs, 1981–82; Northern Ireland, 1987–88 (Alliance spokesman on Northern Ireland, 1987); Chief Whip, Liberal Party, 1985–87.
- Sir David Russell Johnston, Member of Parliament for Inverness, Nairn and Lochaber, 1983–97; (Inverness, 1964–83); Chairman, Scottish Liberal Party, 1970–74; Leader, Scottish Liberal Party, 1974–88; President, Scottish Liberal Democrats, 1988–94.
- Rt Hon. Sir James Henry Molyneaux KBE, Member of Parliament for Lagan Valley, 1983–97; (Antrim South, 1970–83); Leader, Ulster Unionist Party, 1979–95.
- Rt Hon. Sir David Martin Scott Steel KBE DL, Member of Parliament for Tweeddale, Ettrick and Lauderdale, 1983–97; (Roxburgh, Selkirk and Peebles, 1965–83); Leader of the Liberal Party, 1976–88; President of Liberal International, 1994–96.
