= Sir William Rutherford, 1st Baronet =

British politician

Sir William Watson Rutherford, 1st Baronet (1853 – 3 December 1927) was a Conservative party politician in the United Kingdom who was Member of Parliament and Lord Mayor of Liverpool.

== Early life ==
Rutherford was born in Liverpool in 1853, the eldest son of William Rutherford. He was educated at the Merchant Taylor′s school, Great Crosby, and was articled in 1870 to the solicitor John Hughes (who would later serve as mayor of the city in 1883). He was admitted a solicitor in 1875, and became a junior partner in the firm of Messrs. Miller, Peel and Hughes in 1878. After the death of Hughes, he became head of the firm.

He was elected to the City Council for Netherfield Ward in 1895, and was for a year chairman of the Tramways Committee overseeing the construction of electric trams in Liverpool.

Rutherford was an unsuccessful candidate in the 1900 general election for the Liverpool Scotland constituency. He was elected Lord Mayor of Liverpool in November 1902, but resigned in early January 1903 to be the candidate in a by-election for parliament.

=== 1903 by-election ===
Liverpool West Derby by-election, 1903
Party	Candidate	Votes	%	±%
Conservative	William Rutherford	5,455	62.7	N/A
Liberal	Richard Durning Holt	3,251	37.3	New
Majority		2,204	25.4	N/A
Turnout		8,706	73.6	N/A
Registered electors		11,824		
Conservative hold		Swing	N/A	

== Political career ==
After he was elected to parliament on 20 January 1903, he was also unanimously re-elected as mayor on 4 February 1903, and served the remainder of the mayoral term until November 1903.

He was the Member of Parliament (MP) for Liverpool West Derby from the January 1903 by-election until 1918, and for Liverpool Edge Hill from 1918 to 1923.

He was knighted in the 1918 New Year Honours and made a baronet in the 1923 Birthday Honours.

He was a key member of Liverpool Chess Club, and developed the Rutherford Code for transmitting chess moves over a telegraph.

Parliament of the United Kingdom
Preceded by Samuel Wasse Higginbottom	Member of Parliament for Liverpool West Derby; 1903–1918	Succeeded by Sir F. E. Smith
New constituency	Member of Parliament for Liverpool Edge Hill; 1918–1923	Succeeded by John Henry Hayes
Baronetage of the United Kingdom
New creation	Baronet (of Liverpool); 1923–1927	Succeeded by (John) Hugo Rutherford
