= Inter-Parliamentary Alliance on China =

International, cross-party alliance of parliamentarians

- Formation: June 4, 2020; 6 years ago
- Purpose: Reform democratic countries' approach to the People's Republic of China and the Chinese Communist Party
- Website: ipac.global

The Inter-Parliamentary Alliance on China (IPAC) is an international, cross-party alliance of parliamentarians, mostly from liberal democratic countries, focused on relations with the People's Republic of China (PRC), and specifically, the Chinese Communist Party (CCP). It was established on June 4, 2020, on the anniversary of the 1989 Tiananmen Square protests and massacre. The alliance comprises over 290 members from 43 legislatures and the European Parliament. Each legislature represented takes turns to chair the alliance on a rotating basis. Its purpose is to create a coordinated response to China on global trade, security and human rights.

== History ==
=== Founding ===
In its founding statement, the alliance stated that "countries that have tried to stand up to Beijing have mostly done so alone — and often at great cost." Many of those who first signed the declaration have been affected by overseas censorship of Chinese issues in recent years. Co-chair James Paterson and member Andrew Hastie were banned from visiting China after meeting with Uyghur dissidents and writing about the threat of China to Australian democracy. Germany's co-chair Michael Brand experienced "massive pressure" to delete comments about Tibet and later had a travel ban imposed on him. Canadian parliamentarians joined the alliance after the CCP restricted imports on some Canadian goods and detained Canadians nationals Michael Spavor and Michael Kovrig after Canada arrested Meng Wanzhou on charges of fraud. Belgium co-chair Samuel Cogolati being the subject of cyber attack by a Chinese state actor, after writing a resolution on Uyghur Muslims in China, and Els Van Hoof being warned by China not to visit Taiwan. Sweden's co-chair Fredrik Malm spoke at a solidarity rally for Hong Kong in September 2019. Some weeks later China's Ambassador to Sweden, Gui Congyou addressed Swedish listeners and said, "We treat our friends with fine wine, but for our enemies we have shotguns." This type of intimidating language is one of the features of China's new generation of "wolf warrior diplomats." Despite this intimidation, many representatives from the world's democracies wish to maintain their "long-standing concerns over human rights and trade practices".

=== COVID-19 and Hong Kong ===
Two contemporaneous events triggered the formation of the alliance: China's initial attempt to suppress news of what eventually became the COVID-19 pandemic and Beijing's plan to criminalize dissent in the semi-autonomous territory of Hong Kong.

China's "lack of transparency over the COVID-19 pandemic" meant that many democratic nations felt compelled to confront the CCP. When Australia moved to hold China accountable for its actions, or inactions, around the outbreak first detected in Wuhan, China quickly imposed new tariffs on Australian barley and outright bans on some of its beef, then went on to warn Chinese citizens against traveling to the country. Conservative Canadian MP and co-chair, Garnett Genuis said, "We don’t want to be in a situation where individual countries are targeted and isolated one at a time."

Beijing's plans to criminalise dissent, became the final impetus for the new alliance. Baroness Kennedy condemned "unilateral introduction of national security legislation in Hong Kong" Kennedy, a Labour Party member of the House of Lords, would later reach out to form the permanent alliance with Conservative MP Iain Duncan Smith. Joining them came US Republican Senator Marco Rubio and Democratic Senator Bob Menendez, both longtime critics of the CCP and key supporters of US legislation targeting China over its actions against Hong Kong's autonomy.

In short, the emergence of the alliance indicates "there is growing backlash against China’s increasing assertiveness.” In view of the human rights abuses and the intimidation of democratic nations, democratic legislators such as Reinhard Bütikofer felt they "cannot return to business as normal." For many, this decision came with a sense of shame that the free world had been "naive" in its approach to China, that, as Duncan Smith put it, there had been an "unfounded" hope that free markets would lead Beijing to democratic reforms.

=== 2021 email hack ===
In 2021, an advanced persistent threat group associated with the Hubei State Security Department in Wuhan, APT31, targeted the emails of every European Union IPAC member and 43 United Kingdom parliamentary accounts. In March 2024, the United States Department of Justice indicted seven Chinese nationals affiliated with APT31. The UK government and the United States Department of the Treasury's Office of Foreign Assets Control (OFAC) jointly sanctioned a Chinese Ministry of State Security front company called Wuhan Xiaoruizhi Science and Technology and affiliated individuals linked to APT31 for breaching the UK Electoral Commission and placing malware in critical infrastructure.

=== 2024 Taiwan summit and pressure campaign ===
In July 2024, lawmakers from at least six countries received various forms of electronic communications from Chinese diplomats pressuring them not to attend the first IPAC summit in Taiwan. At the summit, IPAC lawmakers agreed on a resolution to counter China's interpretation of United Nations General Assembly Resolution 2758 (XXVI) in their home country legislatures. During the summit, Taiwan officially became a member of IPAC.

== Focus ==
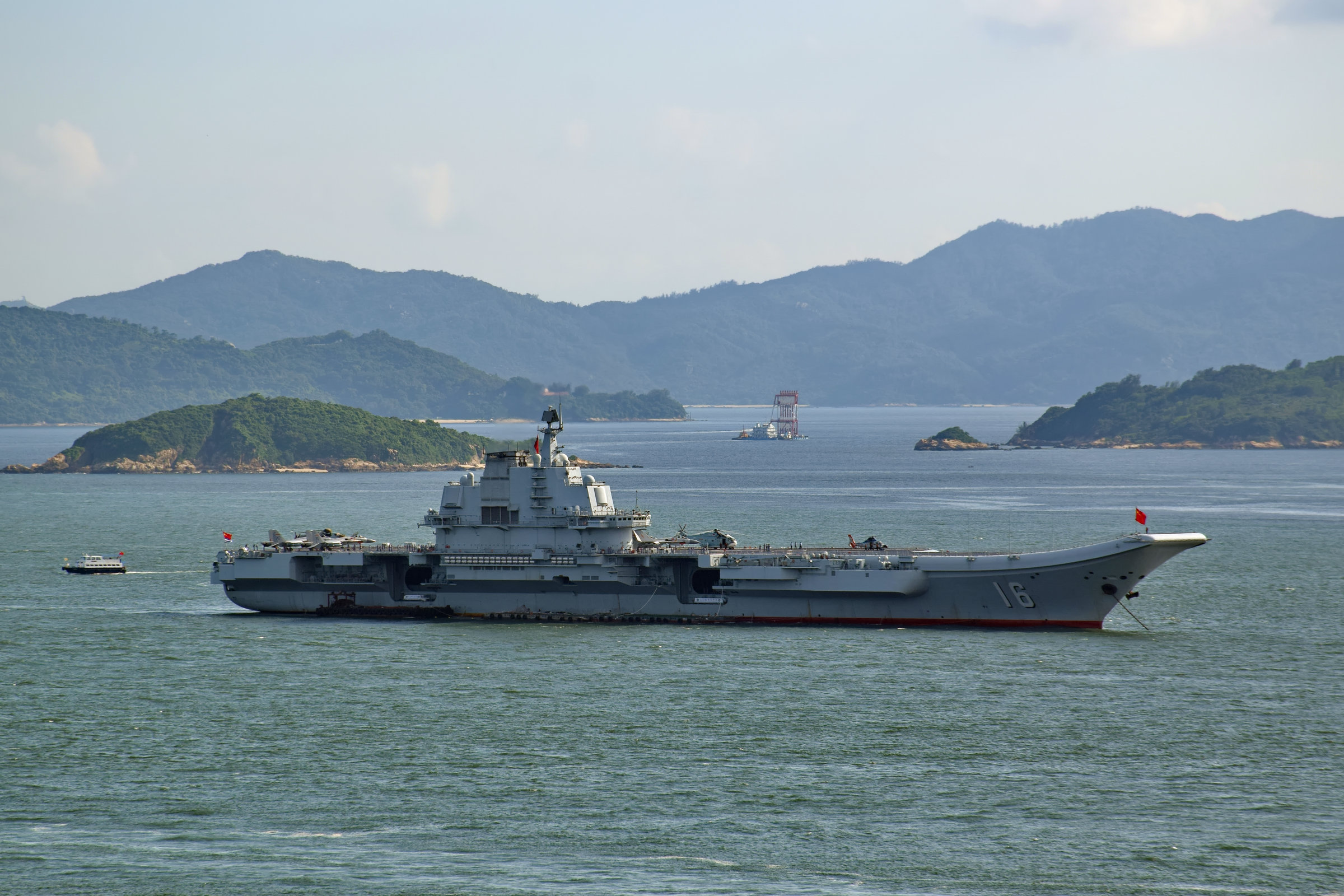
People's Liberation Army Navy Aircraft Carrier Liaoning CV in Hong Kong waters.

The alliance sees China's relationship to the world, at least under Communist Party general secretary Xi Jinping, as being a threat to many democratic values. Overall, the group aims "to help counter what they say is the threat China’s growing influence poses to global trade, security and human rights." The Inter-Parliamentary Alliance on China focuses on:

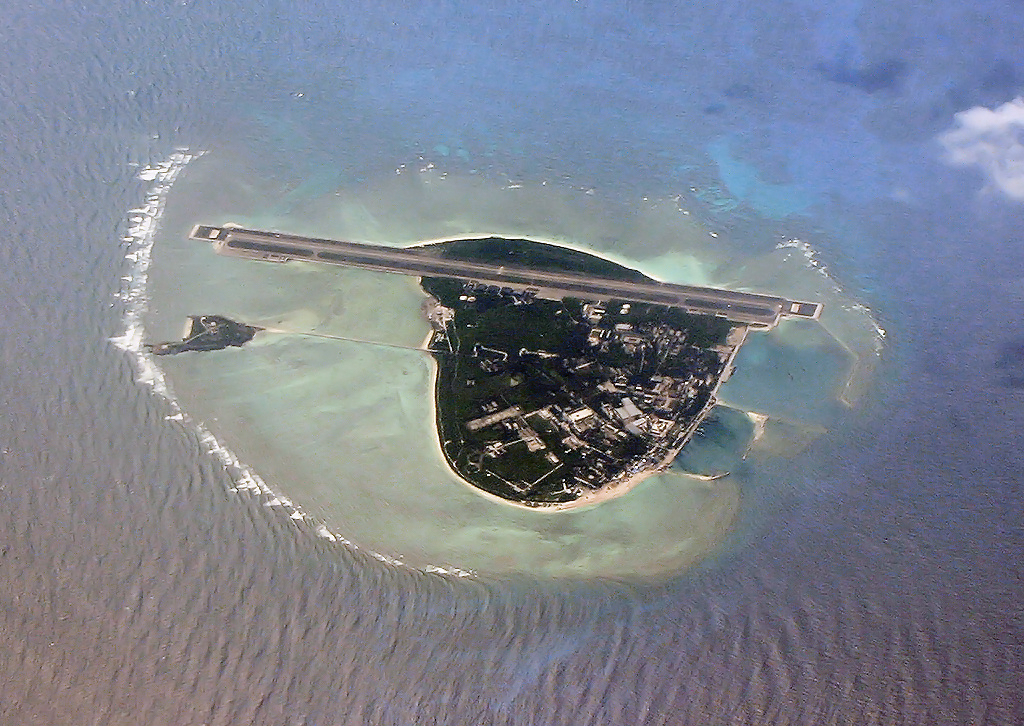
Woody Island, a disputed territory in the South China Sea, is currently occupied by China, and has been used for landing long-range bombers of the People's Liberation Army Air Force.

=== International rules-based order ===
In the aftermath of World War II global institutions were formed, chiefly the United Nations, the World Bank and the International Monetary Fund so that international questions, from trading arrangements to the recognition of territorial borders, are settled according to agreed rules, rather than mere force. Members of the alliance, such as Mike Gallagher of the United States, are concerned that China is undermining the rules based order, with, for example, "illegitimate efforts to build and militarize islands in the region."

=== Human rights ===
Many members are driven by their concern for what they see as China's "egregious human rights violations". — to use the phrase of British member, David Alton — especially towards its own minority groups, particularly Uyghurs and Tibetan people. Canadian member Dan Albas has expressed concerns about the Chinese Government's "crackdowns on legitimate protests and concentration camps for Uighur Muslims." Similarly, Fabian Molina has moved in the Swiss legislature that "Stop crimes against humanity in Xinjiang or suspend free trade with China." Founding co-chair Baroness Kennedy has a particular concern for the poor treatment of lawyers and human rights defenders in China. Some members are hopeful that new instruments for holding China to account on its human rights abuses will emerge. Lianchao Han (a fellow of the Hudson Institute) and Jianli Yang (a survivor of Tiananmen Square) described the formation of the alliance as "a significant step toward confronting China collectively on its human rights abuses and other important issues."

=== Trade ===
Many alliance members view China as interfering in their domestic markets through what they consider to be dumping, which is the activity of selling goods in order to eliminate or damage a competitor.

=== Security ===
For several founding co-chairs, such as Australia's Andrew Hastie, China's actions on the world stage, particularly in the South China Sea have revealed the regime to be "revisionist and expansionist" revisionist China is a test of "our alliances and our security like no other time." For co-chair Gen Nakatani (a former Minister of Defence in Japan) the activity of the People's Liberation Army in the region being "dangerous actions" that have a direct "impact on our national security."

=== Integrity of political systems ===
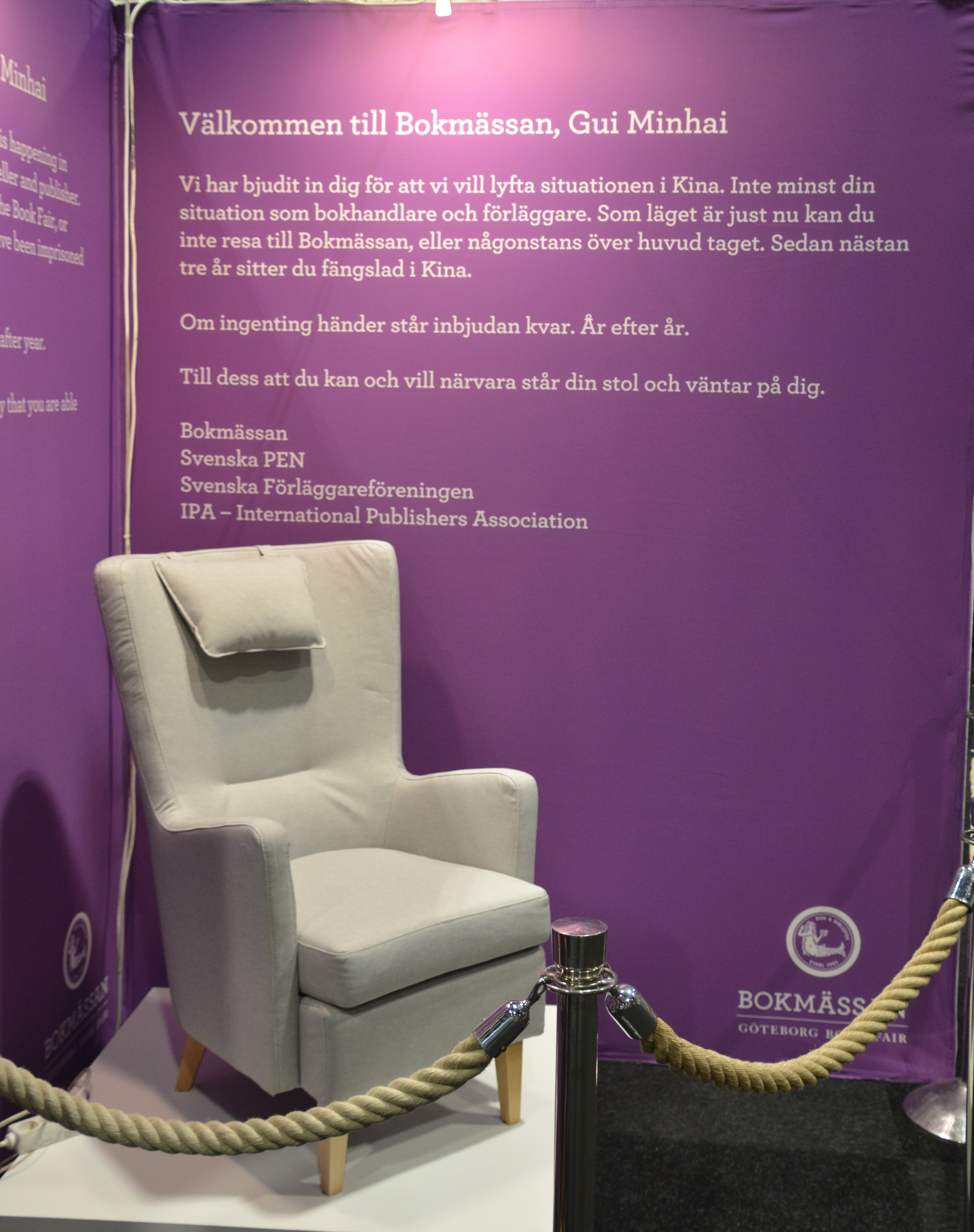
Award in absentia of Tucholsky Prize to Gui Minhai, a bookseller and Swedish national who disappeared in October 2015.

Members of the alliance, including Germany's Margarete Bause, are seeing China as attempting to "encroach" on their democratic systems. Several member nations, such as Australia and Sweden, have experienced China actively seeking to influence their institutions, such as Norway's awarding of its Nobel prize to Liu Xiaobo, Sweden's awarding Gui Minhai, or the Australian Labor Party receiving cash donations from patrons connected to the United Front Work Department and its affiliates. Preserving national integrity means preventing CCP attempts at interference in the running of national institutions such as parliaments and the media. Hence their stated principle that, "Democratic states must maintain the integrity of their political systems, and actively seek to preserve a marketplace of ideas free from distortion."

== Campaigns ==
=== Treatment of Uyghurs in Xinjiang ===
Members of the Alliance have been leading calls for political action in response to the ongoing human rights abuses in the Xinjiang Uygur Autonomous Region, which include the forced internment of over one million Uyghurs and other Turkic Muslims in re-education camps and the persecution of Uyghurs in China. The campaign was launched after the Associated Press documented a report by Professor Adrian Zenz which focused on a Chinese Government birth prevention programme in Xinjiang.

IPAC co-chairs signed a joint statement in response to the revelations calling for a United Nations led investigation into the alleged atrocities. The statement was followed up by interventions from members of the Alliance in the European Parliament, the Italian Senate, the British House of Commons and the United States Congress. As a result, the British Government, for the first time, alongside EU, Canada and US, imposed sanctions against 4 senior Chinese officials, as well as the Public Security Bureau of the Xinjiang Production and Construction Corps.

=== Hong Kong National Security Law ===
The passing of the National Security Law in Hong Kong was met with severe condemnation and calls to action from members of the Alliance. A joint statement from the co-chairs of the Alliance called for an international “lifeboat” scheme for Hong Kong citizens at risk of political persecution, and for countries to “review and recalibrate” relations with China in order to reduce “strategic dependency”.

In a coordinated bi-partisan response IPAC members Senator Marco Rubio, Senator Bob Menendez, Representative Mike Gallagher and Representative Joaquin Castro introduced the Hong Kong Safe Harbor Act in both chambers of the US Congress.

IPAC members also made public statements on the issue in Australia, the European Union, Italy, Japan, Lithuania and the United Kingdom.

=== No Extradition to Hong Kong ===
The Alliance is coordinating efforts to call for no extradition to Hong Kong, where it claims the rule of law is severely compromised following the passing of the National Security Law.

Australia and Canada suspended their extradition treaties with Hong Kong, followed by United Kingdom, United States and New Zealand.

=== Push to boycott Beijing 2022 ===
On 20 August 2020, Iain Duncan Smith gave a radio interview in London and raised doubts about the UK being able to participate in the 2022 Winter Olympics, due to be hosted by Beijing.

"China has broken all the rules on free markets, subsidising huge businesses like Huawei, driven other businesses in the free world out of business... they are threatening Australia with sanctions and bullying them because they asked for an independent review on COVID-19 in China. If you add to that the concentration camps and the terrible human rights abuses in Hong Kong, you ask yourself the question, how do you get the point across that no country can behave like this?"

Four weeks later, 160 human rights groups wrote a letter to the chief of the International Olympic Committee asking it to consider China's poor human rights record — and revise its decision to let Beijing host the 2022 Winter Games. On 22 September 2020, speaking as the co-chair of the Inter-Parliamentary Alliance on China, Duncan Smith made a more assertive statement asking the IOC to think again about allowing China to hosting the games, addressing China with the words:

"The free world does have a strong position to say the bullying, the threatening, the internal repression, the border disputes, the arrogant attitude to your neighbours, the breaking of the treaty with Hong Kong — these must have consequences."

=== Labour camps in Tibet ===
On 22 September 2020, the Alliance co-published a report by Professor Adrian Zenz describing an apparent widespread system of forced labor in the Tibetan Autonomous Region perpetrated by the Chinese government. The co-chairs released a joint statement in which they call upon their governments to take immediate action to condemn the atrocities and to prevent further human rights abuses.

=== Introducing Magnitsky laws to target CCP officials ===
In March 2021, the European Union joined Britain and Canada to introduce sanctions on Chinese government officials, as a response to the persecution of Uyghurs. The joint action was publicly endorsed by the UK's foreign secretary Dominic Raab who said "we are sending the clearest message to the Chinese government that the international community will not turn a blind eye to such serious and systemic human rights violations." The sanctions involving travel bans and asset freezes, were levelled against the leadership of the Public Security Bureau of the Xinjiang Production and Construction Corps including Zhu Hailun and Wang Junzheng. The new law was strongly supported by I-PAC and, in turn, it was announced, China retaliated by sanctioning European MPs who are members of the alliance.

=== Genocide amendment ===
In September 2020, Iain Duncan Smith, who is "convinced that the Chinese government was 'performing the systematic eradication of the Uighur people'", said that the IPAC had "proposed an amendment to (a UK) trade bill which states that if it is deemed that a country is practicing genocide then the trade arrangements with that country should not stand". By March 2021, the initiative was causing a rebellion in the Conservative Party, where many MPs joined opposition members to support the amendment.

== Membership ==
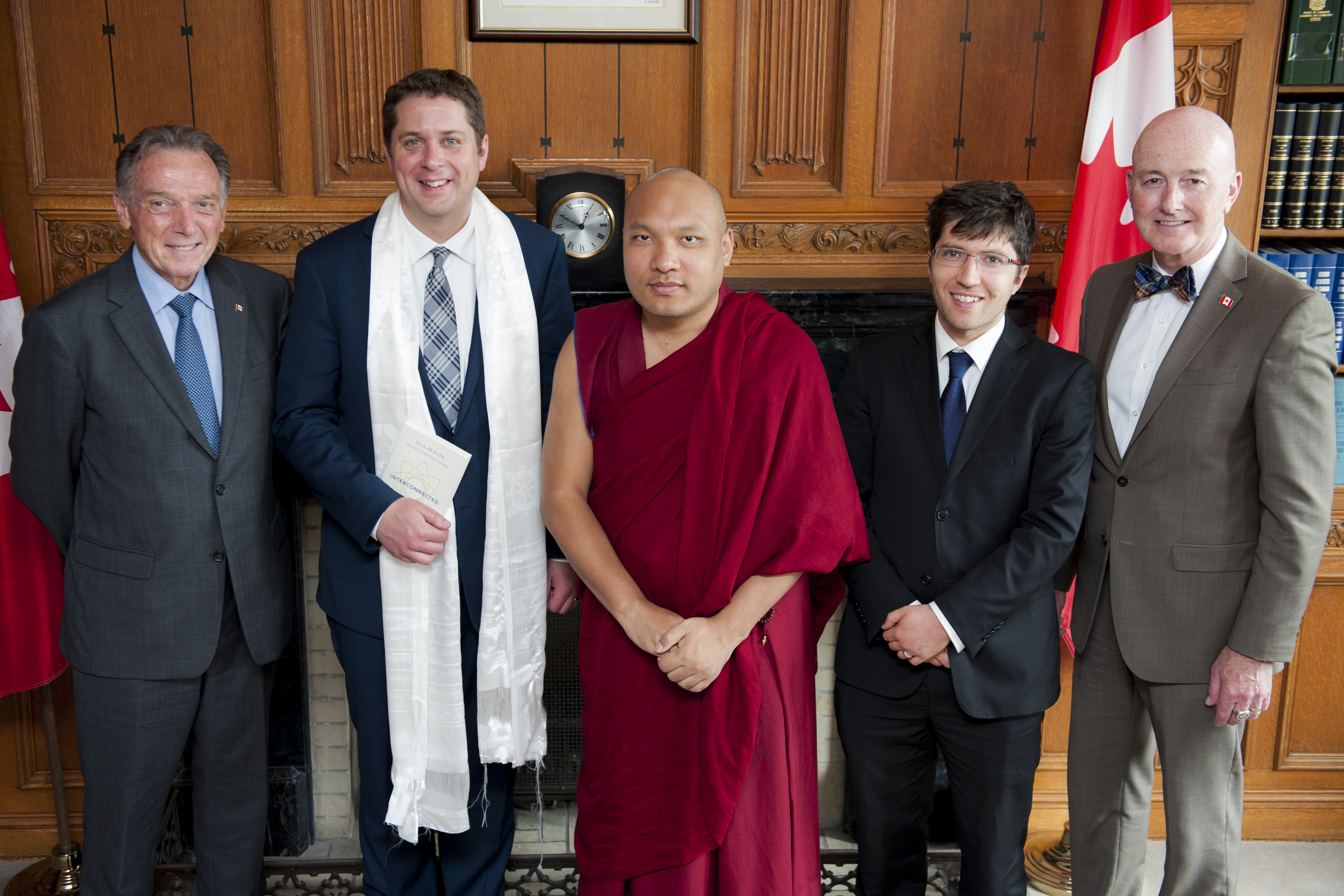
Peter Kent, Andrew Scheer, the 17th Karmapa, with alliance members Garnett Genuis and David Sweet - who have longstanding concerns around the CCP's restrictions on religious freedom in Tibet.

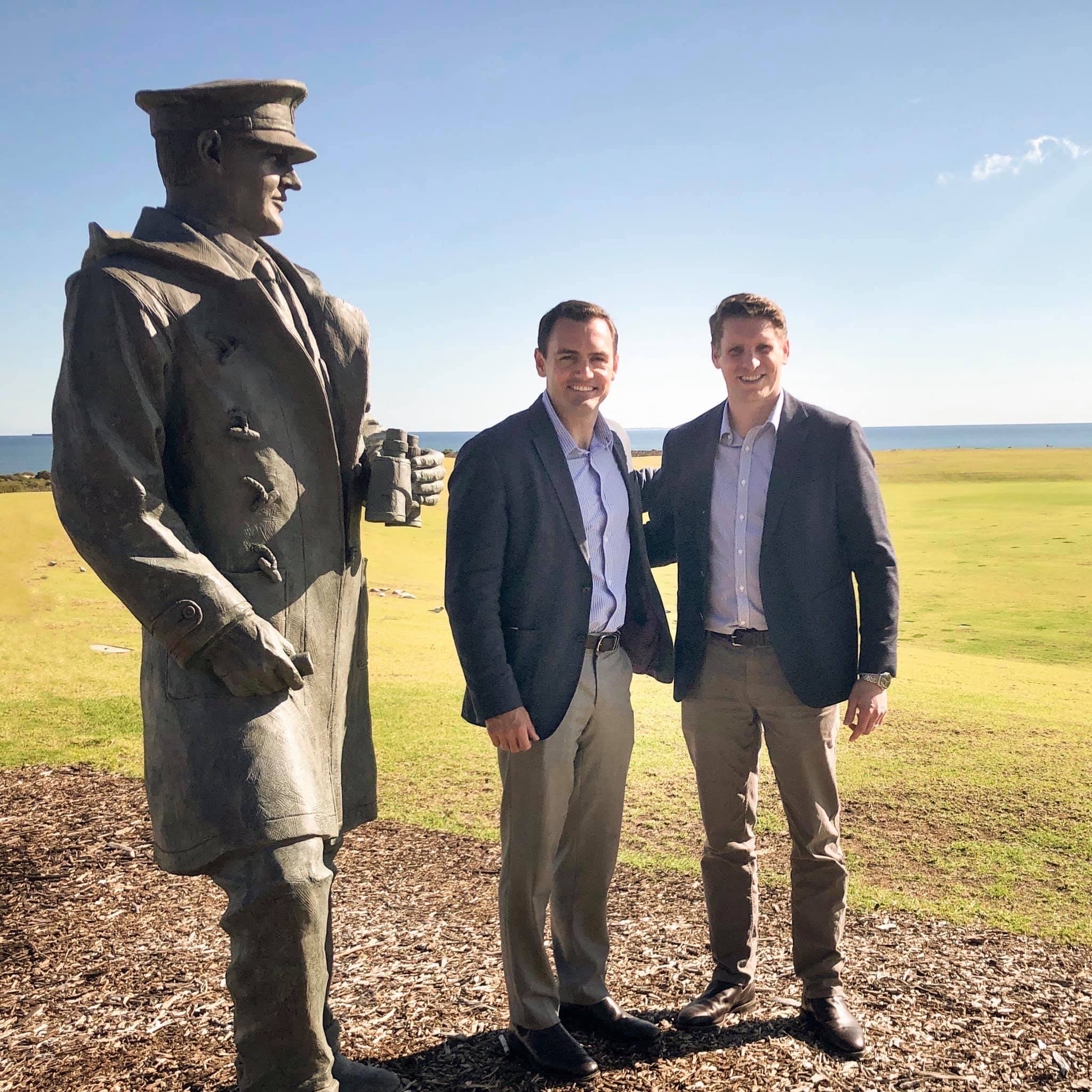
US congressman and early alliance member Mike Gallagher seen with Australian MP and founding co-chair Andrew Hastie

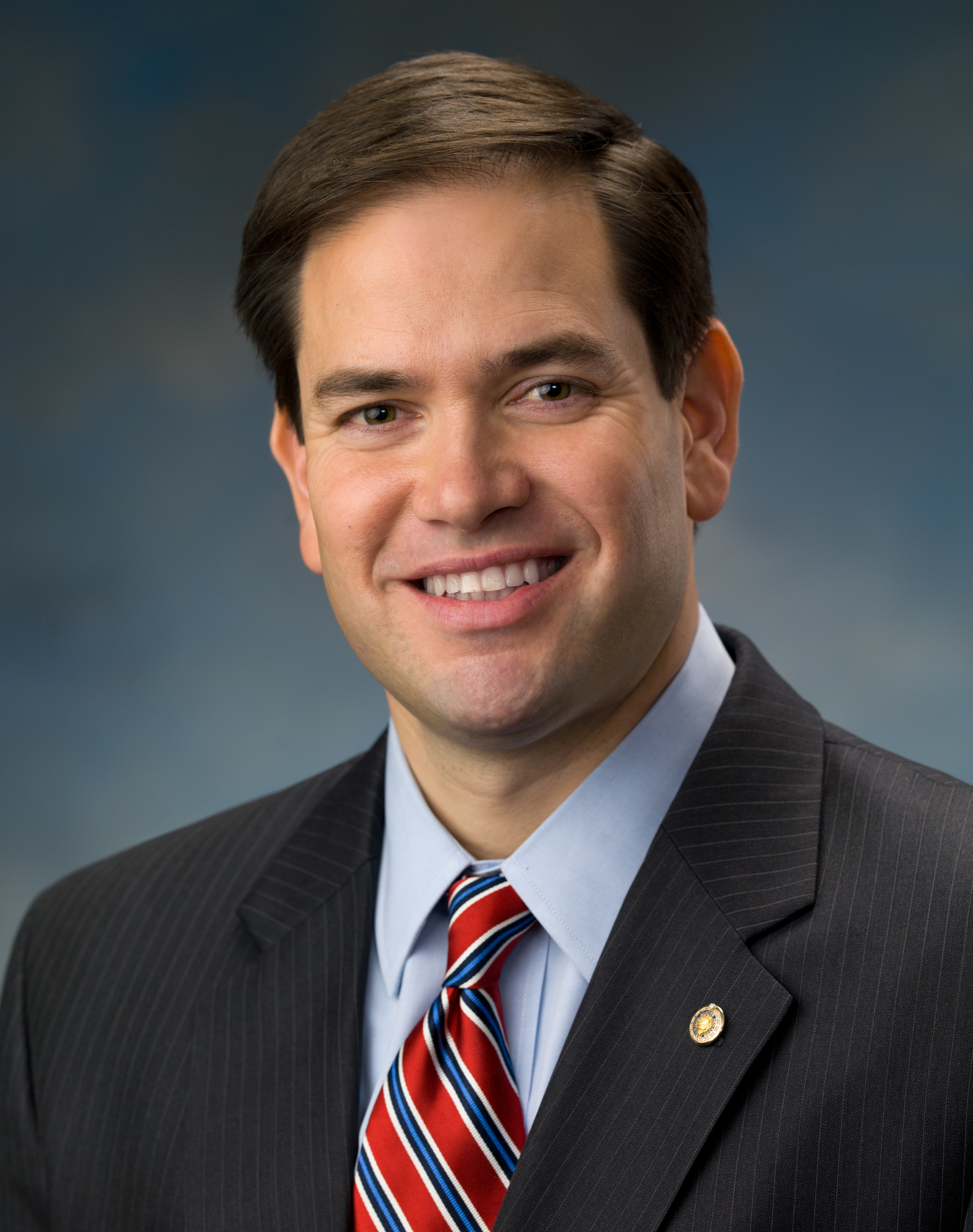
Marco Rubio, who has criticised the CCP's human rights record, is a founding co-chair of the IPAC

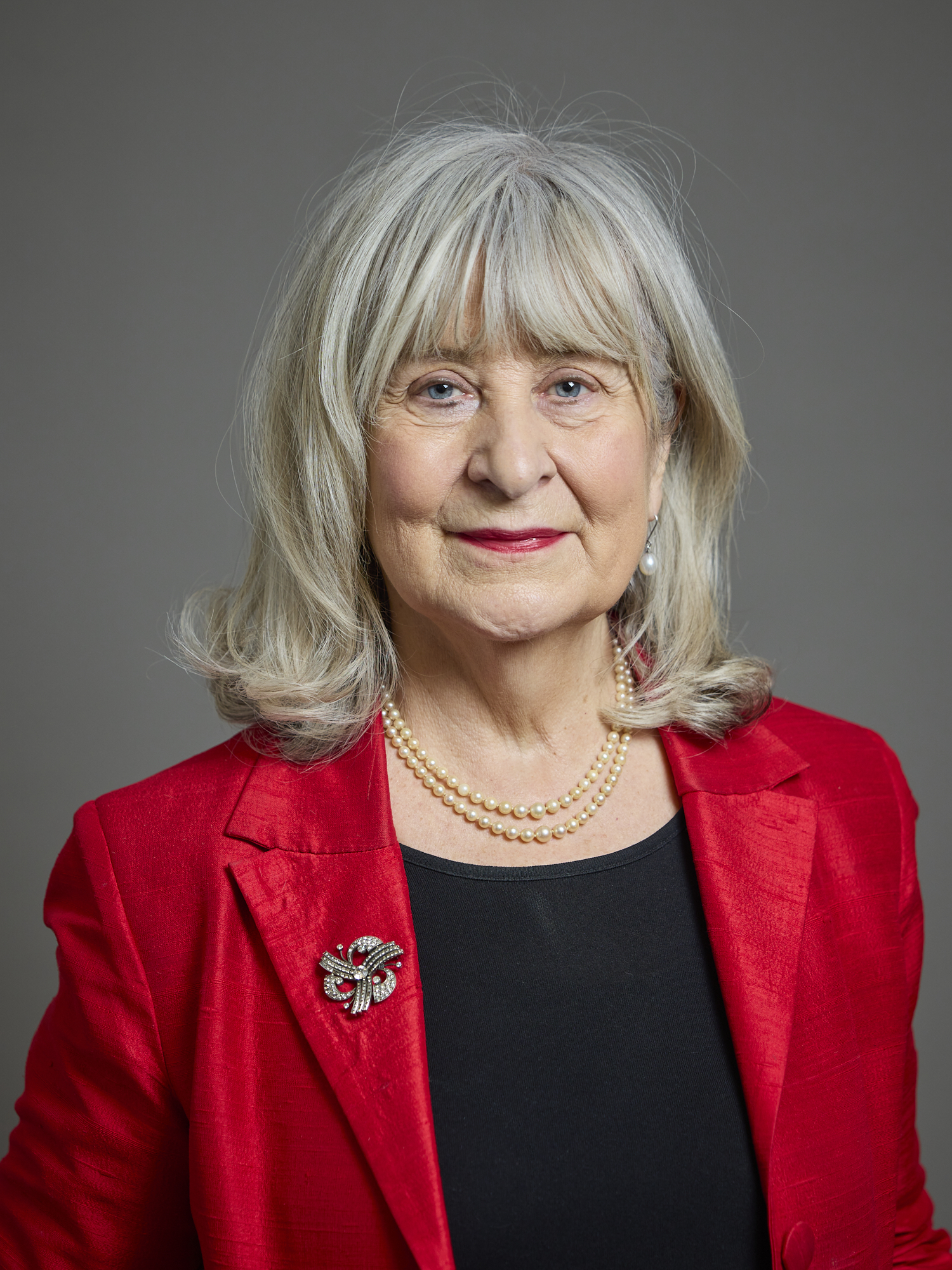
Baroness Kennedy of The Shaws, one of the founding co-chairs of the IPAC, has been a strong critic of China's crackdown on the Hong Kong democracy movement

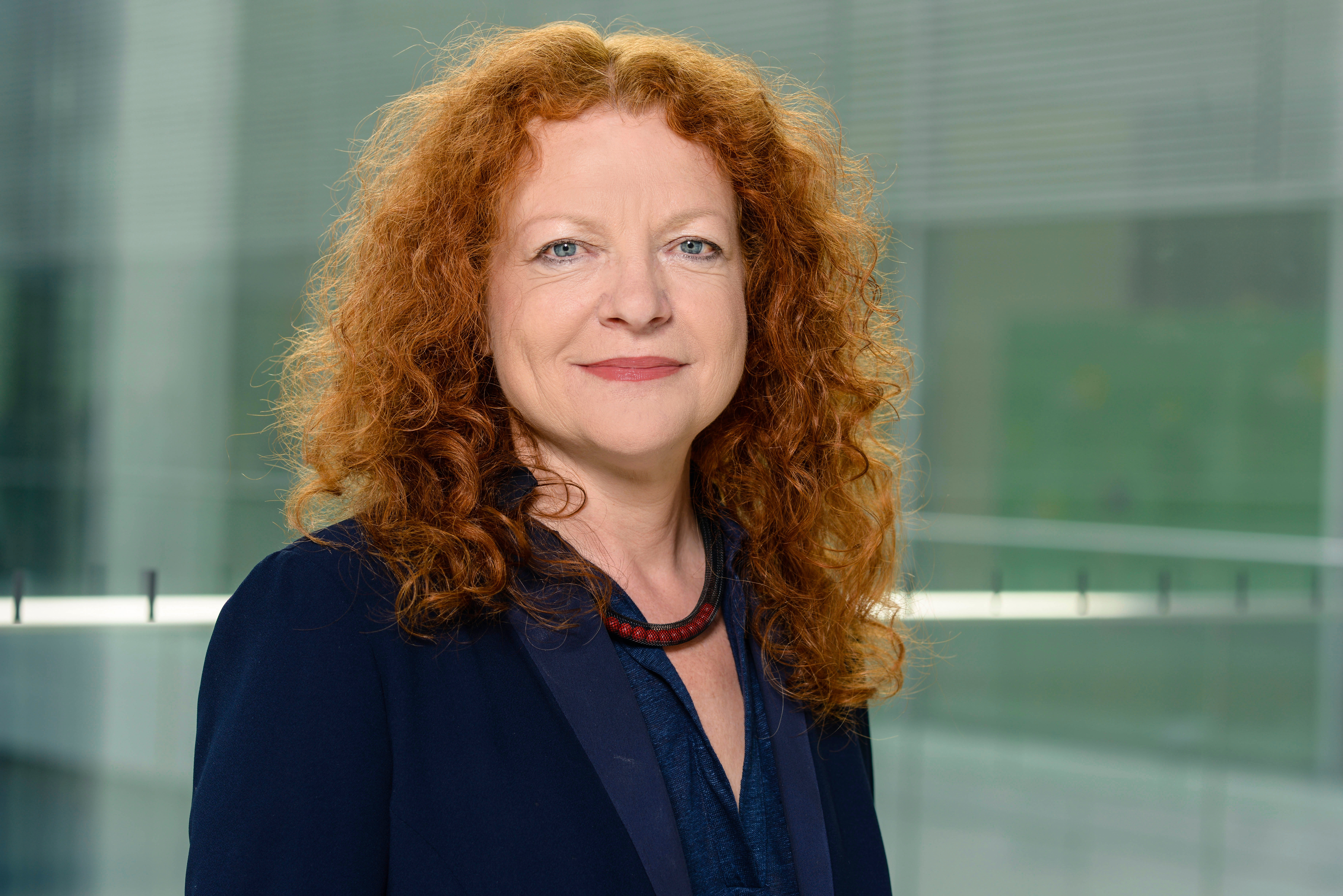
Margarete Bause, an Alliance 90/The Greens member of the Bundestag in Germany, is one of the 18 founding co-chairs of the Inter-Parliamentary Alliance on China.

The alliance states that its goal is to promote and protect democracy globally, it has been described as "one of the most geographically and politically diverse coalitions ever". The founding 18 members of the alliance came from the legislatures of eight nations, Australia, Canada, Germany, Japan, Norway, Sweden, the United Kingdom, the United States as well as the European Parliament.

Within a week of its launch, the number of members had increased from 18 to over 100 lawmakers, and the total number of democratic nations in the alliance has increased from 8 to 19, including all five of the Five Eyes security alliance. Each nation is represented in the Alliance by two co-chairs, senior politicians who lead the Alliance's work in that nation.

In a statement, the founding co-chairs said:

China under the rule of the Chinese Communist party represents a global challenge... When countries have stood up for the values and human rights, they have done so alone, sometimes, at great cost. No country should have to shoulder this burden alone.... The Inter-Parliamentary Alliance on China has been created to promote a coordinated response between democratic states to challenges posed by the present conduct and future ambitions of the People’s Republic of China. By developing a common set of principles and frameworks that transcend domestic party divisions and international borders, our democracies will be able to keep the rules-based and human rights systems true to their founding purposes.

The work of the Alliance membership is supported in an operational capacity by a team comprising the Central Secretariat. This is led by Luke de Pulford, co-founder of the Arise Foundation and Coalition for Genocide Response. A number of individuals act as advisors to the Alliance, including Anne-Marie Brady, Wei Jingsheng, Rahima Mahmut and Robert Suettinger.

=== List of members ===
As of November 11, 2026, membership consists of parliamentarians from the following countries below: (Countries with liberal democracy and electoral democracy scores, respectively, of under 0.5 in the latest V-Dem rankings are marked with one asterisk and two asterisks)

Founding nations:

- Australia
- Canada
- Germany
- Japan
- Norway
- Sweden
- United Kingdom
- United States
- European Union

Joined in June 2020:

- New Zealand
- Netherlands
- Lithuania
- Switzerland
- Uganda**
- Belgium
- Czech Republic
- France
- Italy
- Denmark

Joined in 2021 and 2022:

- Albania*
- Ireland
- India**
- Kosovo*
- Romania*
- Ukraine**

Joined in 2023:

- Kenya*
- Philippines**
- Paraguay*

Joined in 2024:

- Republic of China (Taiwan)
- Bolivia*
- Bosnia and Herzegovina*
- Colombia
- Iraq**
- Malawi (withdrew under China's pressure)
- Solomon Islands
- Gambia (withdrew under China's pressure)
- Uruguay
- Serbia**
- Montenegro*
- North Macedonia*

Joined in 2025:

- Fiji*
- Panama
- Estonia
- Latvia
- Zambia*
- Zimbabwe**

== Criticism ==
The alliance has been the target of criticism from Chinese Communist Party officials. The formation of the alliance was dismissed by the government of the People's Republic of China with its representative in London, Chen Wen, saying, “It's a misinterpretation of China’s foreign policy and a misreading of the current world situation. China is a force for positive change.” Geng Shuang, a spokesman for the Foreign Ministry of the People's Republic of China, has criticized the group, saying in a press conference that "[w]e urge this handful of politicians to respect facts and basic norms of international relations, discard their Cold War mentality and ideological prejudice, and stop exploiting various issues to interfere in China's internal affairs and political manipulation for selfish gains. We hope that they will find ways to contribute constructively to international solidarity and cooperation."

== See also ==
- Human rights in China
- Blue Dot Network
- Alliance of Democracies
- United States House Select Committee on Strategic Competition between the United States and the Chinese Communist Party
