= Richard Clitherow =

British politician (1902–1947)

Richard Clitherow (18 January 1902 – 3 June 1947) was a Labour Party politician in the United Kingdom.

Born in Liverpool, Clitherow was educated at the University of Liverpool, qualifying as a doctor and pharmacist. From 1919 until 1922, he served in the North West Mounted Police in Canada, then returned to the UK and served in the Liverpool City Police. In 1927, he moved to the United States to work as a pharmacist, then did the same job in China, but returned again to Liverpool in 1930.

Clitherow joined the Conservative Party, and won election to Liverpool City Council in 1937. However, in 1943, he defected to the Labour Party. He was elected as Member of Parliament (MP) for Liverpool Edge Hill at the 1945 general election, but died in office in 1947, aged 45. He had been "run down and jaded", taking an overdose of seven barbitone tablets, which was described by the pathologist as a "bold dose". A verdict of accidental death was recorded at the inquest. After his death, the by-election for his seat was won by Labour's Arthur Irvine.

Parliament of the United Kingdom
Preceded by Alexander Critchley	Member of Parliament for Liverpool Edge Hill; 1945–1947	Succeeded by Arthur Irvine
