= Jack Hayes (British politician) =

British police officer, trade unionist and politician

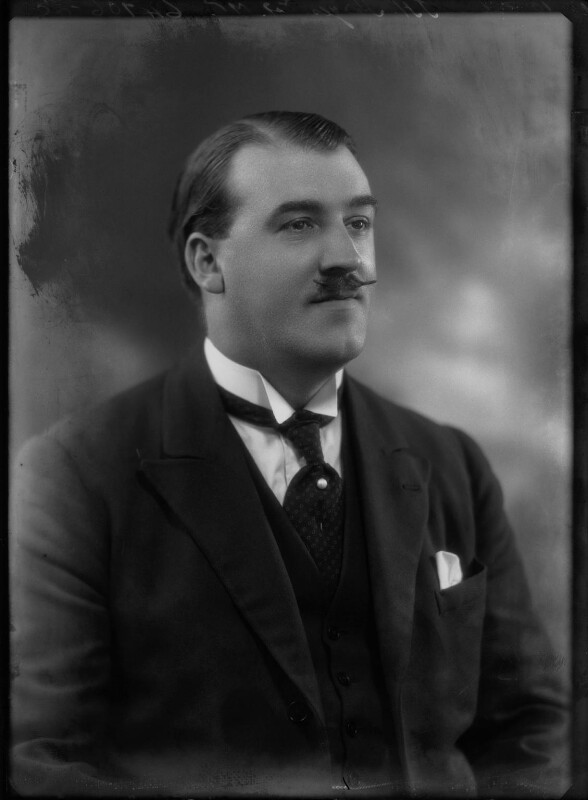
- Hayes in 1924

Vice-Chamberlain of the Household
- In office 1929–1931
- Prime Minister: Ramsay MacDonald
- Preceded by: Sir Frederick Thomson
- Succeeded by: Sir Frederick Thomson

Member of Parliament; for Liverpool Edge Hill
- In office 6 March 1923 – 27 October 1931
- Preceded by: William Rutherford
- Succeeded by: Hugo Rutherford

Personal details
- Born: John Henry Hayes; 14 October 1887 Wolverhampton, England
- Died: 25 April 1941 (aged 53) London, England
- Party: Labour
- Occupation: Police officer, trade union leader, politician

John Henry Hayes (14 October 1887 – 25 April 1941) was a British police officer, trade unionist and politician. After serving in the Metropolitan Police, he became general secretary of the National Union of Police and Prison Officers. In 1923, he became the first Labour Member of Parliament in Liverpool when he was elected to represent Edge Hill. From 1929 to 1931, he served in government as Vice-Chamberlain of the Household.

== Early life and police career ==
Hayes was born on 14 October 1887 in Wolverhampton to policeman John William Hayes and his wife Sarah Inchley. He married Ethel Stroudley in 1913 and they had one daughter.

He joined the administrative staff of the Metropolitan Police in 1909. He became known for speaking for officer's rights and the right to union organization, and he was an early member of the National Union of Police and Prison Officers. He rose to sergeant, and resigned from the force to become the union's general secretary 1919. The Police Act 1919 made union membership unlawful and Hayes led the 1919 strike it failed to gain widespread support and striking officers were dismissed, leaving Hayes devastated.

== Politics ==
The strike received support in Liverpool, and Hayes became involved in the politics of the city. After standing unsuccessfully in the 1919 local elections, he became the Labour Party parliamentary candidate for Liverpool Edge Hill for the 1922 general election. He was defeated by the Conservative incumbent, but won the seat during the 1923 by-election to become the first Labour Member of Parliament in Liverpool and the first former policeman to sit in the Commons. In the 1924 government he became Parliamentary Private Secretary to Pensions Minister Frederick Roberts, and he was a member of the party's national executive in 1926 and 1927. He served as a whip from 1925 to 1931, including as Vice-Chamberlain of the Household in the second Ramsay MacDonald ministry, 1929–1931.

He refused to join the National Government of 1931, and lost his seat in the October election later that year. He ran again in 1935 but was unsuccessful, leading to his political career to rapidly fade.

He died in London on 25 April 1941 after suffering from kidney disease.

Parliament of the United Kingdom
Preceded by Sir William Rutherford, Bt	Member of Parliament for Liverpool Edge Hill; 1923–1931	Succeeded by Sir Hugo Rutherford, Bt
Political offices
Preceded by Sir Frederick Thomson, Bt	Vice-Chamberlain of the Household; 1929–1931	Succeeded by Sir Frederick Thomson, Bt
