= 1979 Liverpool Edge Hill by-election =

UK Parliamentary by-election

- 29 March 1979

Constituency of Liverpool Edge Hill
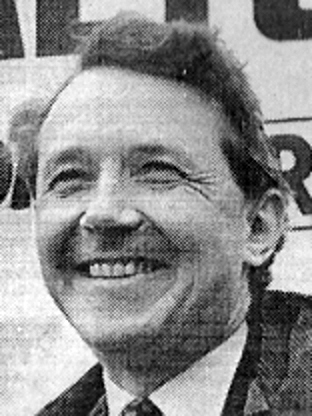
	First party	Second party	Third party
		Lab	Con
Candidate	David Alton	Bob Wareing	Nicholas Ward
Party	Liberal	Labour	Conservative
Popular vote	12,945	4,812	1,906
Percentage	64.1%	23.8%	9.4%
Swing	▲36.8%	▼28.1%	▼11.3%
MP before election
Arthur Irvine
Labour
Elected MP
David Alton
Liberal

The 1979 Liverpool Edge Hill by-election was a parliamentary by-election held on 29 March 1979 to elect a new Member of Parliament (MP) for the UK House of Commons constituency of Liverpool Edge Hill.

Polling in the by-election took place one day after the government of James Callaghan had lost a vote of no confidence in parliament and slightly over a month before the 1979 general election. The seat had become vacant in the previous December, upon the death of the constituency's Labour Party MP Sir Arthur Irvine, who had held the seat since a by-election in 1947.

The result was a gain for the Liberal Party, represented by David Alton. Having made his maiden speech on 3 April, just before the House rose for the election, he was re-elected a few weeks later, and from 1983 held the Mossley Hill seat until he stood down from the Commons in 1997, 18 years after the by-election.

== Result ==
Liverpool Edge Hill by-election, 1979
Party	Candidate	Votes	%	±%
Liberal	David Alton	12,945	64.1	+36.8
Labour	Bob Wareing	4,812	23.8	−28.1
Conservative	Nicholas Ward	1,906	9.4	−11.3
Law and Order	Joan Jonker	337	1.7	New
Socialist Unity	Ann Walker	127	0.6	New
Gay Liberal	Michael Taylor	40	0.2	New
Democratic Monarchist, Public Safety, White Resident	Bill Boaks	32	0.2	New
Majority		8,133	40.3	N/A
Turnout		20,199	56.6%	−4.6
Liberal gain from Labour		Swing	+32.4	

== See also ==
- Liverpool Edge Hill (UK Parliament constituency)
- 1947 Liverpool Edge Hill by-election
- List of United Kingdom by-elections
- List of parliamentary constituencies in Merseyside
