= Alexander Critchley =

British politician (1893–1974)

Member of Parliament for Liverpool Edge Hill
- In office 1935–1945
- Preceded by: Hugo Rutherford
- Succeeded by: Richard Clitherow

Personal details
- Born: 17 December 1893 Ormskirk, England
- Died: 4 September 1974 (aged 80)
- Party: Conservative Party
- Spouse: Lucy Lindsay (m. 1925)
- Parent: William Edwin Critchley (father)
- Education: University of Liverpool

Alexander Critchley (17 December 1893 – 4 September 1974) was a British Conservative politician. He was elected a member of parliament for Liverpool Edge Hill in 1935 until 1945, when he stood down. An accountant by profession, he was also a member of Liverpool City Council. In 1946, he was re-elected as the chairman of the Liverpool Power and Lighting Committee.

== Personal life ==
Critchley was born in Ormskirk, Lancashire, on 17 December 1893 to William Edwin Critchley. He was educated at the University of Liverpool and in 1925 he married Lucy Lindsay. He died 4 September 1974 aged 80.

Parliament of the United Kingdom
Preceded by Sir Hugo Rutherford, Bt	Member of Parliament for Liverpool Edge Hill; 1935–1945	Succeeded by Richard Clitherow
