= Prudence Hero Napier =

British primatologist (1916–1997)

- Born: 15 March 1916; Liverpool, England
- Died: 6 June 1997 (aged 81)
- Known for: Important contributions to primatology
- Spouse: John Napier
- Children: 2
- Father: Sir Hugo Rutherford
- Scientific career
- Fields: Primatology; Paleoanthropology
- Institutions: See the text

Prudence Hero Napier (née Rutherford; 15 March 1916 – 6 June 1997) was one of Britain's most eminent primatologists, and the world's leading expert on the taxonomy of primates.

== Biography ==
Known to friends and colleagues as Prue, she was born in Liverpool on 15 March 1916, to Sir Hugo Rutherford, a politician and Member of Parliament for North Liverpool.

In 1936, she married the newly graduated surgeon John Napier, who had acquired a particular interest in the anatomy of the human hand. During the 1950s he became convinced that human functional anatomy could not be properly understood without in-depth knowledge of non-human primates and, with Prue's help, he founded the Unit of Primatology in the Royal Free Hospital School of Medicine, which, at that time, was the first centre in Great Britain devoted to the study of non-human primates.

Prudence became her husband's colleague and co-author. She contributed to A Handbook of Living Primates (New York: Academic Press, 1967). Her work led her to an increasing interest in taxonomy. To learn more, in 1971, she joined the staff at the British Museum (Natural History) on a part-time basis and began her own research for a Catalogue of Primates in the British Museum, which eventually ran to a series of three volumes and "incorporate specimens in other British collections as well as the Museum, went from being simple catalogues to becoming increasingly detailed and revisionary, incorporating cautious but insightful changes and commentaries on primate taxonomy. From being an interested amateur, having no formal training, Prue Napier came to be revered and consulted by zoologists all over the world.

She was the foremost contributor to children's books on non-human primates during the 1960s and 1970s.

== Private life ==
Prue and John Napier's marriage produced two sons: Hugo Napier, an actor in the United States, and Graeme Napier, a safari guide in Kenya. In 1982, the Napiers retired to the Isle of Mull in Scotland's Inner Hebrides.

Although they were retired, John and Prue continued their research and in 1985 the couple published one last book titled, The Natural History of the Primates. John Napier died in 1987.

== Selected bibliography ==
In 1970 Prue published her first book, which was aimed for children and young adults, titled Monkeys and Apes. It was translated into German by Gerhard Rietschel using the title Affen und Menschenaffen by Delphin Verlag.

- 1967: A Handbook of Living Primates (New York: Academic Press, with John Russell Napier)
- 1970: Old World Monkeys: Evolution, Systematics, and Behavior (New York: Academic Press, with John Russell Napier)
- 1974: Chimpanzees (London: Bodley Head)
- 1977: Lemurs, Lorises, and Bushbabies (London: Bodley Head, with Colin Threadgall)
- 1988: The Natural History of the Primates (Cambridge: MIT Press, with John Russell Napier)
