= Hugo Rutherford =

British politician (1887–1942)

Sir John Hugo Rutherford, 2nd Baronet (31 October 1887 – 28 December 1942) was a Conservative party politician in the United Kingdom. He was Member of Parliament (MP) for Liverpool Edge Hill from 1931 to 1935. He succeeded his father, Sir William Rutherford, as baronet in 1927.

Rutherford was the father of Prudence Hero Napier, the primatologist.

Parliament of the United Kingdom
Preceded by John Henry Hayes	Member of Parliament for Liverpool Edge Hill; 1931–1935	Succeeded by Alexander Critchley
Baronetage of the United Kingdom
Preceded by Wiliam Watson Rutherford	Baronet (of Liverpool); 1927–1942	Extinct
