= Luke de Pulford =

British human rights activist

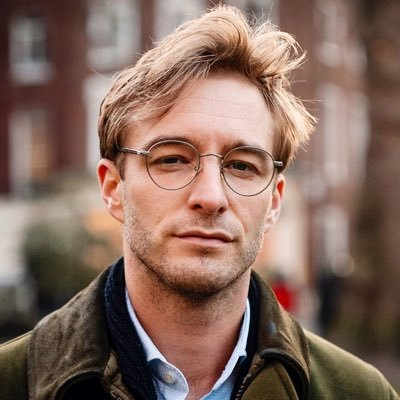
- Luke de Pulford in 2022
- Born: 18 August 1984 (age 41); Canterbury, England
- Occupation: Human rights activist
- Political party: Conservative Party

Chinese name
- Chinese: 裴倫德
Transcriptions
Yue: Cantonese
- Yale Romanization: Pùih Lèuhn Dāk
- Jyutping: Pui^{4} Leon^{4} Dak^{1}

Luke John de Pulford (born 18 August 1984) is a human rights campaigner, particularly in the areas of modern slavery and human rights abuses in China. In 2015, de Pulford co-founded Arise, which he led until 2022. He is the founder and Executive Director of the Inter-Parliamentary Alliance on China, which he co-founded with leading legislators from eight legislatures in 2020. De Pulford is also co-founder of the Coalition for Genocide Response, sits as a Commissioner on the Conservative Party Human Rights Commission, advises the World Uyghur Congress, and is the trustee of several charities.

== Activism ==
Whilst de Pulford has become known for his role in the Hong Kong democracy campaign, such as confronting the pro-establishment Hong Kong politician Junius Ho, his human rights campaigns have covered several areas.

=== Modern slavery ===
In 2015, John Studzinski joined de Pulford to create Arise, an anti-slavery charity based in London and New York and working in high-risk areas of India, Albania, the Philippines and Nigeria. The group works with governments, including the UK and Taiwan, along with global bodies, such as the United Nations, to confront human trafficking and modern slavery. De Pulford works with politicians, frontline anti-slavery groups, Catholic sisters and community leaders to prevent slavery and ensure long term support for victims.

In 2022, de Pulford was instrumental in the campaign to outlaw forced labour from NHS supply chains.

=== Minorities in the Middle East ===
In 2016, de Pulford ran a campaign which resulted in the first ever Parliamentary declaration of genocide in the UK Parliament regarding the treatment of Yazidis, Christians and other minorities, particularly in Iraq and Syria, a move which, according to The Guardian is "almost unprecedented."

=== Human and democratic rights in China ===
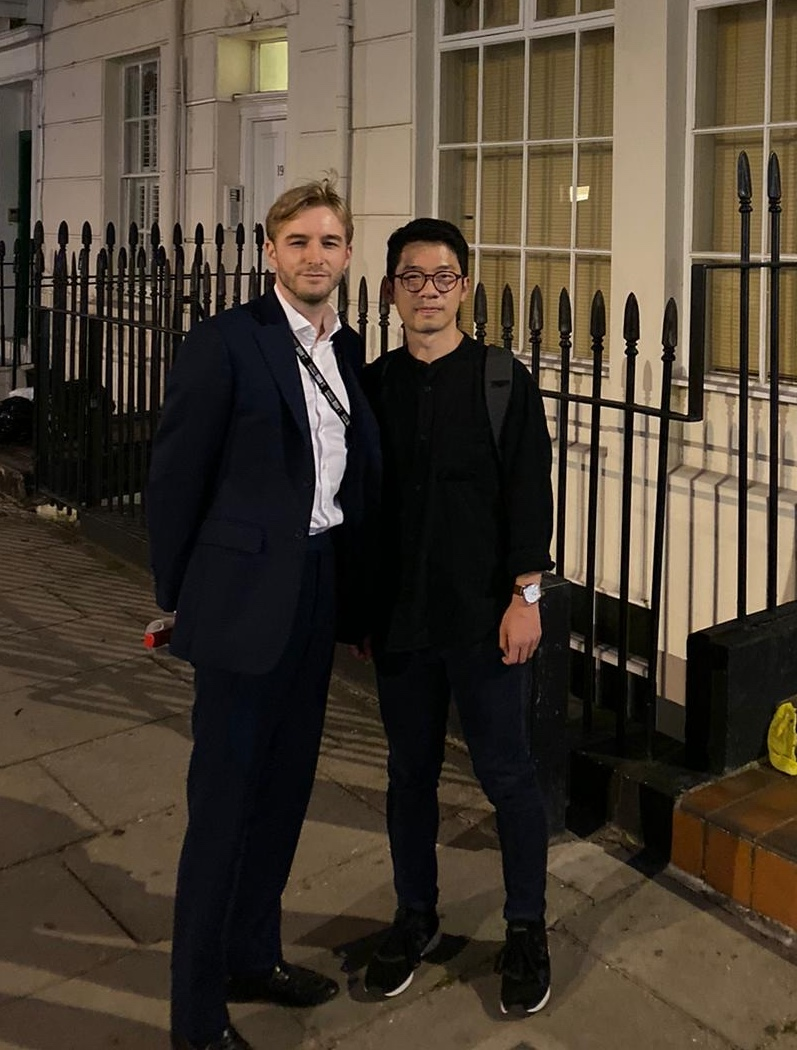
Luke de Pulford with Hong Kong democracy leader Nathan Law in London, July 2020

Since 2019, de Pulford has emerged as an adviser to democracy activists in Hong Kong and to British MPs who are critical of the CCP. This has been noticed by Chinese leadership and, along with Mike Pompeo and Tsai Ing-Wen, de Pulford was one of seven people cited by the Hong Kong authorities as evidence democracy campaigner Jimmy Lai was colluding with foreign forces.

As a result of his Hong Kong pro-democracy campaigning, officials in the Foreign Office have warned de Pulford (along with other campaigners, including Bill Browder and other British MPs) of the risk of extradition when travelling. The warning followed de Pulford's name appearing in court documents relating to the arrest of Andy Li. Since his arrest, IPAC have campaigned for Li's release, with de Pulford arguing that the arrest was part of China's attempt to make an example of activists.

He formed the Coalition for Genocide response in the Houses of Parliament with Lord Alton and Gregory Stanton to maintain pressure on the Johnson government to prevent and punish mass atrocities against ethnic and religious groups. The coalition served at the vehicle for the "Genocide Amendment" which he drafted with Lord Alton in 2020, running the campaign to attach it to the 2020 Trade Bill in both the House of Lords and House of Commons. The reform would give UK judges the ability to rule whether there is evidence of genocide in another nation, thence negating a trade agreement. This passed the House of Lords by a majority of 126 votes on 7 December 2020 and was narrowly defeated in the House of Commons on 19 January 2021. He was made a fellow of Hong Kong Watch in February 2020. De Pulford began a campaign in 2020 with Nathan Law to prosecute British officers serving with the Hong Kong Police Force found to have committed acts of torture during the 2019–20 Hong Kong protests.

=== Launch of IPAC ===
In early 2020, de Pulford established the Inter-Parliamentary Alliance on China, described variously as a "nuisance alliance" by official news organisations of China and as a coalition "for fundamental liberties and the integrity of the international order." The alliance is substantially transatlantic with support from conservative and progressive lawmakers concerned, not only with mistreatment of Uyghur minorities, but also with China's influence on democracies around the world. By 2021 he was known to be the executive director of the organisation, which held its first global summit in Rome, followed by a 2022 meeting in Washington. With that platform, de Pulford has continued to pressure institutions who appear to be in the thrall of China, including the BBC.

== Personal ==
De Pulford currently lives in London. In 2020 he was awarded the Bene Merenti medal by Pope Francis for his contribution to the anti-slavery movement.
