= Robert Suettinger =

American intelligence officer

National Intelligence Officer for East Asia at the National Intelligence Council
- In office 1997–1998
- President: Bill Clinton (1993–2001)
- Vice President: Al Gore (1993–2001)

Personal details
- Education: Lawrence University, Columbia University
- Occupation: Senior Advisor at The Stimson Center

Chinese name
- Traditional Chinese: 蘇葆立
- Simplified Chinese: 苏葆立
Transcriptions
Standard Mandarin
- Hanyu Pinyin: Sū Bǎolì
- Wade–Giles: Su^{1} Pao^{3}-li^{4}

Robert L. Suettinger is an American international relations scholar currently serving as a senior advisor at The Stimson Center and an advisor to the Inter-Parliamentary Alliance on China (IPAC). He was national intelligence officer for East Asia at the National Intelligence Council (NIC) from 1997 to 1998 during the Clinton administration. While there, he oversaw the preparation of national intelligence estimates for the director of the Central Intelligence Agency. His areas of specialty are the People's Republic of China and the North Korean nuclear weapons program.

== Education ==
Suettinger holds a BA from Lawrence University and a MA in comparative politics from Columbia University.

== Career ==
Suettinger served as Director for Asian Affairs on the National Security Council from March 1994 to October 1997, where he assisted National Security Advisers Anthony Lake and Sandy Berger in the development and implementation of U.S. policy toward the Asia-Pacific region.

He also served as deputy national intelligence officer for East Asia at the NIC from 1989 to 1994, and from 1987 to 1989 was President George H. W. Bush's director of the office of analysis for East Asia and the Pacific at the U.S. Department of State's Bureau of Intelligence and Research.

After working in the Clinton administration, Suettinger joined the Brookings Institution as a senior analyst.

== Publications ==
=== Books ===
- Beyond Tiananmen – The Politics of U.S.-China Relations, 1989-2000 (Brookings Institution Press, 2003).
- The Conscience of the Party: Hu Yaobang, China's Communist Reformer (Harvard University Press, 2024).

=== Reports ===
- “American ‘Management’ of Taiwan Strait ‘Crises:’ 1954, 1958 and 1996” in Michael D. Swaine, ed., Managing Sino-American Crises: Case Studies and Analysis, Carnegie Endowment for International Peace, October 2006
- “Tough Engagement: U.S.-China Relations” in Richard Haass and Meghan O’Sullivan, editors, Honey and Vinegar: Incentives, Sanctions and Foreign Policy, Brookings Institution, 2000

=== Articles ===
- Leadership Policy toward Taiwan and the United States in the Wake of Chen Shui-bian's Reelection, Hoover Institution, July 30, 2004
