= 1923 Liverpool Edge Hill by-election =

UK Parliamentary by-election

← 1922	6 March 1923	1923 →

Candidate	Hayes	Hills
Party	Labour	Unionist
Popular vote	10,300	9,250
Percentage	52.7%	47.3%
MP before election
Rutherford
Unionist
Subsequent MP
Hayes
Labour

The 1923 Liverpool Edge Hill by-election was held on 6 March 1923. The by-election was held due to the resignation of the incumbent Conservative MP, William Rutherford. It was won by the Labour candidate Jack Hayes.

== Previous result ==
1922 general election: Liverpool Edge Hill
Party	Candidate	Votes	%	±%
Unionist	William Rutherford	14,186	59.8	−4.0
Labour	Jack Hayes	9,520	40.2	+4.0
Majority		4,666	19.6	−8.0
Turnout		23,706	70.5	+20.2
Unionist hold		Swing	-4.0	

== Result ==
Liverpool Edge Hill by-election, 1923
Party	Candidate	Votes	%	±%
Labour	Jack Hayes	10,300	52.7	+12.5
Unionist	John Waller Hills	9,250	47.3	−12.5
Majority		1,050	5.4	N/A
Turnout		19,550	58.1	−12.4
Labour gain from Unionist		Swing	+12.5	
