= Arthur Irvine =

British barrister and politician (1909–1978)

Sir Arthur James Irvine, QC PC (14 July 1909 – 15 December 1978) was a British barrister and politician. He was the Labour MP for Liverpool Edge Hill from the 1947 by-election until he died aged 69.

Irvine was educated at Edinburgh Academy and Oriel College, Oxford, where he was president of the Oxford Union in the Hilary Term 1932. He became a barrister in 1935, when he was called by Middle Temple, and became secretary to the Lord Chief Justice 1935–40. He became Queen's Counsel in 1958 and recorder of Colchester in 1965. In 1937, Irvine stood as a Liberal candidate at Bethnal Green North East in the London County Council elections.

In his first two unsuccessful parliamentary contests in Kincardine and Western Aberdeenshire in 1935 and 1939, Irvine was a Liberal Party candidate, but later joined the Labour Party. After two further election defeats in Twickenham in 1945 and Aberdeen South in 1946, he was eventually elected Member of Parliament (MP) for Liverpool Edge Hill at the 1947 by-election. He was deselected by his local party, after several earlier attempts, in 1977. Irvine had been criticised for many years for spending only one night per month in his constituency, preferring to spend his time on his law practice in London.

Irvine became Solicitor General for England and Wales in 1967, when he was knighted and served till 1970. He became a privy councillor in the New Years Honours 1970.

His son Michael Irvine served as Conservative MP for Ipswich between 1987 and 1992.

Parliament of the United Kingdom
Preceded by Richard Clitherow	Member of Parliament for Liverpool Edge Hill; 1947–1978	Succeeded by David Alton
Legal offices
Preceded by Dingle Foot	Solicitor General for England and Wales; 1967–1970	Succeeded by Geoffrey Howe
