= 1947 Liverpool Edge Hill by-election =

UK Parliamentary by-election

The 1947 Liverpool Edge Hill by-election was a parliamentary by-election held in England to elect a new Member of Parliament (MP) for the British House of Commons constituency of Liverpool Edge Hill on 11 September 1947. The seat became vacant on the death of the constituency's Labour Member of Parliament (MP) Richard Clitherow.

The result was a hold for the Labour Party.

== Result ==
Liverpool Edge Hill by-election, 1947
Party	Candidate	Votes	%	±%
Labour	Arthur Irvine	10,827	52.1	−12.8
Conservative	Reginald Bevins	8,874	42.6	+7.5
Liberal	Hubert Winthrop Young	910	4.4	New
Ind. Labour Party	David Gibson	154	0.7	New
Independent	C. Foster	48	0.2	New
Majority		1,953	9.5	−20.3
Turnout		20,813	62.7	−3.4
Labour hold		Swing	−10.2	

== See also ==
- Liverpool Edge Hill (UK Parliament constituency)
- 1979 Liverpool Edge Hill by-election
- List of United Kingdom by-elections
- List of parliamentary constituencies in Merseyside
