= David Alton =

British politician (born 1951)

The Right Honourable The Lord Alton of Liverpool KCSG KCMCO
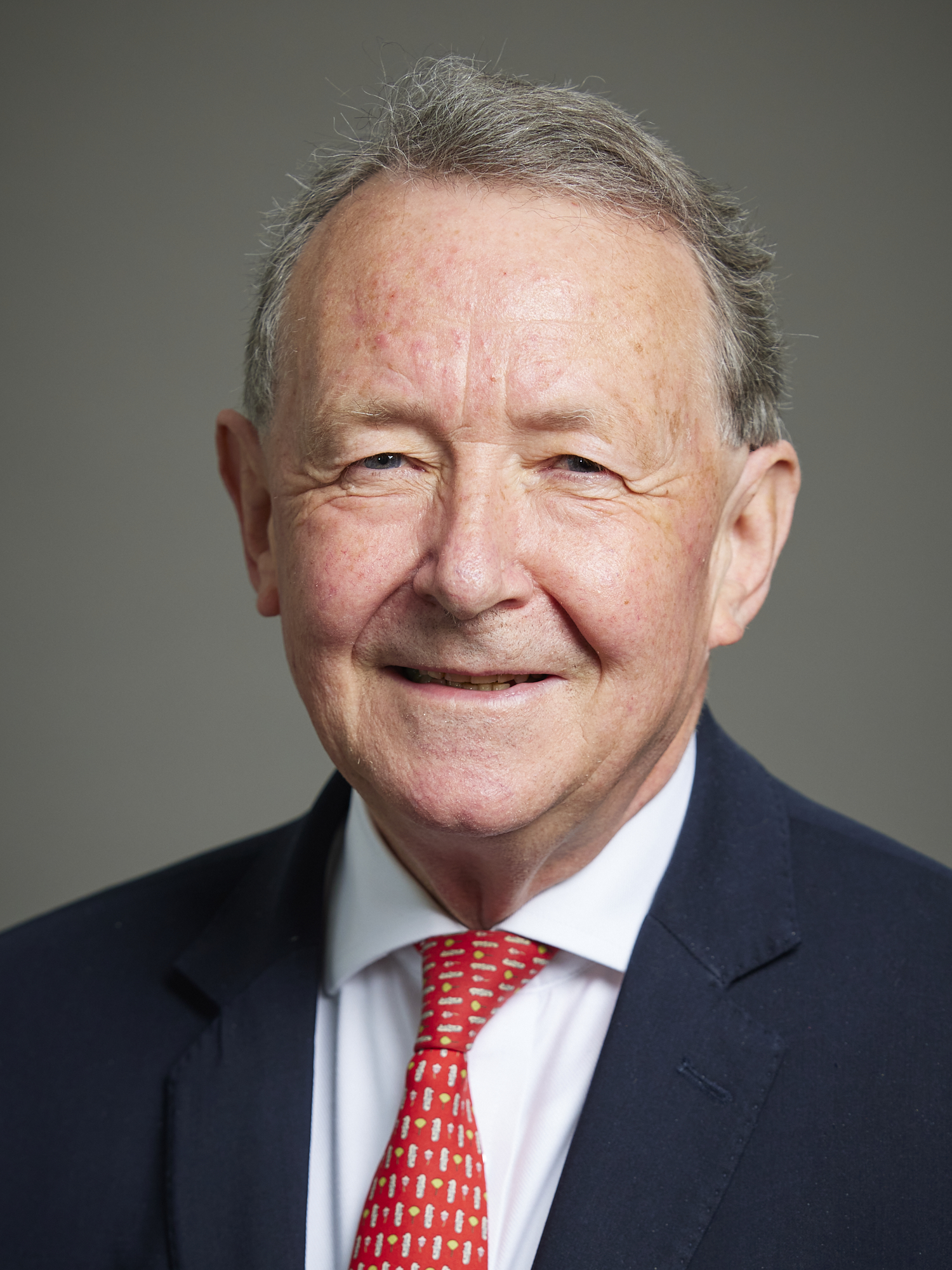
- Official portrait, 2023

Chair of the Joint Committee on Human Rights
- Incumbent
- Assumed office 4 December 2024
- Preceded by: Joanna Cherry

Liberal Chief Whip
- In office 1985 – 11 June 1987
- Leader: David Steel
- Preceded by: Alan Beith
- Succeeded by: Jim Wallace

Member of the House of Lords
- Lord Temporal
- Life peerage 12 June 1997

Member of Parliament; for Liverpool Mossley Hill; Liverpool Edge Hill (1979–1983)
- In office 29 March 1979 – 8 April 1997
- Preceded by: Sir Arthur Irvine
- Succeeded by: Constituency abolished

Personal details
- Born: David Patrick Paul Alton; 15 March 1951 (age 75) London, England
- Party: None (Crossbench)
- Other political affiliations: Liberal (1972–1988); Liberal Democrat (1988–1997)
- Spouse: Elizabeth Bell
- Children: 4
- Education: Liverpool Hope University

David Patrick Paul Alton, Baron Alton of Liverpool, KCSG, KCMCO (born 15 March 1951) is a British-Irish politician, formerly a Member of Parliament for the Liberal Party and later Liberal Democrat who has sat as a crossbench member of the House of Lords since 1997 when he was made a life peer. Alton is also known for his human rights work including the co-founding of Jubilee Action, the children's charity (which changed its name to Chance for Childhood in 2014), and serves as chair, patron or trustee of several charities and voluntary organisations.

In December 2024 Alton was elected Chair of the UK Parliament Joint Committee on Human Rights.

Alton is a visiting professor of Liverpool Hope University, an Ambassador Fellow of Liverpool John Moores University, and a former President of the Catholic Union of Great Britain.

== Education and entry into politics ==
Born in London on 15 March 1951, His father was a Desert Rat who had served in the Eighth Army, and then worked for the Ford Motor Company. His mother was a native Irish speaker from the West of Ireland. After being rehoused from the East End, Alton was brought up in a council flat on an overspill council estate. He passed a scholarship exam to join the first intake of a new Jesuit grammar school and was educated at The Campion School and Christ's College of Education, Liverpool. He began his career as a teacher and, in 1972, was elected as a Liberal to Liverpool City Council as Britain's youngest city councillor. Alton was elected for the Low Hill ward, serving from 1972 to 1974, then, after the Local Government Act 1974, he was elected for the Smithdown ward where he served for the next six years. Alton was also a member of Merseyside County Council for the Smithdown division from 1974 to 1977 and chairman of the housing committee. He was deputy leader of Liverpool City Council from 1978 to 1980.

== Political career ==
Alton was elected as Member of Parliament for Liverpool Edge Hill at a by-election in 1979 for the Liberal Party, when he became the "Baby of the House", achieving a record swing of 36.8% and 64% of the vote. He won the seat the day after the Callaghan Government was defeated in a vote of confidence and the 1979 General Election being called. He became the shortest lived MP, a member for less than a week, and made his Maiden Speech within three hours of taking his seat. Five weeks later he was re-elected and went on to serve as a Liverpool MP for 18 years, before standing down. He was the only new member of a Parliamentary Party of 11 MPs. He campaigned on the slogan "Everyone Knows Someone Who Has Been Helped by David Alton." He was notably a very short-serving Baby of the House, as Stephen Dorrell, who was a year younger than Alton, was elected at the 1979 election.

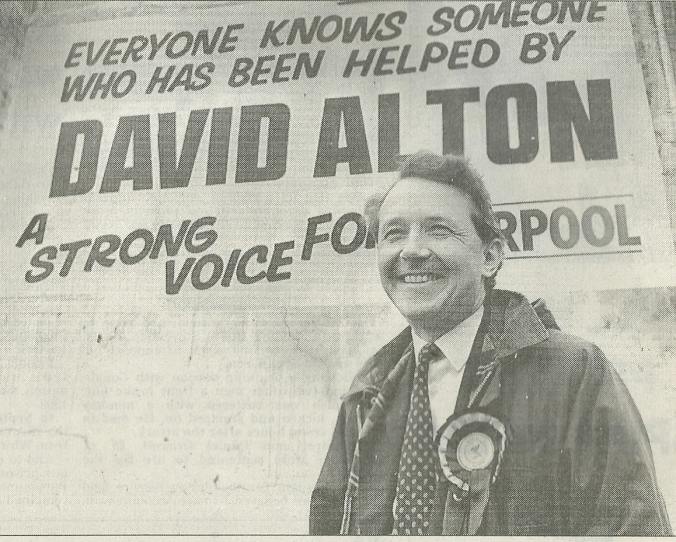
David Alton and his 1979 by-election campaign poster

When the Edge Hill constituency was abolished for the 1983 general election, he was elected to represent the new Liverpool Mossley Hill constituency.

Alton held a number of spokesman posts for the Liberals: environment and race relations, 1979-1981; Home Affairs, 1981-1982; Northern Ireland, 1987-1988. He also served as Chief Whip from 1985 to 1987. He is known for his anti-abortion position, and in 1987 he resigned as Chief Whip to campaign for his unsuccessful private member's bill which aimed to stop late abortions. He became a Liberal Democrat MP when the Liberal Party merged with the SDP in 1988, but he had difficult relations with parts of the party, especially over attempts to make the party adopt a position in favour of abortion rights. In 1992, he announced that he would not stand again as a Liberal Democrat after the party passed a policy that he believed committed the party to support abortion for the first time. A motion passed in Spring 1993 stating that the party had no position on the substantive issue of abortion spared him delivering on the promise.

He stood down as an MP at the 1997 general election. His constituency seat was also abolished at that election.

=== House of Lords ===
In April 1997, it was announced that he was to be made a life peer, as part of John Major's 1997 Dissolution Honours. He was created as Baron Alton of Liverpool, of Mossley Hill in the County of Merseyside on 12 June 1997. He took his seat in the House of Lords as a crossbencher on 12 June 1997.

Alton is chairman of the British-DPRK All-Party Parliamentary Group, and visited Pyongyang in October 2010 when he had talks with leaders of the North Korean government including Choe Thae-bok, the chairman of the Supreme People's Assembly.

=== International sanctions ===
On 26 March 2021, it was announced that Alton was one of two members of the House of Lords to be sanctioned by China for spreading what it called "lies and disinformation" about the country. He was subsequently banned from entering China, Hong Kong and Macau, and Chinese citizens and institutions are prohibited from doing business with him. The sanctions were condemned by the Prime Minister and led the Foreign Secretary to summon the Chinese ambassador. The sanctions were lifted on 30 January 2026 during a visit by Prime Minister Keir Starmer to China.

On the 12 December 2022, Alton was sanctioned by Iran, along with the Chief of the Defence Staff, a Government Minister, Members of Parliament, as well as other individuals and institutions from the UK. It is understood that this was done because of Alton's criticism of Iran's Human Rights record.

Alton was formally denounced by the North Korean regime and told he would be listed as an enemy of their State because of his collaboration with the UN Commission of Inquiry into North Korea which found evidence of crimes against humanity and for providing support to escapees.

Alton was included amongst 21 UK Parliamentarians in the Russian Foreign Ministry's personal sanction list issued on 23 April 2025.

== Parliamentary Appointments ==
Alton served on:

- House of Lords International Relations and Defence Select Committee from 2019 - 2023.
- Joint House of Lords and House of Commons Committee on Human Rights 2023- (and as chair December 2024- ).

== Professor of Citizenship ==
In 1997, Alton was appointed Professor of Citizenship at Liverpool John Moores University, establishing the Foundation for Citizenship and the Roscoe Lectures. The lecture series explores citizenship and lectures have been given by commentators including the 14th Dalai Lama and Prince Charles.

== Human rights ==
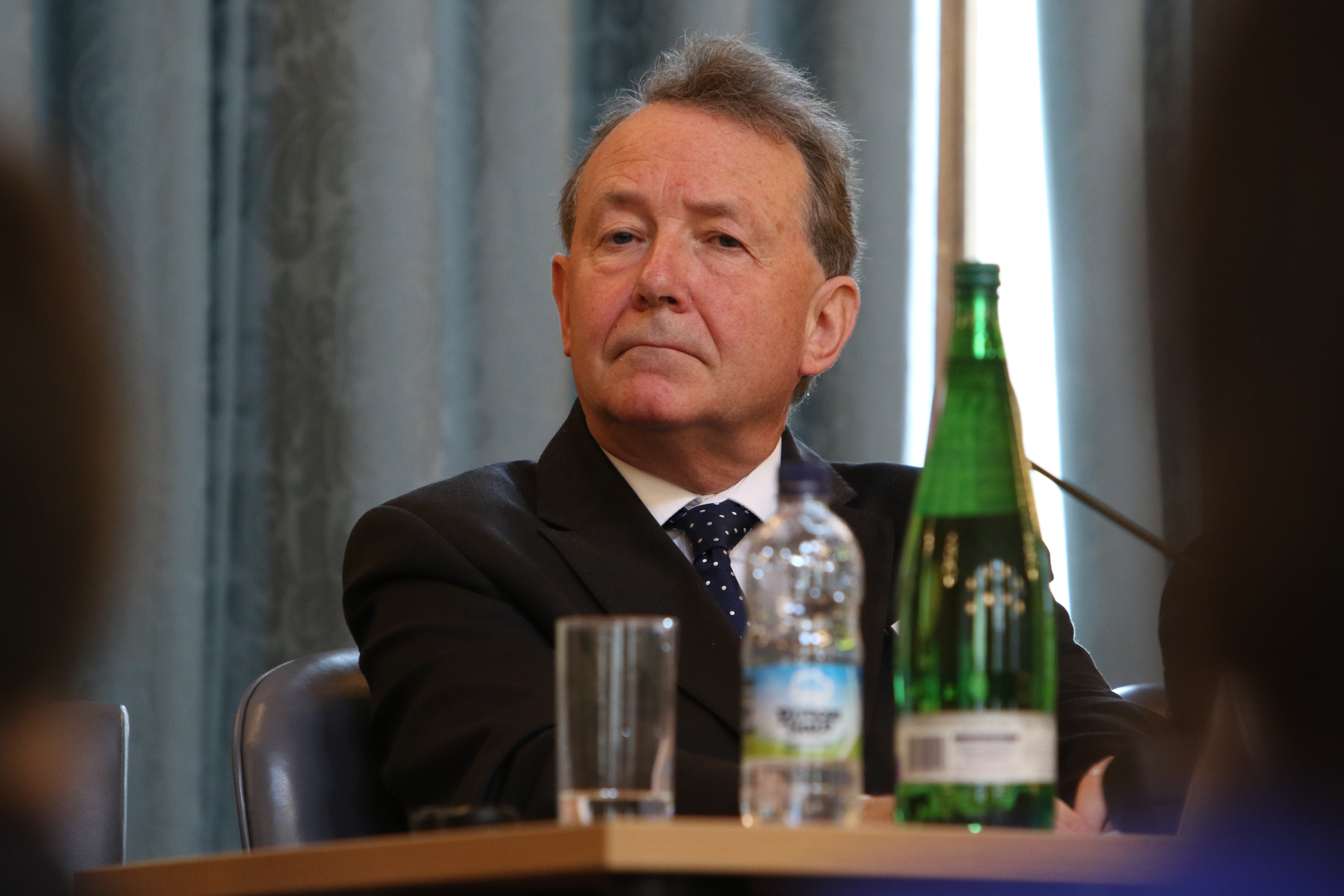
Alton speaks at a summit on freedom of religion held at the Foreign & Commonwealth Office in London on 19 October 2016.

Alton established the lobby group for human rights, Jubilee Campaign, in 1987, with the support of other members of parliament. He also co-founded Jubilee Action, a children's charity established to fulfil the humanitarian needs highlighted by the work of Jubilee Campaign. In 2014 Jubilee Action changed its name to Chance for Childhood.

Alton campaigned against the Human Fertilisation and Embryology Act 2008, opposing the creation and use of animal-human hybrid stem cells for medical purposes.

He is a patron of the International Young Leaders Network and Save the Congo!, a small international rights group founded by the Congolese rights activist Vava Tampa to end the political crisis that continues to give rise to wars, conflicts and violence that have killed over 5.4 million people in Congo.

=== Support for Hong Kong ===
Alton has supported the rights and freedoms of those in Hong Kong, during the 2019–20 Hong Kong protests and regarding the National Security Law imposed by Beijing in June 2020, and its associated clampdowns. In reaction to pro-Beijing lawmaker Junius Ho's actions regarding women and the LGBT+ community, as well as Ho's alleged support of the Yuen Long attackers, Alton worked with Luke de Pulford to pressure Anglia Ruskin University into rescinding the honorary doctoral degree it had conferred on Ho. The degree was withdrawn on 29 October 2019.

During the 2019 Hong Kong Polytechnic University conflict, he issued a statement calling for the end to police violence and criticising Chief Executive Carrie Lam.

=== Trade Bill amendment ===
In January 2021, Alton influenced the Lords to pass an amendment to the Trade Act 2021 that "would require that the UK does not trade with genocidal regimes. Importantly, with the United Nations having shown itself incapable of making such decisions, the determination of whether genocide has taken place would be made by the High Court of England and Wales."

== Personal life ==
Alton is married to Elizabeth Bell, they have four children and five grandchildren. Alton holds both British and Irish citizenship, as do his children. He resides in Lancashire and is a Roman Catholic.

== Honours ==
Alton has been appointed a Knight Commander of Merit of the Sacred Military Constantinian Order of Saint George in 2003. He was appointed a Knight Commander of the Order of St. Gregory the Great by Pope Benedict XVI in 2008.

Alton received the 2023 Notre Dame Prize for Religious Liberty. At the presentation the Dean said "He has dedicated his life to fighting oppression and made this noble cause the cornerstone for his work as a politician and public intellectual.”

== Coat of Arms ==
Alton was granted arms in 1997.

Coat of arms of David Alton
Crest An ankh Gules pendant from the crossbar two bells Or. Escutcheon Gules a dove descending Argent a bordure engrailed of twelve points terminating alternately in trefoils and Maltese crosses. Supporters On either side a Liverbird wings elevated and addorsed Gules legged and in the beak Or a lily Argent slipped and leaved Or. Motto Choose Life

== Books ==
Lord Alton has published numerous non-fiction titles:

- What Kind of Country? Marshall Pickering 1987
- Whose choice anyway? Marshal Pickering 1988
- Faith in Britain Hodder & Stoughton 1991
- Signs of Contradiction Hodder & Stoughton 1996
- Life After Death Christian Democrat Press 1997
- Citizen Virtues HarperCollins 1999
- Citizen 21 HarperCollins 2001
- Pilgrim Ways St Pauls Publishing 2001
- Passion and Pain (with Michele Lombardo) and accompanying DVD of TV series 2003
- Euthanasia: Getting To The Heart of The Matter (with Martin Foley) 2005
- Abortion: Getting To The Heart of The Matter (with Martin Foley) 2005
- Building Bridges: Is there Hope for North Korea? (with Rob Chidley) Lion 2013
- State Responses to Crimes of Genocide: What Went Wrong and How to Change It (with Dr Ewelina Ochab) Palgrave Macmillan 2022.

Parliament of the United Kingdom
Preceded by Sir Arthur Irvine	Member of Parliament for Liverpool Edge Hill; 1979–1983	Constituency abolished
New constituency	Member of Parliament for Liverpool Mossley Hill; 1983–1997	Constituency abolished
Preceded by Andrew MacKay	Baby of the House; 1979	Succeeded by Stephen Dorrell
Party political offices
Preceded by Alan Beith	Liberal Chief Whip; 1985–1987	Succeeded by Jim Wallace
Orders of precedence in the United Kingdom
Preceded by The Lord Steel of Aikwood	Gentlemen; Baron Alton of Liverpool	Followed by The Lord Hurd of Westwell
