= Samuel Higginbottom =

Politician

Samuel Wasse Higginbottom (1853 – 28 December 1902) was Conservative Member of Parliament for Liverpool West Derby. He was a shipowner and a land and colliery owner.

== Biography ==
Higginbottom was born in 1853, the son of T. R. Higginbottom, of Dukinfield, Cheshire. Early in life, after a short experience at the Lawn Vale Colliery, Skelmersdale, he entered upon a commercial career in Liverpool. He purchased several collieries in Lancashire, Cheshire and North Wales, and became one of the largest private colliery owners in the north of England. His investments were profitable, and he re-invested in shipping as one of the founders the Douglas Steamers Ltd, a company formed to run steamers between Liverpool and the Isle of Man.

He was a member of Liverpool City Council for Edge Hill ward, and served on several committees in the council. He was an active member of the Wesleyan Methodist Church.

Higginbottom won the parliamentary seat without opposition in 1900, but died only two years later.

He married in 1877 a daughter of Mr. Henry Shanock, of Scarisbrick, Southport.

Higginbottom died at Claughton, Cheshire on 28 December 1902, after a brief illness.

== Sources ==
- Leigh's list of MPs
- Craig, F. W. S., ed. (1974). British Parliamentary Election Results: 1885-1918. London: Macmillan Press. ISBN 9781349022984.
- Whitaker's Almanack, 1901 to 1906 editions
