= Liverpool Edge Hill =

Parliamentary constituency in the United Kingdom, 1918–1983

- Former borough constituency for the House of Commons
- Liverpool Edge Hill in Lancashire, showing boundaries used from 1974-1983

1918–1983
- Seats: One
- Created from: Liverpool Abercromby
- Replaced by: Liverpool Mossley Hill and Liverpool Broadgreen

Liverpool Edge Hill was a borough constituency within the city and metropolitan borough of Liverpool, in the English county of Merseyside, centred on Edge Hill. It returned one Member of Parliament (MP) to the House of Commons of the Parliament of the United Kingdom, elected by the first-past-the-post voting system.

The constituency was created in 1918 and abolished in 1983.

== History ==
There were two by-elections in Liverpool Edge Hill, following the deaths of its incumbent Members of Parliament. At the 1947 by-election, Labour held the seat with a reduced majority, but the 1979 by-election saw a large swing against Labour who lost the seat to the Liberal David Alton — a defeat which foreshadowed Labour's national loss in the 1979 general election.

When the constituency disappeared for the 1983 general election, 59.85% of its territory was transferred to the new constituency of Liverpool Mossley Hill, where David Alton was re-elected. The remaining 40.15% of the seat fell into Liverpool Broadgreen, which was won by the Labour left-winger Terry Fields.

Michael Howard, later leader of the Conservative Party, was twice a candidate in the constituency, in the general elections of 1966 and 1970.

== Boundaries ==
1918–1950: The County Borough of Liverpool wards of Edge Hill and Low Hill, and part of Kensington ward.

1950–1955: The County Borough of Liverpool wards of Edge Hill, Fairfield, Kensington, and High Hill.

1955–1974: The County Borough of Liverpool wards of Fairfield, Kensington, Picton, and Smithdown.

1974–1983: The County Borough of Liverpool wards of Fairfield, Kensington, Low Hill, Picton, and Smithdown.

== Members of Parliament ==
Election	Member	Party
1918	William Watson Rutherford	Conservative
1923 by-election	John Henry Hayes	Labour
1931	Sir Hugo Rutherford, Bt	Conservative
1935	Alexander Critchley	Conservative
1945	Richard Clitherow	Labour
1947 by-election	Arthur Irvine	Labour
1979 by-election	David Alton	Liberal
1983	constituency abolished	

== Election results ==
=== Election in the 1910s ===
1918 general election: Liverpool Edge Hill
Party		Candidate	Votes	%	±%
C	Unionist	William Rutherford	9,832	63.8	
	Labour	Peter Tevenan	5,587	36.2	
Majority			4,245	27.6	
Turnout			15,419	50.3	
Registered electors			30,683		
	Unionist win (new seat)				
C indicates candidate endorsed by the coalition government.

=== Elections in the 1920s ===
1922 general election: Liverpool Edge Hill
Party	Candidate	Votes	%	±%
Unionist	William Rutherford	14,186	59.8	−4.0
Labour	Jack Hayes	9,520	40.2	+4.0
Majority		4,666	19.6	−8.0
Turnout		23,706	70.5	+20.2
Registered electors		33,634		
Unionist hold		Swing	−4.0	

1923 Liverpool Edge Hill by-election
Party	Candidate	Votes	%	±%
Labour	Jack Hayes	10,300	52.7	+12.5
Unionist	John Waller Hills	9,250	47.3	−12.5
Majority		1,050	5.4	N/A
Turnout		19,550	58.1	−12.4
Registered electors		33,634		
Labour gain from Unionist		Swing	+12.5	

1923 general election: Liverpool Edge Hill
Party	Candidate	Votes	%	±%
Labour	Jack Hayes	13,538	56.9	+16.7
Unionist	Oliver Stanley	10,249	43.1	−16.7
Majority		3,289	13.8	N/A
Turnout		23,787	69.9	−0.6
Registered electors		34,021		
Labour gain from Unionist		Swing	+16.7	

1924 general election: Liverpool Edge Hill
Party	Candidate	Votes	%	±%
Labour	Jack Hayes	14,168	53.0	−3.9
Unionist	D.C. Williams	12,587	47.0	+3.9
Majority		1,581	6.0	−7.8
Turnout		26,755	78.1	+8.2
Registered electors		34,254		
Labour hold		Swing	−3.9	

1929 general election: Liverpool Edge Hill
Party	Candidate	Votes	%	±%
Labour	Jack Hayes	17,650	55.4	+2.4
Unionist	Hugo Rutherford	11,622	36.5	−10.5
Liberal	Arthur Donald Dennis	2,581	8.1	New
Majority		6,028	18.9	+12.9
Turnout		31,853	74.9	−3.2
Registered electors		42,516		
Labour hold		Swing	+6.5	

=== Elections in the 1930s ===
General election 1931: Liverpool Edge Hill
Party	Candidate	Votes	%	±%
Conservative	Hugo Rutherford	19,901	62.8	+26.3
Labour	Jack Hayes	11,772	37.2	―17.8
Majority		8,129	25.6	N/A
Turnout		31,673	74.7	―0.2
Conservative gain from Labour		Swing		

General election 1935: Liverpool Edge Hill
Party	Candidate	Votes	%	±%
Conservative	Alexander Critchley	13,882	50.6	―12.2
Labour	Jack Hayes	13,581	49.5	+12.3
Majority		301	1.1	―24.5
Turnout		27,463	68.1	―6.6
Conservative hold		Swing	―12.2	

=== Elections in the 1940s ===
General election 1945: Liverpool Edge Hill
Party	Candidate	Votes	%	±%
Labour	Richard Clitherow	13,150	64.9	+15.4
Conservative	Wilfrid Clothier	7,111	35.1	―15.5
Majority		6,039	29.8	N/A
Turnout		20,261	66.3	―1.8
Labour gain from Conservative		Swing	―15.5	

By-election 1947: Liverpool Edge Hill
Party	Candidate	Votes	%	±%
Labour	Arthur Irvine	10,827	52.1	―12.8
Conservative	Reginald Bevins	8,874	42.6	+7.5
Liberal	Hubert Winthrop Young	910	4.4	New
Ind. Labour Party	David Gibson	154	0.7	New
Independent	Cyril Foster	48	0.2	New
Majority		1,953	9.5	―20.3
Turnout		20,813	62.7	―3.4
Labour hold		Swing	+10.2	

=== Elections in the 1950s ===
General election 1950: Liverpool Edge Hill
Party	Candidate	Votes	%	±%
Labour	Arthur Irvine	21,834	50.9	―14.0
Conservative	Eric Errington	18,830	43.9	+8.8
Liberal	John Bowen	2,247	5.2	N/A
Majority		3,004	7.0	―22.8
Turnout		42,911	78.3	+12.0
Labour hold		Swing		

General election 1951: Liverpool Edge Hill
Party	Candidate	Votes	%	±%
Labour	Arthur Irvine	22,906	53.9	+3.0
Conservative	Harold Steward	19,569	46.1	+2.2
Majority		3,337	7.8	+0.8
Turnout		42,475	76.4	―1.9
Labour hold		Swing	+0.4	

General election 1955: Liverpool Edge Hill
Party	Candidate	Votes	%	±%
Labour	Arthur Irvine	20,060	51.4	―2.5
Conservative	Harry Sibson Leslie Rigg	18,940	48.6	+2.5
Majority		1,120	2.8	―5.0
Turnout		39,000	68.0	―8.4
Labour hold		Swing	―2.5	

General election 1959: Liverpool Edge Hill
Party	Candidate	Votes	%	±%
Labour	Arthur Irvine	19,725	50.9	―0.5
Conservative	Joseph Norton	19,026	49.1	+0.5
Majority		699	1.8	―1.0
Turnout		38,751	70.7	+2.7
Labour hold		Swing	―0.6	

=== Elections in the 1960s ===
General election 1964: Liverpool Edge Hill
Party	Candidate	Votes	%	±%
Labour	Arthur Irvine	19,221	59.0	+8.1
Conservative	Neil S. Jamieson	13,335	41.0	―8.1
Majority		5,886	18.0	+14.2
Turnout		32,556	65.6	―5.1
Labour hold		Swing	+8.1	

General election 1966: Liverpool Edge Hill
Party	Candidate	Votes	%	±%
Labour	Arthur Irvine	18,203	63.1	+4.1
Conservative	Michael Howard	10,662	36.9	―4.1
Majority		7,541	26.2	+8.2
Turnout		28,865	60.5	―5.1
Labour hold		Swing	+4.1	

=== Elections in the 1970s ===
General election 1970: Liverpool Edge Hill
Party	Candidate	Votes	%	±%
Labour	Arthur Irvine	14,752	57.7	―5.4
Conservative	Michael Howard	10,804	42.3	+5.4
Majority		3,948	15.4	―10.8
Turnout		25,556	58.7	―1.8
Labour hold		Swing	―5.4	

General election February 1974: Liverpool Edge Hill
Party	Candidate	Votes	%	±%
Labour	Arthur Irvine	12,979	47.9	―10.1
Liberal	David Alton	7,229	26.7	New
Conservative	Stephen Nicholas Perry	6,871	25.4	―16.6
Majority		5,557	18.2	+2.8
Turnout		29,079	66.6	+7.9
Labour hold		Swing		

General election October 1974: Liverpool Edge Hill
Party	Candidate	Votes	%	±%
Labour	Arthur Irvine	13,023	51.9	+4.0
Liberal	David Alton	6,852	27.3	+0.6
Conservative	Stephen Nicholas Perry	5,208	20.8	―4.6
Majority		6,171	24.6	+6.4
Turnout		25,083	61.2	―5.4
Labour hold		Swing	+1.7	

By-election 1979: Liverpool Edge Hill
Party	Candidate	Votes	%	±%
Liberal	David Alton	12,945	64.1	+36.8
Labour	Bob Wareing	4,812	23.8	―28.1
Conservative	Charles John Nicholas Ward	1,906	9.4	―11.3
Law and Order	Joan Jonker	337	1.7	New
Socialist Unity	Ann Walker	127	0.6	New
Gay Liberal	Michael Taylor	40	0.2	New
Independent	Bill Boaks	32	0.2	New
Majority		8,133	40.3	N/A
Turnout		20,199	56.6	―4.6
Liberal gain from Labour		Swing	+32.4	

General election 1979: Liverpool Edge Hill
Party	Candidate	Votes	%	±%
Liberal	David Alton	12,701	52.0	+24.7
Labour	Bob Wareing	8,453	34.6	―17.3
Conservative	Charles John Nicholas Ward	3,098	12.7	―8.1
National Front	Howard Hawksley	152	0.6	New
Majority		4,248	17.4	N/A
Turnout		24,404	69.0	+7.8
Liberal gain from Labour		Swing	+21.0	

== See also ==
- 1947 Liverpool Edge Hill by-election
- 1979 Liverpool Edge Hill by-election
