= Liverpool Mossley Hill =

UK Parliament constituency (1983–1997)

Coordinates: 53.383°N 2.909°W

- Former borough constituency for the House of Commons
- County: Merseyside

1983–1997
- Created from: Liverpool Edge Hill, Liverpool Garston, Liverpool Scotland Exchange, Liverpool Toxteth and Liverpool Wavertree
- Replaced by: Liverpool Wavertree, Liverpool Riverside and Liverpool Garston

Liverpool Mossley Hill was a parliamentary constituency centred on the Mossley Hill suburb of Liverpool. It returned one Member of Parliament (MP) to the House of Commons of the Parliament of the United Kingdom, elected by the first-past-the-post voting system.

== History and boundaries ==
The City of Liverpool wards of Aigburth, Church, Grassendale, Picton, and Smithdown.

The constituency was created for the 1983 general election; half of its territory was previously in the abolished constituency of Liverpool Edge Hill.

The constituency returned the same MP throughout its existence: David Alton, who initially represented the Liberals, then from 1988 was a Liberal Democrat, after the Liberals' merger with the Social Democratic Party. Alton had first been elected to parliament at a by-election in March 1979 for Liverpool Edge Hill, and held that seat until its abolition in 1983. For its entire existence, it was the only seat in Liverpool not held by Labour, and since its abolition that party has held all the city's seats.

The constituency was abolished for the 1997 general election; Alton retired from the Commons and was appointed a cross-bench member of the House of Lords, and the Mossley Hill area itself was transferred to the redrawn constituency of Liverpool Riverside, a safe Labour seat.

== Members of Parliament ==
Election	Member	Party
1983	David Alton	Liberal
1988	David Alton	Liberal Democrats
1997	constituency abolished	

== Elections ==
=== Elections in the 1990s ===
General election 1992: Liverpool Mossley Hill
Party	Candidate	Votes	%	±%
Liberal Democrats	David Alton	19,809	47.9	+4.2
Labour	Neville S. Bann	17,203	41.6	+2.8
Conservative	Stephen Syder	4,269	10.3	―7.2
Natural Law	Byron Rigby	114	0.3	New
Majority		2,606	6.3	+1.4
Turnout		41,395	68.5	―6.6
Liberal Democrats hold		Swing	+0.7	

=== Elections in the 1980s ===
General election 1987: Liverpool Mossley Hill
Party	Candidate	Votes	%	±%
Liberal	David Alton	20,012	43.7	+2.8
Labour	Joseph Devaney	17,786	38.8	+12.0
Conservative	Warwick Lightfoot	8,005	17.5	―14.3
Majority		2,226	4.9	―4.2
Turnout		45,803	75.1	+1.7
Liberal hold		Swing	+8.6	

General election 1983: Liverpool Mossley Hill
Party	Candidate	Votes	%	±%
Liberal	David Alton	18,845	40.9	
Conservative	Brian Keefe	14,650	31.8	
Labour	Andrew Snowden	12,352	26.8	
National Front	Mark Erikson-Rohrer	212	0.5	
Majority		4,195	9.1	
Turnout		46,059	73.4	
Liberal win (new seat)				
