= 1921 Liverpool City Council election =

1921 English local government election

- 1 November 1921

37 councillors' seats were up for election

Elections to Liverpool City Council were held on 1 November 1921.

One third of the council seats were up for election. The term of office for each councillor being three years.

Eight of the 37 seats up for election were uncontested.

After the election, the composition of the council was:

Party	Councillors	±	Aldermen	Total
Conservative	57	+4	24	83
Irish Nationalists	20	+3	2	22
Labour	12	-6	2	14
Coalition Liberal	11	+1	3	14
Liberal	5	-3	4	9
Independent	3	0	0	3
Protestant	1	+1	0	1

== Election result ==
Liverpool local election result 1921
Party	Seats	Gains	Losses	Net gain/loss	Seats %	Votes %	Votes	+/−
Conservative	20	1	0	+1	54%	43%	51,639	
Irish Nationalist	6	1	0	+1	16%	7.8%	9,375	
National Liberal	4	1	0	+1	11%	8%	9,607	
Liberal	3	0	0	0	8%	8%	9,582	
Labour	2	0	4	-4	5%	27%	32,927	
Protestant	1	1	0	+1	3%	2.5%	3,008	
Middle Class Union	0	0	0	0	0%	1.8%	2,168	
Communist	0	0	0	0	0%	1.1%	1,274	
Anti-Waste League	0	0	0	0	0%	1.1%	518	
Independent	0	0	0	0	0%	0.24%	283	

== Ward results ==
* - Retiring Councillor seeking re-election

=== Abercromby ===
No. 9 Abercromby
Party	Candidate	Votes	%	±%
Conservative	William Thomas Roberts	unopposed		
Registered electors				
Conservative hold		Swing		

=== Aigburth ===
No. 17 Aigburth
Party	Candidate	Votes	%	±%
Conservative	John Ritchie	1,955	67%	
Middle Class Union	William James Austin	974	33%	
Majority		981		
Registered electors		4,612		
Turnout		2,929	64%	
Conservative hold		Swing		

=== Anfield ===
No. 29 Anfield
Party	Candidate	Votes	%	±%
Liberal	Wilfred Bowring Stoddart *	1,950	41%	
Conservative	Albert Morrow	1,927	41%	
Labour	Mrs. Julia Gertrude Taylor	870	18%	
Majority		23		
Registered electors		9,246		
Turnout		4,747	51%	
Liberal hold		Swing		

=== Breckfield ===
No. 30 Breckfield
Party	Candidate	Votes	%	±%
Conservative	Thomas Henry Burton	3,811	75%	
Labour	William Smith	1,281	25%	
Majority		2,530		
Registered electors		9,624		
Turnout		5,092	53%	
Conservative hold		Swing		

=== Brunswick ===
No. 11 Brunswick
Party	Candidate	Votes	%	±%
Labour	Luke Hogan	2,171	59%	
Conservative	Ernest Edward Jacks	1,503	41%	
Majority		668		
Registered electors		7,576		
Turnout		3,674	48%	
Labour hold		Swing		

=== Castle Street ===
No. 7 Castle Street
Party	Candidate	Votes	%	±%
Liberal	Richard George Hough	unopposed		
Registered electors				
Liberal hold		Swing		

=== Childwall ===
No. 38 Childwall
Party	Candidate	Votes	%	±%
Conservative	Herbert John Davis *	479	69%	
Labour	John Mouat Robertson	214	31%	
Majority		265		
Registered electors		952		
Turnout		693	73%	
Conservative win (new seat)				

=== Dingle ===
No. 12 Dingle
Party	Candidate	Votes	%	±%
Liberal	William Pemberton Coslett	unopposed		
Registered electors				
Liberal hold		Swing		

=== Edge Hill ===
No. 18 Edge Hill
Party	Candidate	Votes	%	±%
Conservative	James Jude	3,364	52%	
Labour	Robert Tissyman	3,055	48%	
Majority		309		
Registered electors		11,652		
Turnout		6,419	55%	
Conservative hold		Swing		

=== Everton ===
No. 21 Everton
Party	Candidate	Votes	%	±%
National Liberal	Thomas Dugdale Stubbs	2,947	54%	
Labour	John Henry Naylor *	2,535	46%	
Majority		412		
Registered electors		11,768		
Turnout		5,482	47%	
National Liberal gain from Labour		Swing		

=== Exchange ===
No. 5 Exchange
Party	Candidate	Votes	%	±%
Irish Nationalist	John Quinn	948	53%	
Liberal	Charles Sydney Jones *	840	47%	
Majority		108	6%	N/A
Registered electors		2,664		
Turnout		1,788	67%	
Irish Nationalist gain from Liberal		Swing		

=== Fairfield ===
No. 31 Fairfield
Party	Candidate	Votes	%	±%
Conservative	Thomas Dowd	2,566	55%	
Liberal	George Edward Travis	2,127	45%	
Majority		439		
Registered electors		9,140		
Turnout		4,693	51%	
Conservative hold		Swing		

=== Fazakerley ===
No. 27 Fazakerley
Party	Candidate	Votes	%	±%
Conservative	George Herbert Charters	901	64%	
Labour	Robert Watson	498	36%	
Majority		403		
Registered electors		2,411		
Turnout		1,399	58%	
Conservative win (new seat)				

=== Garston ===
No. 37 Garston
Party	Candidate	Votes	%	±%
Conservative	George Atkin	2,082	58%	
Labour	William Henry Paulson	1,525	42%	
Majority		557		
Registered electors		5,318		
Turnout		3,607	68%	
Conservative hold		Swing		

=== Granby ===
No. 14 Granby
Party	Candidate	Votes	%	±%
	James Waterworth	unopposed		
Registered electors				
		Swing		

=== Great George ===
No. 10 Great George
Party	Candidate	Votes	%	±%
Irish Nationalist	Thomas Joseph Marner	1,299	57%	
Liberal	William Henry Broad	703	31%	
Independent	George Henry Bennett	283	12%	
Majority		596		
Registered electors		4,006		
Turnout		2,285	57%	
Irish Nationalist hold		Swing		

=== Kensington ===
No. 19 Kensington
Party	Candidate	Votes	%	±%
Conservative	John Gordon	3,512	64%	
Labour	Joseph Mooney	1,955	36%	
Majority		1,557		
Registered electors		10,492		
Turnout		5,467	52%	
Conservative hold		Swing		

=== Kirkdale ===
No. 24 Kirkdale
Party	Candidate	Votes	%	±%
Conservative	John Lucas Rankin	4,577	71%	
Labour	Frederick Jones	1,855	29%	
Majority		2,722		
Registered electors		14,363		
Turnout		6,432	45%	
Conservative hold		Swing		

=== Low Hill ===
No. 20 Low Hill
Party	Candidate	Votes	%	±%
Conservative	Alfred Gaskell Alsop	2,876	57%	
Labour	George Nelson *	2,126	43%	
Majority		750	14%	N/A
Registered electors		9,695		
Turnout		5,002	52%	
Conservative gain from Labour		Swing		

=== Much Woolton ===
No. 36 Much Woolton
Party	Candidate	Votes	%	±%
National Liberal	Robert Gladstone	776	62%	
Labour	Charles Jabez Edwards	475	38%	
Majority		301		
Registered electors		1,600		
Turnout		1,251	78%	
National Liberal hold		Swing		

=== Netherfield ===
No. 22 Netherfield
Party	Candidate	Votes	%	±%
Conservative	Harold Edward Davies *	3,696	86%	
Labour	Vincent Lloyd	598	14%	
Majority		3,098		
Registered electors		10,615		
Turnout		4,294	40%	
Conservative hold		Swing		

=== North Scotland ===
No. 2 North Scotland
Party	Candidate	Votes	%	±%
Irish Nationalist	James Bolger *	3,634	98%	
Liberal	Walter Henry Davies	85	2%	
Majority		3,549		
Registered electors		7,379		
Turnout		3,719	50%	
Irish Nationalist hold		Swing		

=== Old Swan ===
No. 32 Old Swan
Party	Candidate	Votes	%	±%
Conservative	John Edwards *	3,598	69%	
Labour	William John Daniel	1,619	31%	
Majority		1,979		
Registered electors		10,866		
Turnout		5,217	48%	
Conservative hold		Swing		

=== Prince's Park ===
No. 13 Prince's Park
Party	Candidate	Votes	%	±%
Conservative	Miss Margaret Beavan *	Unopposed	N/A	N/A
Registered electors				
Conservative hold				

=== Sandhills ===
No. 1 Sandhills
Party	Candidate	Votes	%	±%
Irish Nationalist	John Cunningham *	2,181	78%	
Liberal	Joseph Edward Freeman	600	22%	
Majority		1,581		
Registered electors		8,603		
Turnout		2,781	32%	
Irish Nationalist hold		Swing		

=== St. Anne's ===
No. 6 St. Anne's
Party	Candidate	Votes	%	±%
Labour	James Sexton *	1,685	57%	
Communist	John Neild	1,274	43%	
Majority		411	14%	
Registered electors		7,013		
Turnout		2,959	42%	
Labour hold		Swing		

=== St. Domingo ===
No. 23 St. Domingo
Party	Candidate	Votes	%	±%
Protestant	Albert Clayton	3,008	70%	
Labour	Charles Wilson *	1,277	30%	
Majority		1,731		
Registered electors		10,431		
Turnout		4,285	41%	
Protestant gain from Labour		Swing		

=== St. Peter's ===
No. 8 St. Peter's
Party	Candidate	Votes	%	±%
Liberal	Burton William Eills	unopposed		
Registered electors				
Liberal hold		Swing		

=== Sefton Park East ===
No. 15 Sefton Park East
Party	Candidate	Votes	%	±%
Conservative	George Edward Holme	2,170	48%	
Liberal	Miss Jessie Jardine Beavan	1,671	37%	
Middle Class Union	William Thomas Oversby	696	15%	
Majority		499		
Registered electors		8,569		
Turnout		4,537	53%	
Conservative hold		Swing		

=== Sefton Park West ===
No. 16 Sefton Park West
Party	Candidate	Votes	%	±%
Conservative	Miss Mabel Fletcher *	1,825	64%	
Anti-Waste League	Mrs. Emma Louisa Scaiff	518	18%	
Middle Class Union	Amys Benjamin Harper	498	18%	
Majority		1,307	46%	
Registered electors		5,809		
Turnout		2,841	49%	
Conservative hold		Swing		

=== South Scotland ===
No. 3 South Scotland
Party	Candidate	Votes	%	±%
Irish Nationalist	Patrick Jeremiah Kelly	unopposed		
Registered electors				
Irish Nationalist hold		Swing		

=== Vauxhall ===
No. 4 Vauxhall
Party	Candidate	Votes	%	±%
Irish Nationalist	Joseph Belger	1,313	92%	
Liberal	Albert Maccabe	115	8%	
Majority		1,198		
Registered electors		3,530		
Turnout		1,428	40%	
Irish Nationalist hold		Swing		

=== Walton ===
No. 25 Walton
Party	Candidate	Votes	%	±%
Conservative	James Conrad Cross	unopposed		
Registered electors				
Conservative hold		Swing		

=== Warbreck ===
No. 26 Warbreck
Party	Candidate	Votes	%	±%
National Liberal	Edward West	3,811	78%	
Labour	John Henry Mawdesley	1,082	22%	
Majority		2,729		
Registered electors		10,746		
Turnout		4,893	46%	
National Liberal hold		Swing		

=== Wavertree ===
No. 34 Wavertree
Party	Candidate	Votes	%	±%
National Liberal	John Morris Griffith	2,073	43%	
Liberal	Hugh Frame	1,491	31%	
Labour	George Henry Boothman	1,265	26%	
Majority		582		
Registered electors		9,600		
Turnout		4,829	50%	
National Liberal hold		Swing		

=== Wavertree West ===
No. 33 Wavertree West
Party	Candidate	Votes	%	±%
Conservative	Sidney Stanley Dawson	2,967	67%	
Labour	Charles Matthew Belk	1,470	33%	
Majority		1,497		
Registered electors		8,213		
Turnout		4,437	54%	
Conservative hold		Swing		

=== West Derby ===
No. 28 West Derby
Party	Candidate	Votes	%	±%
Conservative	William James Bailes *	3,468	72%	
Labour	Charles Henry Taunton	1,327	28%	
Majority		2,141		
Registered electors		9,282		
Turnout		4,795	52%	
Conservative hold		Swing		

== Aldermanic Elections ==
=== Aldermanic Election 7 December 1921 ===
Caused by the death of Alderman George Jeremy Lynskey (Irish Nationalist, last elected as an alderman on 9 November 1920) on 27 October 1921, in whose place Councillor Thomas Burke JP (Irish Nationalist, Vauxhall, last elected as a councillor on 1 November 1919 was elected by the Council as an alderman on 7 December 1921.

Party	Alderman	Ward	Term expires
Conservative	Thomas Burke JP	No. 4 Vauxhall	1926

=== Aldermanic Elections 1 February 1922 ===
Caused by the death of Alderman Edward James Chevalier JP (Conservative, last elected as an alderman on 9 November 1920) on 26 October 1921, in whose place Councillor Robert Lowry Burns (Party?, Princes Park, last elected as a councillor 14 March 1921) was elected by the Council as an alderman on 1 February 1922

Party	Alderman	Ward	Term expires
	Robert Lowry Burns	No. 32 Old Swan	1926

Vacancy caused by the death of Alderman Simon Jude (Conservative, last elected as an alderman on 9 November 1913) on 31 December 1921, in whose place Councillor Robert Charles Herman (Conservative, Warbreck, last elected as a councillor 1 November 1919, Pharmacist of 2 Ullet Road, Liverpool, was elected by the Council as an alderman on 1 February 1922

Party	Alderman	Ward	Term expires
Conservative	Robert Charles Herman	No. 33 Wavertree West	1923

=== Aldermanic Election 26 March 1922 ===
Caused by the death of Alderman Edward Hatton Cookson (Conservative, last elected as an alderman on 9 November 1913) on 26 March 1922.

=== Aldermanic Election 9 May 1922 ===
Caused by the death of Alderman Richard Dart (Conservative, last elected as an alderman on 9 November 1913 ) on 9 May 1922.

== By-elections ==
=== No. 4 Vauxhall 5 January 1922 ===
Caused by the election by the Council as an alderman of Councillor Thomas Burke JP (Irish Nationalist, Vauxhall, last elected as a councillor on 1 November 1919 on 7 December 1921 , following the death of Alderman George Jeremy Lynskey (Irish Nationalist, last elected as an alderman on 9 November 1920 ) on 27 October 1921.

No. 4 Vauxhall 5 January 1922
Party	Candidate	Votes	%	±%
Irish Nationalist	Thomas Arthur Murphy	unopposed		
Registered electors				
Irish Nationalist hold		Swing		

=== No. 13 Princes Park 14 February 1922 ===
Caused by the election as an alderman by the Council of Councillor Robert Lowry Burns (Party?, Princes Park, last elected as a councillor 14 March 1921) on 1 February 1922, following the death of Alderman Edward James Chevalier JP (Conservative, last elected as an alderman on 9 November 1920) on 26 October 1921

No. 13 Prince's Park 14 February 1922
Party	Candidate	Votes	%	±%
Conservative	Alfred Wood	unopposed		
Registered electors				
Conservative gain from		Swing		

=== No. 26 Warbreck 14 February 1922 ===
Caused by the election as an alderman of Councillor Robert Charles Herman (Conservative, Warbreck, last elected as a councillor 1 November 1919 on 1 February 1922, following the death of Alderman Simon Jude (Conservative, last elected as an alderman on 9 November 1913) on 31 December 1921.

No. 26 Warbreck 14 February 1922
Party	Candidate	Votes	%	±%
Conservative	John Bartholomew Herman	1,905	76%	
	John Williams	596	24%	
Majority		1,309		
Registered electors				
Turnout		2,501		
Conservative hold		Swing		

=== No. 34 Wavertree 4 April 1922 ===
Caused by the death of Councillor Peter Gill (Conservative, Wavertree, elected 1 November 1919) on 8 February 1922

No. 34 Wavertree 4 April 1922
Party	Candidate	Votes	%	±%
Conservative	Arthur Angers	1,785	68%	
Labour	George Boothman	846	32%	
Majority		938		
Registered electors				
Turnout		2,631		
Conservative hold		Swing		

=== No. 28 West Derby 4 April 1922 ===
Caused by the death of Councillor William James Bailes (Conservative, West Derby, elected 1 November 1921) on 22 February 1922

No. 28 West Derby 4 April 1922
Party	Candidate	Votes	%	±%
Conservative	William John Lunt Cross	2,185	70%	
Labour	Charles Henry Taunton	952	30%	
Majority		1,233		
Registered electors				
Turnout		3,137		
Conservative hold		Swing		

== See also ==
- Liverpool City Council
- Liverpool Town Council elections 1835 – 1879
- Liverpool City Council elections 1880–present
- Mayors and Lord Mayors of Liverpool 1207 to present
- History of local government in England
