= Viscount Cross =

Title in the Peerage of the United Kingdom

The Cross arms, blazoned as 'Gules a Cross flory Argent charged with five Passion Nails Sable a Bordure of the second'

Viscount Cross, of Broughton-in-Furness in the County Palatine of Lancaster, was a title in the Peerage of the United Kingdom. It was created in 1886 for the Conservative politician Sir R. A. Cross. His eldest son the Honourable William Cross represented Liverpool West Derby in Parliament between 1888 and his early death in 1892. Lord Cross was succeeded by his grandson, the second Viscount, only son of the Honourable William Cross. He was Principal Secretary to The Treasury from 1917 to 1932. His eldest son, the third Viscount, inherited as a minor and attended the 1937 Coronation of King George VI at the age of 17. He had two daughters but no sons and on the latter's death in 2004 the viscountcy became extinct.

== Viscounts Cross (1886) ==
- Richard Assheton Cross, 1st Viscount Cross (1823–1914)
  - Hon. William Henry Cross (1856–1892)
- Richard Assheton Cross, 2nd Viscount Cross (1882–1932)
- Assheton Henry Cross, 3rd Viscount Cross (1920–2004)
