= 1888 Liverpool West Derby by-election =

UK parliamentary by-election

The 1888 Liverpool West Derby by-election was held on 10 August 1888 after the resignation of the incumbent Conservative Party MP Claud Hamilton. It was retained by the unopposed Conservative Candidate William Cross.

Liverpool West Derby by-election, 1888
| Party | Candidate | Votes | % | ±% |
|---|---|---|---|---|
| Conservative | William Cross | Unopposed | N/A | N/A |
| Conservative hold | | | | |
