= R. A. Cross, 1st Viscount Cross =

British statesman and Conservative politician

The Right Honourable The Viscount Cross GCB GCSI PC FRS DL
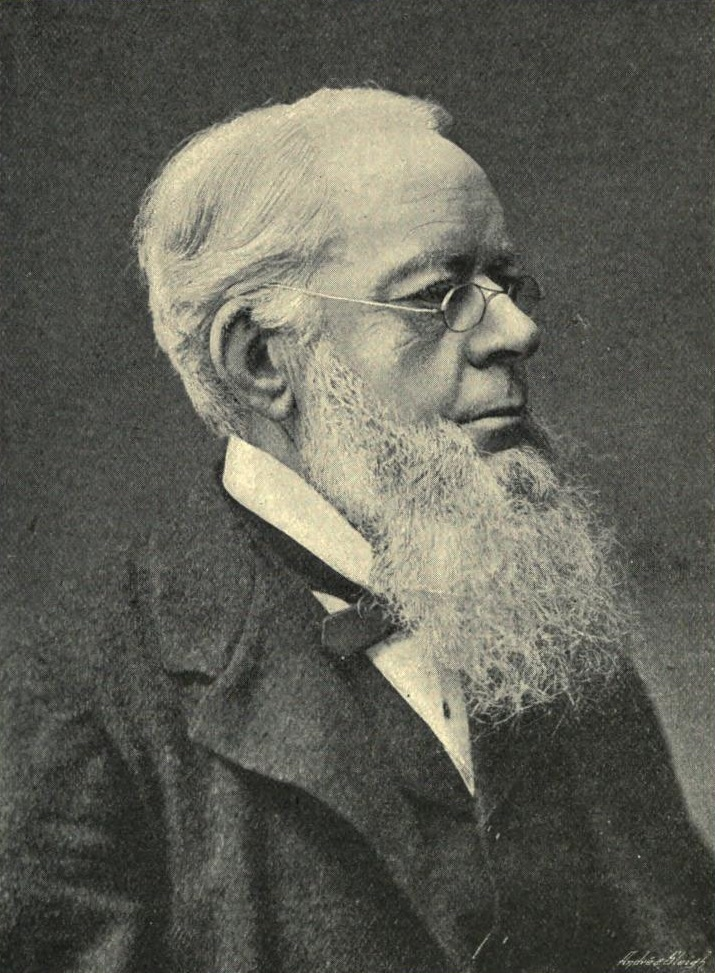

Lord Keeper of the Privy Seal
- In office 29 June 1895 – 12 November 1900
- Prime Minister: The Marquess of Salisbury
- Preceded by: The Lord Tweedmouth
- Succeeded by: The Marquess of Salisbury

Chancellor of the Duchy of Lancaster
- In office 29 June 1895 – 4 July 1895
- Prime Minister: The Marquess of Salisbury
- Preceded by: The Lord Tweedmouth
- Succeeded by: The Lord James of Hereford

Secretary of State for India
- In office 3 August 1886 – 11 August 1892
- Prime Minister: The Marquess of Salisbury
- Preceded by: The Earl of Kimberley
- Succeeded by: The Earl of Kimberley

Secretary of State for the Home Department
- In office 24 June 1885 – 1 February 1886
- Prime Minister: The Marquess of Salisbury
- Preceded by: Sir William Harcourt
- Succeeded by: Hugh Childers
- In office 21 February 1874 – 23 April 1880
- Prime Minister: Benjamin Disraeli
- Preceded by: Robert Lowe
- Succeeded by: Sir William Harcourt

Member of the House of Lords Lord Temporal
- In office 19 August 1886 – 8 January 1914; Hereditary peerage
- Preceded by: Peerage created
- Succeeded by: The 2nd Viscount Cross

Member of Parliament for Newton
- In office 18 December 1885 – 19 August 1886
- Preceded by: Constituency created
- Succeeded by: Thomas Legh

Member of Parliament for South West Lancashire
- In office 7 December 1868 – 18 December 1885; Serving with Charles Turner and John Ireland Blackburne
- Preceded by: Constituency created
- Succeeded by: Constituency abolished

Member of Parliament for Preston
- In office 24 April 1857 – 4 April 1862; Serving with Charles Grenfell
- Preceded by: Sir George Strickland, 7th Baronet
- Succeeded by: Sir Thomas Fermor-Hesketh

Personal details
- Born: 30 May 1823 Red Scar, Lancashire
- Died: 8 January 1914 (aged 90)
- Party: Conservative
- Spouse: Georgiana Lyon (d. 1907)
- Education: University of Cambridge

Richard Assheton Cross, 1st Viscount Cross, GCB, GCSI, PC, FRS, DL (30 May 1823 – 8 January 1914), known before his elevation to the peerage as R. A. Cross, was a British Conservative politician. He was Home Secretary from 1874 to 1880, and from 1885 to 1886.

== Background and education ==
Cross was born in Red Scar, near Preston, Lancashire, the fifth child and third son of William Cross JP (1771–1827), Deputy Prothonotary for the Court of Common Pleas at Lancaster and landed proprietor, and his wife Ellen, daughter of Edward Chaffers. He was educated at Rugby School, matriculated at Trinity College, Cambridge in 1842 where he graduated B.A. in 1846, and was the President of the Cambridge Union in 1845. He was admitted to Lincoln's Inn in 1844, and was called to the Bar at the Inner Temple in 1849, attaching himself to the Northern Circuit.

== Political career ==
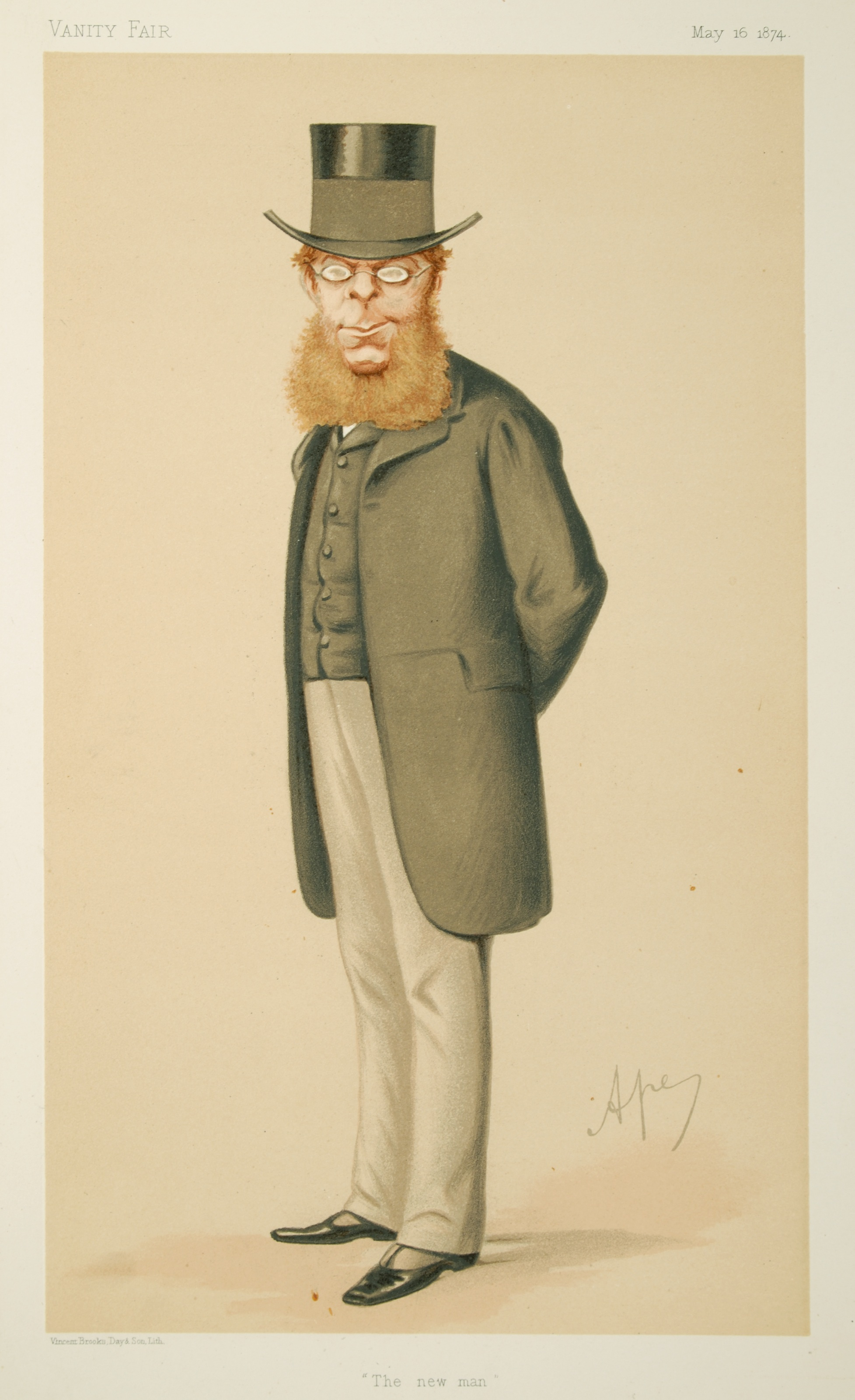
R. A. Cross caricatured by Ape (Carlo Pellegrini) in 1874.

Cross entered Parliament as one of two representatives for Preston in 1857, a seat he held until he stood down (to concentrate on business - see below) in 1862.

In 1868 Cross returned to Parliament for South West Lancashire, topping the poll and defeating Gladstone, and continued to represent this constituency until the seat was abolished in 1885. He then briefly represented Newton, until his elevation to the peerage in 1886.

Cross was Home Secretary in Disraeli's second government (1874–1880), to which post he had been appointed without first holding junior office. He was again Home Secretary in Lord Salisbury's first government (1885–1886).

In 1886 Cross was raised to the peerage, as Viscount Cross of Broughton-in-Furness in the County Palatine of Lancaster,

He was moved over to the India Office (1886–1892), where he oversaw the passage of the Indian Councils Act 1892. As India Secretary he had a reputation for reluctance to take responsibility, and for being somewhat afraid of his able deputy John Eldon Gorst who treated him with ill concealed contempt.

He was very briefly Chancellor of the Duchy of Lancaster in Salisbury's third government (1895–1902) before being elevated to the sinecure post Lord Privy Seal. In 1898 he chaired the Joint Select Committee on Electrical Energy (Generating Stations and Supply), which recommended granting compulsory purchase powers for the building of power stations. He retired in 1900.

== Business interests ==
After the death of his father-in-law Thomas Lyon (the younger) in 1859, Cross was involved in the affairs of Parr's Bank, of which Thomas Lyon the elder, uncle of the younger Thomas Lyon, was a founder. He became a partner, and dropped out of Parliament for six years. He was one of the group who changed the bank into a joint stock company in 1865, of which he acted as deputy chairman. He became its chairman in 1870.

In 1884, Cross was elected to the Board of the Manchester, Sheffield and Lincolnshire Railway, and he remained a Director of that company, and of its successor the Great Central Railway (GCR), until his death. During Board meetings, he would occasionally murmur "Where is the money to come from?" In June 1909, when he was senior Director of the GCR, that railway named one of its class 8D express passenger locomotives The Rt. Hon. Viscount Cross G.C.B., G.C.S.I. in his honour.

== Family ==
Cross married Georgiana, daughter of Thomas Lyon of Appleton Hall, in 1852; they had three daughters and four sons. The eldest son, the Hon. William Cross, represented Liverpool West Derby in Parliament. The second son, Thomas Richard Cross, died young in 1873; Charles Francis Cross, the third son, was a cleric; and John Edward Cross, the fourth son, was a land agent.

Lady Cross died in January 1907. Lord Cross survived her by seven years and died in January 1914, aged 90. He was succeeded in the viscountcy by his grandson, Richard Assheton Cross, the only son of the Honourable William Cross.

== Arms ==
Coat of arms of R. A. Cross, 1st Viscount Cross
| Crest A Griffin's Head erased Argent gorged with a Double Chain Or therefrom pendant a Mullet pierced Sable in the beak a Passion Nail of the last Escutcheon Gules a Cross flory Argent charged with five Passion Nails Sable a Bordure of the second Supporters On either side a Pegasus Argent holding in the mouth a Passion Nail Sable the dexter gorged with a Chain Or therefrom pendant a Cross flory Gules the sinister gorged with a Double Chain Or therefrom pendant a Mullet pierced Sable Motto Crede Cruci (Trust in the Cross) |

== Sources ==
- Kerry, Simon. Lansdowne: The Last Great Whig (2018), ISBN 9781910787953, OCLC 1043014305, scholarly biography of the 5th Marquess. Online review (Wall Street Journal).
- BOPCRIS database entry on Cross Committee (archived)
- "Archival material relating to R. A. Cross, 1st Viscount Cross". UK National Archives.

Parliament of the United Kingdom
| Preceded by Robert Townley Parker; Sir George Strickland, Bt | Member of Parliament for Preston; 1857–1862; With: Charles Grenfell | Succeeded by Charles Grenfell; Thomas Fermor-Hesketh |
| New constituency | Member of Parliament for South West Lancashire; 1868–1885; With: Charles Turner 1868 –1875; John Ireland Blackburne 1875–1885 | Constituency abolished |
| New constituency | Member of Parliament for Newton; 1885–1886 | Succeeded by Thomas Legh |
Political offices
| Preceded by Robert Lowe | Home Secretary; 1874–1880 | Succeeded by Sir William Harcourt |
| Preceded by Sir William Harcourt | Home Secretary; 1885–1886 | Succeeded by Hugh Childers |
| Preceded by The Earl of Kimberley | Secretary of State for India; 1886–1892 | Succeeded by The Earl of Kimberley |
| Preceded by The Lord Tweedmouth | Chancellor of the Duchy of Lancaster; 1895 | Succeeded by Sir Henry James |
| Preceded by The Lord Tweedmouth | Lord Privy Seal; 1895–1900 | Succeeded by The Marquess of Salisbury |
Peerage of the United Kingdom
| New creation | Viscount Cross; 1886–1914 | Succeeded by Richard Assheton Cross |
