= 1919 Liverpool West Derby by-election =

UK parliamentary by-election

- 26 February 1919
- Turnout: 34.3%
		Lab
Candidate	William Reginald Hall	George Nelson
Party	Unionist	Labour
Alliance	Coalition
Popular vote	6,062	4,670
Percentage	56.5%	43.5%
Swing	▼10.9%	▲10.9%
MP before election
Frederick Smith
Unionist
Subsequent MP
William Reginald Hall
Unionist

The 1919 Liverpool West Derby by-election was a parliamentary by-election held on 26 February 1919 for the British House of Commons constituency of Liverpool West Derby, in the County Palatine of Lancashire.

== Vacancy ==
The seat had become vacant on the elevation to the peerage of the constituency's Unionist Member of Parliament (MP), F. E. Smith, as Baron Birkenhead. He had been raised to the peerage to take up the post of Lord Chancellor.

== Electoral history ==
Smith had held the seat since the 1918 general election, when he was endorsed by the Coalition Government. Before that he held its predecessor seat, Liverpool Walton since the 1906 general election.

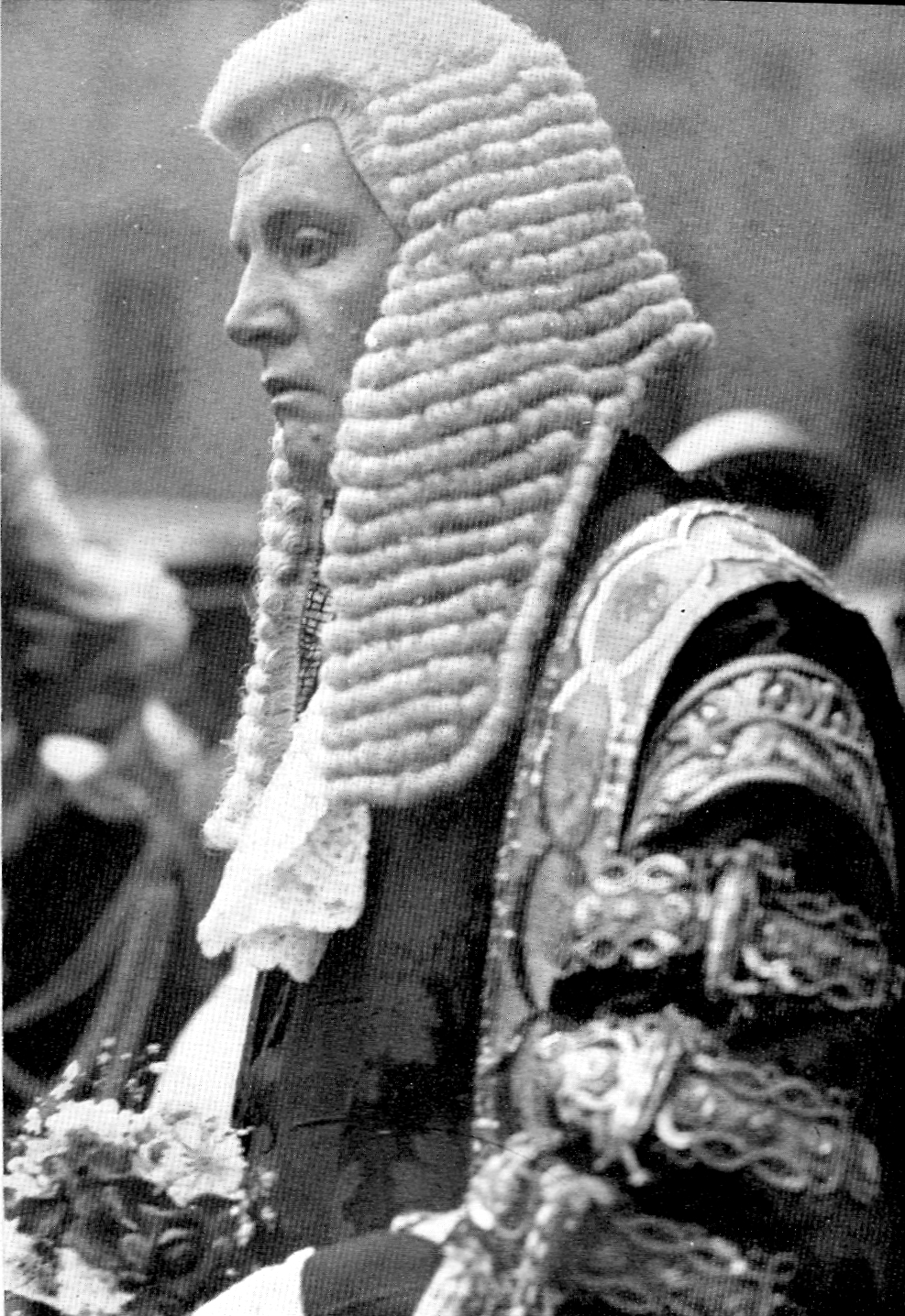
Sir F.E. Smith, newly created Lord Birkenhead

1918 general election: Liverpool West Derby
Party		Candidate	Votes	%
C	Unionist	F. E. Smith	11,622	67.4
	Labour	George Nelson	5,618	32.6
Majority			6,004	34.8
Turnout			17,240	55.1
Registered electors				
	Unionist win (new seat)			
C indicates candidate endorsed by the coalition government.

== Candidates ==
- The Unionist Party selected as its candidate Rear-Admiral Sir William Reginald Hall. Hall was endorsed by the Coalition Government.
- George Nelson stood for the Labour Party. He had stood against Smith at the recent General Election.

== Result ==
Turnout was unsurprisingly low so soon after a General Election. Hall won the seat by a much reduced margin.

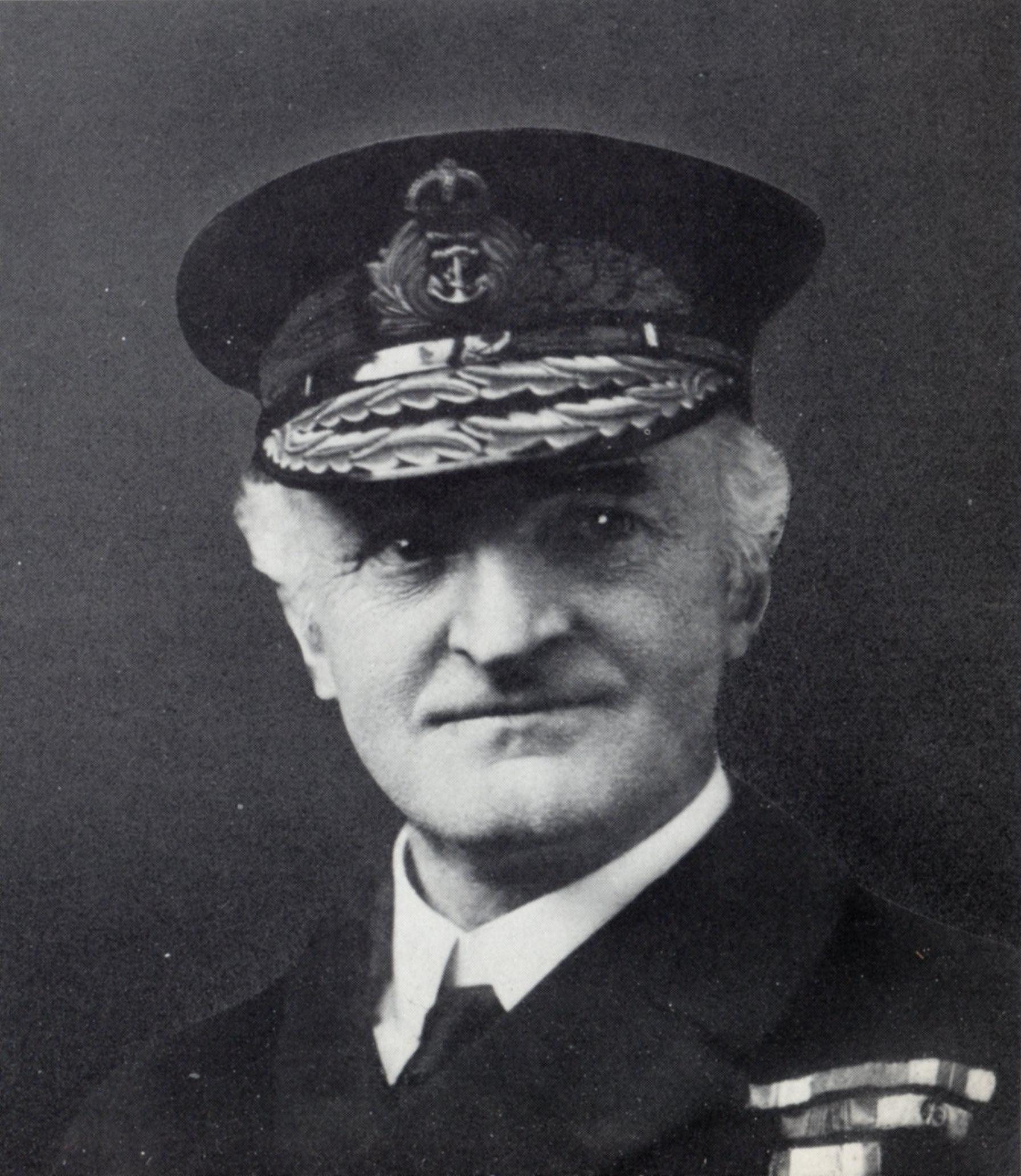
Sir Reginald Hall

Liverpool West Derby by-election, 1919
Party		Candidate	Votes	%	±%
C	Unionist	William Reginald Hall	6,062	56.5	–10.9
	Labour	George Nelson	4,670	43.5	+10.9
Majority			1,392	13.0	−21.8
Turnout			10,732	34.3	−20.8
Registered electors					
	Unionist hold		Swing	–10.9	
C indicates candidate endorsed by the coalition government.

== See also ==
- List of United Kingdom by-elections
- Liverpool West Derby constituency
