= 1954 Liverpool West Derby by-election =

UK Parliamentary by-election

The 1954 Liverpool West Derby by-election was held on 18 November 1954 after the incumbent Conservative MP, David Maxwell Fyfe was elevated to a hereditary peerage. The seat was retained by the Conservative candidate John Woollam.

Liverpool West Derby by-election, 1954
| Party | Candidate | Votes | % | ±% |
|---|---|---|---|---|
| Conservative | John Woollam | 21,158 | 53.15 | +1.54 |
| Labour Co-op | Cyril Fenton | 18,650 | 46.85 | −1.54 |
| Majority | | 2,508 | 6.30 | +3.09 |
| Turnout | | 39,808 | 58.90 | |
| Conservative hold | | Swing | | |
