= Alsop High School =

Location
- Queens Drive; Liverpool, Merseyside, L4 6SH; England; 53.4464760°N 2.9638574°W

Information
- Type: Academy
- Motto: "Achieving Excellence Together"
- Established: 1919
- Founder: James W. Alsop
- Local authority: Liverpool City Council
- Trust: Omega Multi-Academy Trust
- Specialist: Applied learning
- Department for Education URN: 148226 Tables
- Ofsted: Reports
- Head teacher: Dan Kerfoot
- Gender: Coeducational
- Age: 11 to 18
- Enrolment: 1707
- Colour
- Website: alsophigh.org.uk

Alsop High School is an English coeducational secondary and sixth form school in Walton, Liverpool. The school is part of Omega Multi-Academy Trust.

== History ==
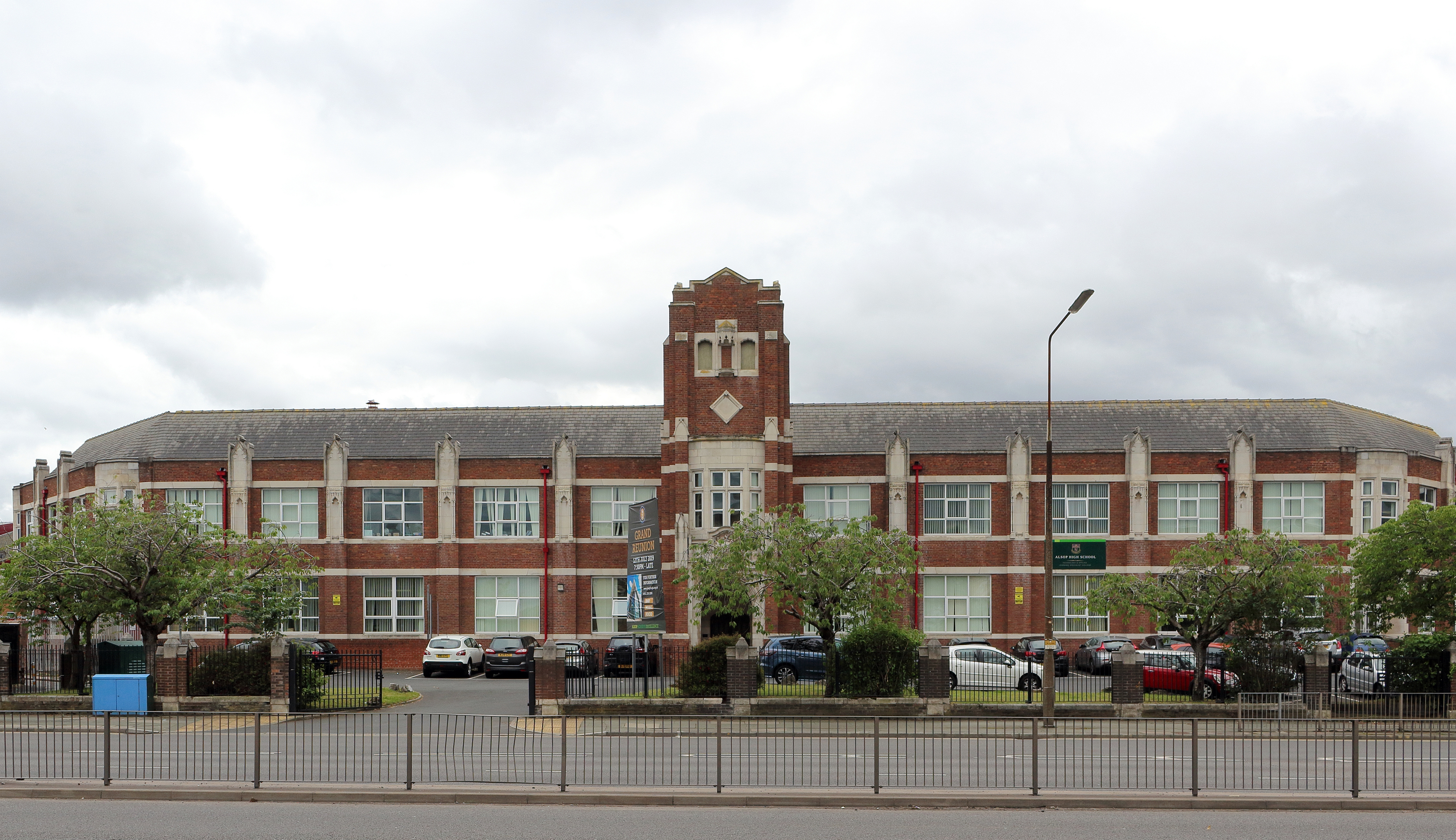
Frontage of the 1926 building on Queens Drive

The school was founded by the Liverpool Education Committee in 1919 under the chairmanship of James W. Alsop. The school moved to its current premises on Queen's Drive in 1926.

After World War II, further buildings were constructed, including a dining annex, an assembly hall, a library and an art room, which was completed around 1953-4. Previously the hall had been on the ground floor behind the front tower with windows onto the yard. When the new hall was opened, the area was converted into three classrooms onto the yard and laboratories to the front onto Queens Drive.

Further additions later included a new block with laboratories, a gym, and a metalwork shop. In recent years, the school also acquired the old Arnot Street school on County Road and adjacent to Arnot Street primary school. The lower school was designed by Gilling Dod, based in the Cunard Building, Liverpool. The lower school was demolished and the site has since been used to develop a Tesco Metro store and a car park.

Previously a community school administered by Liverpool City Council, in November 2020 the school converted to academy status. It is now sponsored by the Omega Multi-Academy Trust.

== Campus ==
Alsop High School is the largest secondary school in Liverpool at present. The current Alsop High School building was built in 1926, and an extensive refurbishment / backlog maintenance of the existing campus buildings began in September 2008. The campus recently benefited from the construction of a new £8.4m building designed by architects 2020 Liverpool and includes a new canteen, new 6th form facilities, reception area, atrium, new Spanish, humanities, and English learning pods as well as classrooms with improved IT facilities and a new dance and activity studio. The site has also benefited from extensive new landscaping and refurbishment of the listed rectory building. Aside from the Jamieson (named after a former headmaster) and 1926 buildings, there are also the MAD (Music, Art and Drama) block and the ICT block, which consists of the school's LRC (Learning Resource Centre).

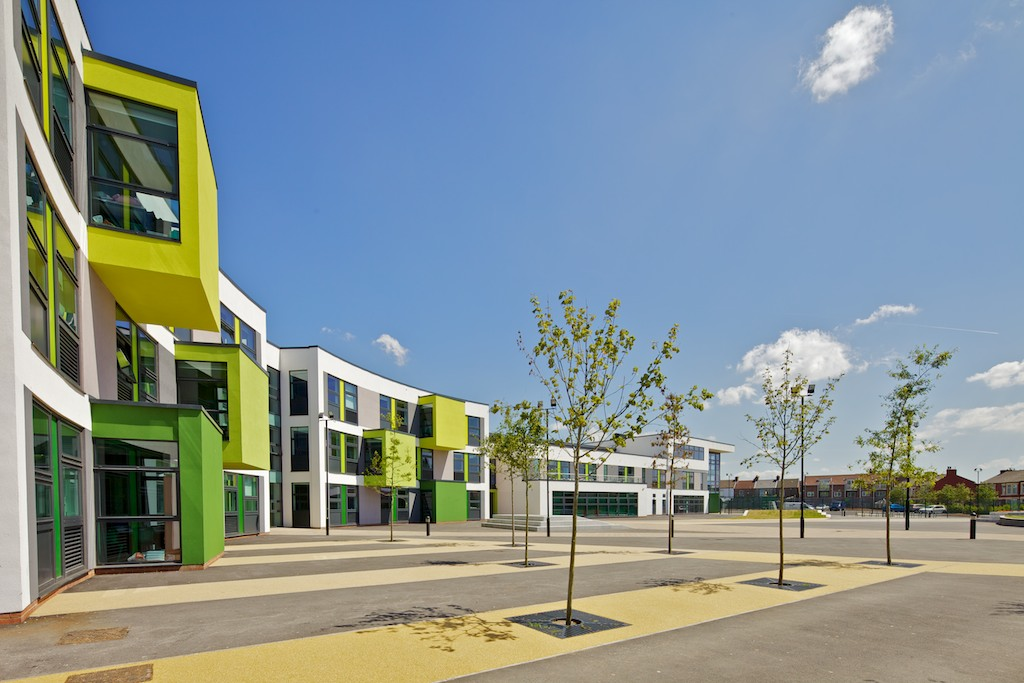
The new landscaped play areas completed 2011

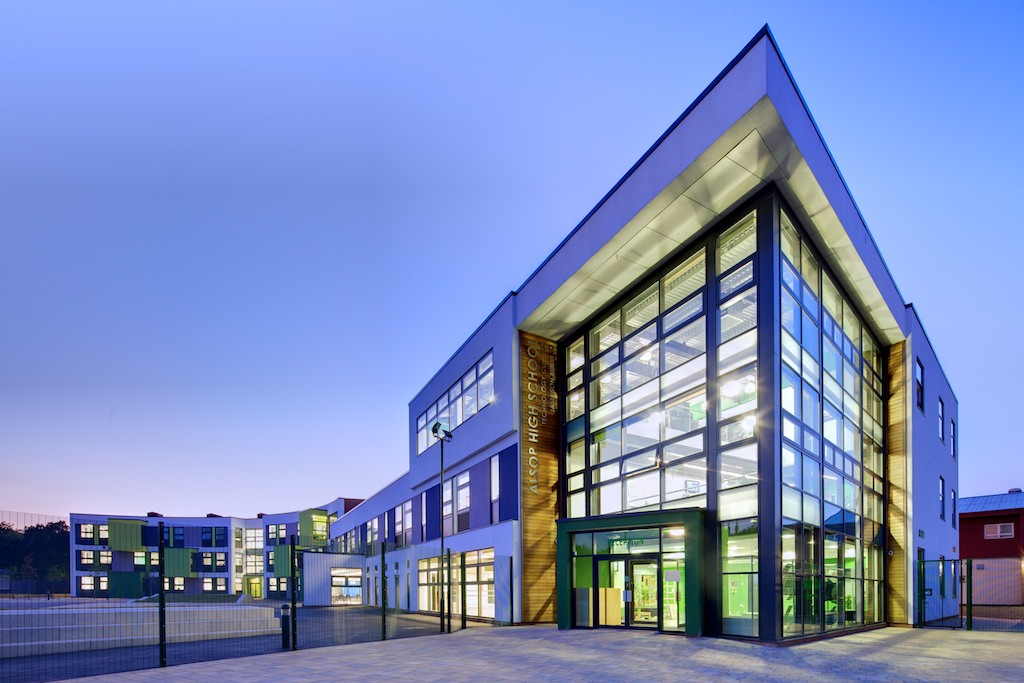
The new main entrance to Alsop High School

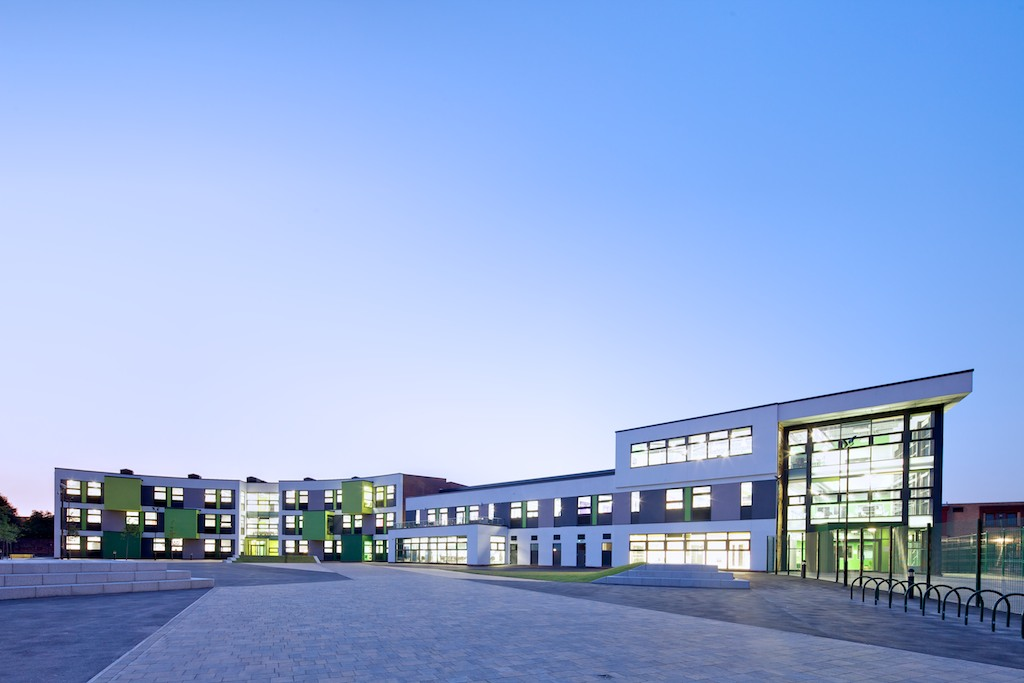
The new Jamieson Building

== Curriculum ==
Alsop High School was awarded with Applied Learning status in 2006, allowing the school to offer a range of vocational subjects.

In some subjects at Key Stage 3, students are taught in mixed ability classes, whilst in other subjects students are placed in teaching groups according to motivation, attainment and ability.

All students at Key Stage 3 study English, mathematics, science, humanities, Spanish, PE, music, drama, art and design as well as PSHCE, picking up the additional subjects of IT and Technology in Years 8 and 9.

== Extracurricular activities ==
The PE department runs activities that include athletics, badminton, basketball, boxing, cricket, fitness, football, hockey, netball, rounders, rugby, swimming, table tennis, and trampolining.

Other activities include art, dance, drama, Duke of Edinburgh's Award, guitar, keyboard, maths revision club, study club and Young Enterprise.

In 2011, the Alsop Community Magazine was founded. Since then, it has published three editions of the free magazine which contains news about the school. It is distributed around the local primary schools and community by the contributors to the magazine, who are all Alsop pupils. You can view the articles on the school web page.

In July 2012, Alsop High School was used to film part of episode 3 of Utopia, where a fictional school shooting is filmed. The scene received 37 complaints to UK media regulator Ofcom, proving especially controversial as the scene aired only a month after the Sandy Hook Elementary School shootings in the United States. This caused Channel 4 to consider whether to carry on airing Utopia. It continued after much deliberation for 2 series.

== Notable former pupils ==
- Chris Carey, classical scholar
- Mike Carey, writer
- Sir Arnold Hall, chairman of Hawker Siddeley (1967-1986)
- Stephen Molyneux, Microsoft emeritus professor, education technology entrepreneur
- Jimmy Mulville, producer, actor, writer and co-founder of Hat Trick Productions
- Peter Reading, poet
- Alexei Sayle, comedian
- Bob Wareing, former MP for Liverpool West Derby
- Ian McCulloch, lead singer for Echo & the Bunnymen

== Notable former staff ==
- Philip Alexander Jamieson, former head teacher, was awarded an OBE in 2012
- Gérard Houllier, teaching assistant 1969-70, former Liverpool, Aston Villa and PSG manager
