= Richard Assheton Cross, 2nd Viscount Cross =

British noble and civil servant

Richard Assheton Cross, 2nd Viscount Cross (28 January 1882 – 14 March 1932), was a British peer and civil servant.

Cross was the only son of the Honourable William Cross, eldest son of R. A. Cross, 1st Viscount Cross. His mother was Mary, daughter of William Lewthwaite, of Broadgate, Cumberland. His father died when Cross was ten. He was subsequently educated at Eton and University College, Oxford, and succeeded his grandfather in the viscountcy in 1914.

Lord Cross was private secretary to successive Permanent Secretaries to the Treasury from 1912 to 1917. The latter year he was appointed Principal Secretary to The Treasury, a post he held until his death 15 years later.

Lord Cross married Maud Evelyn Inigo Jones, daughter of Major-General Inigo Richmund Jones, in 1918. They had three sons and a daughter. He died in March 1932, aged 50, and was succeeded by his eldest son, Assheton. The Viscountess Cross died in April 1976.

Peerage of the United Kingdom
Preceded by R. A. Cross	Viscount Cross; 1914–1932	Succeeded by Henry Assheton Cross
