= Eric Ogden (politician) =

British politician

Eric Ogden (23 August 1923 – 5 May 1997) was a British Labour Party politician.

== Early life ==
Eric Ogden was a miner and studied at the Wigan and District Mining and Technical College.

== Political career ==
He served as a Liverpool Borough Councillor for the ward of Croxteth from 1959 to his selection as the parliamentary candidate for West Derby. He was selected by over 80% of the West Derby constituency party to stand for election he defeated future MP Robert Parry.

He was originally elected Labour Member of Parliament (MP) for Liverpool West Derby at the 1964 general election and served his constituency until deselected in June 1981. He was among the Labour MPs who defected to the new Social Democratic Party in October 1981. At the 1983 general election, he sought re-election but came third with 18% of the vote while the Labour candidate Robert Wareing won. It was a time of intense political change and Eric no longer thought that the party he joined was any longer true to the political principles he believed in. He was a member of the Stamps Advisory Committee and Chairman of the Falkland Islands Association (he visited the Islands on at least three separate occasions before and after the Falklands War).

== Personal life ==
He enjoyed photography and gardening and was a keen independent traveller. He married twice and had a son by his first wife and two sons by his second wife, Marjorie Ogden, who died on 24 March 2010.

Parliament of the United Kingdom
Preceded by John Woollam	Member of Parliament for Liverpool West Derby; 1964–1983	Succeeded by Bob Wareing
