= Bob Wareing =

British politician (1930–2015)

Member of Parliament for Liverpool West Derby
- In office 9 June 1983 – 12 April 2010
- Preceded by: Eric Ogden
- Succeeded by: Stephen Twigg

Personal details
- Born: Robert Nelson Wareing; 20 August 1930 Liverpool, England
- Died: 1 May 2015 (aged 84) London, England
- Party: Independent
- Other political affiliations: Labour (before 2007)
- Spouse: Betty Coward (m. 1962; died 1989)
- Education: Alsop High School
- Alma mater: University of London

Robert Nelson Wareing (20 August 1930 – 1 May 2015) was a British politician who served as Member of Parliament (MP) for Liverpool West Derby from 1983 to 2010. Until 2007, he was a Labour MP but resigned the party whip following his deselection as the party's candidate for his constituency.

== Early life ==
Wareing was born in Liverpool and attended Ranworth Square Council School (now Ranworth Square Primary School) in Norris Green, then Alsop High School in Liverpool. He gained an external BSc degree in Economics from the University of London in 1956 and a teacher's certificate from Bolton College of Education (now part of the University of Greater Manchester) the following year.

He was a local government officer for Liverpool Corporation from 1946 to 1948 and from 1950 to 1956. He was a lecturer at Brooklyn Technical College in Great Barr from 1957 to 1959, at Wigan and District Mining and Technical College from 1959 to 1963, at Liverpool College of Commerce on Tithebarn Street from 1963 to 1965, at Liverpool City Institute of Further Education from 1964 to 1972, and at the Central Liverpool College of Further Education from 1972 to 1983 as Deputy Head of Adult Education. Wareing replaced Eric Heffer as the councillor for the Pirrie ward in Walton constituency. He represented the ward for 19 years.

== Parliamentary career ==
Wareing was first elected to the House of Commons at the 1983 general election, having previously stood (unsuccessfully) in Liverpool Edge Hill at the by-election in March 1979 and at the 1979 general election. He also contested Berwick upon Tweed in 1970.

Wareing spoke during a House of Commons debate on Bosnia on 29 April 1993. He objected to the recognition in 1992 of Bosnia and Herzegovina by the British government: "People have been talking about the Bosnians as a nation. There is no nationality of Bosnian. They are Serbs, Croats and Muslims. Even the Muslims are Serbs". His statements on the subject were contrary to historical fact, according to Mladen Grbin.

Wareing, who was Chairman of the All-Party British-Yugoslav Parliamentary Group from 1994, held talks in 1995 with the Bosnian Serb leaders Radovan Karadžić and General Ratko Mladić. Wareing told neither his constituency party, nor the Labour Party nationally about his intention to meet Karadžić, who was then wanted for war crimes, during his visit to the Serb controlled areas of Bosnia. Wareing, who was accompanied by the Conservative peer Lord Harlech, was not directly criticised at the time by Tony Blair, the Labour leader, although Blair's spokesman did distance him from Wareing.

In June 1997, Wareing was suspended from membership of the Labour Party on suspicion of breaking the rules governing MP's lobbying. In July 1997, the House of Commons Select Committee on Standards and Privileges reprimanded and suspended Wareing from the Commons for a week over the non-declaration of the interests of his consultancy firm. He was found to have received illicit funds as a lobbyist from Serbian firms.

Nicknamed "Serbian Bob" or the "member for Belgrade" as a result of his pro-Serb views, he was one of the few Labour MPs to vote against the NATO intervention over Kosovo in 1999. Wareing was a member of the Socialist Campaign Group, and frequently rebelled against the government. On 31 October 2006, Wareing was one of 12 Labour MPs to back Plaid Cymru and the Scottish National Party's call for an inquiry into the Iraq War.

In August 2007, Wareing failed to gain sufficient support from Labour Party and trade union members in his constituency party to avoid facing a re-selection challenge as the Labour candidate for the next general election. On 16 September 2007, Wareing was defeated in a selection contest by Stephen Twigg, a former MP. Wareing denounced his de-selection as the work of a "New Labour Mafia", announcing his intention to seek re-election as an independent, and resigned the Labour whip. However, on 4 March 2010, Wareing announced he would not be standing at the general election.

According to a report in The Sunday Telegraph in February 2010, using newly disclosed parliamentary records, from April 2004 to July 2009, Wareing booked House of Commons dining facilities on 28 occasions for the hosting of Russian businessmen on behalf of the Leading Ventures Associates, or affiliated enterprises; the LVA course in total costing the businessmen £4,000 each.

== Personal life ==
He married Betty Coward (born July 1929) on 16 August 1962. She died in March 1989 in Lambeth.

Wareing died on 1 May 2015 at the age of 84. He had been admitted to hospital in London with a chest infection.

== BBC Heir Hunters ==
On 29 February 2016 Bob Wareing featured on the BBC television programme Heir Hunters, a series that follows probate researchers tracking down heirs to unclaimed deceased estates. Since Bob's wife died in 1989 and the couple had no children, there were no immediate heirs to his estate. The programme followed probate research company Fraser and Fraser's research into Bob Wareing's family tree in an attempt to find heirs. It also featured people who knew Bob during his life, including the then Labour party leader, Jeremy Corbyn. In the end the research company was able to locate 53 beneficiaries to Wareing's estate.

== Notes ==
Parliament of the United Kingdom
Preceded by Eric Ogden	Member of Parliament for Liverpool West Derby; 1983–2010	Succeeded by Stephen Twigg
