= John Woollam (politician) =

British politician

John Victor Woollam (14 August 1927 – 1 February 2006) was a British Conservative politician. He was elected as the Member of Parliament (MP) for Liverpool West Derby at a 1954 by-election. He served until 1964, when the seat was gained by Labour candidate Eric Ogden. Woollam was the last Conservative MP to represent Liverpool West Derby, which has become a Labour stronghold in recent years.

Parliament of the United Kingdom
Preceded by David Maxwell Fyfe	Member of Parliament for Liverpool West Derby; 1954–1964	Succeeded by Eric Ogden
Preceded by John Eden	Baby of the House; 1954–1955	Succeeded by Philip Clarke
