= Peter Reading =

English poet and author (1946–2011)

Peter Reading (27 July 1946 – 17 November 2011) was an English poet and the author of 26 collections of poetry. He is known for his deep interest in nature and the use of classical metres. He was widely regarded as an influential alternative presence on the UK poetry scene, and The Oxford Companion to Twentieth-Century Poetry describes his verse as "strongly anti-romantic, disenchanted and usually satirical". Interviewed by Robert Potts, he described his work as a combination of "painstaking care" and "misanthropy".

== Background ==
Reading was educated at Alsop High School. After studying painting at Liverpool College of Art, he worked as a schoolteacher at Ruffwood School, Kirkby (1967–68), and at Liverpool College of Art, where he taught Art History (1968–70). He then worked for 22 years as a weighbridge operator at an animal feed mill in Shropshire, a job which left him free to think, until he was sacked for refusing to wear a uniform introduced by new owners of the business. His only break was a two-year residency at Sunderland Polytechnic (1981–83). After leaving Liverpool, he lived for 40 years in various parts of Shropshire, in later years in Little Stretton, near Ludlow.

The benevolence of America’s Lannan Foundation rescued him from poverty. He was the first writer to hold the one-year Lannan writing residency in Marfa, Texas (in 1999), and is the only British poet to have won the Lannan Award for Poetry twice, in 1990 and 2004, as well as the only poet to read an entire life’s work for the Foundation's DVD archive – his filmed readings for Lannan (made in 2001 and 2010) of 26 poetry collections make up the only archive of its kind. His 1997 collection Work in Regress was shortlisted for the T. S. Eliot Prize.

== Awards ==
- Cholmondeley Award (1978)
- Dylan Thomas Award (1983), for Diplopic
- Whitbread Prize for Poetry (1986), for Stet
- Lannan Literary Award for Poetry, 1990 and 2004.

== Poetry collections ==
- Water and Waste (1970)
- For the Municipality's Elderly (1974)
- The Prison Cell & Barrel Mystery (1976)
- Nothing for Anyone (1977)
- Fiction (1979)
- Tom o'Bedlam's Beauties (1981)
- Diplopic (1983)
- 5x5x5x5x5 (1983)
- C (1984)
- Ukulele Music (1985)
- Going On (1985)
- Essential Reading (1986)
- Stet (1986)
- Final Demands (1988)
- Perduta Gente (1989)
- Shitheads (1989)
- Three in One (1991)
- Evagatory (1992)
- Last Poems (1994)
- Collected Poems Vol 1: 1970-1984 (1995)
- Eschatological (1996)
- Collected Poems Vol 2: 1985-1996 (1996)
- Chinoiserie (1997)
- Work in Regress (1997)
- Apopthegmatic (1999)
- Ob (1999)
- Repetitious (1999)
- Marfan (2000)
- [untitled] (2001)
- Faunal (2002)
- Civil (2002)
- Collected Poems Vol 3: 1997-2003 (2003)
- -273.15 (2005)
- Vendange Tardive (2010)

== See also ==
- English translations of Homer: Peter Reading
