= People's Union for Economy =

The People's Union for Economy (PUE) was a pressure group in the United Kingdom in the early 1920s which campaigned for retrenchment in public expenditure.

The PUE began as a parliamentary committee (founded in February 1921) with around sixty members of both Houses of Parliament. These included Lord Salisbury, Lord Robert Cecil, Lord Selborne, Lord Midleton, Sir Arthur Steel-Maitland, Lord Chalmers, Lord Inchape, Walter Leaf, Lord Cowdray. It persuaded approximately 150 MPs to sign a demand for control of government spending. Lord Salisbury believed the PUE "had a good share in impelling the government towards economy". With the Middle Class Union it "helped create the atmosphere in which Christopher Addison was driven first from the Ministry of Health and then from office".
