= Arnold Alexander Hall =

English aeronautical engineer (1915–2000)

Sir Arnold Alexander Hall
- Hall in 1975, attending a lunch where he won the Hambro award for 'Businessman of the Year'.
- Born: 23 April 1915; Liverpool, England
- Died: 9 January 2000 (aged 84); Dorney, Berkshire, England
- Spouse(s): Moira Constance Dione Rathmell; Iola (Nealon) Hall
- Children: Caroline, Elizabeth and Veronica
- Engineering career
- Projects: de Havilland Comet 1
- Awards: Albert Medal (1983)

Sir Arnold Alexander Hall FRS FRAeS (23 April 1915 – 9 January 2000) was an English aeronautical engineer, scientist and industrialist.

== Early life ==
Hall was born in Liverpool, and attended Alsop High School in Walton, before going to Clare College, Cambridge, where he took the Mechanical Science Tripos, and was awarded a first class honours degree with distinction in aeronautics, heat engines, applied mathematics and theory of structure. He also won a unique trio of awards – the Rex Moir Prize in Engineering, the John Bernard Seely Prize in Aeronautics, and the Ricardo Prize in Thermodynamics. By now, his interest in aeronautics had grown into something more than the academic, so he learnt to fly.

== Career ==
In 1938, Hall joined the staff of the Royal Aircraft Establishment where he remained throughout the war. He was concerned first with aerodynamic work and later with the development of gun sights and aircraft armament. In 1945 he was appointed Zaharoff Professor of Aviation in the University of London and Head of the Department of Aeronautics at the Imperial College of Science and Technology. He initiated the construction of new laboratories concerned with aerodynamic and structural research at Imperial College and became a member of the Academic Council of the University of London.

In 1951, he became Director of the Royal Aircraft Establishment at Farnborough, a post held until 1955. This period in the history of the Establishment is particularly connected with the building up of the new aerodynamic and naval aviation equipment at Bedford, with the extension of the Establishment's connections with Laboratories overseas, and particularly those in Europe, and widening of knowledge on fatigue in aircraft structures arising from the Establishment's work following the accidents to de Havilland Comet aircraft. In 1955, he became Technical Director of the Hawker Siddeley Group. In 1958, he was appointed managing director of the newly formed Bristol Siddeley Engines Limited which was an amalgamation of the Bristol Engine Company and Armstrong Siddeley Motors. The merger became effective on 1 April 1959, and his first task was to amalgamate the varied interests and functioning of the two companies, a managerial undertaking of some complexity.

In March 1963, he became vice-chairman and managing director of the Hawker Siddeley Group and in July 1967, was elected chairman and managing director. In this capacity, he was Chairman of Hawker Siddeley Aviation Ltd, Hawker Siddeley Dynamics Ltd., Hawker Siddeley Diesels Ltd. (the Holding Company for Blackstone, Lister, Mirrlees National and Petters), Hawker Siddeley Electric Ltd. (the Holding Company for Brush Electrical Engineering, Fuller Electric and Crompton Parkinson), Hawker Siddeley Holdings Ltd. (the Holding Company for Gloster Saro, Thomas Green & Son, Saro Products, Hands Trailers, and Norstel & Templewood Hawksley), and High Duty Alloys Ltd.

He remained at Hawker Siddeley until it was absorbed into British Aerospace in 1977.

== Personal life ==
He was married twice, having three daughters (Caroline, Elizabeth and Veronica) with his first wife, and stepsons and stepdaughters from both marriages.

== Aeronautical engineering ==
In 1939 while Chief Superintendent of the RAE, in association with Sidney Cotton he worked on the modifications needed to enable Supermarine Spitfires to be used in the photo-reconnaissance role.

During World War II, he designed gyroscopic gun-sights for D-day fighter aircraft, and the compressor for Frank Whittle's first jet engine. He was noted for chairing the committee investigating the various crashes involving the de Havilland Comet 1, which identified the design flaws responsible. He expanded the Hawker Siddeley group and chaired a Franco-British Concorde design group.

== Crash investigation ==
He led the RAE Farnborough team that eventually discovered the cause of several de Havilland Comet jet airliner crashes. Some of the methods pioneered during this investigation (such as wreckage reconstruction) were later widely copied throughout the aviation industry, and became standard practice internationally.

== Honours ==
In 1953, Hall was made a Fellow of the Royal Society, and was knighted in 1954. He was pro-chancellor of Warwick University from 1965 to 1970, and chancellor of Loughborough University of Technology from 1980 to 1989. He received an Honorary Degree (Doctor of Science) from the University of Bath in 1966.

He served as President of the Royal Aeronautical Society from May 1958 to May 1959. He was elected a Fellow of the Society in 1946, was a former Council Member, and served as Vice-President in 1956. He was a Chartered Engineer.

In 1959, Hall received the Dutch Aero Club von Baumhauer Medal, which is awarded only every five years, for "his meritorious work on behalf of Aeronautical Science in general and particularly his outstanding contribution to the knowledge and understanding of the problems of fatigue in aircraft structures".

In 1962, he was awarded the Royal Aeronautical Society's Gold Medal, its highest honour. In January 1963, he was elected an Honorary Fellow of the Institute of Aerospace Sciences in the United States, q.n award given annually to two persons of eminence in aerospace technology. He was elected an Honorary Fellow of the Royal Aeronautical Society in December 1965.

Academic offices
Preceded by Lord Pilkington	Chancellor of Loughborough University; 1980–1989	Succeeded by Sir Denis Rooke
Professional and academic associations
Preceded by Sir George Edwards	President of the Royal Aeronautical Society; 1958–1959	Succeeded by Peter Masefield
