= Liverpool West Derby =

Parliamentary constituency in the United Kingdom, 1885 onwards

Coordinates: 53.439°N 2.891°W

Liverpool, West Derby
- Borough constituency for the House of Commons
- Interactive map of boundaries since 2024
- Location within North West England
- County: Merseyside
- Electorate: 70,730 (March 2020)

Current constituency
- Created: 1885
- Member of Parliament: Ian Byrne (Labour)
- Seats: One
- Created from: Liverpool

Liverpool, West Derby is a constituency (Note: A borough constituency (for the purposes of election expenses and type of returning officer)) represented in the House of Commons of the UK Parliament since 2019 by Ian Byrne of the Labour Party. (Note: As with all constituencies, the constituency elects one Member of Parliament (MP) by the first past the post system of election at least every five years.)

== Constituency profile ==
Liverpool West Derby is a constituency in Merseyside. It covers the eastern neighbourhoods of the city of Liverpool, including West Derby, Tuebrook, Old Swan, Knotty Ash and Dovecot. It also includes the area of Page Moss which lies outside the city boundaries in the neighbouring Metropolitan Borough of Knowsley. Liverpool is a large port city with a history of slave trading and importation of goods for Lancashire's industry. The city underwent economic decline in the 1970s as the docks and manufacturing industries declined in importance, but has experienced regeneration in the 21st century. This constituency is highly-deprived, particularly so in Tuebrook and Page Moss which are in the top 10% most-deprived areas in England. West Derby has average levels of wealth. The average house price in the constituency is lower than the rest of North West England and less than half the national average.

In general, residents of Liverpool West Derby have low levels of education and household income, and few work in professional occupations. The child poverty rate is above average and the percentage of residents claiming unemployment benefits is higher than the country as a whole. Like much of the rest of Liverpool, the percentage of residents identifying as Christian is high and there is a large population of Catholics due to historic Irish migration. White people made up 90% of the population at the 2021 census. Most of the constituency is represented by the Labour Party at the local council level, although the area around Tuebrook elected councillors from the small Liberal Party. An estimated 51% of voters in the constituency supported remaining in the European Union in the 2016 referendum, marginally higher than the nationwide figure of 48%.

== Boundaries ==
Map of boundaries from 2010–2024

=== Historic ===
Liverpool West Derby in Lancashire, boundaries used 1974–83

1885–1918: The Municipal Borough of Liverpool ward of West Derby.

1918–1950: The County Borough of Liverpool wards of Anfield, Breckfield, and West Derby.

1950–1955: The County Borough of Liverpool wards of Croxteth and West Derby.

1955–1983: The County Borough of Liverpool wards of Clubmoor, Croxteth, Dovecot, and Gillmoss.

1983–1997: The City of Liverpool wards of Clubmoor, Croxteth, Dovecot, Gillmoss, and Pirrie.

1997–2010: The City of Liverpool wards of Clubmoor, Croxteth, Dovecot, Gillmoss, Pirrie, and Tuebrook.

2010–2024: The City of Liverpool wards of Croxteth, Knotty Ash, Norris Green, Tuebrook and Stoneycroft, West Derby, and Yew Tree.

Following their review of parliamentary representation in Merseyside, the Boundary Commission created a modified West Derby constituency, which was fought at the 2010 general election. The commission's initial proposal to create a cross-border "Croxteth and Kirkby" constituency (which would have contained electoral wards from Knowsley borough, as well as from Liverpool) was dropped on its public consultation.

=== Current ===
Further to the 2023 review of Westminster constituencies which came into effect for the 2024 general election, the constituency was defined as being composed of the following wards of the City of Liverpool as they existed on 1 December 2020:

- The Metropolitan Borough of Knowsley wards of: Page Moss; Swanside.
- The City of Liverpool wards of: Knotty Ash; Old Swan; Tuebrook and Stoneycroft; West Derby; Yew Tree.

The constituency was subject to significant change, with the addition of the two Knowsley Borough wards from the constituency of Knowsley and the Liverpool City (former) ward of Old Swan from Liverpool Wavertree. These were partly offset by the transfer of the Croxteth and Norris Green wards to Liverpool Walton.

Liverpool was subject to a comprehensive local government boundary review which came into effect in May 2023. As a result, the new constituency boundaries do not align with the revised ward boundaries. The constituency now comprises the following from the 2024 general election:

- The Metropolitan Borough of Knowsley wards of: Page Moss; Swanside.
- The City of Liverpool wards or part wards of: Anfield (small part); Broadgreen; Kensington & Fairfield (small part); Knotty Ash & Dovecot Park; Old Swan East; Old Swan West (nearly all); Sandfield Park; Stoneycroft; Tuebrook Breckside Park (majority); Tuebrook Larkhill (majority); West Derby Deysbrook; West Derby Leyfield; West Derby Muirhead (most); Yew Tree.

The constituency is one of five covering the city of Liverpool and covers the eastern suburbs of the city, including Broadgreen, Knotty Ash, Old Swan, Tuebrook, and Stoneycroft as well as West Derby itself. It extends into contiguous parts of the Borough of Knowsley, including the Page Moss area.

== History ==
The seat was created in the Redistribution of Seats Act 1885 and can be considered a safe seat from 1964 to the present day for the Labour Party, having retained the seat at every general election since then. However, in the early-1980s, it was briefly held by the SDP as a result of sitting Labour MP Eric Ogden being among many defectors. (Note: See Labour Party (UK), who at the time called for withdrawal from the EEC (the Common Market) and removal of nuclear weapons during the Cold War. These considerable defections caused Labour to change its policies.) Labour regained the seat at the 1983 general election, where Bob Wareing won the seat back for Labour.

Before 1964, it was held by the Conservative Party, although their share of the vote has declined considerably; so much so that at four recent general elections, they have finished in fourth place; however they managed to place in third at the 2015 general election and second place in 2017 and 2019.

At the general elections of 1997 and 2001, the Liverpool West Derby seat was the only constituency in England in which a minor party finished in second place, the Liberal Party who had (Note: Terms of office to date: 2003-2015) all three local councillors for one electoral ward in the area. At the 2005 general election, however, the Liberals were pushed into third place by the Liberal Democrats and fell to fourth place in 2015, with UKIP finishing in second place.

Sir F E Smith

Sir Frederick Edwin Smith, then Solicitor General in the David Lloyd George Coalition Government, was returned for Liverpool West Derby at the 1918 general election; when constituency reorganisation abolished his former neighbouring Walton seat. He sat for only two months, being promoted Lord High Chancellor of Great Britain and raised to the peerage as Lord Birkenhead in February 1919. He was the first of two MPs for this seat to achieve the highest legal office.

David Maxwell Fyfe

David Maxwell Fyfe, KC, MP from 1935 to 1954 (including World War II) became the highest judge in the country, the Lord Chancellor, having been the Attorney General and Solicitor General for England and Wales. He helped to co-write the European Convention on Human Rights and was one of the key prosecutors at the Nuremberg Trials jointly with the (Labour-member) prosecutor Sir Hartley Shawcross. At this task was a "capable lawyer, efficient administrator and concerned housemaster". There were misgivings in some quarters as to how Fyfe would perform, cross-examination not being regarded as one of his strengths. However his cross-examination of Hermann Goering is one of the most noted cross-examinations in history. Tusa noted "Faced with sustained and methodical competence rather than brilliance, Goering...crumbled".

Stephen Twigg

Stephen Twigg ousted Michael Portillo in the normally right-leaning Enfield Southgate seat (the archetypal "Portillo moment") and represented it from 1997 until the 2005 general election. He briefly served as schools minister before that year's general election, which he lost, before five years later standing for this normally left-leaning seat in Liverpool.

== Members of Parliament ==
Election	Member	Party
1885	Lord Claud Hamilton	Conservative
1888 by-election	Hon. William Cross	Conservative
1893 by-election	Walter Long	Conservative
1900	Samuel Higginbottom	Conservative
1903 by-election	William Rutherford	Conservative
1918	Sir F. E. Smith, Bt	Conservative
1919 by-election	Sir Reginald Hall	Conservative
1923	Sydney Jones	Liberal
1924	Sir John Sandeman Allen	Conservative
1935 by-election	David Maxwell Fyfe	Conservative
1954 by-election	John Woollam	Conservative
1964	Eric Ogden	Labour
1981	Eric Ogden	SDP
1983	Bob Wareing	Labour
2007	Bob Wareing	Independent
2010	Stephen Twigg	Labour Co-operative
2019	Ian Byrne	Labour
2024	Ian Byrne	Independent
2025	Ian Byrne	Labour

== Elections ==
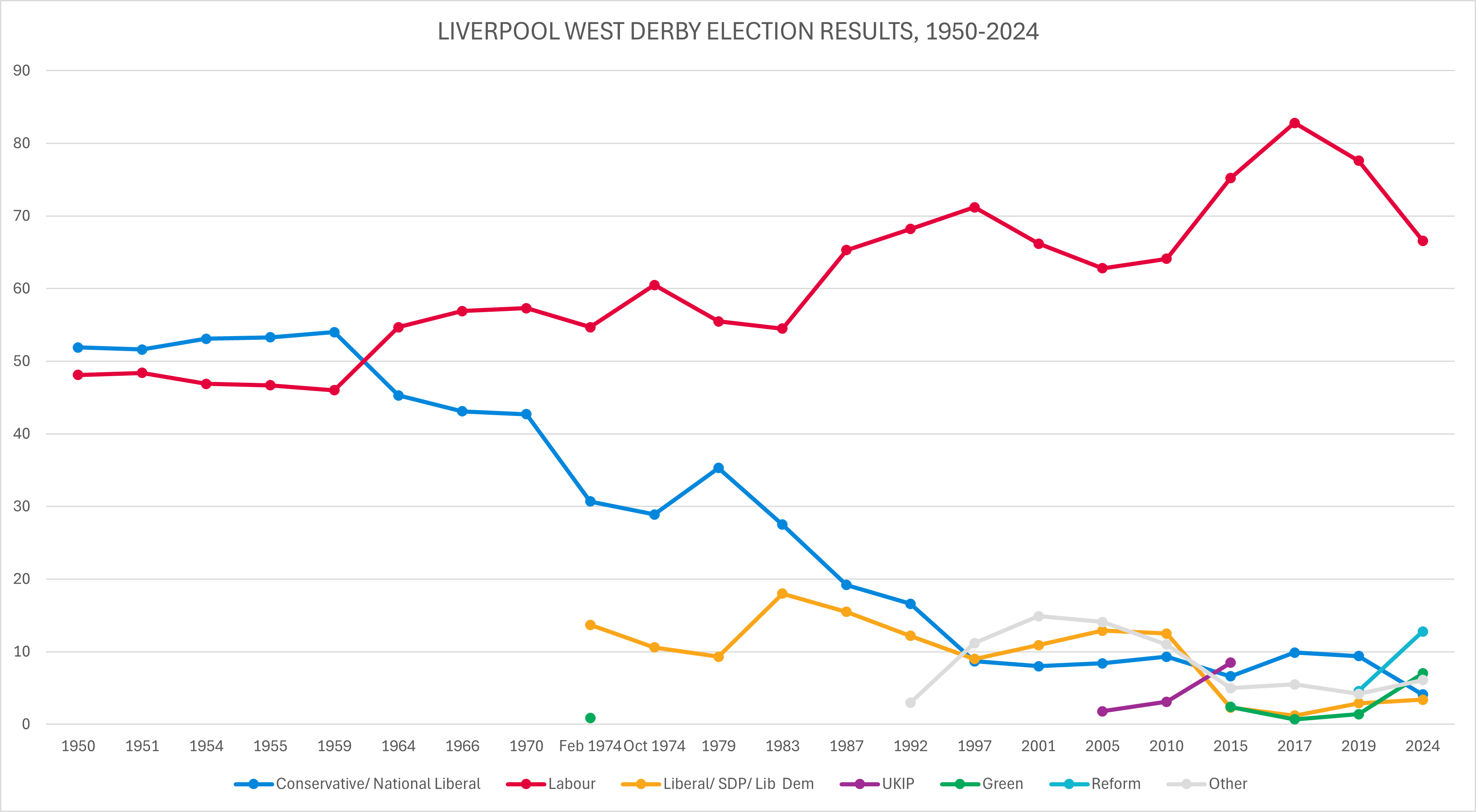
Election results (1950–2024)

=== Elections in the 2020s ===
General election 2024: Liverpool West Derby
Party	Candidate	Votes	%	±%
Labour	Ian Byrne	25,302	66.6	−11.3
Reform	Jack Boyd	4,879	12.8	+7.9
Green	Maria Coughlan	2,647	7.0	+5.1
Liberal	Steve Radford	2,336	6.1	+2.2
Conservative	Charlotte Duthie	1,566	4.1	−4.5
Liberal Democrats	Kayleigh Halpin	1,276	3.4	+0.7
Majority		20,423	53.8	−14.4
Turnout		38,006	54.3	−11.7
Labour hold		Swing		

=== Elections in the 2010s ===
General election 2019: Liverpool West Derby
Party	Candidate	Votes	%	±%
Labour	Ian Byrne	34,117	77.6	―5.2
Conservative	Tom Bradley	4,133	9.4	―0.5
Brexit Party	Ray Pearson	2,012	4.6	New
Liberal	Steve Radford	1,826	4.2	―0.6
Liberal Democrats	Paul Parr	1,296	2.9	+1.7
Green	Will Ward	605	1.4	+0.7
Majority		29,984	68.2	―4.7
Turnout		43,989	67.0	―2.0
Labour hold		Swing		

General election 2017: Liverpool West Derby
Party	Candidate	Votes	%	±%
Labour Co-op	Stephen Twigg	37,371	82.8	+7.6
Conservative	Paul Richardson	4,463	9.9	+3.3
Liberal	Steve Radford	2,150	4.8	―0.2
Liberal Democrats	Paul Parr	545	1.2	―1.1
Green	Will Ward	329	0.7	―1.7
Independent	Graham Hughes	305	0.7	New
Majority		32,908	72.9	+6.2
Turnout		45,163	69.0	+4.8
Labour Co-op hold		Swing	+2.2	

Paul Parr was also the Liberal Democrat candidate at both the 2010 and 2015 general elections, when he was known as Paul Twigger. Graham Hughes ran on an anti-Brexit platform as an independent in 2017, and subsequently joined the Liberal Democrats.

General election 2015: Liverpool West Derby
Party	Candidate	Votes	%	±%
Labour Co-op	Stephen Twigg	30,842	75.2	+11.1
UKIP	Neil Miney	3,475	8.5	+5.4
Conservative	Ed McRandal	2,710	6.6	―2.7
Liberal	Steve Radford	2,049	5.0	―4.3
Green	Rebecca Lawson	996	2.4	New
Liberal Democrats	Paul Twigger	959	2.3	―10.2
Majority		27,367	66.7	+16.1
Turnout		41,031	64.2	+7.5
Labour Co-op hold		Swing	―2.8	

General election 2010: Liverpool West Derby
Party	Candidate	Votes	%	±%
Labour Co-op	Stephen Twigg	22,953	64.1	+3.6
Liberal Democrats	Paul Twigger	4,486	12.5	―2.7
Liberal	Steve Radford	3,327	9.3	―2.5
Conservative	Pamela Hall	3,311	9.3	+1.1
UKIP	Hilary Jones	1,093	3.1	+1.1
Socialist Labour	Kai Anderson	614	1.7	―0.6
Majority		18,467	50.6	+6.3
Turnout		35,784	56.7	+11.0
Labour Co-op hold		Swing	+3.2	

=== Elections in the 2000s ===
General election 2005: Liverpool West Derby
Party	Candidate	Votes	%	±%
Labour	Robert Wareing	19,140	62.8	―3.4
Liberal Democrats	Patrick Moloney	3,915	12.9	+2.0
Liberal	Steve Radford	3,606	11.8	―3.1
Conservative	Peter Garrett	2,567	8.4	+0.4
Socialist Labour	Kai Anderson	698	2.3	New
UKIP	Peter Baden	538	1.8	New
Majority		15,225	49.9	―1.4
Turnout		30,464	47.2	+1.7
Labour hold		Swing	―2.7	

General election 2001: Liverpool West Derby
Party	Candidate	Votes	%	±%
Labour	Robert Wareing	20,454	66.2	―5.0
Liberal	Steve Radford	4,601	14.9	+5.3
Liberal Democrats	Patrick Moloney	3,366	10.9	+1.9
Conservative	William Clare	2,486	8.0	―0.7
Majority		15,853	51.3	―10.3
Turnout		30,907	45.5	―15.8
Labour hold		Swing	―5.0	

=== Elections in the 1990s ===
General election 1997: Liverpool West Derby
Party	Candidate	Votes	%	±%
Labour	Robert Wareing	30,002	71.2	+3.0
Liberal	Steve Radford	4,037	9.6	+7.0
Liberal Democrats	Ann Hines	3,805	9.0	―3.2
Conservative	Neil Morgan	3,656	8.7	―7.9
Referendum	Peter Forrest	657	1.6	New
Majority		25,965	61.6	+10.0
Turnout		42,157	61.3	―8.5
Labour hold		Swing	―2.0	

General election 1992: Liverpool West Derby
Party	Candidate	Votes	%	±%
Labour	Robert Wareing	27,014	68.2	+2.9
Conservative	Stephen Fitzsimmons	6,589	16.6	―2.6
Liberal Democrats	Gillian Bundred	4,838	12.2	―3.3
Liberal	Derek Curtis	1,021	2.6	New
Natural Law	Christopher Higgins	154	0.4	New
Majority		20,425	51.6	+5.5
Turnout		39,616	69.8	―3.6
Labour hold		Swing	+2.8	

=== Elections in the 1980s ===
General election 1987: Liverpool West Derby
Party	Candidate	Votes	%	±%
Labour	Robert Wareing	29,021	65.3	+10.8
Conservative	John Backhouse	8,525	19.2	−8.3
SDP	Malcolm Ferguson	6,897	15.5	−2.5
Majority		20,496	46.1	+19.1
Turnout		44,443	73.4	+3.9
Labour hold		Swing	+9.6	

General election 1983: Liverpool West Derby
Party	Candidate	Votes	%	±%
Labour	Robert Wareing	23,905	54.5	
Conservative	William M. Trelawney	12,062	27.5	
SDP	Eric Ogden	7,871	18.0	
Majority		11,843	27.0	
Turnout		43,838	69.5	
Labour hold		Swing		

=== Elections in the 1970s ===
General election 1979: Liverpool West Derby
Party	Candidate	Votes	%	±%
Labour	Eric Ogden	22,576	55.47	−5.01
Conservative	D P M Hudson	14,356	35.28	+6.40
Liberal	A Humphreys	3,765	9.25	−1.39
Majority		8,220	20.19	−11.41
Turnout		40,697		
Labour hold		Swing		

General election October 1974: Liverpool West Derby
Party	Candidate	Votes	%	±%
Labour	Eric Ogden	23,964	60.48	+5.8
Conservative	J Last	11,445	28.88	−1.8
Liberal	R Ousby	4,215	10.64	−3.1
Majority		12,519	31.60	+7.6
Turnout		39,624		
Labour hold		Swing		

General election February 1974: Liverpool West Derby
Party	Candidate	Votes	%	±%
Labour	Eric Ogden	22,689	54.68	−2.6
Conservative	J Last	12,716	30.65	−12.0
Liberal	P. Gilchrist	5,701	13.74	New
PEOPLE	D. Pascoe	388	0.94	New
Majority		9,973	24.0	+9.4
Turnout		41,494		
Labour hold		Swing		

General election 1970: Liverpool West Derby
Party	Candidate	Votes	%	±%
Labour	Eric Ogden	22,324	57.3	+0.44
Conservative	Michael Latham	16,619	42.7	−0.4
Majority		5,705	14.65	+0.88
Turnout		38,943		
Labour hold		Swing		

=== Elections in the 1960s ===
General election 1966: Liverpool West Derby
Party	Candidate	Votes	%	±%
Labour	Eric Ogden	19,988	56.9	+2.2
Conservative	Peter Rees	15,150	43.1	−2.2
Majority		4,838	13.8	+4.42
Turnout		35,138		
Labour hold		Swing		

General election 1964: Liverpool West Derby
Party	Candidate	Votes	%	±%
Labour	Eric Ogden	21,134	54.7	+8.66
Conservative	John Woollam	17,519	45.3	−8.66
Majority		3,615	9.35	N/A
Turnout		38,653		
Labour gain from Conservative		Swing		

=== Elections in the 1950s ===
General election 1959: Liverpool West Derby
Party	Candidate	Votes	%	±%
Conservative	John Woollam	22,719	54.0	+0.7
Labour	Aubrey Paxton	19,386	46.0	−0.7
Majority		3,333	7.9	+1.4
Turnout		42,105		
Conservative hold		Swing		

General election 1955: Liverpool West Derby
Party	Candidate	Votes	%	±%
Conservative	John Woollam	21,124	53.26	+1.65
Labour Co-op	Cyril Rawlett Fenton	18,540	46.74	−1.65
Majority		2,584	6.52	+3.30
Turnout		39,664		
Conservative hold		Swing		

Liverpool West Derby by-election, 1954
Party	Candidate	Votes	%	±%
Conservative	John Woollam	21,158	53.15	+1.54
Labour Co-op	Cyril Rawlett Fenton	18,650	46.85	−1.54
Majority		2,508	6.30	+3.08
Turnout		39,808	58.90	
Conservative hold		Swing		

General election 1951: Liverpool West Derby
Party	Candidate	Votes	%	±%
Conservative	David Maxwell Fyfe	27,441	51.61	
Labour	Lewis C. Edwards	25,734	48.39	
Majority		1,707	3.22	
Turnout		53,175	80.32	
Conservative hold		Swing		

General election 1950: Liverpool West Derby
Party	Candidate	Votes	%	±%
Conservative	David Maxwell Fyfe	27,449	51.92	−2.35
Labour	Bertie Kirby	25,417	48.08	−2.35
Majority		2,032	3.84	−4.70
Turnout		52,866		
Conservative hold		Swing		

=== Elections in the 1940s ===
General election 1945: Liverpool West Derby
Party	Candidate	Votes	%	±%
Conservative	David Maxwell Fyfe	21,798	54.27	
Labour Co-op	Dick Lewis	18,370	45.73	
Majority		3,428	8.54	
Turnout		40,168		
Conservative hold		Swing		

=== Elections in the 1930s ===
General election 1935: Liverpool West Derby
Party	Candidate	Votes	%	±%
Conservative	David Maxwell Fyfe	21,196	58.35	
Labour	James Haworth	10,218	28.13	
Liberal	Douglas Kilgour Mitchell	4,911	13.52	New
Majority		10,978	30.22	
Turnout		36,325	62.60	
Conservative hold		Swing		

1935 Liverpool West Derby by-election
Party	Candidate	Votes	%	±%
Conservative	David Maxwell Fyfe	Unopposed	N/A	N/A
Conservative hold		Swing		

General election 1931: Liverpool West Derby
Party	Candidate	Votes	%	±%
Conservative	John Sandeman Allen	32,202	78.01	
Labour	Joseph Cleary	9,077	21.99	
Majority		23,125	56.02	
Turnout		41,279	74.04	
Conservative hold		Swing		

=== Elections in the 1920s ===
General election 1929: Liverpool West Derby
Party	Candidate	Votes	%	±%
Unionist	John Sandeman Allen	16,794	42.7	−9.8
Labour	William Harvey Moore	14,124	36.0	+6.4
Liberal	Arthur Probyn Jones	8,368	21.3	+3.4
Majority		2,670	6.7	−16.2
Turnout		39,286	73.1	−4.1
Registered electors		53,745		
Unionist hold		Swing	−8.1	

General election 1924: Liverpool West Derby
Party	Candidate	Votes	%	±%
Unionist	John Sandeman Allen	15,667	52.5	+6.7
Labour	Thomas Gallon Adams	8,807	29.6	New
Liberal	Sydney Jones	5,321	17.9	−36.3
Majority		6,860	22.9	N/A
Turnout		29,795	77.2	+13.7
Registered electors		38,579		
Unionist gain from Liberal		Swing	+21.5	

General election 1923: Liverpool West Derby
Party	Candidate	Votes	%	±%
Liberal	Sydney Jones	12,942	54.2	New
Unionist	Reginald Hall	10,952	45.8	−24.7
Majority		1,990	8.4	N/A
Turnout		23,894	63.5	−1.5
Registered electors		37,618		
Liberal gain from Unionist		Swing		

General election 1922: Liverpool West Derby
Party	Candidate	Votes	%	±%
Unionist	Reginald Hall	16,179	70.5	+3.1
Labour	David Rowland Williams	6,785	29.5	−3.1
Majority		9,394	41.0	+6.2
Turnout		22,964	65.0	+9.9
Registered electors		35,330		
Unionist hold		Swing	+3.1	

=== Elections in the 1910s ===
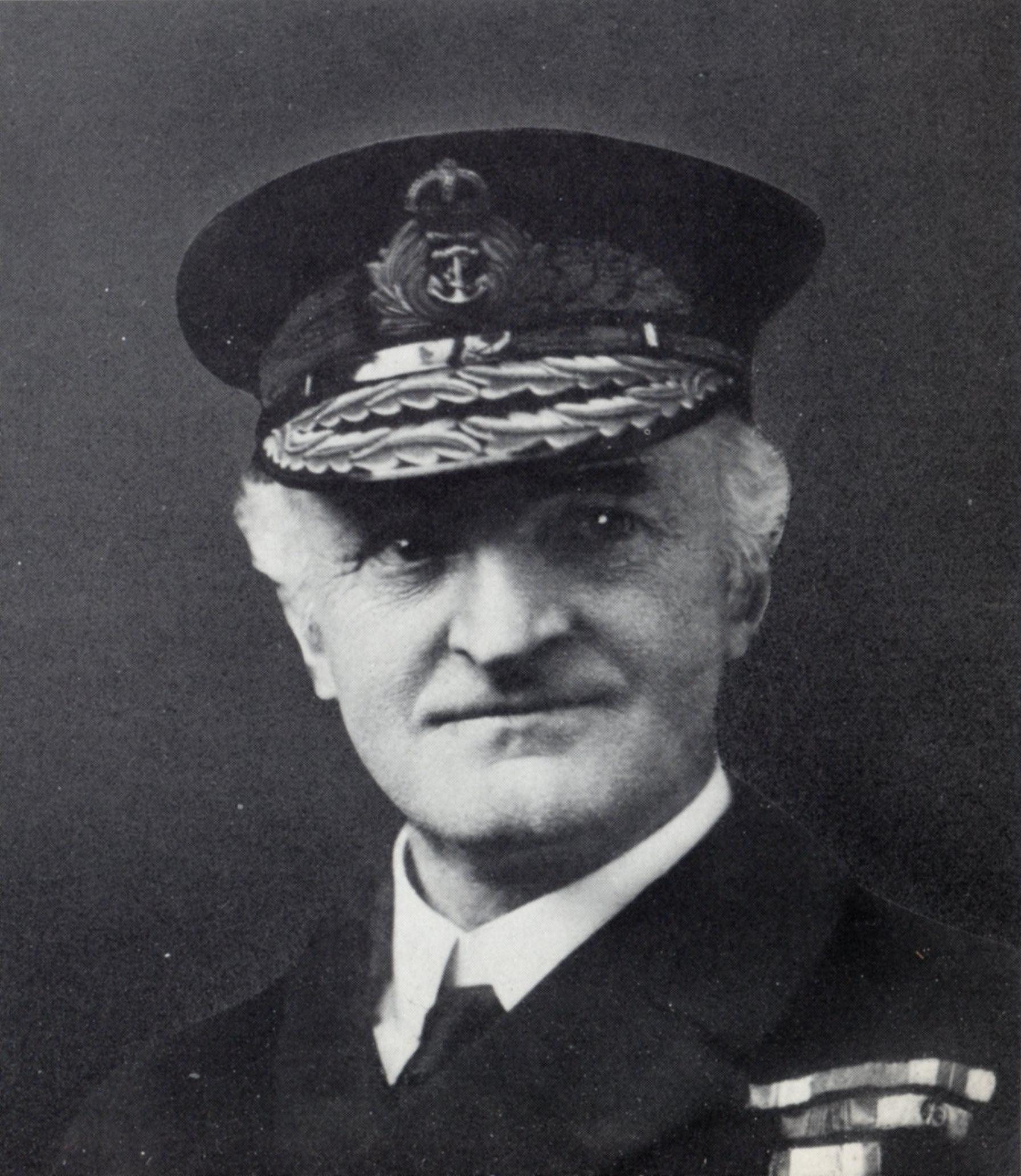
Hall

Liverpool West Derby by-election, 1919
Party		Candidate	Votes	%	±%
C	Unionist	William Reginald Hall	6,062	56.5	−10.9
	Labour	George Nelson	4,670	43.5	+10.9
Majority			1,392	13.0	−21.8
Turnout			10,732	34.3	−20.8
Registered electors			31,276		
	Unionist hold		Swing	−10.9	
C indicates candidate endorsed by the coalition government.

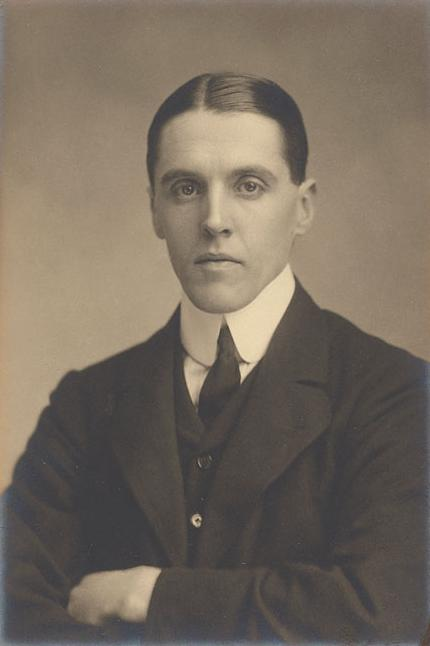
Smith

1918 general election: Liverpool West Derby
Party		Candidate	Votes	%	±%
C	Unionist	F. E. Smith	11,622	67.4	+4.9
	Labour	George Nelson	5,618	32.6	New
Majority			6,004	34.8	+9.8
Turnout			17,240	55.1	−13.4
Registered electors			31,276		
	Unionist hold		Swing		
C indicates candidate endorsed by the coalition government.

December 1910 general election: Liverpool West Derby
Party	Candidate	Votes	%	±%
Conservative	William Rutherford	4,908	62.5	+4.0
Liberal	William John Lias	2,943	37.5	−4.0
Majority		1,965	25.0	+8.0
Turnout		7,851	68.5	−8.9
Registered electors		11,467		
Conservative hold		Swing	+4.0	

January 1910 general election: Liverpool West Derby
Party	Candidate	Votes	%	±%
Conservative	William Rutherford	5,190	58.5	−1.7
Liberal	William John Lias	3,682	41.5	+1.7
Majority		1,508	17.0	−3.4
Turnout		8,872	77.4	+0.0
Registered electors		11,467		
Conservative hold		Swing	−1.7	

=== Elections in the 1900s ===
Holt

1906 general election: Liverpool West Derby
Party	Candidate	Votes	%	±%
Conservative	William Rutherford	5,447	60.2	N/A
Liberal	Richard Durning Holt	3,600	39.8	N/A
Majority		1,847	20.4	N/A
Turnout		9,047	77.4	N/A
Registered electors		11,692		
Conservative hold		Swing	N/A	

Liverpool West Derby by-election, 1903
Party	Candidate	Votes	%	±%
Conservative	William Rutherford	5,455	62.7	N/A
Liberal	Richard Durning Holt	3,251	37.3	New
Majority		2,204	25.4	N/A
Turnout		8,706	73.6	N/A
Registered electors		11,824		
Conservative hold		Swing	N/A	

1900 general election: Liverpool West Derby
Party	Candidate	Votes	%	±%
Conservative	Samuel Wasse Higginbottom	Unopposed		
Conservative hold				

=== Elections in the 1890s ===
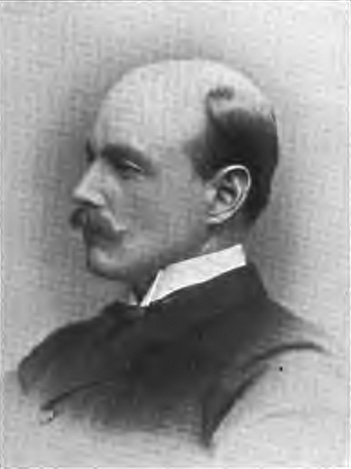
Long

1895 general election: Liverpool West Derby
Party	Candidate	Votes	%	±%
Conservative	Walter Long	4,622	73.3	+14.9
Liberal	Oscar Browning	1,686	26.7	−14.9
Majority		2,936	46.6	+29.8
Turnout		6,308	59.8	−10.7
Registered electors		10,556		
Conservative hold		Swing	+14.9	

Liverpool West Derby by-election, 1893
Party	Candidate	Votes	%	±%
Conservative	Walter Long	3,632	61.5	+3.1
Liberal	Daniel Shilton Collin	2,275	38.5	−3.1
Majority		1,357	23.0	+6.2
Turnout		5,907	58.5	−12.0
Registered electors		10,093		
Conservative hold		Swing	+3.1	

- Caused by Cross' death.

1892 general election: Liverpool West Derby
Party	Candidate	Votes	%	±%
Conservative	William Cross	4,107	58.4	−3.2
Liberal	Frederick R Smith	2,925	41.6	+3.2
Majority		1,182	16.8	−6.4
Turnout		7,032	70.5	+4.6
Registered electors		9,971		
Conservative hold		Swing	−3.2	

=== Elections in the 1880s ===
By-election, 10 August 1888: Liverpool West Derby
Party	Candidate	Votes	%	±%
Conservative	William Cross	Unopposed		
Conservative hold				

- Caused by Hamilton's resignation.

1886 general election: Liverpool West Derby
Party	Candidate	Votes	%	±%
Conservative	Claud Hamilton	3,604	61.6	+3.7
Liberal	Charles Hemphill	2,244	38.4	−3.7
Majority		1,360	23.2	+7.4
Turnout		5,848	65.9	−16.2
Registered electors		8,873		
Conservative hold		Swing	+3.7	

1885 general election: Liverpool West Derby
Party	Candidate	Votes	%	±%
Conservative	Claud Hamilton	4,213	57.9	
Liberal	Malcolm Guthrie	3,068	42.1	
Majority		1,145	15.8	
Turnout		7,281	82.1	
Registered electors		8,873		
Conservative win (new seat)				

== See also ==
- List of parliamentary constituencies in Merseyside

== Bibliography ==
- Dutton, D. J. (2004)"Fyfe, David Patrick Maxwell, Earl of Kilmuir (1900–1967)", Oxford Dictionary of National Biography, Oxford University Press, accessed 4 August 2007 (subscription, Wikipedia Library access or UK public library membership required)
- Tusa, A. & Tusa, J. (1983) The Nuremberg Trial (ISBN none: reprinted 2010, Skyhorse Publications ISBN 978-1616080211)
