= Page Moss =

Coordinates: 53.415°N 2.864°W

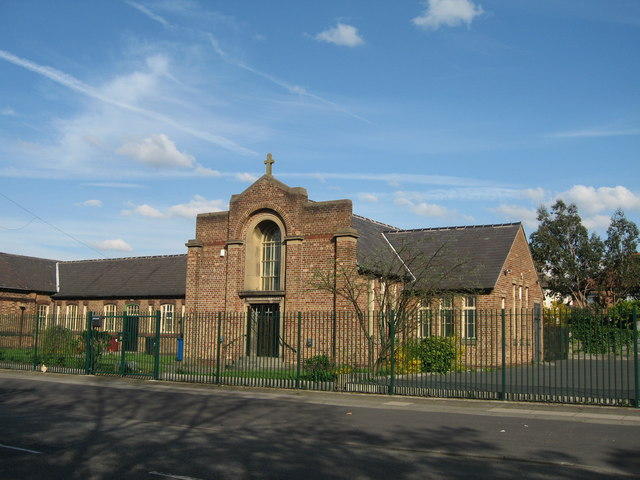
- Page Moss Lane Baptist Church

- Location within Merseyside
- Population: 7,076 (2011)
- Metropolitan borough: Knowsley
- Metropolitan county: Merseyside
- Region: North West
- Country: England
- Sovereign state: United Kingdom
- Post town: LIVERPOOL
- Postcode district: L14
- Dialling code: 0151
- Police: Merseyside
- Fire: Merseyside
- Ambulance: North West
- UK Parliament: Knowsley

Page Moss is an area in the borough of Knowsley, Merseyside. It borders the city of Liverpool to the east. Previously known as "The Horns" due to the crime and previous people using guns naming them horns. The population of the Knowsley ward taken at the 2011 census was 7,076.

The A57/Liverpool Road which passes through Page Moss was historically an early turnpike, toll houses were installed in 1706 on what later became well known public houses in the area such as "The Eagle and Child" and "The Bluebell Inn". Markers were placed at mile intervals along the toll road and an original still stands to this day alongside the eastbound side of Liverpool Road opposite the junction with Lyme Cross Road, previously a mile marker would be situated on the corner of Twig Lane but this has been missing since at least the 1930s when the Page Moss estate was constructed for housing.

On 30 June 2008 the neighbourhood was featured on the BBC TV documentary series Panorama, focusing upon the local youth gang culture, namely the "Moss Edz" and their feuds with adjoining areas, specifically Dovecot, whom they refer to as "Dovey Edz". The two areas are less than a mile apart.
