= George Nelson (trade unionist) =

British trade unionist and politician

George Nelson (6 December 1868 – 15 February 1929) was a British trade unionist and politician, based in Liverpool.

Born in Preston, Nelson grew up in Middlesbrough. He became a compositor in Liverpool and joined the Typographical Association, becoming secretary of its large local branch. He joined the Fabian Society in 1892, and was later elected as president of Liverpool Trades Council, and vice-president of the local labour advisory board. From 1907, he was the trades council's representative on the municipal education committee. He was known for wearing a frock coat and, for many years, a silk hat, unusual clothing for a working man of the period.

Nelson became active in the Labour Party, and was elected to Liverpool City Council, representing the Low Hill ward. He sought the sponsorship of his union to contest a seat at the 1918 United Kingdom general election, but when it held a vote to decide whom to sponsor, he won the first round, but narrowly lost a run-off to Frederick Roberts. Despite this, he managed to secure the sponsorship of the Liverpool West Derby Constituency Labour Party and so contested the election there. His campaign meetings were lively affairs, with his wife singing "The Toilers", and he engaged in much personal criticism of his opponent, F. E. Smith. Smith responded in kind, describing Nelson as "this Lenin in a silk hat". He lost heavily, but stood again when a by-election arose the following year, when he increased his vote share to 43.5%.

On 15 February 1929, Nelson was found dead at his union office, his death being determined a suicide by gassing himself.
