= Middle Class Union =

The Middle Classes Union was founded in February 1919 to safeguard property after the Reform Act 1918 had increased the number of working-class people eligible to vote. Sir George Ranken Askwith and Conservative MP and Irish landowner J. R. Pretyman Newman were both members.

== Development ==
Lord Robert Cecil described the MCU as a strike-breaking body designed to encourage "the smaller trading, propertied and professional classes [to] band themselves together to protect their interests ... and secure their property ... from revolution and extreme Labour demands".

The group saw the middle classes being squeezed by not only a growing labour movement but also by a government that was taking on an increasing role in economic life and banded together with the aim of protecting middle-class interests against both potential enemies. Its main pre-occupation was its opposition to socialism and in particular strike action, although it also became associated with the policies of eugenics and sterilisation programmes as a means to reduce the population and as a result reduce poverty. In opposing high taxation to pay for social reform the Union pre-empted the policies of the Anti-Waste League, a party formed in 1921 from a similar middle-class basis which briefly threatened the hegemony of the Conservative Party on the political right.

George Ranken Askwith did not found the Middle Class Union. He became the president when it was re-organised under the name the National Citizen's Union in 1921 and attempted to attract a wider membership. The Times (6 March 1919) gives no mention of his name or that of his wife at the founding meeting in 1919. John Pretyman Newman was one of the founders and became its first chairman, a position he resigned when he was elected vice-president on 9 July 1922. Speaking at the meeting when the MCU was relaunched as the National Citizens Union in 1921 Askwith rather pointedly said "the Union supported the maintenance of representative government and would oppose direct action for political purposes" (The Times, 19 December 1921). Clearly the re-launch of the MCU under a new name had entailed some hard thinking on the part of its council.

== National Citizens Union ==
It changed its name to the National Citizens Union in 1921 and under this name became associated with the emerging strand of British fascism. Pretyman Newman had spoken of his admiration for the ideology while Charles Rosdew Burn and Robert Burton-Chadwick both maintained dual membership of the Union and the British Fascists (as well as the Conservative Party, for which both men sat as MPs). In 1927 the group even appointed as its chairman Colonel A. H. Lane, a man well known for his work with the strongly anti-Semitic Britons. By the late 1930s the group was closely associated with the Militant Christian Patriots, a minor group known for its anti-Semitism and fascist sympathies. It disappeared around the outbreak of the Second World War.

== See also ==
- People's Union for Economy
