= William Cross (politician) =

British politician (1856–1892)

The Honourable William Henry Cross (22 August 1856 – 11 December 1892) was a British Conservative politician.

== Life ==
Cross was the eldest son of R. A. Cross, 1st Viscount Cross, by Georgiana, daughter of Thomas Lyon, DL, of Appleton Hall, Cheshire. He was educated at Rugby School, and matriculated at University College, Oxford in 1875, graduating B.A. in 1879. He was called to the bar at the Inner Temple in 1882, and became a special pleader.

In 1888 Cross was returned to parliament for Liverpool West Derby in 1888, a seat he held until his death four years later. He died in December 1892, aged 36, predeceasing his father by 22 years.

== Family ==
Cross married Mary, daughter of William Lewthwaite, of Broadgate House near Millom, Cumberland, in 1880; Broadgate House was on the other side of River Duddon from Eccle Riggs, the Cross family home. They had one son, the future Richard Assheton Cross, 2nd Viscount Cross, and four daughters.

Mary Cross survived her husband by over 50 years and died in November 1946. Her brother became Sir William Lewthwaite, 1st Baronet in 1927. That year, known as the Hon. Mrs. W. H. Cross, she was living at Ash House, near Broughton-in-Furness, with her four unmarried daughters.

Parliament of the United Kingdom
Preceded by Lord Claud Hamilton	Member of Parliament for Liverpool West Derby; 1888–1892	Succeeded by Walter Long
