= Alexander Gordon, 7th Marquess of Aberdeen and Temair =

Scottish peer (1955–2020)

The Most Honourable The Marquess of Aberdeen and Temair DL
- Born: Alexander George Gordon; 31 March 1955; Ashampstead, Berkshire
- Died: 12 March 2020 (aged 64); Haddo, Aberdeenshire
- Spouse: Joanna Clodagh (m. 1981)
- Issue: George Gordon, 8th Marquess of Aberdeen and Temair; Lord Sam Gordon; Lady Anna Gordon; Lord Charles Gordon
- Parents: Alastair Gordon, 6th Marquess of Aberdeen and Temair

Alexander George Gordon, 7th Marquess of Aberdeen and Temair, DL (31 March 1955 – 12 March 2020), styled Earl of Haddo from 1984 to 2002, was a Scottish peer, businessman, and landowner.

== Early life and education ==
Gordon was born at Quicks Green, Ashampstead, Berkshire, the only son of Alastair Gordon, a botanical artist, and Anne Barry. In 1965, his paternal grandfather, Lord Dudley Gordon (second son of John Hamilton-Gordon, 1st Marquess of Aberdeen and Temair and his wife, Ishbel), succeeded his childless elder brother, George, in the family titles.

He was educated at Cothill House, Abingdon, and at Harrow School, where he played cricket. He played rugby union for London Scottish F.C. in the 1970s.

== Career and peerage ==
Alexander Gordon's father, Alastair, who was the youngest of four sons, did not expect he would ever inherit the titles; however, his two older brothers, the fourth and fifth marquesses, failed to produce heirs, and the third was killed in the Second World War. In 1984, he succeeded as the sixth marquess, at which point Alexander became styled as the Earl of Haddo as heir apparent.

After Harrow, Gordon intended to study land management at the Polytechnic of Central London, but through an application error ended up in a quantity surveying course, which he enjoyed. He worked first as a surveyor and then joined the property developer Speyhawk. In 1986, he moved to the London & Edinburgh Trust, where he was managing director of its largest subsidiary, Letinvest.

In 1995, Gordon moved to Aberdeenshire near the family seat, Haddo House, which was built in 1732 by the architect William Adam on land held by the Gordons since the mid-15th century. Haddo was given to the National Trust for Scotland in 1979, five years after the death of the fourth marquess. Gordon built a new family house, called House of Formartine, in one end of Haddo's listed walled garden.

According to The Times, "He followed a remarkable line of lairds of Haddo, who for two centuries had combined improvements to their estates with forward-looking and generous ways of helping local people." The Gordon estates had extended to some 75,000 acres in the beginning of the 20th century, but had diminished greatly by the 1990s. Gordon returned the estate to prosperity and built high-quality affordable houses. His investment also created jobs, most visibly at Formartine's farm shop and restaurant which he, his wife and John Cooper, a local businessman, built on the edge of the estate.

Gordon was appointed a Deputy Lieutenant of Aberdeenshire in 1998.

He succeeded his father in 2002 in the family titles: Marquess of Aberdeen and Temair; Earl of Aberdeen; Earl of Haddo; Viscount Formartine; Viscount Gordon; Lord Haddo, Methlick, Tarves and Kellie; and a baronet.

== Marriage and issue ==
In 1981, Gordon married Joanna Clodagh Houldsworth, granddaughter of Sir Henry Walter Houldsworth. They had four children:

- George Ian Alastair Gordon, 8th Marquess of Aberdeen and Temair (born 4 May 1983). He married Isabelle Coaten.
- Lord Sam Dudley Gordon (born 25 October 1985). Lord Sam is married to Isobel Tatham. They have one son and one daughter:
  - Bertie Raiph Dudley Gordon (born 30 August 2016)
  - Lara Sophie Bebe Gordon (born 21 September 2018)
- Lady Anna Katherine Gordon (born 2 September 1988). Lady Anna is married to Sarah McChesney (born 1987) in 2017.
- Lord Charles David Gordon (born 8 June 1996)

He died of cancer in 2020 at House of Formartine, on the Haddo House estate.

The Dowager Marchioness is a patron of Haddo House Choral and Operatic Society.

== Arms ==
Coat of arms of Alexander Gordon, 7th Marquess of Aberdeen and Temair
Crest Two arms holding a bow and arrow straight upwards in a shooting posture and at full draught all proper. Escutcheon Azure, three boars’ heads couped or armed proper and langued gules within a double tressure flowered and counter-flowered interchangeably with thistles, roses, and fleurs-de-lys of the second. Supporters Dexter, an Earl, and sinister, a Doctor of Laws, both habited in their robes proper. Motto Fortuna sequatur (Let fortune follow).

Peerage of the United Kingdom
Preceded by Alastair Gordon	Marquess of Aberdeen and Temair; 2002–2020	Succeeded by George Gordon
