= Edward Alfred Cockayne =

English pediatrician

Edward Alfred Cockayne OBE FRCP (3 October 1880 – 28 November 1956) was an English physician specializing in pediatrics. He spent most of his medical career at Great Ormond Street Hospital for Sick Children in London.

== Early life and education ==
Cockayne was born in Sheffield, the only surviving child of Edward Shepherd Cockayne (1836–1889), a successful draper in Sheffield, and Mary Florence (née Clixby), a farmer's daughter from Lincolnshire. Cockayne's father died before his 10th birthday, but left a considerable sum of more than £31,000 (equivalent to £3,444,000 in 2025).

He was educated at Charterhouse School and Balliol College, Oxford, taking first-class honours in the Natural Science School in 1903. He was awarded the Brackenbury scholarship to St Bartholomew's Hospital Medical School, graduating B.M. B.Ch. degrees in 1907 and D.M. in 1912.

In 1906, his widowed mother, 49, shocked British society when she married his 27-year-old Balliol College classmate George Gordon, Lord Haddo, heir to John Hamilton-Gordon, 7th Earl of Aberdeen, who was at that time Lord Lieutenant of Ireland and former Governor General of Canada. After Hamilton-Gordon (who was created Marquess of Aberdeen and Temair in 1916) died in 1934, Cockayne's mother was Marchioness of Aberdeen until her own death three years later.

== Career ==
Cockayne worked at the Middlesex Hospital and at the hospital for children on Great Ormond Street from 1934. He was particularly interested in endocrinology, and rare, genetic diseases of children. In 1946, he recognized a disease that would be named after him, called Cockayne's syndrome. This is a rare multisystem disorder characterized by dwarfism, pigmentary retinopathy, impaired nervous system development, and facial abnormalities.

This disease has since been divided into three subtypes:

- Cockayne syndrome I, or Classic Cockayne Syndrome: in which facial and somatic abnormalities develop during childhood. Due to progressive neurological degeneration, death occurs in the second or third decade.
- Cockayne syndrome II, or Severe Cockayne Syndrome: in which facial and somatic abnormalities are present at birth. Death usually results by the age of seven.
- Cockayne syndrome III: milder than Cockayne I & II, and its onset happens later than the other two types.

In 1933, he published the Inherited Abnormalities of the Skin and its Appendages. This was the first book that dealt exclusively with genodermatoses (inherited skin disorders).

Besides his medical work, Cockayne was an entomologist and spent more time on it after his retirement in 1945, living at the Oasis in Tring. He amassed a large collection of butterflies and moths, which in 1947 was donated to the Walter Rothschild Zoological Museum at Tring, Hertfordshire. The collection which included those of Bernard Kettlewell had nearly 50000 specimens. Cockayne is also credited with influencing Kettlewell in the study of population genetics.

== Honours ==
In 1909, Cockayne became a Member of the Royal College of Physicians (MRCP) in 1909 and a Fellow (FRCP) in 1916.

In 1943, he became president of the Royal Entomological Society of London.

Cockayne was appointed an Officer of the Order of the British Empire in the 1954 Birthday Honours for services to entomology.

== Death ==
Cockayne died in 1956 at Tring, Hertfordshire. His remains were interred at Haddo House, the seat of his stepfather.
