= Lady Aberdeen =

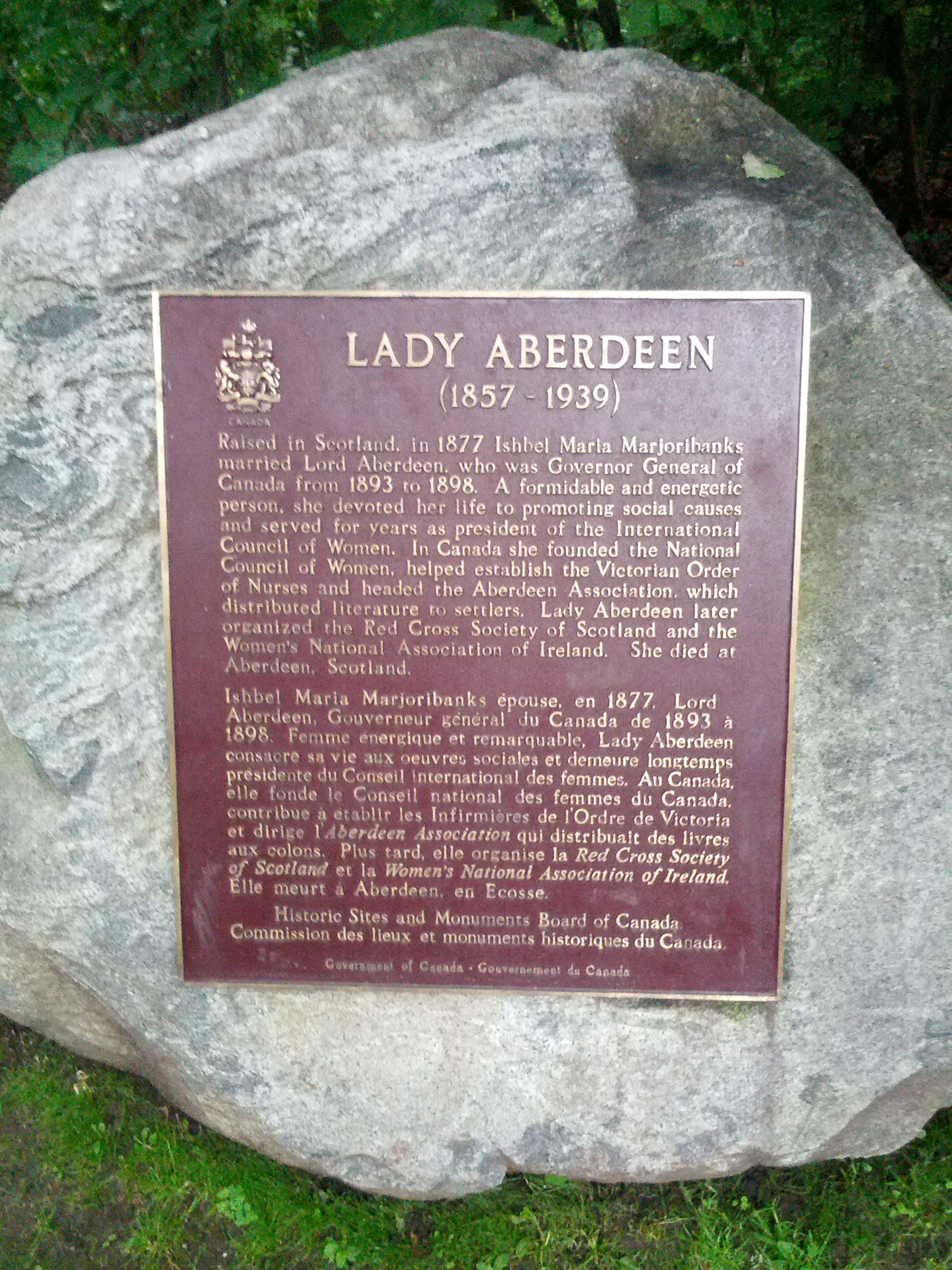
Sign about Marchioness of Aberdeen and Temair, or Lady Aberdeen.

Lady Aberdeen refers to the Marchioness of Aberdeen and Temair, by right or marriage. Notable Marchionesses have included:

- Ishbel Hamilton-Gordon, Marchioness of Aberdeen and Temair (1857–1939), women's rights activist and wife of John Hamilton-Gordon, 1st Marquess of Aberdeen and Temair
- June Gordon, Marchioness of Aberdeen and Temair (1913–2009), musician and wife of David Gordon, 4th Marquess of Aberdeen and Temair
