= Ronald Watkins =

English drama teacher and director

- Born: Arthur Ronald Dare Watkins; 29 August 1904; Kingston Hill, Surrey, England
- Died: 16 February 2001 (aged 96)
- Occupations: School teacher, Shakespeare scholar
- Spouse: Margaret Watson Brown (m. 1948)

Arthur Ronald Dare Watkins OBE (29 August 1904 – 16 February 2001) was a teacher of drama and a director, noted for his work on Shakespeare and was appointed an Officer of the Order of the British Empire in 1996. Throughout his long career, in stage productions, lectures, and writings, Watkins argued for the primacy of language in Shakespeare's plays and attempted to discover and replicate how Shakespeare himself staged and produced the plays.

Watkins was born in Kingston Hill, Surrey, the youngest of his parents' seven recorded children. He was educated at Eton and King's College, Cambridge, where he arrived as a scholar and gained a first-class degree in Classics. After a period working as a "reader" at the BBC, he joined the staff of Harrow School in 1932, teaching English and Classics. In 1948 he married Margaret "Bunty" Watson Brown.

In 1940, a German bomb severely damaged the Harrow Speech Room. When Watkins produced his first Shakespeare play – Twelfth Night—at Harrow School in 1941, the damaged stage lacked a proscenium curtain and stage lighting. Watkins turned these problems to his advantage, realising that the minimalist conditions of his stage were similar to those of Shakespeare's own theatre. Inspired by the work of John Cranford Adams, Watkins gradually transformed the Harrow Speech Room into an approximation of an Elizabethan stage. The Shakespeare productions became an annual tradition at Harrow, and between 1941 and 1964, Watkins staged 21 plays. One of those whose performances he directed was Robin Butler, who after playing the Duke of Kent in a schoolboy production of King Lear in 1956, went on to achieve wider fame as the United Kingdom's top civil servant. In 1952 some of Watkins' former student actors formed the Old Harrovian Players, and this alumni company returned each year to present its own Shakespeare play at Harrow.

In 1962, Watkins's friends David and June Gordon (Lord and Lady Aberdeen) invited him to direct a Shakespeare play at Haddo House, their country estate in Aberdeen, Scotland. The concert hall at Haddo House was converted into an Elizabethan stage, and Watkins put on a Shakespeare production there in alternate years from 1962 to 1970.

Watkins retired from his teaching post at Harrow in 1964 and embarked on a 20-year career as a travelling lecturer, touring Europe, the United States, and Canada to promote "The Cause." In 1965 and 1967 he was visiting professor at the University of Colorado at Boulder, where he directed a production of King Lear (1967) and received an honorary doctorate (1976). Watkins donated his library and personal papers to Wake Forest University in 1999. A celebratory event commemorating this gift was held in October 1999, and a Shakespeare in Education symposium took place at Wake Forest in August 2000. His association with Wake Forest began in the 1960s when the university was a stop on his North American speaking tours.

Watkins's publications include Moonlight at the Globe (Michael Joseph, 1946) and On Producing Shakespeare (Michael Joseph, 1950; reprinted by Benjamin Blom, 1964). He also co-authored, with Jeremy Lemmon, the series in Shakespeare's Playhouse. Watkins donated the manuscript of his final work, Why Not Ask Shakespeare? (Winston-Salem, NC: Stratford Books, 2002), to Wake Forest. The manuscript was edited by Professor Don Wolfe of Wake Forest University and published posthumously.

Watkins was an ardent supporter of Sam Wanamaker's project of reconstructing Shakespeare's Globe Theatre near its original site in London. He played the double bass and was a keen watercolourist. Ronald Watkins was appointed an Officer of the Order of the British Empire in 1996 "for services to the Globe." Watkins died in 2001, at the age of 96.

== Books ==
- Watkins, Ronald (1946). Moonlight at the Globe. London : Michael Joseph.
- Watkins, Ronald (1950). On Producing Shakespeare. London : Michael Joseph.
- Watkins, Ronald (2002). Why Not Ask Shakespeare?. Winston-Salem, NC : Stratford Books.
