= Archibald Gordon, 5th Marquess of Aberdeen and Temair =

English broadcaster and author (1913–1984)

The Most Honourable The Marquess of Aberdeen and Temair
- Born: Archibald Victor Dudley Gordon; 9 July 1913; Bexley, Kent, England
- Died: 7 September 1984 (aged 71); Stowmarket, Suffolk, England
- Education: Harrow School
- Occupations: Writer, broadcaster
- Parents: Dudley Gordon, 3rd Marquess of Aberdeen and Temair; Cécile Drummond

Archibald Victor Dudley Gordon, 5th Marquess of Aberdeen and Temair (9 July 1913 – 7 September 1984), styled Lord Archibald Gordon from 1965 to 1974, was an English broadcaster, author and Scottish peer. He produced The Week in Westminster on BBC radio from 1946–66.

== Early life and education ==
Gordon was born at Bourne Place, Bexley, Kent, the second son of Hon. Dudley Gordon and Cécile Elizabeth, daughter of George James Drummond. He was baptised at the Bexley parish church at six week old; Queen Mary was his godmother.

In 1916, his grandfather John Hamilton-Gordon, 7th Earl of Aberdeen was elevated to the Marquess of Aberdeen and Temair. From that point his father was styled Lord Dudley Gordon until he succeeded his elder brother as 3rd Marquess of Aberdeen and Temair in 1965.

Gordon was educated at Harrow School.

== Career ==
Gordon was an assistant secretary with the Council for the Protection of Rural England, 1936–1940. He joined the BBC Monitoring Service in 1940. From 1946 to 1972, he worked for the BBC Radio Talks Department. He produced The Week in Westminster as well as party political and election broadcasts between 1946 and 1966. He was head of Radio Talks and Documentaries from 1967 to 1972.

On the death of his elder brother on 13 September 1974, he succeeded him as Marquess of Aberdeen and Temair, as well as inheriting his brother's other titles.

== Personal life ==
Lord Aberdeen and Temair never married and resided with his valet in Suffolk. At the suggestion of family friend Roy Palmer of Haughley, he came to live at The Grainge in Haughley until his death in 1984 in a hospital near Stowmarket.

He was buried at the family seat at Haddo House. He was succeeded in the marquessate, and his other titles, by his younger brother Lord Alastair Gordon.

== Arms ==
Coat of arms of Archibald Gordon, 5th Marquess of Aberdeen and Temair
Crest Two arms holding a bow and arrow straight upwards in a shooting posture and at full draught all proper. Escutcheon Azure, three boars’ heads couped or armed proper and langued gules within a double tressure flowered and counter-flowered interchangeably with thistles, roses, and fleurs-de-lys of the second. Supporters Dexter, an Earl, and sinister, a Doctor of Laws, both habited in their robes proper. Motto Fortuna sequatur (Let fortune follow).

Peerage of the United Kingdom
Preceded by David Gordon	Marquess of Aberdeen and Temair; 1974–1984	Succeeded by Alastair Gordon
