= Alastair Gordon, 6th Marquess of Aberdeen and Temair =

British peer and artist

The Most Honourable The Marquess of Aberdeen and Temair
- Born: Hon. Alastair Ninian John Gordon; 20 July 1920; Paddington, London
- Died: 19 August 2002 (aged 82)
- Education: Harrow School; Gray's School of Art; Camberwell School of Art
- Occupations: Botanical artist, art critic
- Spouse: Anne Barry
- Children: Lady Emma Foale; Alexander Gordon, 7th Marquess of Aberdeen and Temair; Lady Sophia Gordon
- Parents: Dudley Gordon, 3rd Marquess of Aberdeen and Temair; Cécile Drummond
- Military career
- Allegiance: United Kingdom
- Branch: British Army
- Service years: 1939–1946
- Rank: Captain
- Unit: Scots Guards
- Conflicts: Second World War: North Africa Campaign; Italian Campaign; North West Europe Campaign

Alastair Ninian John Gordon, 6th Marquess of Aberdeen and Temair (20 July 1920 – 19 August 2002), styled Lord Alastair Gordon from 1965–84, was a British botanical artist and art critic who succeeded to a peerage later in life.

== Early life and World War II ==
Gordon was born at 17 Norfolk Crescent, Paddington, London, the youngest of five children and the fourth son of Lord Dudley Gordon and his wife, Cécile Drummond. He was raised in Kent and attended Harrow before entering Gray's School of Art. Commissioned into the Scots Guards in 1939, he served in the Middle East and North Africa before being invalided to Syria after an Irish Guardsman accidentally shot him in the shoulder. Returning to active service, he fought in Italy and North-West Europe before being demobilized as a staff captain in 1946. After leaving the services, he and fellow veteran and nobleman Earl Haig enrolled at the Camberwell School of Art.

== Career as artist ==
It was at Camberwell that Gordon began to specialize in botanical paintings. Several exhibitions of his art would be held in London, New York, Chicago, and Sydney. Gordon was also a member of the International Association of Art Critics and the modern art correspondent for Connoisseur magazine in the 1960s. It was at this time (1965) that his father inherited the Marquessate and Alastair became Lord Alastair Gordon.

Gordon settled at Ashampstead, Berkshire, far from his ancestral home at Haddo, allowing him to enjoy the company of artistic, rather than country, society. Aside from his art, he also enjoyed a longtime role as an amateur singer in the Bach Choir.

== Later life ==
Inheriting the marquessate after the death of his brother in 1984, he sat as a crossbencher in the House of Lords. He attended the Lords only sparingly to speak on topics of interest to him. In his last year of life, he frequently wrote letters and columns on art criticism and other subjects for newspapers. However, he was best known for magazine and other pieces describing his experiences in the brothels of Knightsbridge and Beirut, an activity regarded by his wife with "tolerant amusement."

== Personal life ==
In 1950, Aberdeen married the ceramic sculptor Anne Barry, daughter of Black Watch Lieutenant-Colonel Gerald Barry, MC, of Great Witchingham, Norfolk, sometime Deputy Military Secretary of the Eastern Army of India, and Lady Margaret, daughter of Jacob Pleydell-Bouverie, 6th Earl of Radnor.

They had two daughters and a son:

- Lady Emma Cecile Gordon (b. 26 May 1953), married firstly Dr. Rodney Foale, and secondly John Dewe Mathews
- Alexander George Gordon, 7th Marquess of Aberdeen and Temair (31 March 1955 – 12 March 2020)
- Lady Sophia Katherine Gordon (20 July 1960 – 28 December 2005)

== Arms ==
Coat of arms of Alastair Gordon, 6th Marquess of Aberdeen and Temair
Crest Two arms holding a bow and arrow straight upwards in a shooting posture and at full draught all proper. Escutcheon Azure, three boars’ heads couped or armed proper and langued gules within a double tressure flowered and counter-flowered interchangeably with thistles, roses, and fleurs-de-lys of the second. Supporters Dexter, an Earl, and sinister, a Doctor of Laws, both habited in their robes proper. Motto Fortuna sequatur (Let fortune follow).

Peerage of the United Kingdom
Preceded by Archibald Gordon	Marquess of Aberdeen and Temair; 1984–2002	Succeeded by Alexander Gordon
