= George Gordon, 2nd Marquess of Aberdeen and Temair =

British peer and politician

The Most Honourable The Marquess of Aberdeen and Temair OBE KStJ JP
- The Marquess in 1953
- Born: George Gordon, Lord Haddo; 20 January 1879; Grosvenor Square, London, England, U.K.
- Died: 6 January 1965 (aged 85)
- Education: Harrow School; St Andrews University; Balliol College, Oxford
- Occupation: Politician
- Political party: Progressive
- Spouses: Mary Florence Cockayne (m. 1906; died 1937) Anna Forbes (m. 1940; died 1949)
- Parents: John Hamilton-Gordon, 1st Marquess of Aberdeen and Temair; Ishbel Hamilton-Gordon, Marchioness of Aberdeen and Temair

Lord Lieutenant of Aberdeenshire
- In office 1934–1959
- Preceded by: The Marquess of Aberdeen and Temair
- Succeeded by: Sir Ian Forbes-Leith

George Gordon, 2nd Marquess of Aberdeen and Temair OBE KStJ JP (20 January 1879 – 6 January 1965), styled Lord Haddo until 1916 and Earl of Haddo from 1916–34, was a Scottish peer and politician. He was Lord Lieutenant of Aberdeenshire from 1934–59.

== Early life and education ==
Aberdeen was born in 1879 at 37 Grosvenor Square, London, the eldest son of the 7th Earl of Aberdeen (elevated to the Marquess of Aberdeen and Temair in 1916) and his wife, Ishbel, daughter of Baron Tweedmouth. Upon the news that an heir to the earldom had been born, villagers celebrated around Aberdeenshire. The cannon fired regularly at the earl's seat, Haddo House north of Aberdeen, while a bonfire was held at Tarland, and church bells rang and fireworks were set off in the village of Methlick.

He was educated at Harrow, St Andrews University, and Balliol College, Oxford.

== Career ==
Aberdeen was a Progressive member of the London County Council for Peckham from 1910 to 1925 and for Fulham West from 1931 to 1934. He was also Chairman of the Charity Organization Society from 1934 to 1937 and Lord-Lieutenant of Aberdeenshire between 1934 and 1965. Aberdeen was invested as an Officer of the Order of the British Empire (OBE) in 1920, as a Knight of the Order of St John (KStJ) in 1949, and was awarded an honorary doctorate of Laws from the University of Aberdeen in 1954.

== Marriages ==
On 6 August 1906, the 27-year-old Lord Haddo "horrified his family" by marrying 49-year-old Mary Florence Cockayne (née Clixby), the daughter of a Lincolnshire farmer and the widow of a Sheffield draper. Cockayne was the mother of the noted physician Edward Alfred Cockayne, his classmate at Balliol College.

After her death in 1937, he married, secondly, Anna Orrok Stronach Sheila Innes, on 21 December 1940. She was the widow of Capt. James William Guy Innes of Raemoir CBE and the daughter of Lt.-Col. John Foster Forbes of Rothiemay. His stepson by this marriage was Sir Berowald Innes of Balvenie, 16th Bt. She died in 1949. There were no children of either marriage.

Lord Aberdeen and Temair died in January 1965, aged 85, and was succeeded in the titles by his younger brother, Dudley.

== Arms ==
Coat of arms of George Gordon, 2nd Marquess of Aberdeen and Temair
Crest Two arms holding a bow and arrow straight upwards in a shooting posture and at full draught all proper. Escutcheon Azure, three boars’ heads couped or armed proper and langued gules within a double tressure flowered and counter-flowered interchangeably with thistles, roses, and fleurs-de-lys of the second. Supporters Dexter, an Earl, and sinister, a Doctor of Laws, both habited in their robes proper. Motto Fortuna sequatur (Let fortune follow).

Honorary titles
Preceded by The Marquess of Aberdeen and Temair	Lord Lieutenant of Aberdeenshire; 1934–1959	Succeeded by Sir Ian Forbes-Leith
Peerage of the United Kingdom
Preceded by John Hamilton-Gordon	Marquess of Aberdeen and Temair; 1934–1965	Succeeded by Dudley Gordon
