= Marjorie Sinclair, Baroness Pentland =

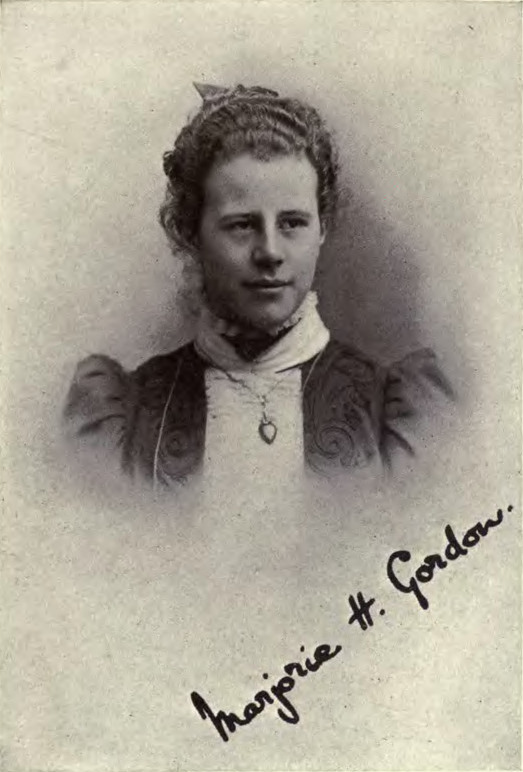
- Born: 7 December 1880
- Died: 26 July 1970 (aged 89)
- Occupation: Editor
- Spouse(s): John Sinclair, 1st Baron Pentland
- Children: Henry Sinclair, 2nd Baron Pentland, Margaret Ishbel Sinclair
- Parent(s): John Hamilton-Gordon, 1st Marquess of Aberdeen and Temair; Ishbel Hamilton-Gordon, Marchioness of Aberdeen and Temair
- Titles: lady

Marjorie Adeline Gordon Sinclair, Baroness Pentland DBE, DStJ (7 December 1880 – 26 July 1970) was the daughter of Sir John Campbell Hamilton-Gordon, 1st Marquess of Aberdeen and Temair and Ishbel Hamilton-Gordon, Marchioness of Aberdeen and Temair.

She was educated, mainly, by private tuition. She accompanied her parents to Canada, on the appointment of her father as Governor-General, in 1893. As a child, she founded and edited Wee Willie Winkie, a periodical for the young. She was interested in Canadian history, and assisted her parents and took part in the "Tableaux Historiques" given by them in Montreal, Quebec, the historical fancy dress ball given at Ottawa, Ontario, and the Victorian Era ball given at Toronto, Ontario. She was the first "May Queen" elected to preside over the May Court Club at Ottawa, which she helped found.

After returning to England, she wrote a dramatized version, in five acts, of Scott's Fortunes of Nigel, and lectured. Her coming out ball was held at Haddo House on 12 September 1899. She made her debut in London society at a ball given by her parents in Grosvenor Street, June 1901. She was presented at Court shortly thereafter. In April 1903 her name was announced as a candidate for the School Board at Methlick, Aberdeenshire.

She married John Sinclair, 1st Baron Pentland (b. 7 July 1860 – d. 11 January 1925) on 12 July 1904; they had two children:

- Henry John Sinclair, 2nd and last Lord Pentland (1907–1984)
- Hon. Margaret Ishbel Sinclair (1906–1976)

Travelling in India with her husband in 1914, she visited Travancore, where Beatrice A. Vieyra dedicated to her a cookbook, Culinary Art Sparklets. She was invested as a Dame Commander of the Order of the British Empire (DBE) in 1917. She was also invested as a Dame of Grace, Order of St. John of Jerusalem (D.G.St.J.).

A great advocate for better housing for the people of the UK, for many years she was a friend of Anne Muriel Lupton (1888–1967), who, like Pentland, was a vice-chairman of the London Housing Centre. Pentland's mother was also interested in the social issue of housing, supporting the work of both her daughter and Lupton.

In 1884, her parents hosted a dinner at Haddo House honouring William Ewart Gladstone who, at that time, was Prime Minister of the United Kingdom. Artist Alfred Edward Emslie captured the event in a painting which, in 1953, Pentland presented to the National Portrait Gallery, London.

King George VI and his wife Queen Elizabeth reportedly "sent a message of sympathy to Lady Pentland" when her mother died on 18 April 1939.

Marjorie Sinclair, Baroness Pentland died on 26 July 1970, aged 89.
