= Dudley Gordon, 3rd Marquess of Aberdeen and Temair =

British peer, soldier, and industrialist (1883-1972)

The Most Honourable The Marquess of Aberdeen and Temair DSO
- The Marquess in 1969.
- Born: Lord Dudley Gladstone Gordon; 6 May 1883
- Died: 16 April 1972 (aged 88)
- Education: Harrow School University of Aberdeen
- Occupations: Soldier, industrialist
- Spouses: Cécile Drummond; Margaret Munn
- Children: David Gordon, 4th Marquess of Aberdeen and Temair; Lady Jessamine Harmsworth; Archibald Gordon, 5th Marquess of Aberdeen and Temair; Captain Lord Michael Gordon; Alastair Gordon, 6th Marquess of Aberdeen and Temair
- Parents: John Hamilton-Gordon, 1st Marquess of Aberdeen and Temair; Hon. Isabel Marjoribanks

Marquess of Aberdeen and Temair
- In office 1965–1972
- Preceded by: George Gordon
- Succeeded by: David Gordon

Military service
- Allegiance: United Kingdom
- Branch/service: British Army
- Rank: Lieutenant Colonel
- Unit: Gordon Highlanders
- Commands: 8/10th Battalion
- Awards: Companion of the Distinguished Service Order

Lieutenant-Colonel Dudley Gladstone Gordon, 3rd Marquess of Aberdeen and Temair DSO (6 May 1883 – 16 April 1972), styled Lord Dudley Gordon from 1916 to 1965, was a British peer, soldier, and industrialist.

== Early life and family ==
Aberdeen was the second son of John Hamilton-Gordon, 1st Marquess of Aberdeen and Temair, and his wife Ishbel, daughter of Dudley Marjoribanks, 1st Baron Tweedmouth. He attended Harrow School and was awarded an honorary doctorate of Law from the University of Aberdeen.

== Military service ==
He was commissioned a second lieutenant in the 8th Battalion of the Gordon Highlanders in 1914. He was shortly thereafter transferred to the 9th Battalion as a temporary captain, and was later promoted to temporary major. In 1917, he was appointed a Companion of the Distinguished Service Order for gallantry in supervising the construction of two artillery tracks under enemy fire. He later gained the rank of Lieutenant-Colonel and served as commander of the 8/10th Battalion from 1917 to 1919.

== Career ==
He worked for J. and E. Hall Ltd (an engineering company based in Dartford, Kent) from 1907 and became a director in 1910.

Aberdeen was President of the British Association for Refrigeration from 1926 to 1929, President of the British Engineers Association from 1936 to 1939, and President of the Federation of British Industries between 1940 and 1943, as well as serving as President of the Institution of Mechanical Engineers.

Aberdeen was a founding member and President (between 1921 and 1931) of Gravesend Rugby Football Club, originally known as Darenth RFC.

== Family ==
Lord Aberdeen and Temair married, firstly, Cécile Elizabeth Drummond (7 August 1878 – 17 September 1948), daughter of George James Drummond, on 25 April 1907. They had five children:

- David George Ian Alexander Gordon, 4th Marquess of Aberdeen and Temair (21 January 1908 – 13 September 1974)
- Lady Jessamine Cécile Marjorie Gordon (14 August 1910 – 14 December 1994), married Michael Harmsworth and had issue.
- Archibald Victor Dudley Gordon, 5th Marquess of Aberdeen and Temair (9 July 1913 – 7 September 1984)
- Captain Michael James Andrew Gordon (22 May 1918 – 8 October 1943)
- Alastair Ninian John Gordon, 6th Marquess of Aberdeen and Temair (20 July 1920 – 19 August 2002)

He married, secondly, Margaret Gladys Munn (died 22 November 1990) on 17 June 1949.

== Arms ==
Coat of arms of Dudley Gordon, 3rd Marquess of Aberdeen and Temair
Crest Two arms holding a bow and arrow straight upwards in a shooting posture and at full draught all proper. Escutcheon Azure, three boars’ heads couped or armed proper and langued gules within a double tressure flowered and counter-flowered interchangeably with thistles, roses, and fleurs-de-lys of the second. Supporters Dexter, an Earl, and sinister, a Doctor of Laws, both habited in their robes proper. Motto Fortuna sequatur (Let fortune follow).

Peerage of the United Kingdom
Preceded by George Gordon	Marquess of Aberdeen and Temair; 1965–1972	Succeeded by David Gordon
Professional and academic associations
Preceded by Oliver Vaughan Snell Bulleid	President of the Institution of Mechanical Engineers; 1947	Succeeded by E. William Gregson
