= June Gordon, Marchioness of Aberdeen and Temair =

English pianist and conductor

The Most Honourable The Marchioness of Aberdeen and Temair GCStJ CBE DL FRCM FRSAMD FRSE
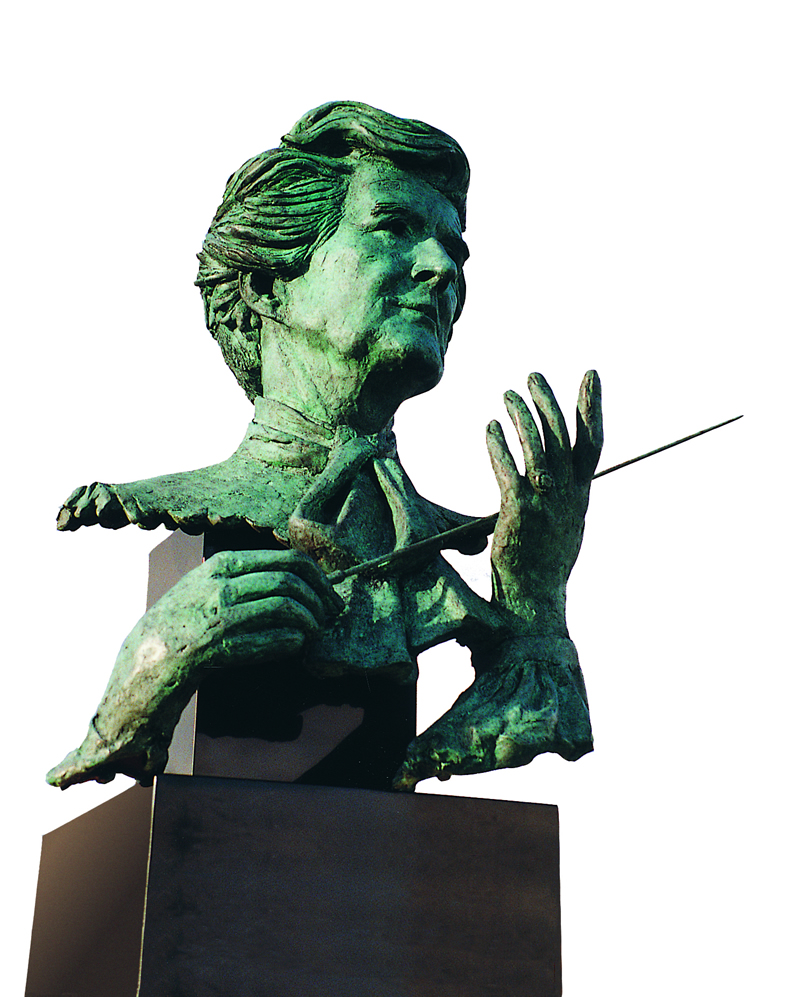
- Born: Beatrice Mary June Boissier; 29 December 1913; Isle of Wight
- Died: 22 June 2009 (aged 95)
- Other name: June Gordon
- Education: Harrow School; Royal College of Music
- Occupation: Musician
- Spouse: David Gordon, 4th Marquess of Aberdeen and Temair
- Children: Lady Mary Welfare; Lady Sarah Gordon; Lord Andrew Gordon; Lord James Gordon
- Parents: Paul Boissier; Dorothy Smith

Beatrice Mary June Gordon, Marchioness of Aberdeen and Temair, CBE, GCStJ, DL, FRSE, FRCM, FRSAMD (née Boissier; 29 December 1913 – 22 June 2009), commonly known as Lady Aberdeen, was a professional musician and patron of the Aberdeen International Youth Festival and founder and musical director of Haddo House Choral & Operatic Society.

== Biography ==
She was born in 1913 on the Isle of Wight to Arthur Paul Boissier and Dorothy Christina Leslie, daughter of Rev. Clement Smith, rector of Whippingham and canon of Windsor. Trained as a pianist and conductor, she met David Gordon, 4th Marquess of Aberdeen and Temair at Harrow School where her father was Headmaster. They married on 29 April 1939, and lived at Haddo House, Ellon, Aberdeenshire, home of the Gordon family. They adopted four children who were, until 2004, not entitled to either courtesy titles or for the elder son to inherit the peerage:

- Lady Mary Katherine Gordon (b. 30 May 1946), married Simon Piers Welfare and had issue.
- Lady Sarah Caroline Gordon (b. 25 March 1948), married Mr. P. Scott and had issue; then remarried Eric N Money with one son.
- Lord Andrew David Gordon (b. 6 March 1950), married Lucy Mary Frances Milligan and had issue.
- Lord James Drummond Gordon (b. 11 April 1953), married Marilyn Sim

Until 2004, adopted children of peers had no right to any courtesy title. However, as a result of a Royal Warrant dated 30 April 2004 adopted children are now automatically entitled to such styles and courtesy titles as their siblings. However, as with illegitimate children where legitimated, such children have no rights to inheritance of peerages, although Scottish peerages rules of descent differ.

They established the Haddo House Choral & Operatic Society in 1945 to provide cultural opportunities for the residents of Aberdeenshire. Haddo House is located in a setting that includes gardens, a park, and a lake, and features a theatre known as Haddo House Hall, which was originally constructed as a tennis court and is now used for theatrical performances and concerts. The estate serves as a venue for various events, including concerts and operas. It is located 20 miles north of Aberdeen and is currently managed by the National Trust for Scotland.

Known professionally as June Gordon, a graduate of the Royal College of Music, Lady Aberdeen was a pianist and conductor by training and she developed Haddo's musical programme with great enterprise. The first recorded concert was a Christmas Carol service in Haddo House Chapel in 1945, which still occurs annually. Under June's baton, the society widened its repertoire developing a tradition for presenting major British works – both Operas and concerts. She started with directing Handel's 'Messiah' with soloist Elsie Suddaby in 1947 and other highlights have included 1950's Bach's 'St Matthew Passion' with oboist Leon Goosens in a solo role and major choral works by Elgar, Delius, Tippett, Vaughan Williams and Howells and many operas which require chorus.

A succession of internationally renowned artists have helped make this North East Scotland venue a lively stage for the very best in choral, operatic and drama productions: Dame Janet Baker was asked to perform there immediately on graduating from the Royal College of Music because Lady Aberdeen thought her "promising". Glasgow-born Rosalind Sutherland first performed Desdemona in Verdi's opera Otello at Haddo in 1996, and returned as Micaela in Carmen in 1997, before finding fame taking the title role in 'Madame Butterfly' at the San Francisco Opera House. Judith Lovat, now with the Philadelphia Opera, gained early experience at Haddo. Other eminent musicians to appear have included: Benjamin Britten, Ralph Vaughan Williams, Willard White, Sarah Walker, and Neil Mackie. In recent years there have been visiting performers from France, Finland, Denmark, Germany and the USA. For many years a Summer Play was also produced, using the renowned Globe Stage in the Hall for Shakespeare one year and presenting another playwright's work the next, but this has recently been discontinued. As a young man, Prince Edward appeared several times in these productions.

Many young people who have grown up in the area have performed at Haddo and gone on to study music and the performing arts at the tertiary level. Students from the Royal Scottish Academy of Music and Drama take part in the opera every year, gaining invaluable experience in the orchestra, chorus and/or taking small singing roles. The Society is now 65 years old and presents an annual programme of opera, oratorio and carols. Professional pianist and singing teacher Alice E Dennis GTCL trains the chorus. HHCOS prides itself on its high standard of performance, achieved by the local community working alongside the professional artists brought in for producing and designing the opera, for the major solo roles and for playing in the orchestra for the opera and concerts alike. The facilities at Haddo comprise a purpose built rehearsal room, and the theatre known as "Haddo House Hall" for performances. The Choral Society also uses the tiny and picturesque Chapel, attached to the side of the main House for their popular carol concerts. These venues are a delight for both artists and their audiences. The umbrella organisation at Haddo house; the "Haddo User Group" involves over 200 members of all ages and backgrounds, who take part in a wide range of productions including the opera, large choral concerts and carol concerts. There are also musical shows from Haddo Youth Music Theatre and the Haddo Children's Theatre and youth concerts involving the two award-winning Haddo Youth and Children's Choirs. She was President of the RSCDS (Royal Scottish Country Dance Society) Aberdeen Branch until her death.

== Death and legacy ==
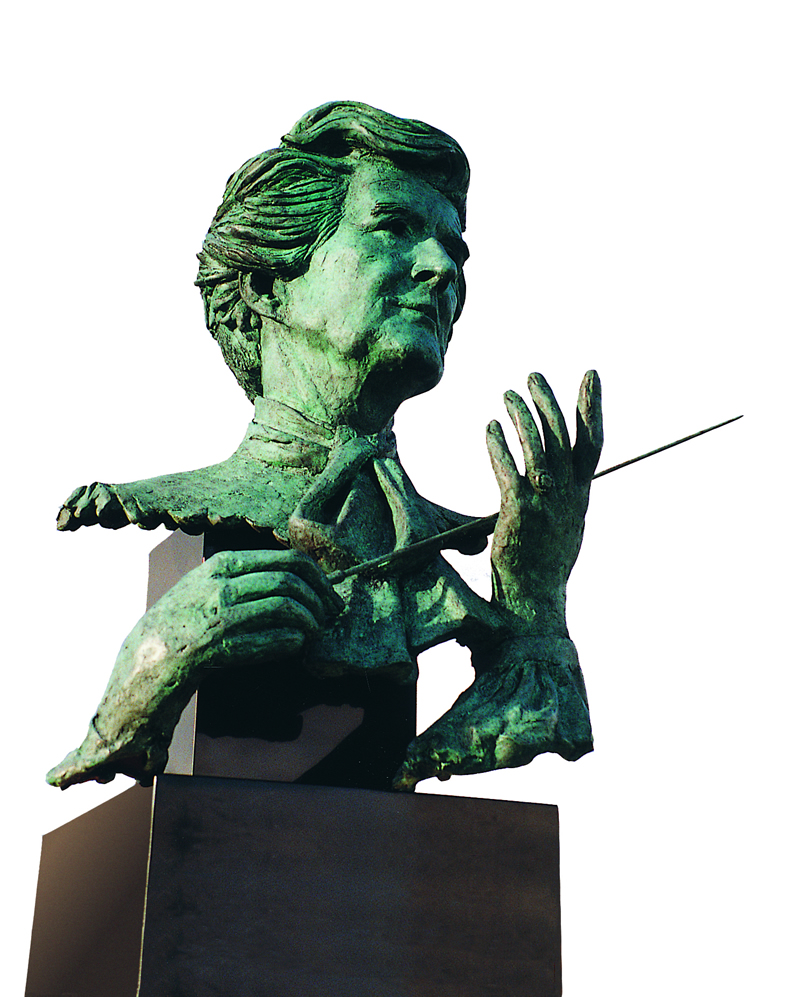
The sculpture of June Gordon, Marchioness of Aberdeen and Temair, by Laurence Broderick

Lady Aberdeen was a Patron of leading Scottish learning disabilities charity Cornerstone Community Care, and Chairman of the North East of Scotland Music School. She received the MBE in 1971 and CBE in 1989. She died in June 2009, aged 95.

A sculpture of June Gordon, Marchioness of Aberdeen and Temair, was commissioned from Laurence Broderick.
