= Baron Stanmore =

Extinct barony in the Peerage of the United Kingdom

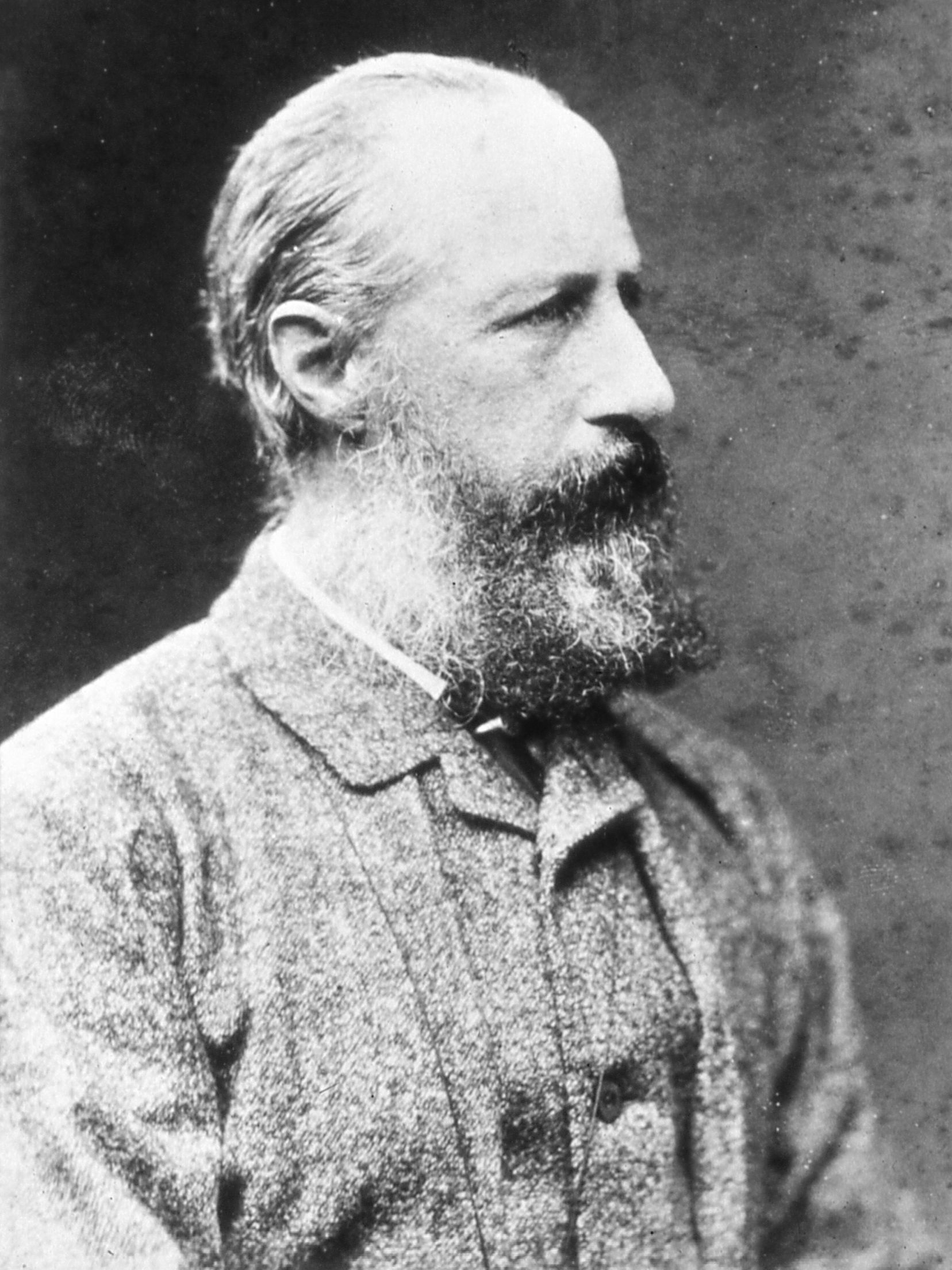
Arthur Hamilton-Gordon, 1st Baron Stanmore.

Baron Stanmore, of Great Stanmore in the County of Middlesex, was a title in the Peerage of the United Kingdom. It was created in 1893 for the colonial administrator the Hon. Sir Arthur Hamilton-Gordon. He was the youngest son of the former Prime Minister George Hamilton-Gordon, 4th Earl of Aberdeen (see Marquess of Aberdeen and Temair for earlier history of the family). His only son, the second Baron, served as a Government Whip from 1914 to 1922 and as Chief Liberal Whip in the House of Lords from 1923 to 1944. However, Lord Stanmore never married and the title became extinct on his death in 1957.

== Barons Stanmore (1893) ==
- Arthur Charles Hamilton-Gordon, 1st Baron Stanmore (1829–1912)
- George Arthur Maurice Hamilton-Gordon, 2nd Baron Stanmore (1871–1957)

== See also ==
- Marquess of Aberdeen and Temair
