= Paul Boissier =

English civil servant and cricketer (1881–1953)

Arthur Paul Boissier (25 January 1881 – 2 October 1953) was an English schoolmaster who was headmaster of Harrow School, and a wartime civil servant. He was a cricketer who played first-class cricket for Derbyshire County Cricket Club in 1901 and 1906.

== Life ==
Boissier was born at Bloxham, Oxfordshire, the son of the Rev. Frederick Scobell Boissier, M.A., who was then curate of neighbouring Deddington as well as a teacher at Bloxham School. The Boissier family were minor gentry with a strong tradition of clerical service, descended from Gaspard Boissier (c. 1640–1705), of Geneva.

Boissier was educated at St. John's School, Leatherhead. His father became vicar of St Mary the Virgin's Church, Denby in 1900 and in 1901 Boissier made his first-class debut for Derbyshire against Marylebone Cricket Club (MCC). He went to Oxford University where he played football against Cambridge University in 1904. He also played cricket for Oxfordshire in 1903. In 1906 he played again for Derbyshire against Essex. He played four innings in two first-class matches to make a total of six runs. He bowled six overs to take two first-class wickets for 32 runs.

From 1905 to 1919 Boissier was a master at the Royal Naval College, Osborne, on the Isle of Wight. In November 1939 he was elected headmaster of Harrow School, where he had been employed as an assistant master specializing in Mathematics since 1919. In 1942 he became Director of Public Relations at the Ministry of Fuel and Power.

Boissier married Dorothy Christina Leslie, daughter of Rev. Clement Smith, rector of Whippingham and canon of Windsor, on the Isle of Wight in 1909. Their daughter Beatrice Mary June Boissier married David Gordon, 4th Marquess of Aberdeen and Temair, an Old Harrovian, in 1939.

Boissier died at Stockethill, Aberdeen, Scotland, in 1953.

Academic offices
Preceded by Paul Cairn Vellacott	Head Master of Harrow School; 1940–1942	Succeeded by Ralph Westwood Moore
