= David Gordon, 4th Marquess of Aberdeen and Temair =

The Most Honourable The Marquess of Aberdeen and Temair CBE KStJ
- Born: Lord David George Ian Alexander Gordon; 21 January 1908
- Died: 13 September 1974 (aged 66)
- Education: Harrow School; Balliol College, Oxford
- Occupations: Peer, soldier
- Spouse: Beatrice Mary June Boissier
- Children: Lady Mary Welfare; Lady Sarah Gordon; Lord Andrew Gordon; Lord James Gordon
- Parents: Dudley Gordon, 3rd Marquess of Aberdeen and Temair; Cécile Elizabeth Drummond

Marquess of Aberdeen and Temair
- In office 1972–1974
- Preceded by: Dudley Gordon
- Succeeded by: Archibald Gordon

Military service
- Allegiance: United Kingdom
- Branch/service: British Army
- Rank: Major
- Unit: Gordon Highlanders (5th/7th Battalion)
- Battles/wars: World War II

Major David George Ian Alexander Gordon, 4th Marquess of Aberdeen and Temair CBE KStJ (21 January 1908 – 13 September 1974) was a British peer, soldier, and the son of Dudley Gordon, 3rd Marquess of Aberdeen and Temair.

== Life ==
Gordon attended Harrow School and graduated from Balliol College, Oxford, in 1930 with a Bachelor of Arts, then with a Masters in 1968. He attained the rank of Major in the service of the 5th/7th Battalion of the Gordon Highlanders and fought in the Second World War.

He became Deputy Lieutenant of Aberdeenshire in 1949, Vice-Lieutenant of Aberdeenshire in 1959, and Lord-Lieutenant of Aberdeenshire in 1973. He was also a County Councillor for Aberdeenshire in 1950 and justice of the peace for Aberdeenshire in 1955.

He was admitted to Royal Company of Archers in 1955 and invested as a Commander of the Order of the British Empire in 1963. He was invested as a Knight of the Order of St John in 1964 and was a director of Northern Area Clydesdale Bank in 1968.

== Family ==
On 29 April 1939, he married Beatrice Mary June Boissier, the daughter of Arthur Boissier, Headmaster of Harrow School (1939–1942). They had four (adopted) children:

- Lady Mary Katherine Gordon (b. 30 May 1946), married Simon Piers Welfare and had issue.
- Lady Sarah Caroline Gordon (b. 25 March 1948), married Patrick John Raleigh Scott and had issue.
- Lord Andrew David Gordon (b. 6 March 1950), married Lucy Mary Frances Milligan and had issue.
- Lord James Drummond Gordon (b. 11 April 1953), married Marilyn Sim.

Until 2004, adopted children of peers had no right to any courtesy title. However, as a result of a Royal Warrant dated 30 April 2004, adopted children are now automatically entitled to such styles and courtesy titles as their siblings. Therefore, on that date, Gordon's children automatically become lords and ladies.

== Arms ==
Coat of arms of David Gordon, 4th Marquess of Aberdeen and Temair
Crest Two arms holding a bow and arrow straight upwards in a shooting posture and at full draught all proper. Escutcheon Azure, three boars’ heads couped or armed proper and langued gules within a double tressure flowered and counter-flowered interchangeably with thistles, roses, and fleurs-de-lys of the second. Supporters Dexter, an Earl, and sinister, a Doctor of Laws, both habited in their robes proper. Motto Fortuna sequatur (Let fortune follow).

Honorary titles
Preceded by Sir Ian Forbes-Leith, Bt	Lord Lieutenant of Aberdeenshire; 1973–1974	Succeeded by Sir Maitland Mackie
Peerage of the United Kingdom
Preceded by Dudley Gordon	Marquess of Aberdeen and Temair; 1972–1974	Succeeded by Archibald Gordon
