= George Hamilton-Gordon, 6th Earl of Aberdeen =

George Hamilton-Gordon, 6th Earl of Aberdeen (10 December 1841 – 27 January 1870), styled Lord Haddo from 1860 to 1864, was a Scottish peer and sailor.

Hamilton-Gordon settled for a time in Richmond, Maine, where he took jobs cutting ice and clerking at a store (where it is reported he lost his temper at being fired and told his employer that he "could buy and sell him many times over" before storming out). As a sailor, he often shipped out of Richmond, and at one time captained a small ship called the Walton (or Waltham). His profession was not entirely a mystery to his family at home, as he wrote letters to his mother and brother on occasion.

Travelling from Boston to Melbourne on the Hera in 1870, Lord Aberdeen was washed overboard during a violent storm and drowned. It was reported he was swept away when attempting to take down the boom sail, which he could have ordered another man to do. His younger brother had been killed in a rifle accident two years earlier, so Aberdeen was succeeded by his next younger brother, John, who went on to become Governor-General of Canada from 1893 to 1898 and Lord Lieutenant of Ireland in 1896 and again from 1905 to 1915.

== Arms ==
Coat of arms of George Hamilton-Gordon, 6th Earl of Aberdeen
Notes These supporters were granted to the 4th earl (as Viscount Gordon) and his successors in 1818 in place of the ancient supporters Dexter: A senator of the College of Justice and Sinister: A minister of state, each in his robes of office. Crest Dexter, Two arms, from the shoulder, naked, holding a bow proper, to let an arrow fly (Gordon); Sinister, Out of a ducal coronet or, an oak tree, the stem cut transversely by a frame saw, the blade inscribed with the word "through", all proper (Hamilton). Escutcheon Quarterly, 1st and 4th, Azure, three boars' heads couped within a double tressure flowered and counter-flowered with roses, thistles and fleurs-de-lys or (Gordon); 2nd & 3rd, Quarterly, first and fourth, gules, three cinquefoils pierced ermine, second and third, Argent, an ancient ship with sails furled sable the whole within a bordure of the last (Hamilton). Supporters Two antelopes argent, armed and unguled or, each gorged with a collar flory counterflory azure, charged with three roses or, and line reflexed over the back azure. Motto Fortuna sequatur (Let fortune follow). Alternatively: Ne Ninium (Not too much)

Peerage of Scotland
Preceded by George Hamilton-Gordon	Earl of Aberdeen; 1864–1870	Succeeded by John Hamilton-Gordon
