= George Hamilton-Gordon, 2nd Baron Stanmore =

British Liberal politician

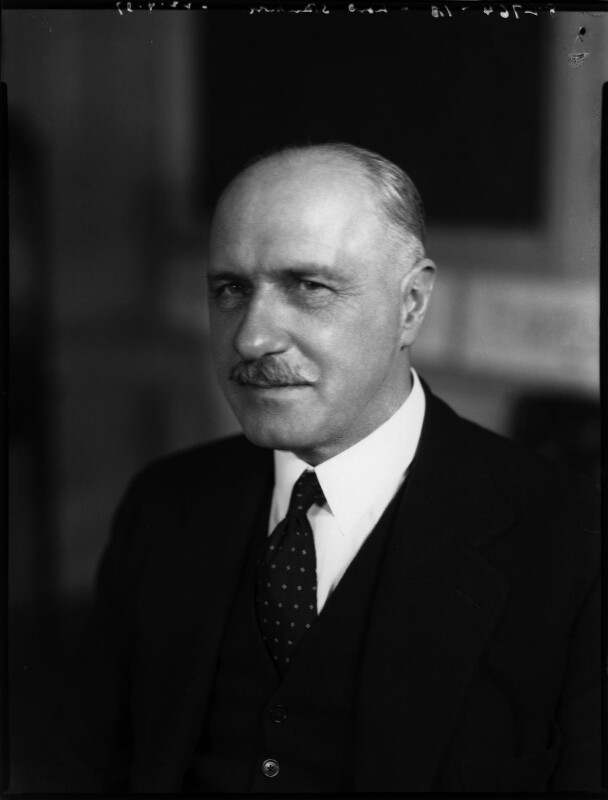
Lord Stanmore

George Arthur Maurice Hamilton-Gordon, 2nd Baron Stanmore KCVO PC (3 January 1871 – 13 April 1957), was a British Liberal politician.

== Biography ==
Stanmore was the only son of Arthur Hamilton-Gordon, 1st Baron Stanmore, youngest son of Prime Minister George Hamilton-Gordon, 4th Earl of Aberdeen. His mother was Rachel Emily, daughter of Sir John George Shaw-Lefevre. He was educated at Winchester and Trinity College, Cambridge.

He served from 1892 to 1895 as private secretary to successively the First Commissioner of Works and the President of the Local Government Board (both offices were held by his uncle George Shaw-Lefevre).

Hamilton-Gordon was enlisted with the Hampshire Regiment, but in January 1902 transferred to be captain of the 3rd Battalion, the Gordon Highlanders.

After succeeding his father in the barony in 1912 Stanmore served as a Lord-in-waiting (government whip in the House of Lords) under H. H. Asquith and then David Lloyd George from 1914 to 1922. He never returned to the government but was Chief Liberal Whip in the House of Lords from 1923 to 1944 and served as a Deputy Speaker of the House of Lords. From 1921 to 1937 he was also Treasurer of St Bartholomew's Hospital. He was made a CVO in the 1922 Birthday Honours and a KCVO in the 1930 Birthday Honours and was sworn of the Privy Council following the 1932 Birthday Honours.

The Lord Stanmore died in April 1957, aged 86. He never married and the title became extinct on his death. He gets a mention in historian Michael Bloch's book Closet Queens as a "homosexual bachelor."

Peerage of the United Kingdom
Preceded by Arthur Hamilton-Gordon	Baron Stanmore; 1912–1957	Extinct
