= Raemoir House =

Historic mansion house in Aberdeenshire, Scotland

Coordinates: 57°05′08″N 2°30′18″W

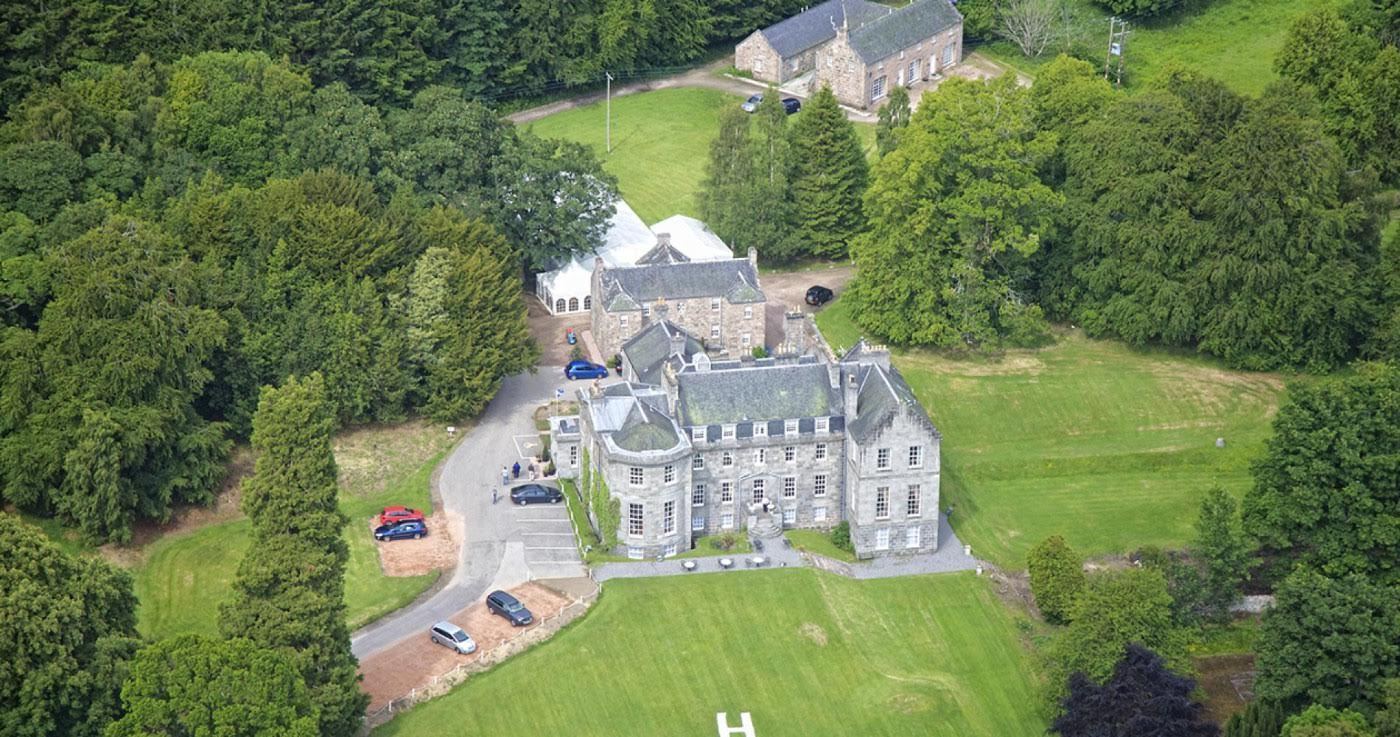
Raemoir House, Banchory.

Raemoir House is a Category B listed Georgian mansion house located in Banchory, Aberdeenshire, Scotland. Its origins date back to the Ha'Hoose (Hall House) which was built in 1715 during the Georgian Era. Raemoir changed hands a number of times and remained a private residence until 1943, when it became a hotel . Over the centuries Raemoir has been renovated a number of times. The prominent architect John Smith even contributed to Raemoir's present appearance. Today Raemoir House is run by Neil and Julie Rae, who acquired the property in 2010 and ran it as a hotel and events venue for some years. Since 2017, Raemoir House has been an exclusive use venue for weddings, events and house parties.

== History ==
=== The Ha'Hoose and early history ===
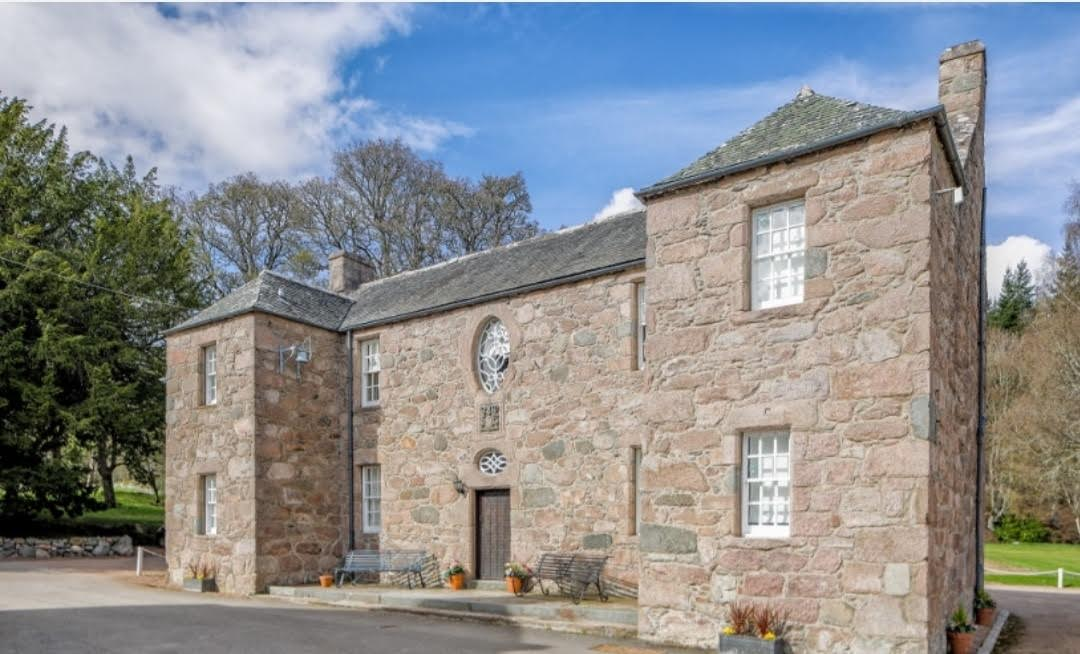
The Ha'Hoose

The Ha'Hoose was constructed in 1690 for the Hogg family although the Ha'Hoose could date as far back to c1530. when James V granted the lands that included the current site of Raemoir. The Hoggs may have gained the land due to the marriage of James Hogg and Margaret Skene (daughter of Robert Skene of Raemoir). The Ha'Hoose is also featured on the Roy Military Map 1747–55.

==== The Battle of Corrichie ====
The Battle of Corrichie took place on October 28, 1562, between the forces of Mary Queen of Scots and George Gordon, 4th Earl of Huntly. The Earl of Huntly rebelled against Mary and she marched to Aberdeen to put the rebellion down. The rebels were soundly defeated and the Earl of Huntly died of apoplexy in captivity.

This battle took place only a couple of miles from Raemoir and today a landmark, a rock from which Mary was said to have watched the battle at a safe distance, known as the Queen's Chair marks the site and although it has deteriorated over the years it is still there to this day.

The Ha'Hoose fell out of use as a main residence when the far larger and grander Raemoir House construction started in the early 1800's. It is now used as annexe accommodation to the main house and possibly the only, if not one of a few, functional Ha' Hoose's in Scotland.

=== Raemoir House ===
The word Raemoir comes from the Scottish Gaelic words 'Reidh' which means flat land and 'Moir' which means long. The house itself was built in 1817 and extended in 1844 by John Smith. Smith's commissioned alterations included the creation of the west wing of the house. Smith is well known for his use of Classical architecture which can be observed at Raemoir today as well as in Aberdeenshire more widely.

Smith's work in Aberdeen was so seminal that it is still referred to as 'The Granite City' in honour of Smith's contributions to its buildings, bridges and Churches.

After Smith, Dr William Kelly undertook extensive work on the house including the creation of the dining room and the kitchen beneath in 1923 for the Cowdray Family, who he had an extensive working relationship with. Although by this time he was an old man, he continued to consult on the renovations of Raemoir House as well as Dunecht House until his death in 1944.

Due to financial issues, James Hogg eventually lost ownership of Raemoir House and the Innes family then took ownership until they sold it to the Cowdrays in 1921.

==== The Innes Family ====
In 1816 William Innes purchased Raemoir from the Hogg family after he made his fortunes as a merchant in London. His son Alexander, the Second Innes of Raemoir extended Raemoir House after his son Alexander, the Third Innes of Raemoir, was born in 1846. Having a guaranteed successor allowed the Innes to undertake the ambitious renovations which included a new addition to the east wing of the building as well as the creation of the third floor.

Due to the death of Alexander, the Second Innes of Raemoir and his son (also Alexander), the Third Innes of Raemoir, within a year of each other Alexander, the Fourth Innes of Raemoir and his siblings were both orphaned and forced to mortgage Raemoir due to the crippling financial struggles caused by having to pay Death Duty.

Alexander, the Fourth Innes of Raemoir died in World War I in 1915 at the age of 43. He left his estate to his younger brother James William Guy Innes who joined the Royal Navy at the age of 16. Innes inherited the estate but did not inherit his brother's money or household items and as a result sold Raemoir in 1921.

==== The Cowdrays ====
Weetman Dickinson Pearson, 1st Viscount Cowdray was a Liberal Party Politician and served as MP for Colchester from 1895 to 1910 after which time he was raised to the House of Lords as Baron Cowdray. In 1917 Cowdray became a sworn member of the Privy Council under David Lloyd George and briefly served in a Ministerial role as a Secretary of State. The Secretary of State for Air was in charge of the Royal Air Force.

Cowdray only agreed to take this posting provided he receive no salary, and his request was granted. Despite increasing output of aircraft by three times during his tenure Cowdray resigned in November 1917. He never held office again and spent the remainder of his life dedicated to philanthropy.

=== Modernity ===
In 1943 the sisters Peggy Jordan and Kit Sabin came into ownership of Raemoir House and offered it as a respite home for war-wounded officers until after war was over when they converted it into a hotel. They were known for hosting society retreats, for actors who had performed in His Majesty's Theatreto Royalty, Politicians, travelling dignitaries as well as TV stars of the 60’s, 70’s and 80’s and an array of media greats such as Oasis, Van Morrison, Cliff Richard, Ronnie Corbett and Hollywood actor Charlton Heston all of whom earned it the reputation of being the “Claridge’s of the North”, a reference to the famous hotel in Mayfair. In 2010 Neil Rae and his wife Julie took over Raemoir House and it has been in their hands ever since. Originally they operated Raemoir as a hotel but since 2017 the house has only been available on a private hire basis for exclusive use.

== Gallery ==
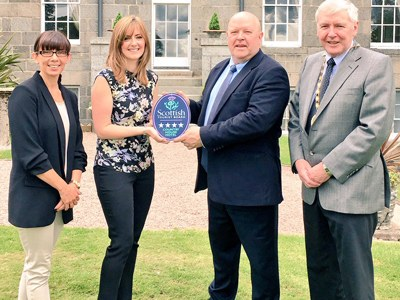

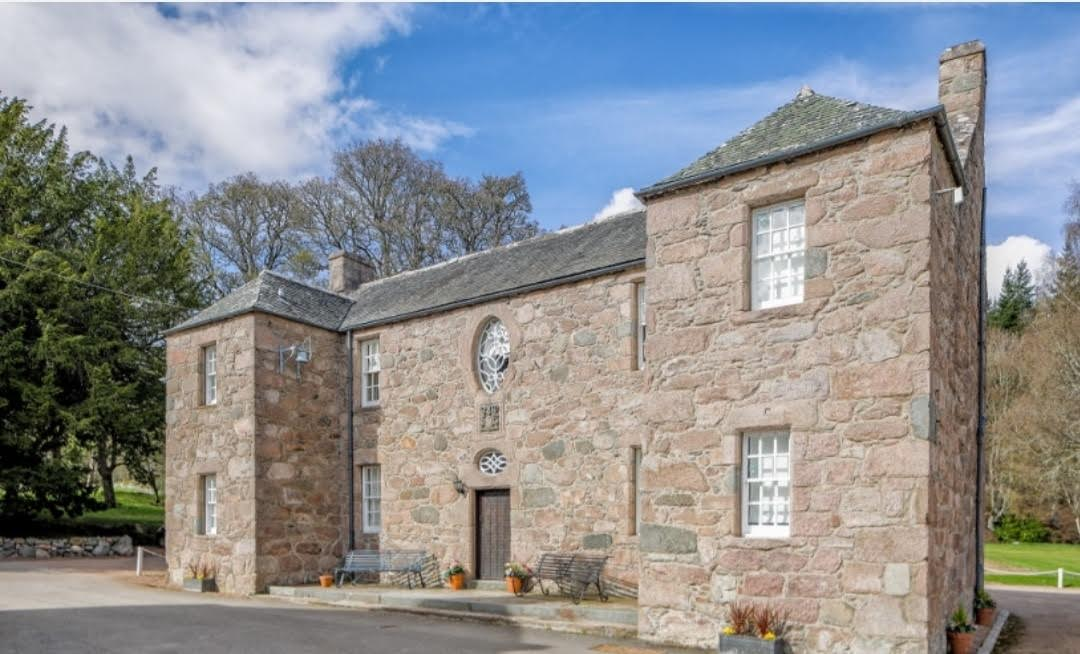

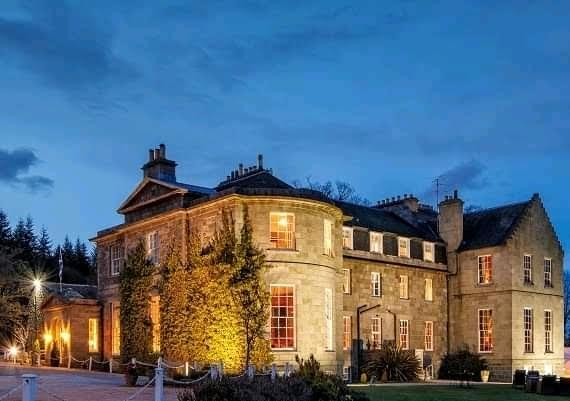

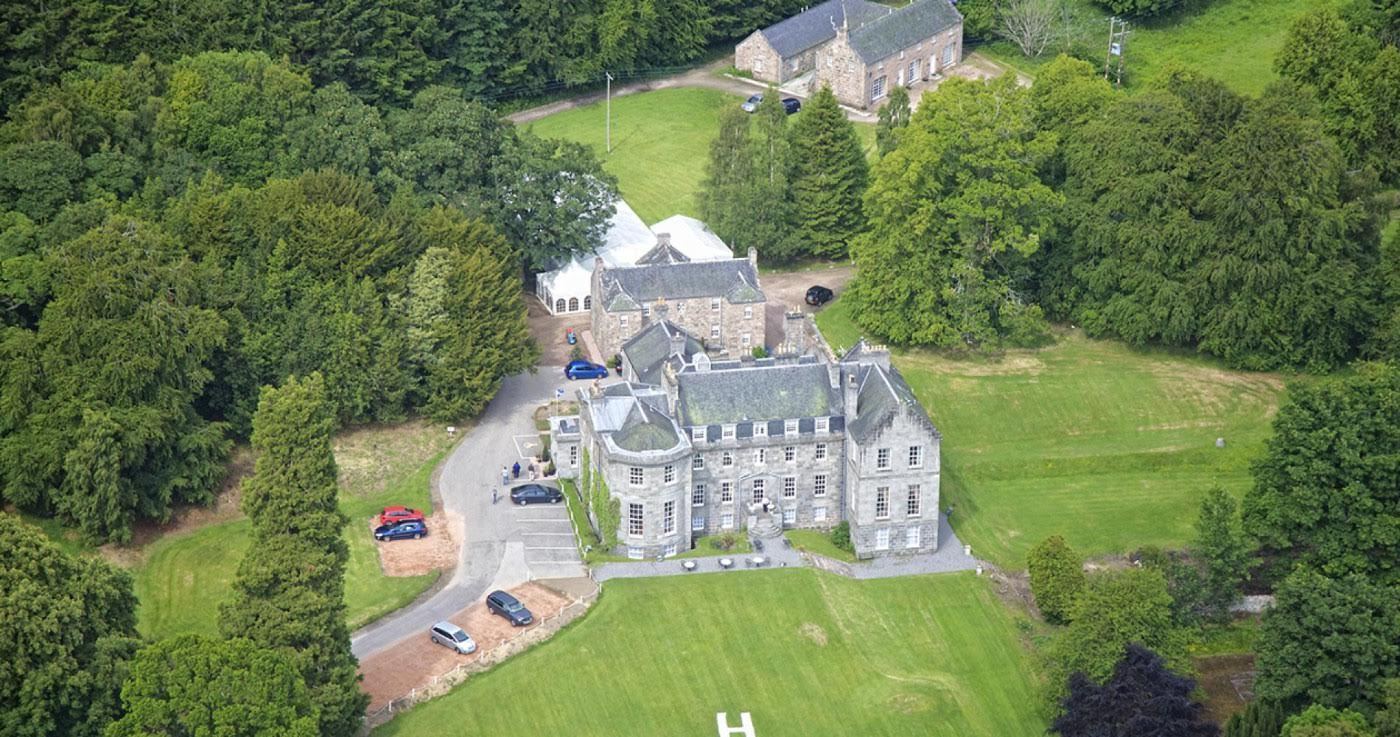
