= Marquess of Aberdeen and Temair =

Title in the Peerage of the United Kingdom

Marquessate of Aberdeen and Temair
- Arms of the Marquess of Aberdeen and Temair Blazon Arms: Azure, three boars’ heads couped or armed proper and langued gules within a double tressure flowered and counter-flowered interchangeably with thistles, roses, and fleurs-de-lys of the second. Crest: Two arms holding a bow and arrow straight upwards in a shooting posture and at full draught all proper. Supporters: Dexter, an Earl, and sinister, a Doctor of Laws, both habited in their robes proper. Motto: Fortuna sequatur (Let fortune follow).
- Creation date: 4 January 1916
- Created by: King George V
- Peerage: Peerage of the United Kingdom
- First holder: John Hamilton-Gordon, 1st Marquess of Aberdeen and Temair
- Present holder: George Gordon, 8th Marquess of Aberdeen and Temair
- Heir apparent: Ivo Gordon, Earl of Haddo
- Remainder to: Heirs male of the first Marquess's body lawfully begotten
- Subsidiary titles: Earl of Aberdeen; Earl of Haddo; Viscount of Formartine; Viscount Gordon; Lord Haddo, Methlic, Tarves and Kellie
- Status: Extant
- Former seat: Haddo House
- Motto: FORTUNA SEQUATUR (Let fortune follow)

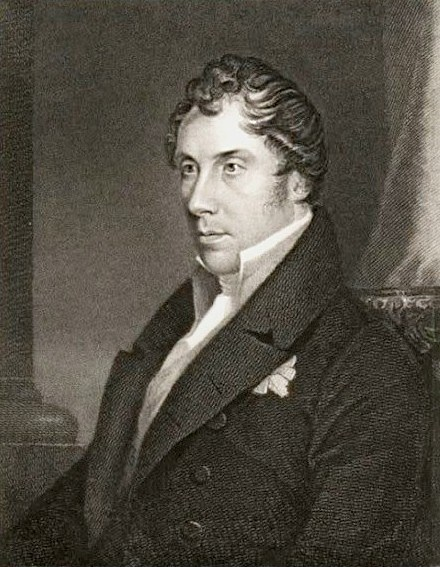
George Hamilton-Gordon, 4th Earl of Aberdeen.

Marquess of Aberdeen and Temair, in the County of Aberdeen, in the County of Meath and in the County of Argyll, is a title in the Peerage of the United Kingdom. It was created on 4 January 1916 for John Hamilton-Gordon, 7th Earl of Aberdeen.

== Family history ==
=== Baronetcy of Haddo ===
The Gordon family descends from John Gordon, who fought as a Royalist against the Covenanters in the Civil War. In 1642 he was created a baronet, of Haddo in the County of Aberdeen, in the Baronetage of Nova Scotia. In 1644 he was found guilty of treason and beheaded, with the baronetcy forfeited. The title was restored after the Restoration for his son John, the second Baronet.

=== Earldom of Aberdeen ===
The second Baronet died without male issue and was succeeded by his younger brother, the third Baronet. He was a noted advocate and served as Lord President of the Court of Session and as Lord Chancellor of Scotland. On 30 November 1682 he was raised to the Peerage of Scotland as Lord Haddo, Methlick, Tarves and Kellie, Viscount of Formartine and Earl of Aberdeen. He was succeeded by his only surviving son, the second Earl. He sat in the House of Lords as a Scottish representative peer from 1721 to 1727. On his death the titles passed to his eldest son from his second marriage, the third Earl. He was a Scottish Representative Peer from 1747 to 1761 and from 1774 to 1790.

=== Lord Aberdeen, Prime Minister ===
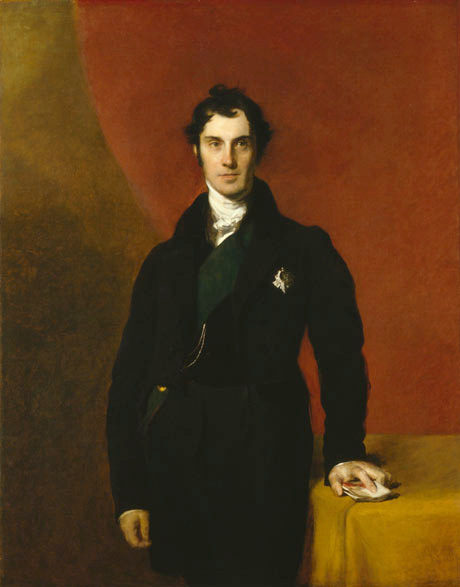
Portrait of Lord Aberdeen by Thomas Lawrence, 1830. The Fourth Earl when serving as Foreign Secretary.

The third earl was succeeded by his grandson, the fourth Earl, who was the eldest son of George Gordon, Lord Haddo. On 1 June 1814 he was created Viscount Gordon, of Aberdeen in the County of Aberdeen, in the Peerage of the United Kingdom, which entitled him to an automatic seat in the House of Lords. Lord Aberdeen was a distinguished diplomat and statesman and served as Foreign Secretary from 1828 to 1830 and from 1841 to 1846 and as Prime Minister of the United Kingdom from 1852 to 1855. Aberdeen married firstly Lady Catherine Elizabeth (1784–1812), daughter of John Hamilton, 1st Marquess of Abercorn, and assumed by Royal licence the additional surname of Hamilton in 1818.

When Lord Aberdeen died, the titles passed to his eldest son from his second marriage to Harriet Douglas, the fifth Earl. He sat as Liberal member of parliament (MP) for Aberdeenshire. His eldest son, the sixth Earl, was a sailor and adventurer. He was accidentally drowned off the coast of America in 1870, without marrying or having children.

=== Marquess of Aberdeen and Temair ===
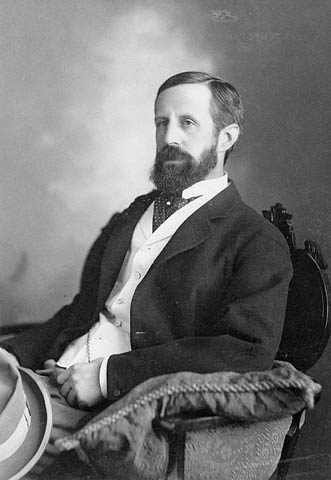
John Hamilton-Gordon, 1st Marquess of Aberdeen and Temair

The sixth earl of Aberdeen was succeeded by his younger brother, the seventh Earl. John Hamilton-Gordon, was a Liberal politician and served as Lord-Lieutenant of Ireland in 1886 and from 1905 to 1915 and as Governor General of Canada from 1893 to 1898. On 4 January 1916 he was created Earl of Haddo, in the County of Aberdeen, and Marquess of Aberdeen and Temair, in the County of Aberdeen, in the County of Meath and in the County of Argyll. Both titles are in the Peerage of the United Kingdom.

He was succeeded by his eldest son, the second Marquess, who was a member of the London County Council and served as Lord-Lieutenant of Aberdeenshire. He was childless and was succeeded by his younger brother, the third Marquess. He was notably President of the Federation of British Industries. When he died the titles passed to his eldest son, the fourth Marquess. He was a member of the Aberdeenshire County Council and Lord-Lieutenant of Aberdeenshire. He had four adopted children but no biological issue and was succeeded by his younger brother, the fifth Marquess. He was a broadcaster working for the BBC. He never married and on his death in 1984 the titles passed to his fourth and youngest brother, the sixth Marquess. He was Chairman of The Arts Club. Upon his death in 2002, the seventh Marquess, who was a Deputy Lieutenant of Aberdeenshire, inherited the titles. As of 2020, the Marquessate is held by George Gordon, who is the eighth Marquess of Aberdeen and Temair, having succeeded in that year.

=== Other family members ===
Numerous other members of the Gordon family have also gained distinction. The Hon. William Gordon (died 1816), eldest son from the third marriage of the second Earl, was a general in the Army. The Hon. Cosmo Gordon, second son from the third marriage of the second Earl, was a colonel in the Army. The Hon. Alexander Gordon (1739–1792), third son from the third marriage of the second Earl, was a Lord of Session from 1788 to 1792 under the judicial title of Lord Rockville. His son William Duff-Gordon was member of parliament for Worcester. In 1815 he succeeded his uncle as second Baron of Halkin according to a special remainder and assumed the additional surname of Duff (see Duff-Gordon baronets for further history of this branch of the family). The Hon. William Gordon, younger brother of the fourth Earl, was a vice-admiral in the Royal Navy and sat as member of parliament for Aberdeenshire. The Hon. Alexander Gordon (1786–1815), younger brother of the fourth Earl, was a soldier and was killed at the Battle of Waterloo.

The Hon. Sir Robert Gordon, younger brother of the fourth Earl, was a diplomat and served as British Ambassador to Austria. The Hon. John Gordon (1792–1869), younger brother of the fourth Earl, was an admiral in the Royal Navy. The Hon. Sir Alexander Hamilton-Gordon (1817–1890), eldest son of the second marriage of the fourth Earl, was a general in the Army and sat as member of parliament for Aberdeenshire East. His eldest son, Sir Alexander Hamilton-Gordon was also a general in the Army. Reverend the Hon. Douglas Hamilton-Gordon (1824–1901), third son of the second marriage of the fourth Earl, was Chaplain-in-Ordinary to Queen Victoria and Canon of Salisbury. The Hon. Arthur Hamilton-Gordon, fourth son of the second marriage of the fourth Earl, was a Liberal politician and was created Baron Stanmore in 1893 (see this title for more information on him and this branch of the family). Ishbel Hamilton-Gordon, Marchioness of Aberdeen and Temair, daughter of Dudley Marjoribanks, 1st Baron Tweedmouth, and wife of the first Marquess of Aberdeen and Temair, was an author, philanthropist and an advocate of woman's interests.

The family seat is Haddo House, Aberdeenshire. The title Earl of Haddo is the courtesy title for the Marquess's eldest son and heir, the eldest son of whom uses the courtesy title Viscount of Formartine. The Marquesses of Aberdeen and Temair are related to the Marquesses of Huntly. Sir John Gordon (died c. 1395) of Strathbogie, ancestor of Sir John Gordon, 1st Baronet, was the brother of Elizabeth Gordon. She married Sir Alexander Seton (died 1438) and was the mother of Alexander Gordon, 1st Earl of Huntly (ancestor of the Marquesses of Huntly).

== Gordon baronets, of Haddo (1642) ==
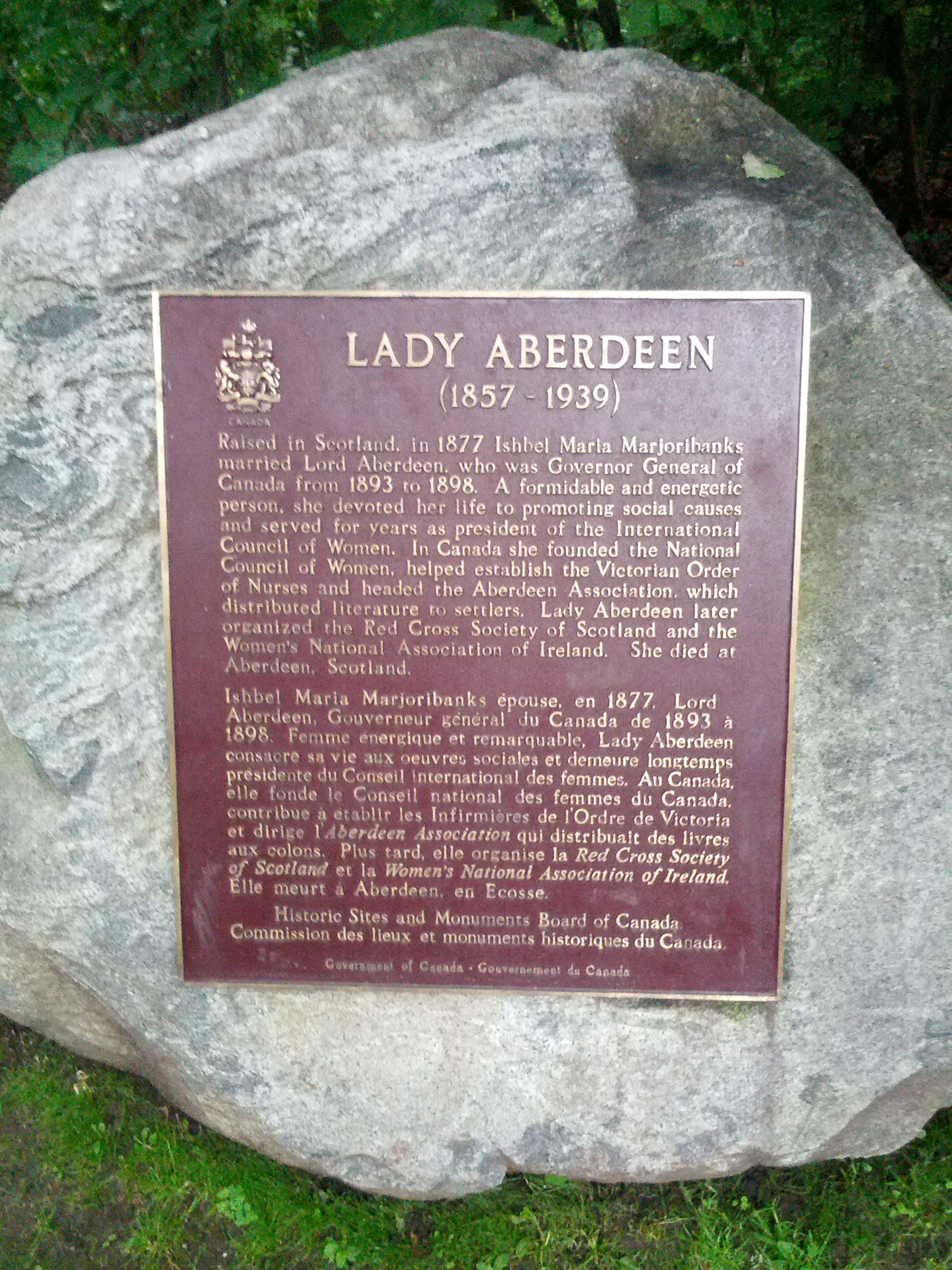
Memorial in Ottawa to Ishbel, Marchioness of Aberdeen, wife of the first Marquess, who was Governor General of Canada from 1893 to 1898.

- Sir John Gordon, 1st Baronet (1610–1644)
- Sir John Gordon, 2nd Baronet (c. 1632–1665)
- Sir George Gordon, 3rd Baronet (1637–1720) (created Earl of Aberdeen in 1682)

== Earls of Aberdeen (1682) ==
Other titles (1st Earl onwards): Viscount of Formartine (Sc 1682), Lord Haddo, Methlick, Tarves and Kellie (Sc 1682)
Other titles (4th Earl onwards): Viscount Gordon (UK 1814)

- George Gordon, 1st Earl of Aberdeen (1637–1720)
  - George Gordon, Lord Haddo (1674-d. between 1694 and 1708)
- William Gordon, 2nd Earl of Aberdeen (1679–1745)
- George Gordon, 3rd Earl of Aberdeen, (1722–1801)
  - George Gordon, Lord Haddo (1764–1791)
- George Hamilton-Gordon, 4th Earl of Aberdeen (1784–1860) (created Viscount Gordon in 1814)
- George John James Hamilton-Gordon, 5th Earl of Aberdeen (1816–1864)
- George Hamilton-Gordon, 6th Earl of Aberdeen (1841–1870)
- John Campbell Hamilton-Gordon, 7th Earl of Aberdeen (1847–1934) (created Marquess of Aberdeen and Temair in 1916)

== Marquesses of Aberdeen and Temair (1916) ==
Other titles (1st Marquess onwards): Earl of Haddo (UK 1916), Viscount Gordon (UK 1814), Viscount of Formartine (Sc 1682), Lord Haddo, Methlick, Tarves and Kellie (Sc 1682)

- John Campbell Gordon, 1st Marquess of Aberdeen and Temair, (1847–1934)
- George Gordon, 2nd Marquess of Aberdeen and Temair (1879–1965)
- Dudley Gladstone Gordon, 3rd Marquess of Aberdeen and Temair (1883–1972)
- David George Ian Alexander Gordon, 4th Marquess of Aberdeen and Temair (1908–1974)
- Archibald Victor Dudley Gordon, 5th Marquess of Aberdeen and Temair (1913–1984)
- Alastair Ninian John Gordon, 6th Marquess of Aberdeen and Temair (1920–2002)
- Alexander George Gordon, 7th Marquess of Aberdeen and Temair (1955–2020)
- George Ian Alastair Gordon, 8th Marquess of Aberdeen and Temair (b. 1983)

== Present peer ==
George Ian Alastair Gordon, 8th Marquess of Aberdeen and Temair (born 4 May 1983) is the son of the 7th Marquess and his wife Joanna Clodagh Houldsworth. Styled formally as Viscount Formartine from 1984, he was educated at Harrow School.

He was styled as Earl of Haddo between 2002 and 12 March 2020, when he succeeded his father as Marquess of Aberdeen and Temair, Earl of Haddo, Earl of Aberdeen, Viscount of Formartine, Viscount Gordon of Aberdeen, Lord Haddo, Methlick, Tarves and Kellie, and also as a baronet (Gordon, of Haddo, Aberdeenshire, 1642).

As Lord Haddo he married Isabelle Coaten, daughter of David Coaten, and they have four children

- Ivo Alexander Ninian Gordon, Earl of Haddo (born 2012), heir apparent
- Lord Johnny David Nehemiah Gordon (born 2014)
- Lady Christabel Alexandra Lully Gordon (born 2016)
- Lord Louis George Solomon Gordon (born 2018)

== Succession and family tree ==
Line of succession (simplified)
- Alexander George Gordon, 7th Marquess of Aberdeen and Temair (1955–2020)
  - George Ian Alastair Gordon, 8th Marquess of Aberdeen and Temair (born 1983)
    - (1) Ivo Alexander Ninian Gordon, Earl of Haddo (born 2012)
    - (2) Lord Johnny David Nehemiah Gordon (born 2014)
    - (3) Lord Louis George Solomon Gordon (born 2018)
  - (4) Lord Sam Dudley Gordon (born 1985)
    - (5) Bertie Raiph Dudley Gordon (born 2016)
  - (6) Lord Charles David Gordon (born 1990)

There are further heirs to the subsidiary Earldom of Aberdeen, including the Duff-Gordon baronets, who are descended from Lord Rockville, a younger son of the second earl.

Aberdeen, Aberdeen and Temair, Formartine, Gordon, and Haddo, Methlic, Tarves and Kellie family tree

Baronet of Haddo, 1642
John Gordon; 1610–1644; 1st Baronet of Haddo
Baronetcy forfeited, 1644
Baronetcy restored, 1660	Earl of Aberdeen, Viscount of Formartine, and Lord Haddo, Methlic, Tarves and Kellie, 1682
John Gordon c. 1632–1665; 2nd Baronet of Haddo	George Gordon; 1637–1720; 1st Earl of Aberdeen, etc., 3rd Baronet of Haddo
William Gordon; 1679–1746; 2nd Earl of Aberdeen, etc., 4th Baronet of Haddo
George Gordon; 1722–1801; 3rd Earl of Aberdeen, etc., 5th Baronet of Haddo
George Gordon; 1764–1791
Viscount Gordon, 1814
George Hamilton-Gordon; 1784–1860; 4th Earl of Aberdeen, etc., 1st Viscount Gordon; 6th Baronet of Haddo
George John James Hamilton-Gordon; 1816–1864; 5th Earl of Aberdeen, etc., 2nd Viscount Gordon; 7th Baronet of Haddo
Marquess of Aberdeen and Temair and Earl of Haddo, 1916
George Hamilton-Gordon; 1841–1870; 6th Earl of Aberdeen, etc., 3rd Viscount Gordon; 8th Baronet of Haddo	John Campbell Hamilton-Gordon; 1847–1934; 1st Marquess of Aberdeen and Temair, etc., 7th Earl of Aberdeen, etc., 4th Viscount Gordon; 9th Baronet of Haddo
George Gordon; 1879–1965; 2nd Marquess of Aberdeen and Temair, etc., 8th Earl of Aberdeen, etc., 5th Viscount Gordon; 10th Baronet of Haddo	Dudley Gladstone Gordon; 1883–1972; 3rd Marquess of Aberdeen and Temair, etc., 9th Earl of Aberdeen, etc., 6th Viscount Gordon; 11th Baronet of Haddo
David George Ian Alexander Gordon; 1908–1974; 4th Marquess of Aberdeen and Temair, etc., 10th Earl of Aberdeen, etc., 7th Viscount Gordon; 12th Baronet of Haddo	Archibald Victor Dudley Gordon; 1913–1984; 5th Marquess of Aberdeen and Temair, etc., 11th Earl of Aberdeen, etc., 8th Viscount Gordon; 13th Baronet of Haddo	Alastair Ninian John Gordon; 1920–2002; 6th Marquess of Aberdeen and Temair, etc., 12th Earl of Aberdeen, etc., 9th Viscount Gordon; 14th Baronet of Haddo
Alexander George Gordon; 1955–2020; 7th Marquess of Aberdeen and Temair, etc., 13th Earl of Aberdeen, etc., 10th Viscount Gordon; 15th Baronet of Haddo
George Ian Alastair Gordon b. 1983; 8th Marquess of Aberdeen and Temair, etc., 14th Earl of Aberdeen, etc., 11th Viscount Gordon; 16th Baronet of Haddo
Ivo Alexander Ninian Gordon b. 2012 styled Earl of Haddo
Heir apparent

== See also ==
- Baron Stanmore
- Duff-Gordon baronets
