= John Hamilton-Gordon, 1st Marquess of Aberdeen and Temair =

British politician (1847-1934)

The Most Honourable The Marquess of Aberdeen and Temair KT KP GCMG GCVO PC
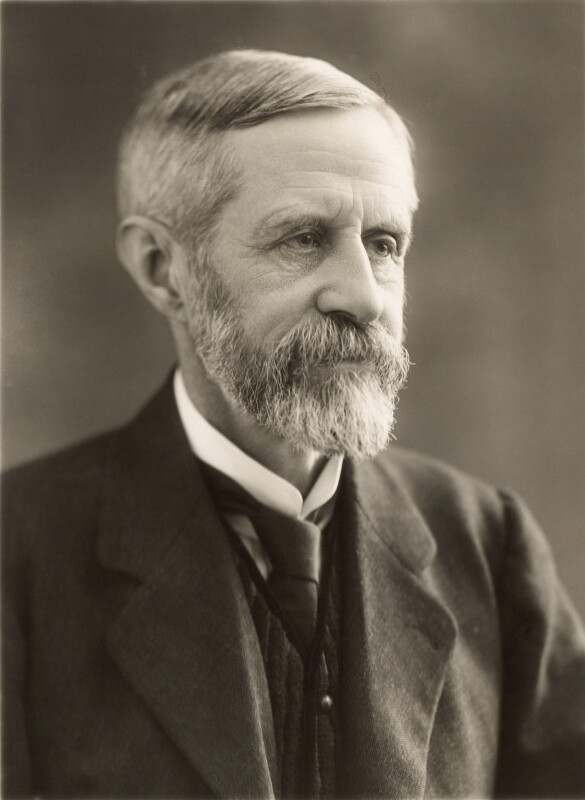
- Aberdeen in 1920

Lord Lieutenant of Ireland
- In office 11 December 1905 – 17 February 1915
- Monarchs: Edward VII; George V
- Prime Minister: Sir Henry Campbell-Bannerman; H. H. Asquith; David Lloyd George
- Preceded by: The Earl of Dudley
- Succeeded by: Lord Wimborne
- In office 8 February 1886 – 20 July 1886
- Monarch: Victoria
- Prime Minister: William Ewart Gladstone
- Preceded by: The Earl of Carnarvon
- Succeeded by: The Marquess of Londonderry

7th Governor General of Canada
- In office 18 September 1893 – 12 November 1898
- Monarch: Victoria
- Prime Minister: John Thompson; Mackenzie Bowell; Charles Tupper; Wilfrid Laurier
- Preceded by: Lord Stanley of Preston
- Succeeded by: The Earl of Minto

Personal details
- Born: John Campbell Hamilton-Gordon; 3 August 1847 Edinburgh, Scotland
- Died: 7 March 1934 (aged 86) Tarland, Aberdeenshire, Scotland
- Party: Liberal
- Spouse: Ishbel Marjoribanks
- Children: George; Marjorie; Dudley; Archibald
- Parent(s): The 5th Earl of Aberdeen; Mary Baillie
- Education: University of St. Andrews University College, Oxford

John Campbell Hamilton-Gordon, 1st Marquess of Aberdeen and Temair (3 August 1847 – 7 March 1934), styled Earl of Aberdeen from 1870–1916, was a Scottish peer and colonial administrator. Born in Edinburgh, Aberdeen held office in several countries, serving twice as Lord Lieutenant of Ireland (1886; 1905–1915) and serving from 1893 to 1898 as Governor General of Canada.

== Early and personal life ==
Aberdeen was born in Edinburgh, the third son of George Hamilton-Gordon, 5th Earl of Aberdeen, and his wife, Mary Baillie, daughter of George Baillie and sister to the Earl of Haddington.

He studied at the University of St Andrews and University College, Oxford.

As the third son, John was not expected to inherit his father's titles, which his eldest brother, George (1841–1870), inherited upon their father' death in 1864. However, in 1868, his elder brother James Henry (1845–1868) died by suicide, and two years later, George drowned on a voyage to Australia, unmarried and thus without heirs. John succeeded as 7th Earl of Aberdeen, as well as 7th Viscount of Formartine, 4th Viscount Gordon, and 7th Lord Haddo, Methlic, Tarves and Kellie.

== Political life ==
Aberdeen entered the House of Lords following his succession to his brother's titles in January 1870. A Liberal, he was present for William Ewart Gladstone's first Midlothian campaign at Lord Rosebery's house in 1879. He became Lord Lieutenant of Aberdeenshire in 1880, served as Lord High Commissioner to the General Assembly of the Church of Scotland from 1881 to 1885 (he held the position again in 1915), and was briefly appointed Lord Lieutenant of Ireland in 1886. He became a Privy Counsellor in the same year.

In 1884, he hosted a dinner at Haddo House honouring Gladstone on his tour of Scotland. The occasion was captured by the painter Alfred Edward Emslie; the painting is now in the collection of the National Portrait Gallery, London, having been donated by Aberdeen's daughter Marjorie in 1953.

He was appointed Honorary Colonel of the 1st Aberdeenshire Artillery Volunteers on 14 January 1888 and retained the position with its successors, the 1st Highland Brigade, Royal Field Artillery, until after World War I.

In 1889, he was chosen as an alderman of the first Middlesex County Council, his address being given as Dollis Hill House, Kilburn, in that county.

In 1891, he bought the Coldstream Ranch in the northern Okanagan Valley in British Columbia and launched the first commercial orchard operations in that region, which gave birth to an industry and settlement colony as other Britons emigrated to the region because of his prestige and bought into the orcharding lifestyle. The ranch is today part of the municipality of Coldstream, and various placenames in the area commemorate him and his family, such as Aberdeen Lake and Haddo Creek.

He served as Governor General of Canada from 1893 to 1898 during a period of political transition. He travelled extensively throughout the country and is described as having "transformed the role of Governor General from that of the aristocrat representing the King or Queen in Canada to a symbol representing the interests of all citizens".

He was made a Knight Grand Cross of the Order of St Michael and St George in 1895.

He was again appointed Lord Lieutenant of Ireland in 1905, and served until 1915. During his tenure he also served as Rector of the University of St Andrews (1913–1916), was created a Knight Companion of the Order of the Thistle (1906), and was created a Knight Grand Cross of the Royal Victorian Order (1911) on the occasion of the King's visit to Dublin. Following his retirement, he was created Earl of Haddo, in the County of Aberdeen, and Marquess of Aberdeen and Temair, in the County of Aberdeen, in the County of Meath and in the County of Argyll, in January 1916.

== Marriage and issue ==
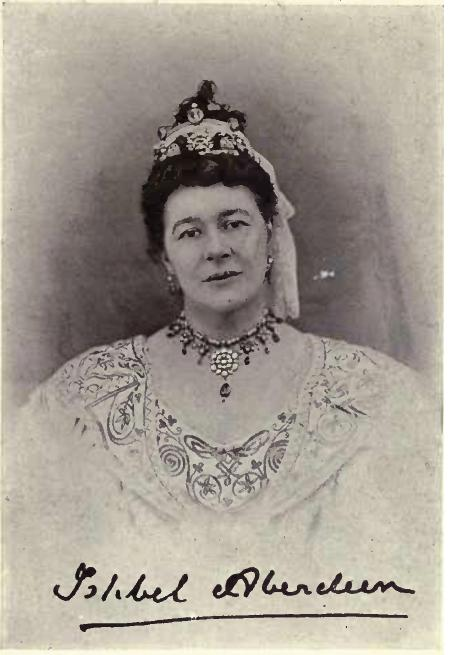
Ishbel Hamilton-Gordon, Marchioness of Aberdeen and Temair

In 1877, Aberdeen married Ishbel Marjoribanks (1857–1939), daughter of Sir Dudley Marjoribanks and Isabella Weir-Hogg. They had been long-time friends and were first introduced by Arthur Balfour six years earlier while riding at Rotten Row.

Lady Aberdeen later served as President of the International Council of Women from 1893 to 1899 and founded the National Council of Women of Canada and the Victorian Order of Nurses.

They had five children:

- George Gordon, 2nd Marquess of Aberdeen and Temair (1879–1965), succeeded father
- Lady Marjorie Adeline Gordon DBE (1880–1970), married John Sinclair, later 1st Lord Pentland
- Lady Dorothea Gordon (March – November 1882), died in infancy
- Dudley Gladstone Gordon, 3rd Marquess of Aberdeen and Temair (1883–1972), succeeded brother
- The Hon. Archibald "Archie" Ian Gordon (1884–1909), killed in a motor accident; known as the lover of Lady Desborough

== Later life ==
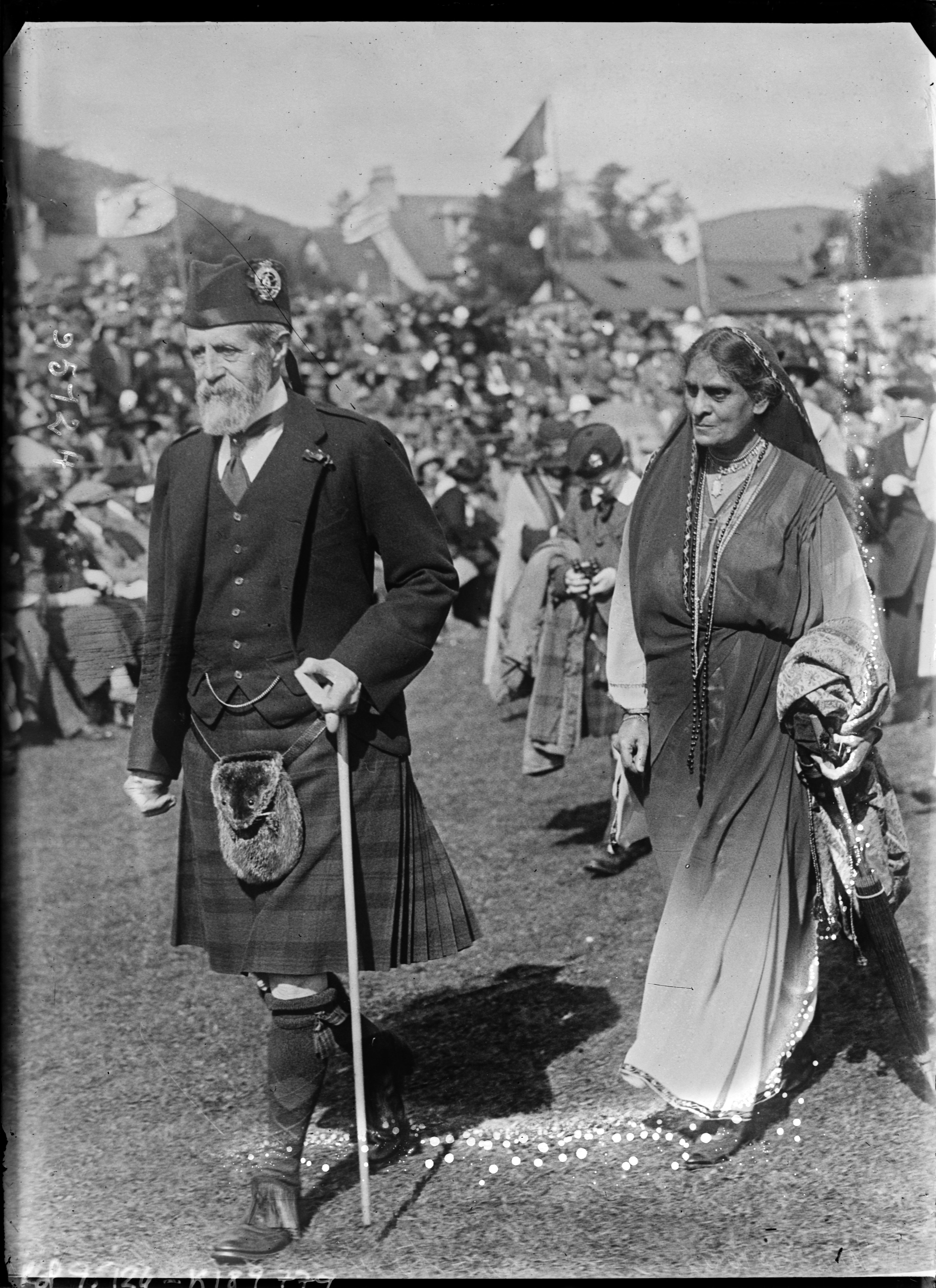
With Cornelia Sorabji at the 1924 Braemar Gathering

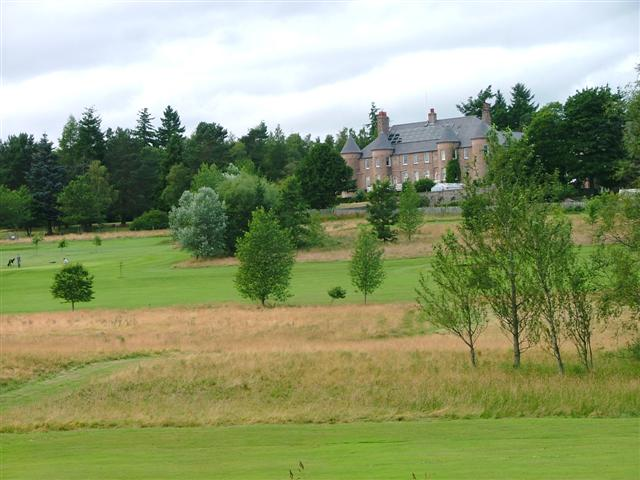
Aberdeen died at the House of Cromar (now Alastrean House) in 1934.

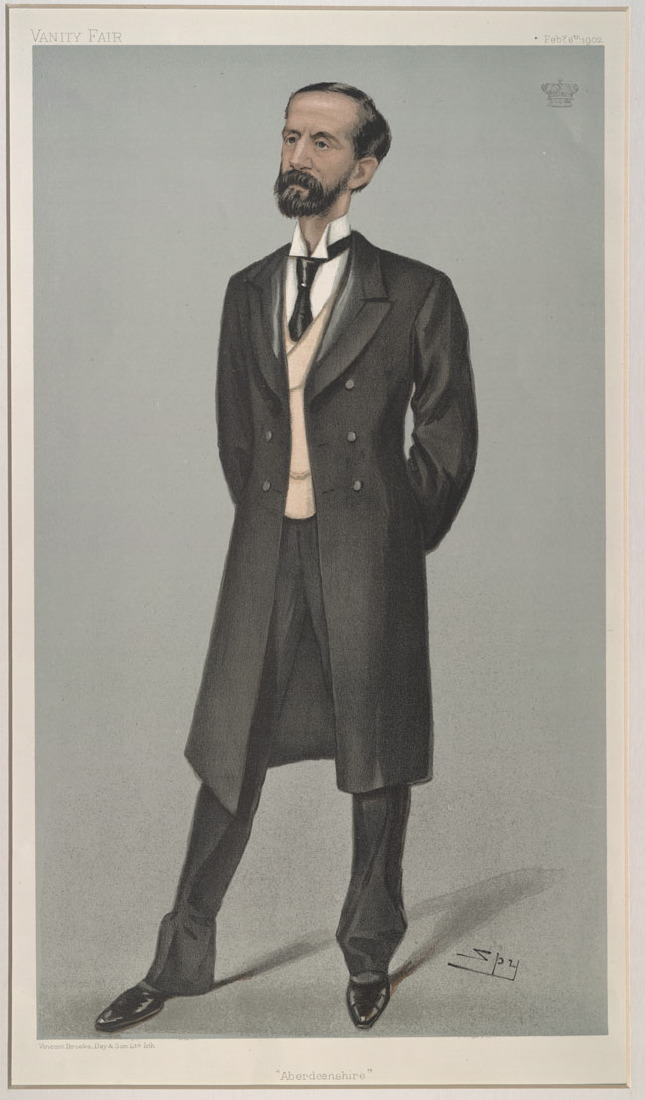
Aberdeen caricatured by Spy for Vanity Fair, 1902

Aberdeen lived the later stages of his life at the House of Cromar in Tarland, Aberdeenshire, which he had built and where he died in 1934. His son, George, succeeded to the marquessate.

The House of Cromar passed to Sir Alexander MacRobert in 1934 and it was renamed Alastrean House by his widow. It was leased to the RAF Benevolent Fund in 1984.

Jokes Cracked by Lord Aberdeen, a memoir collection of John Hamilton-Gordon's dinner party repartee, was first published in 1929. The "bafflingly unfunny" book, long out of print, gained a cult following in more recent times and was reissued in 2013.

== The Rocking Chair Ranche ==
From 1883 until 1896, he was also an owner of and investor in the Rocking Chair Ranche located in Collingsworth County, Texas, together with his father-in-law, Lord Tweedmouth, and his brother-in-law, Edward Marjoribanks.

== Namesakes ==
Geographic Locations

- Ontario: Aberdeen Avenue, Toronto
- Ontario: Aberdeen Avenue, Hamilton
- Ontario: Aberdeen Avenue, Sarnia

Buildings

- Ontario: Aberdeen Pavilion, Ottawa

== Arms ==
Coat of arms of John Hamilton-Gordon, 1st Marquess of Aberdeen and Temair
Crest On a wreath Azure, Or and Gules, two arms holding a bow and arrow straight upwards in a shooting posture and at full draught all Proper. Escutcheon Azure, three boars' heads couped Or armed proper langued Gules within a tressure flowered and counterflowered interchangeably with thistles, roses and fleurs-de-lis Or. Supporters Dexter an earl in his robes sinister a doctor of law in his robes both Proper. Motto Fortuna Sequatur Orders The Most Ancient and Most Noble Order of the Thistle (Knight - KT)

Honorary titles
Preceded by The Earl of Kintore	Lord Lieutenant of Aberdeenshire; 1880–1934	Succeeded by The 2nd Marquess of Aberdeen and Temair
Government offices
Preceded by The Earl of Carnarvon	Lord Lieutenant of Ireland; 1886	Succeeded by The Marquess of Londonderry
Preceded by The Lord Stanley of Preston	Governor General of Canada; 1893–1898	Succeeded by The Earl of Minto
Preceded by The Earl of Dudley	Lord Lieutenant of Ireland; 1905–1915	Succeeded by The Lord Wimborne
Academic offices
Preceded by The Earl of Rosebery	Rector of the University of St Andrews; 1913–1916	Succeeded by Sir Douglas Haig
Peerage of the United Kingdom
New creation	Marquess of Aberdeen and Temair; 1916–1934	Succeeded by George Gordon
Peerage of Scotland
Preceded by George Hamilton-Gordon	Earl of Aberdeen; 1870–1934	Succeeded by George Gordon
