= Ishbel Hamilton-Gordon, Marchioness of Aberdeen and Temair =

Scottish author, philanthropist, and women's advocate

The Most Honourable The Marchioness of Aberdeen and Temair GBE
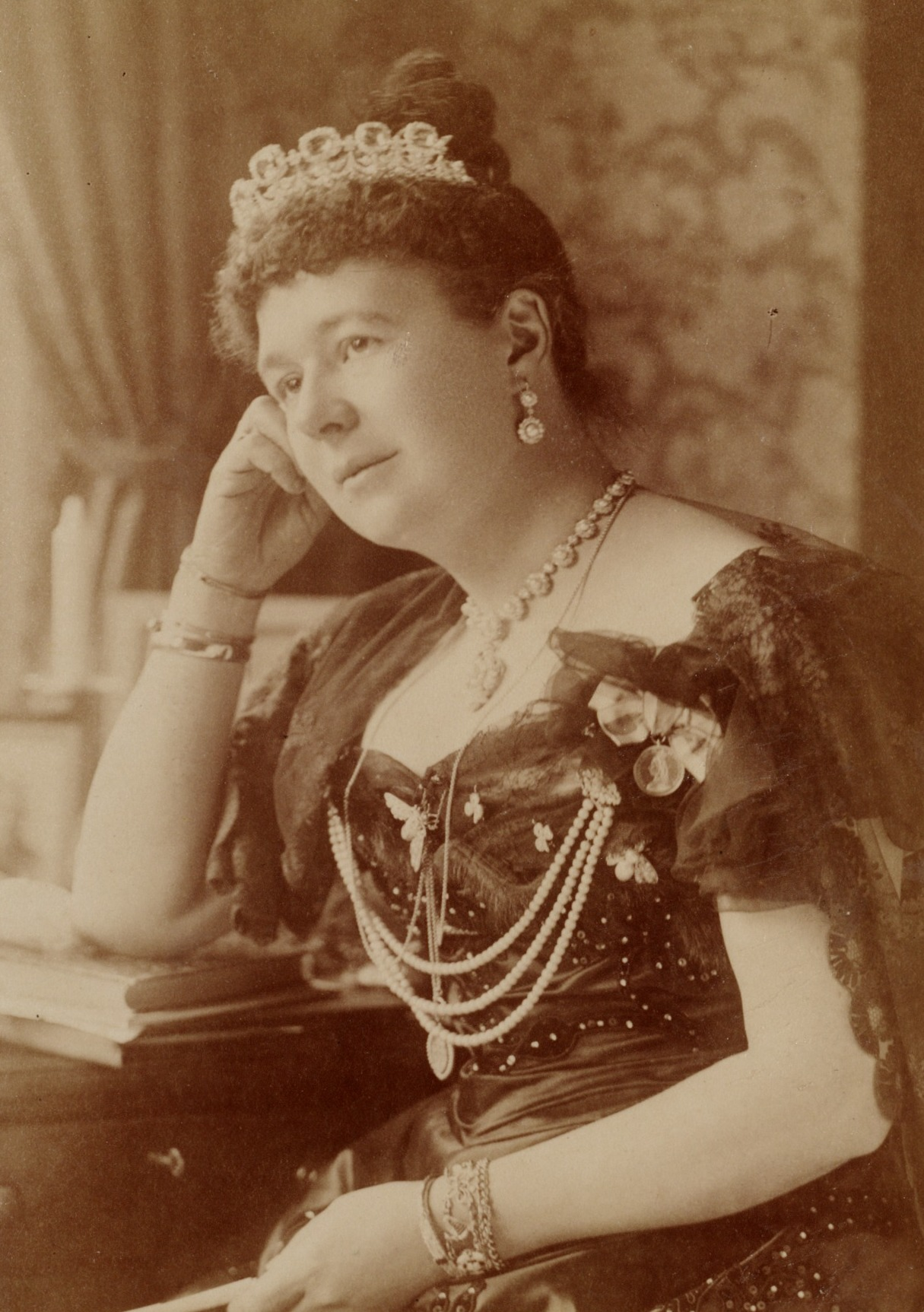
- Lady Aberdeen by W.J. Byrne & Co., 1899
- Born: Isabel Maria Marjoribanks; 15 March 1857; London, England
- Died: 18 April 1939 (aged 82); Rubislaw, Aberdeen, Scotland
- Other names: Ishbel Hamilton-Gordon; Isabel Aberdeen
- Occupations: Author, philanthropist
- Spouse: John Hamilton-Gordon, 1st Marquess of Aberdeen and Temair
- Children: George Gordon, 2nd Marquess of Aberdeen and Temair; Marjorie Sinclair, Baroness Pentland; Dudley Gordon, 3rd Marquess of Aberdeen and Temair; Lord Archibald Gordon
- Parents: Dudley Marjoribanks, 1st Baron Tweedmouth; Isabella Weir-Hogg

Signature
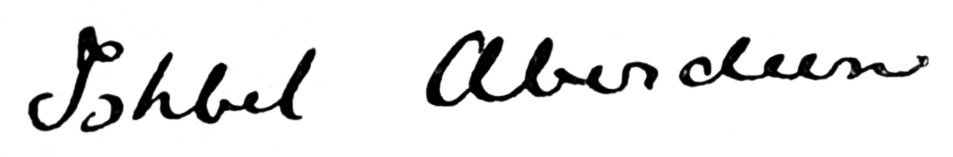

Ishbel Maria Hamilton-Gordon, Marchioness of Aberdeen and Temair, GBE (née Isabel Maria Marjoribanks; 15 March 1857 – 18 April 1939) (Note: later she used Ishbel, the Gaelic for Isabel) was a British writer, philanthropist, and an advocate of women's interests. As the wife of John Hamilton-Gordon, 1st Marquess of Aberdeen and Temair, she was viceregal consort of Canada from 1893 to 1898 and of Ireland from 1906 to 1915.

== Early life ==
Born in London, Isabel Maria Marjoribanks was the third daughter of the 1st Baron Tweedmouth and Isabella Weir-Hogg (daughter of Sir James Weir Hogg). A sometimes "anxious" child, she had enjoyed escaping to the mansion her father had built amidst the "rugged splendour of Glen Affric" in the Scottish Highlands. She received a well-rounded education in English, French, mathematics, history, and geography, and was such a good student that her teacher recommended she attend college. However, Lady Aberdeen's father shared the widely held opinion that university was no place for a woman. Instead, her education continued at home at her parents’ social events, where she met the famous politicians of the day. This experience helped prepare her for a lifetime of political involvement. Isabel became an evangelical at an early age, believing like many Victorians in a life dedicated to good works, as well as social and moral reform.

After a six-year acquaintance, she married John Campbell Hamilton-Gordon, the 7th Earl of Aberdeen (later the 1st Marquess of Aberdeen and Temair), on 7 November 1877 in St. George's Church, St. George Street, Hanover Square, London. The couple had four surviving children: George (1879), Marjorie (1880), Dudley (1883), and Archibald (1884). Lady Aberdeen's daughter has written that "Ishbel interpreted the duty of wife as one who not only provided for her husband a serene background in private life, but as one who also thought and fought for him in all his affairs."

== Social activism in England and Scotland ==
Lord Aberdeen was a Liberal and a member of the House of Lords, and Lady Aberdeen supported him by hosting social events. An intelligent and determined woman, she soon established her own political life as an activist. Because of political obligations, the family divided their time between London and their Scottish estate in Aberdeenshire. They called their home Haddo House, and it was here that Lady Aberdeen began her involvement with social reforms. She organized a Household Club that held classes for servants to learn singing, carving, reading, and other activities. The Aberdeens often attended their servants’ evening socials and meetings, and in London society it was rumoured that they had even dined together. They also funded a local school and hospital—healthcare was a cause that Lady Aberdeen supported throughout her life.

Lady Aberdeen's influence also extended beyond her country estate. She established the Onwards and Upward Association, which provided servant girls with postal courses on topics ranging from geography to literature to domestic science. This program spread from Aberdeenshire to include thousands of servants. Lady Aberdeen founded the Aberdeen Ladies' Union, an institution to help young women in Scotland. In 1883 she became the first president of the Ladies’ Union of Aberdeen, an organization that focused on the well-being of young women living in cities. An Emigration Committee chose suitable women and sponsored them to move to the colonies, especially Canada. Lady Aberdeen was also the head of the Women's Liberal Federation, which advocated for women's suffrage.

Her commitment to housing improvement and fascination with the work of Octavia Hill is recorded by her daughter Baroness Pentland who wrote in a 1952 biography of her mother: 'In February 1939 she presided at the showing (for the first time outside London) of a centenary exhibition illustrating the life of Hill's work which had been brought north and explained by Miss Anne Lupton'.

== Time in Canada ==
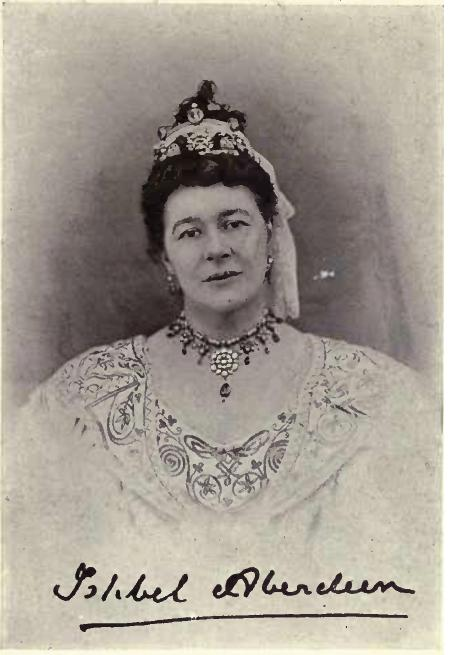
Lady Aberdeen by William James Topley, c. 1900.

In 1893, Lord Aberdeen was appointed the Governor General of Canada, a post he would occupy until 1898. The Aberdeens were no strangers to the country, as they had visited several times before; during their cross-Canada tour of 1890 they had even purchased a homestead in British Columbia. On that same visit they crossed the prairies, and Lady Aberdeen was struck by the difficult and isolated lifestyle of pioneers. She subsequently founded the Aberdeen Association for Distribution of Good Literature to Settlers in the West, which sent settlers packages of books and magazines.

Lady Aberdeen was dedicated to her role as Governor General's wife (Viceregal consort of Canada). She hosted many popular social events, such as winter festivals and costume balls, and was more politically involved than her predecessors. She travelled extensively, attending events and collecting information for her husband. She regularly offered him advice, and in fact newspapers commented (sometimes critically) that it appeared she held the power in their relationship.

In 1893, the year she arrived in Canada, Lady Aberdeen was named the first president of the International Council of Women, an organization that campaigns for women's rights. Consequently, she organized the National Council of Women of Canada and travelled the country establishing local branches. One of the activists she worked with was Adelaide Hoodless, who went on to found the Women's Institute.

Lady Aberdeen was the first sponsor of the Women's Art Association of Canada, founded in 1892. Yet another of her endeavours was the May Court Club, an association that enabled well-off young women to do charitable work. A key organization that she helped establish is the Victorian Order of Nurses, which aimed to give women better training and a higher salary so they could provide services to rural and disadvantaged populations. Lady Aberdeen and the group's supporters had to overcome resistance from the medical community before receiving the organization's royal charter in 1898. That same year, Lord and Lady Aberdeen returned to England.

== Time in Ireland ==
Lord Aberdeen belonged to the Liberal Party, and when it regained power in parliament in 1906 he was named the Lord Lieutenant of Ireland for the second time. He had previously been Lord Lieutenant, or viceroy, for approximately six months in 1886. True to her nature, Lady Aberdeen identified herself with the cause of the Irish people and contributed to Lord Aberdeen's success over the course of his six months in office. During that time, Lady Aberdeen had promoted Irish crafts and became chairman of the Association of Irish Industries.

Their second term in Ireland lasted from 1906 to 1915, and this time she focused on healthcare and social well-being. Lady Aberdeen was involved with medical organizations like the Women's National Health Association of Ireland that were dedicated to treating and preventing tuberculosis and improving children's health. Her name lives on in Lady Ishbel Avenue, part of the former Purdysburn Fever Hospital site in south Belfast.

In 1911 she served as the first president of the Housing and Town Planning Association of Ireland, advocating for better housing and public spaces to address the prevalent poverty. Lady Aberdeen's Cottages in Mullingar are named after her. Although she had been quite popular during her first stint in Ireland, she faced a different reception upon her return.

By 1906 nationalist sentiment had increased significantly in Ireland, and her ties to Britain were held against her. Furthermore, her determination to have her way meant that she was not always sensitive to the Irish perspective.

== Later life ==
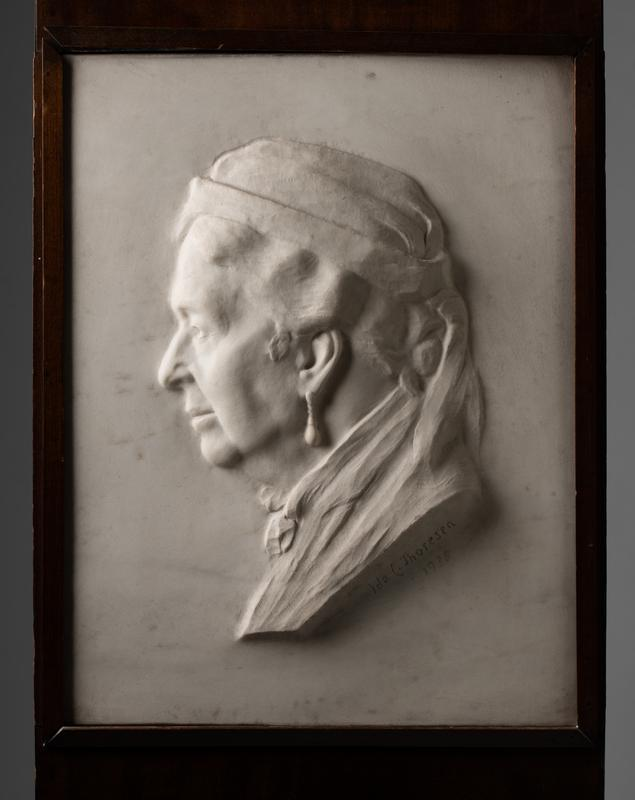
Ishbel, Marchioness of Aberdeen and Temair, by Ida Thoresen, 1935

Lord and Lady Aberdeen retired to their home in Scotland, but continued to be involved in social causes. Together they wrote a memoir, We Twa, that was published in 1925 to a positive reception and was followed by several expanded editions. The Canadian Journal of Lady Aberdeen, 1893–1898, was edited by John Saywell and published by the Champlain Society in 1960, after her death.

In 1931, Lady Aberdeen presented to the General Assembly of the Church of Scotland a petition of 336 women calling for women to be ordained to the ministry, diaconate and eldership of the Kirk. This resulted in a special commission, which recommended only that women should be ordained to the diaconate. It was not until 1968 that the Church of Scotland passed acts allowing women to become elders or enter the ministry. She continued to serve as the president of the International Council of Women until 1936. She died of a heart attack on 18 April 1939 at Gordon House in Rubislaw, Aberdeen.

== Recognition ==
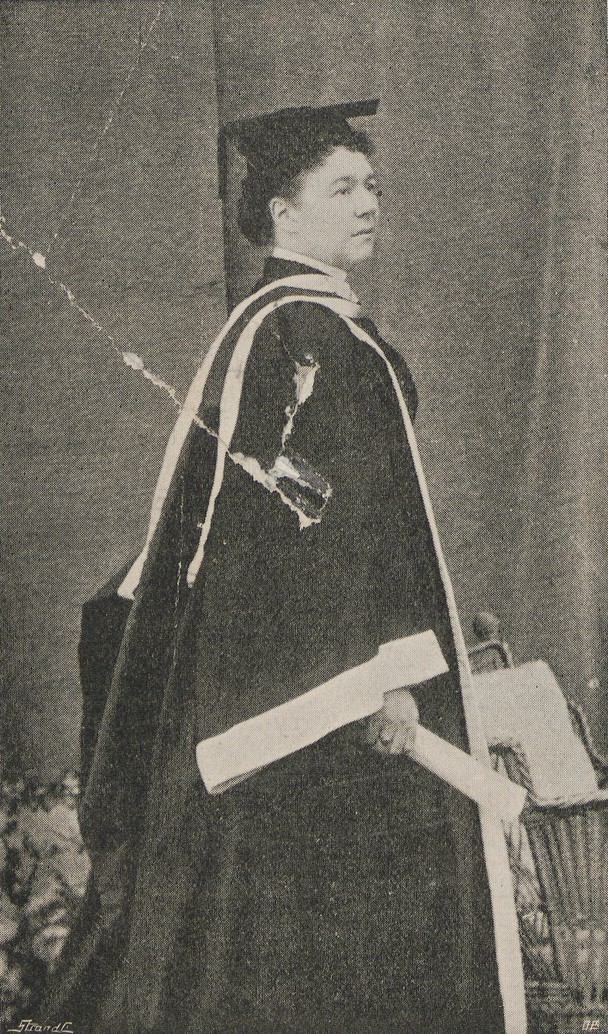
Lady Aberdeen was the first woman to receive an honorary degree in Canada. She is shown here in Queen's University robes.

In 1894, she received the Freedom of Limerick; she received the Freedom of Edinburgh in 1928 and was invested Dame Grand Cross in the Order of the British Empire (GBE) in 1931.

The Lady-Aberdeen Bridge, which is the first bridge upstream to cross the Gatineau River, in Gatineau, Quebec, was renamed in her honour. After falling through the ice at the confluence of the Gatineau and Ottawa Rivers, Lady Aberdeen was rescued by locals.

Lady Aberdeen is credited with introducing the Golden Retriever to Canada; her father, Sir Dudley Coutts Marjoribanks, 1st Baron Tweedmouth, a Scottish aristocrat, is best known as the originator of the breed.

Aberdeen Avenue in Hamilton, Ontario, Canada, was named after Lord and Lady Aberdeen who lived on Bay Street South between 1890 and 1898. They presided over the opening of the Hamilton Public Library on 16 September 1890. Aberdeen Avenue in Toronto is also named after them. Aberdeen Street in Kingston, Ontario, is named for the couple; it is located near the Queen's University campus. Her popularity in Canada led to her being given 18 elaborate tea sets by the Canadian government. This gift was nothing to do with her title or marriage and was purely because of her own work and impact.

She was the first woman to be made an honorary member of the British Medical Association.

The Ontario Heritage Trust erected a plaque for Lady Aberdeen 1857–1939 on the grounds of Rideau Hall, 1 Sussex Drive, Ottawa. "Widely respected for her organizational skills and strong commitment to public service, Lady Aberdeen served as president of the International Council of Women from 1893 to 1939. During the Earl of Aberdeen's term as governor-general, she helped to form the National Council of Women of Canada." Lady Aberdeen was also named a National Historic Person with a plaque on Sussex Drive in Ottawa.

Robert Gordon University has a campus building on its Garthdee campus named after her.

Party political offices
Preceded by Catherine Gladstone	President of the Women's Liberal Federation; 1893–1894	Succeeded by Countess of Carlisle
Preceded by Countess of Carlisle	President of the Women's Liberal Federation; 1902–1906	Succeeded by Countess of Carlisle
