= Ashampstead =

Coordinates: 51.49°N 1.19°W

- Village and Civil parish
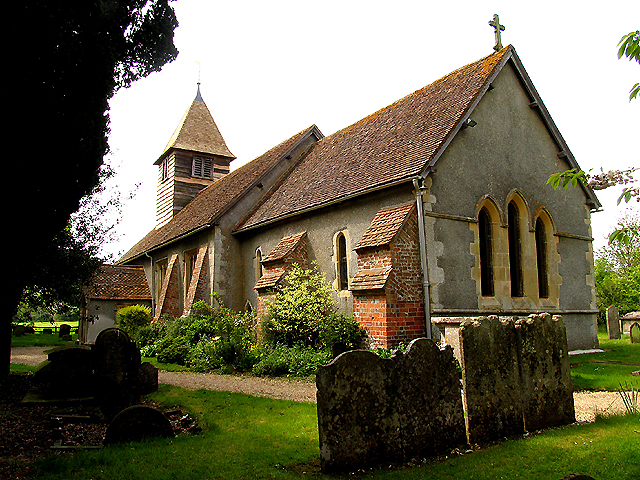
- St. Clement's parish church

- Location within Berkshire
- Population: 398 (2001 census); 392 (2011 Census)
- OS grid reference: SU5676
- Unitary authority: West Berkshire
- Ceremonial county: Berkshire
- Region: South East
- Country: England
- Sovereign state: United Kingdom
- Post town: Reading
- Postcode district: RG8
- Dialling code: 01635
- Police: Thames Valley
- Fire: Royal Berkshire
- Ambulance: South Central

Ashampstead is a small village and civil parish in the rural area between Reading, Newbury and Streatley in Berkshire, England. The parish population is about 400, occupying some 150 dwellings.

== History ==
The village was called Esshamstede in the 13th and 14th centuries. The Church of England parish church of Saint Clement dates from the 12th century. It has 13th century frescoes and a 15th-century wooden bell turret. It is believed the frescoes may have been painted by monks from the nearby Reading Abbey. The only remaining bell dates from 1662.

== Notable people ==
- The composer Henry Balfour Gardiner bought Field House, Ashampstead Green in 1909, moved in after alterations in 1911, and stayed until 1930. Many musicians, including Bax, Delius, Percy Grainger, Holst and Peter Warlock visited him there. The orchestral piece A Berkshire Idyll was completed there on 28 July, 1913.

== See also ==
- List of places in Berkshire
- List of civil parishes in England

== Sources ==
- Page, William; Ditchfield, P.H., eds. (1923). Victoria County History: A History of the County of Berkshire, Volume 3. pp. 449–452.
- Pevsner, Nikolaus (1966). The Buildings of England: Berkshire. Harmondsworth: Penguin Books. p. 70.
