= Haddo House =

House in Aberdeenshire, Scotland

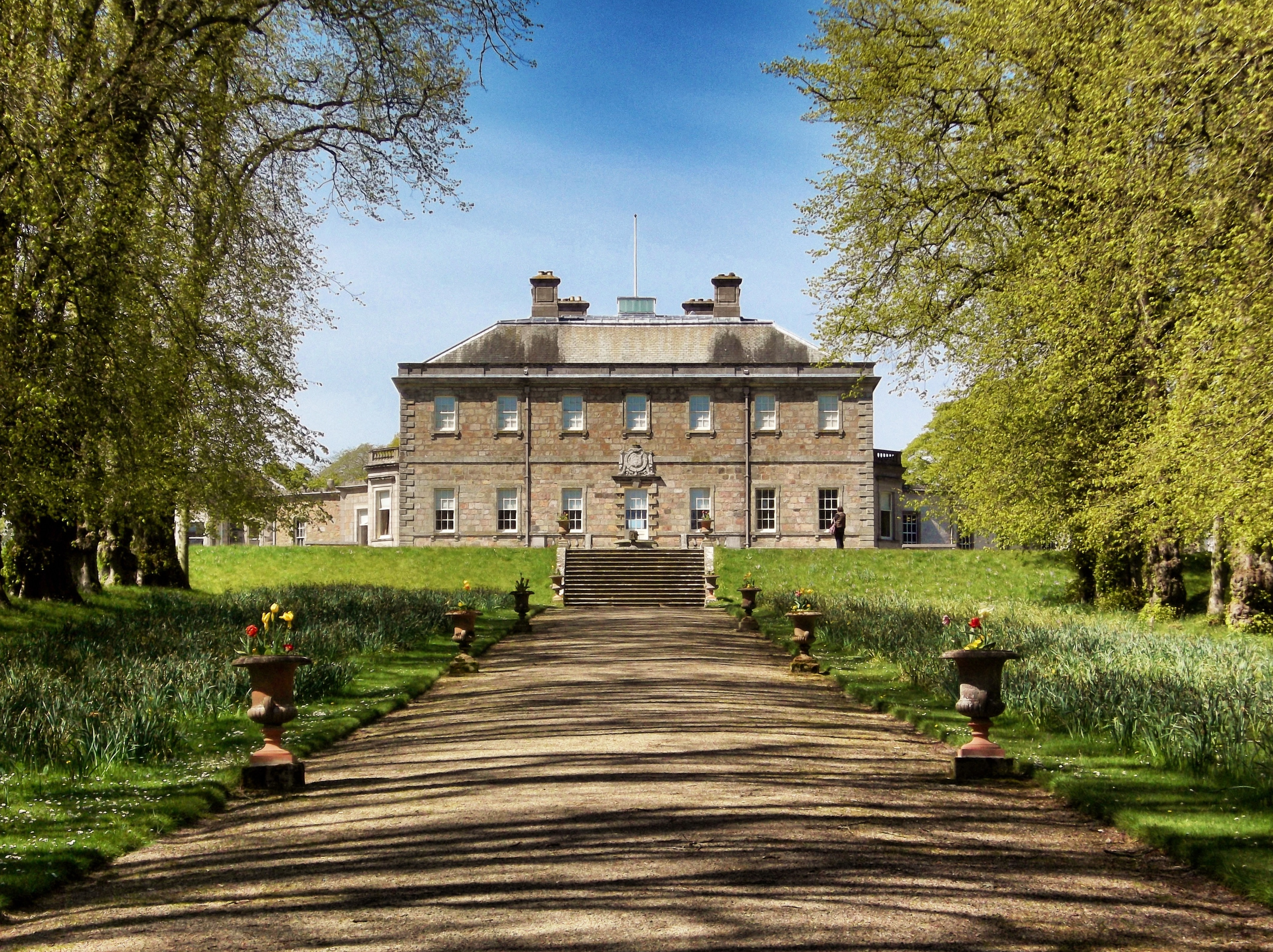

- Location within Scotland

General information
- Location: Near Tarves in Aberdeenshire
- Coordinates: 57.4030°N 2.2204°W
- Completed: 1732
- Owner: National Trust for Scotland

Design and construction
- Architect: William Adam

Website
- Official website

Inventory of Gardens and Designed Landscapes in Scotland
- Official name: Haddo House
- Designated: 1 July 1987
- Reference no.: GDL00206

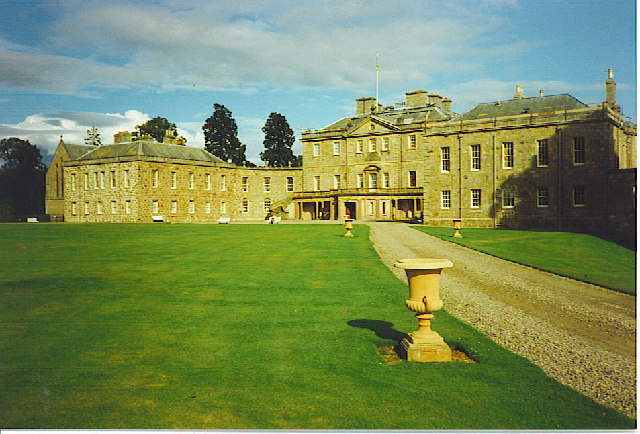
West front with chapel at extreme left

Haddo House is a Scottish stately home located near Tarves in Aberdeenshire, approximately 20 miles (32 km) north of Aberdeen (grid reference NJ868347). Completed in 1732 to designs by William Adam, it was the former seat of the Earls and Marquesses of Aberdeen and Temair and has been owned by the National Trust for Scotland since 1979.

== Establishment and architectural style ==
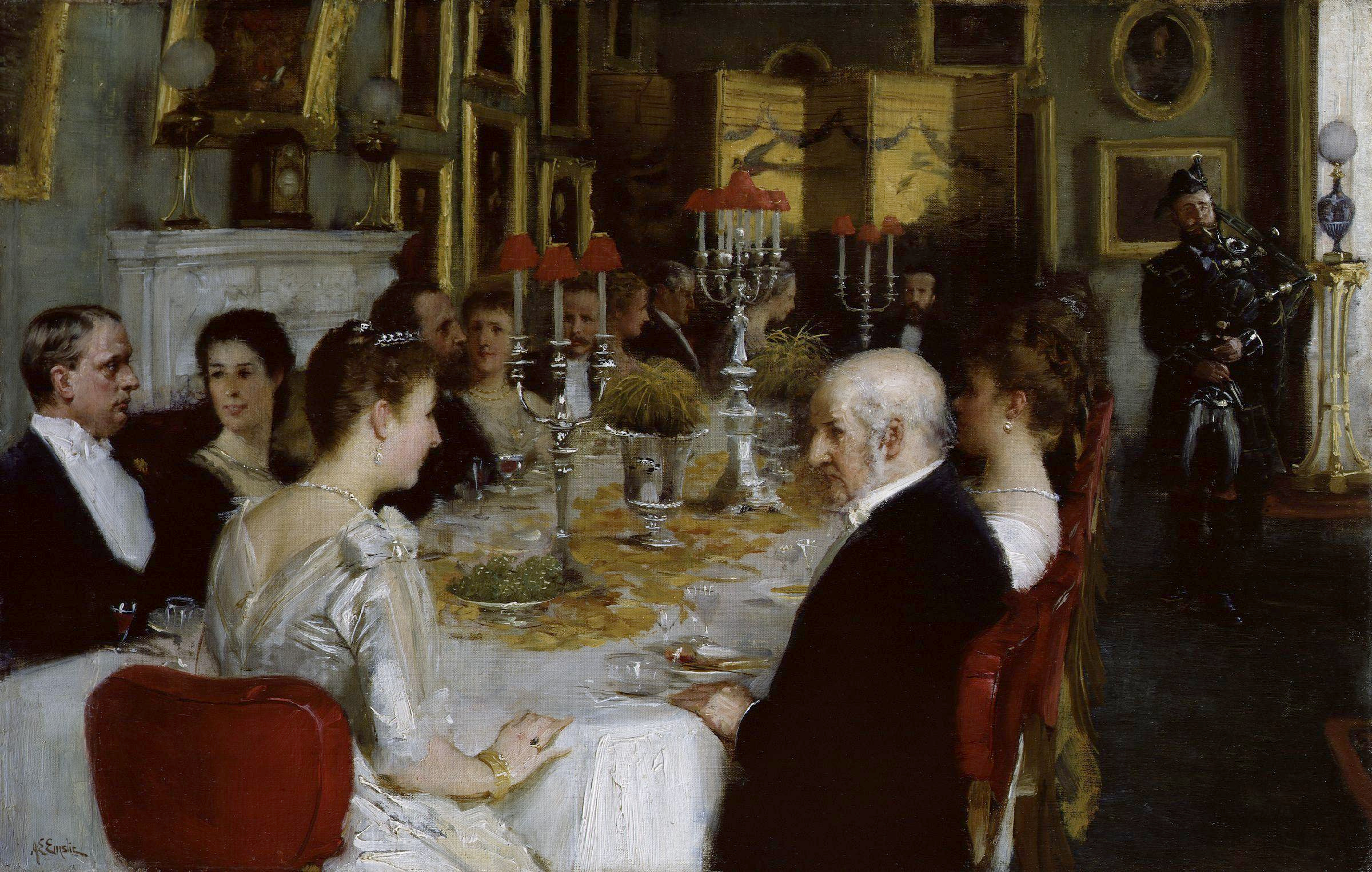
Dinner at Haddo House, 1884 portrait by Alfred Edward Emslie

The Gordons, who later became the Earls of Aberdeen and Marquesses of Aberdeen, lived on the site for more than 500 years. Haddo House sits in or near the site of the old Kellie Castle, the family's previous dwelling which was burnt down by the Covenanters. Dating from 1732, it was designed by William Adam in the Georgian Palladian style. The interior of the house is late Victorian in style, having undergone refurbishment in 1880 by Wright and Mansfield. Haddo contains a large art collection, including a series of 85 castles by James Giles and an early work by Claude Lorrain.

== Gardens and designed landscape ==
The grounds of Haddo House are included in the Inventory of Gardens and Designed Landscapes in Scotland and were designated in 1987. The designed landscape is recognised as an outstanding example of 18th- and 19th-century landscape design, associated with William Adam, the artist James Giles, and George Hamilton-Gordon, 4th Earl of Aberdeen. It comprises an extensive country estate with large-scale parkland, woodland policies, avenues and water features, and makes a major contribution to the scenic character of the surrounding area.

== Dinner service ==
A specially made display cabinet contains the Cabot Commemorative State Dinner Service. The hand-painted porcelain service with twenty-four settings for an eight-course meal was made by members of the Woman's Art Association of Canada in 1897. The Canadian government declined to pay the CAD$1,000 asking price. It was purchased privately by members of the House and Senate of Canada and presented on 12 June 1898 to Lady Aberdeen on the occasion of her husband, John Hamilton-Gordon, 1st Marquess of Aberdeen and Temair, ending his term as Governor-General of Canada.

== Peripheral buildings ==
John Smith did the design work for the kitchens and peripheral buildings in 1843. He returned there in 1845 and built the gatehouses at the North and South entrances. Constructed in coarse, rough granite, these single-storey buildings are in a Tudor style.

== Prime ministerial residence ==
Haddo House's most notable former resident was George Hamilton-Gordon, 4th Earl of Aberdeen, who served as Prime Minister of the United Kingdom from 1852–1855.

== World War II hospital ==
Another notable period in its history was during World War II when the house became a maternity hospital for the evacuated mothers of Glasgow. Nearly 1,200 babies were born at Haddo Emergency Hospital, as it was known, and many of these 'Haddo Babies' still come back to visit.

== Theatre ==
The house has a small chapel attached. In the grounds is a theatre, Haddo House Hall, and rehearsal rooms, known as the Peatyards. Haddo House Choral & Operatic Society (HHCOS), a large and vibrant choral society formed in 1945, has its operations base there. For over sixty years it has been noted for its annual musical and operatic productions.

== Damage by Storm Arwen ==
In 2021, around 100,000 trees were destroyed during Storm Arwen. It is estimated that it will take a generation for the estate to return to its pre-storm way.
