= The Most Honourable =

Form of address

The honorific prefix "The Most Honourable" is a form of address that is used in several countries. In the United Kingdom, it precedes the name of a marquess or marchioness.

== Overview ==
In Jamaica, Governors-General of Jamaica, as well as their spouses, are entitled to be styled "The Most Honourable" upon receipt of the Jamaican Order of the Nation. Prime Ministers of Jamaica, and their spouses, are also styled this way upon receipt of the Order of the Nation, which is only given to Jamaican Governors-General and Prime Ministers.

In The Bahamas, the style "The Most Honourable" is given to recipients of the Bahamian Order of the Nation.

In Barbados, recipients of the Order of Freedom of Barbados receive the style "The Most Honourable".

In Malaysia, the Prime Minister of Malaysia and the Chief Ministers of various Malaysian states are accorded the title Yang Amat Berhormat (literally "The Most Honourable" in Malay).

In addition, the names of some groups use this prefix, such as "His Majesty's Most Honourable Privy Council" in the United Kingdom.

== See also ==
- Style (manner of address)
- Forms of address in the United Kingdom
- The Honourable
- The Right Honourable
- The Right Excellent
- The Most Noble
- The Much Honoured
