= Forty Years On =

Forty Years On may refer to:

- Forty Years On (song), 1872 song
- Forty Years On (play), 1968 play
