= John Farmer (1835–1901) =

English composer, music teacher and organist

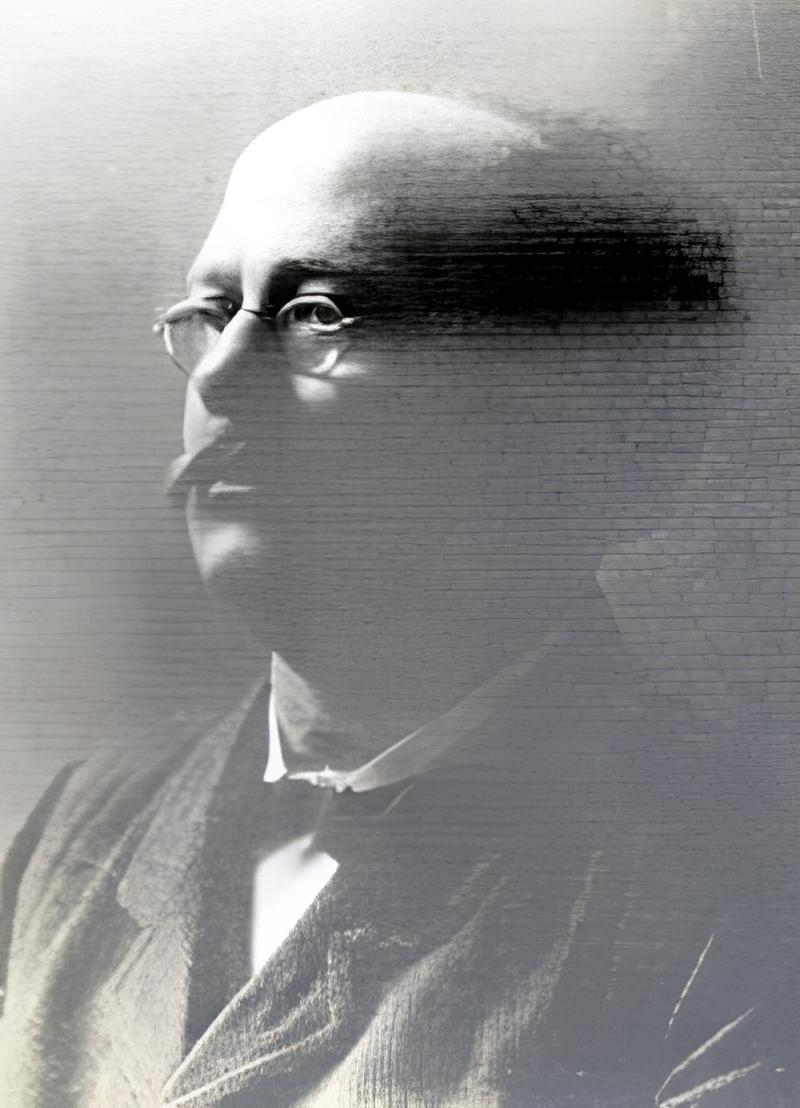
- John Farmer
- Born: John Farmer; 16 August 1835; Nottingham, Nottinghamshire, England
- Died: July 17, 1901 (aged 65); Oxford, Oxfordshire, England
- Body discovered: St Sepulchre's Cemetery
- Occupations: composer, music teacher, and organist
- Years active: Teacher at Harrow School (1862-1885) Organist at Balliol College, Oxford (1885-1900)

John Farmer (16 August 1835 – 17 July 1901) was an English composer, music teacher, and organist born in Nottingham.

== Life ==
His father, also named John (1812 – 1894), was a butcher and his mother, Mary, was a milliner. The eldest of four children, Farmer was recognised as child prodigy, playing violin, piano and harp. His uncle Henry Farmer (1819–1891) was also a conductor, composer, violinist, and organist in Nottingham. He owned a successful music-warehouse and nurtured his nephew's musical talent.

Between 1849 and 1852, Farmer studied piano at the Leipzig Conservatory with Ignaz Moscheles, after which he studied for a year in Coburg under Andreas Spaeth, a composer, organist, and clarinetist. Farmer returned to England to briefly work in his parents' millinery business, then travelled to Switzerland in 1853, marrying Mary Elizabeth Stahel (1840–1914) in 1859, the daughter of a Zurich schoolteacher, with whom he eventually had 7 children.

His daughter Mary was married to the Scottish classicist John Burnet.

Farmer suffered a stroke at Oxford in 1900 and died in July, 1901. He was buried at St Sepulchre's Cemetery, Oxford.

== Teacher at Harrow School, 1862-1885 ==
After teaching in Zurich for some years, John became music master and violin teacher at Harrow in 1862, reportedly appointed as a result of being noticed while giving piano demonstrations at the London International Exhibition. During his time at Harrow, he introduced 'house-singing' (still part of a new boy's 'initiation' into the school community) and composed many school songs and other larger vocal works for the education and enjoyment of students and staff. He encouraged the participation of the boys in massed singing for school events and the serious study of instrumental music. This was during a period when the inclusion of music within public school education in England was in its infancy and its acceptance was often resisted by school boards and principals. Affectionately known as "Sweaty John", Farmer also introduced the smoking concert, or "Tobacco Parliament", that was held on Founder's Day, where school songs and musical contributions were welcomed from staff, boys and friends, with Farmer's items particularly memorable - he was remembered as a "capital entertainer" according to John Ivimey. His songs continue to be published in modern editions of the "Harrow School Songs" book. The school song, “Forty Years On”, was written in 1872 with fellow teacher Edward Ernest Bowen as lyricist. He also composed cricketing ditties like "Willow the King," one of the most famous of all cricketing songs. His opera, "Cinderella" was performed at Harrow in 1883.

His pupils included Elsie Hall and Mary Louisa White.

== Organist at Balliol College, Oxford ==
Farmer left Harrow in 1885 to take up the post of Organist at Balliol College, Oxford. During his tenure, he founded the Balliol College Musical Society. His proposed Sunday evening concerts in the College Hall were initially controversial when the performances on the Sabbath were disapproved of by strict Sabbatarians. The Sunday evening concerts are still presented by the College Music Society.

While at Balliol Farmer composed Warwick School's first school song, Here's a Song For All, in 1892.

He championed the music of Bach, editing two volumes for school students, and his own oratorio "Christ and His Soldiers" was popular with smaller choirs. Most of Farmer's stage works were intended for amateurs, often youngsters.

== Compositions ==
- Christ and His Soldiers - 1878 - a children's oratorio
- Harrow School Songs - 1881
- Harrow School Marches - 1881
- Cinderella - c1883 - an opera
- The Pied Piper - n.d. - an opera
- Hunting Songs Quadrilles - for chorus and orchestra
- Nursery Rhymes Quadrilles - for chorus and orchestra
- The Harrow Songs and Glees - 1890
- Gaudeamus - 1890

Also some instrumental music, including a piano quintet and two septets for piano, flute and strings.
