= I. M. B. Stuart =

Anglo-Irish schoolmaster (1902–1969)

Ian Stuart
- Born: 18 September 1902
- Died: 3 August 1969 (aged 66)
- Other names: Stuart, I. M. B
- Occupations: Irish schoolmaster, rugby player, and author

Ian Malcolm Bowen Stuart (18 September 1902 – 3 August 1969), known as I. M. B. Stuart, was an Anglo-Irish schoolmaster, author and broadcaster in the United Kingdom who migrated to the United States in 1946.

In 1924 he played rugby for Ireland and also for the British Lions, and he later taught and wrote extensively on the game, which he introduced to Harrow School in 1927.

== Life ==
The son of William Henry Stuart, Estates Commissioner for Ireland, by his marriage to Florence Ann Bowen, Stuart was educated at Malvern and Trinity College, Dublin, which he represented at Rugby football, running, and tennis. He was a Medallist in History and political science at Trinity in 1924, graduating MA. His mother was related to Edward Ernest Bowen (1836–1901) a schoolmaster at Harrow and the author of the school song "Forty Years On".

From 1925 to 1927 Stuart was an assistant schoolmaster at St Paul's School, London, continuing to play rugby for Blackheath, then spent four years teaching at Harrow, having been recruited by Cyril Norwood to implement the introduction of Rugby football to the school. Between 1925 and 1932 Stuart wrote many articles for London newspapers and was a BBC Radio news commentator. He published books on rugby in 1926 and 1930. He was Joint Principal of Marcy's, in Chancery Lane, from 1931 to 1933, then Headmaster of Beaminster Grammar School for two years. From 1935 to 1945 he was head of Portora Royal School, Enniskillen, and a Member of the Senate of Queen's University, Belfast.

Migrating to the United States, Stuart served as Director of Student Guidance at Mercersburg Academy in Pennsylvania from 1947 to 1949, then was Director of the Alabama Educational Foundation for four years before joining the Southern States Industrial Council as Director of Public Relations and Education for a further four years. He was Director for Community Relations at the Florists Telegraph Delivery Association from 1957 to 1964.

In his The Theory of Modern Rugby (1930), Stuart complains that the English invented most of the world's games, but lack the ability to win at them. He concluded that "the spirit of the game is the prize".

Stuart married Barbara Millar, of Weybridge, Surrey, and they had one son and two daughters.

== Books ==
- A Text Book on Rugby Football (1926)
- The Theory of Modern Rugby Football (London: Macmillan, 1930)
- Reminiscences of a Public School Boy (London: 1932, with William Nichols Marcy)
- Matriculation English History, 1485–1815 (London: Heinemann, 1934)
- Scenes Selected from Shakespeare (1934)
- The Simplified Shakespeare Series, ed. (London: 8 volumes)
- Thoughts for Johnny (Vulcan Press, 1954)
- Radio Talks (American Book & Publishing Company, 1964)

== Honours ==
- Royal Humane Society parchment for gallantry
- Freedoms Foundation Award, 1960
- Douglas MacArthur Medal, 1964
- Daughters of the American Revolution Medal, 1966
- Congress Freedom Medal, 1966
