= The Grove, Harrow School =

Boarding house of Harrow School

The Grove
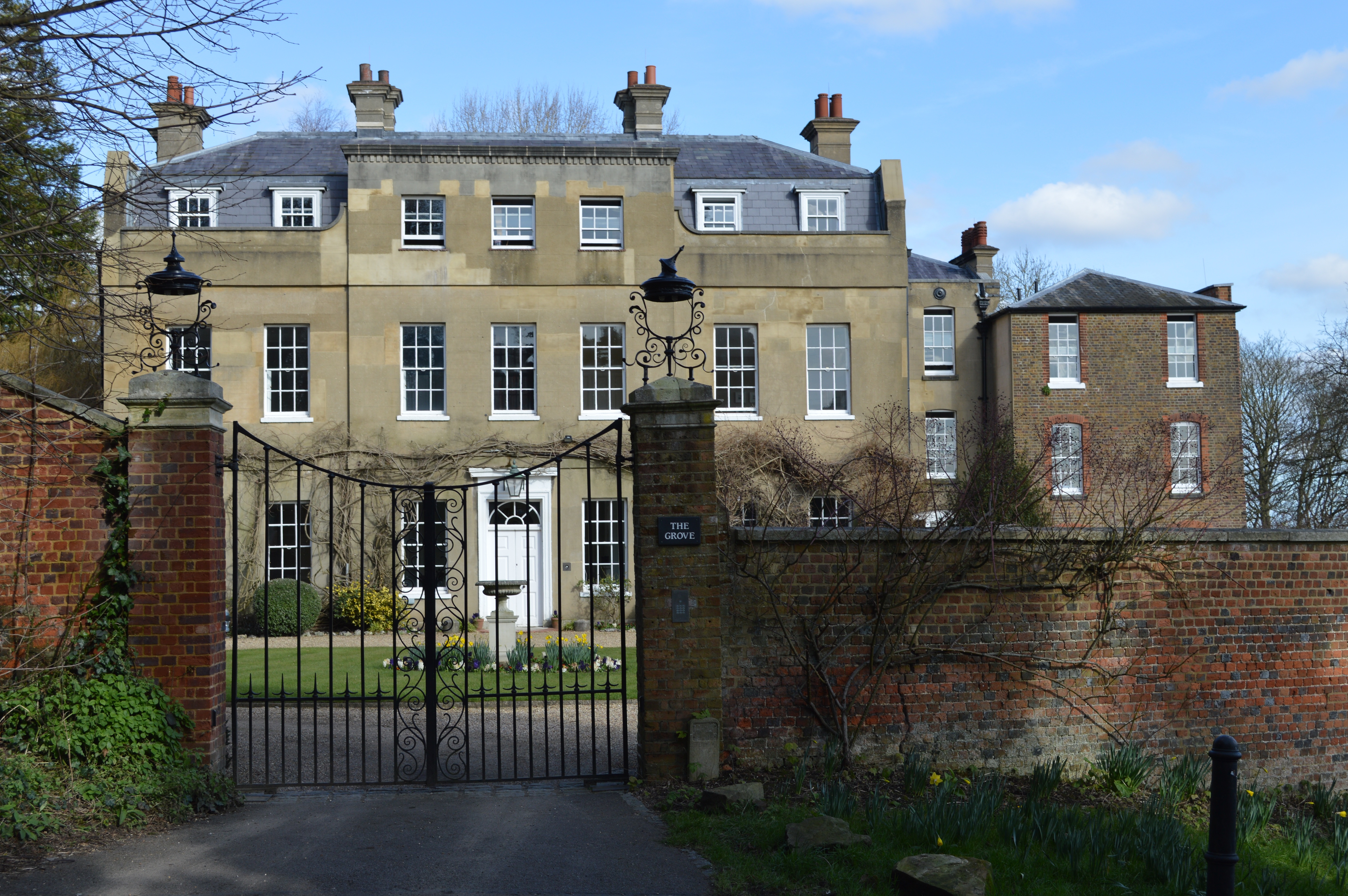
- The Grove, photographed in 2016
- Interactive map of the The Grove area

General information
- Type: Boarding House
- Location: 1 Church Hill, Harrow on the Hill HA1 3HN, London, United Kingdom
- Coordinates: 51°34′28″N 00°20′11″W
- Completed: ~1750
- Owner: Harrow School

Technical details
- Floor count: 4

Listed Building – Grade II
- Official name: The Grove
- Designated: 20 September 1951
- Reference no.: 1192932

Listed Building – Grade II
- Official name: Gates and Garden Wall to the Grove Fronting Road
- Designated: 24 May 1983
- Reference no.: 1079740

The Grove (/ðəˈɡrəʊv/), is a boarding house for Harrow School, in Harrow on the Hill, Greater London, England. The Grove was converted into a boarding house in 1820 and is a Grade II listed building. It was constructed on the site of a rectory manor to St Mary's Church, Harrow on the Hill which was built around 1094. The original construction date is unclear, but according to its listed building entry, it dates back to the mid-18th century.

== History ==
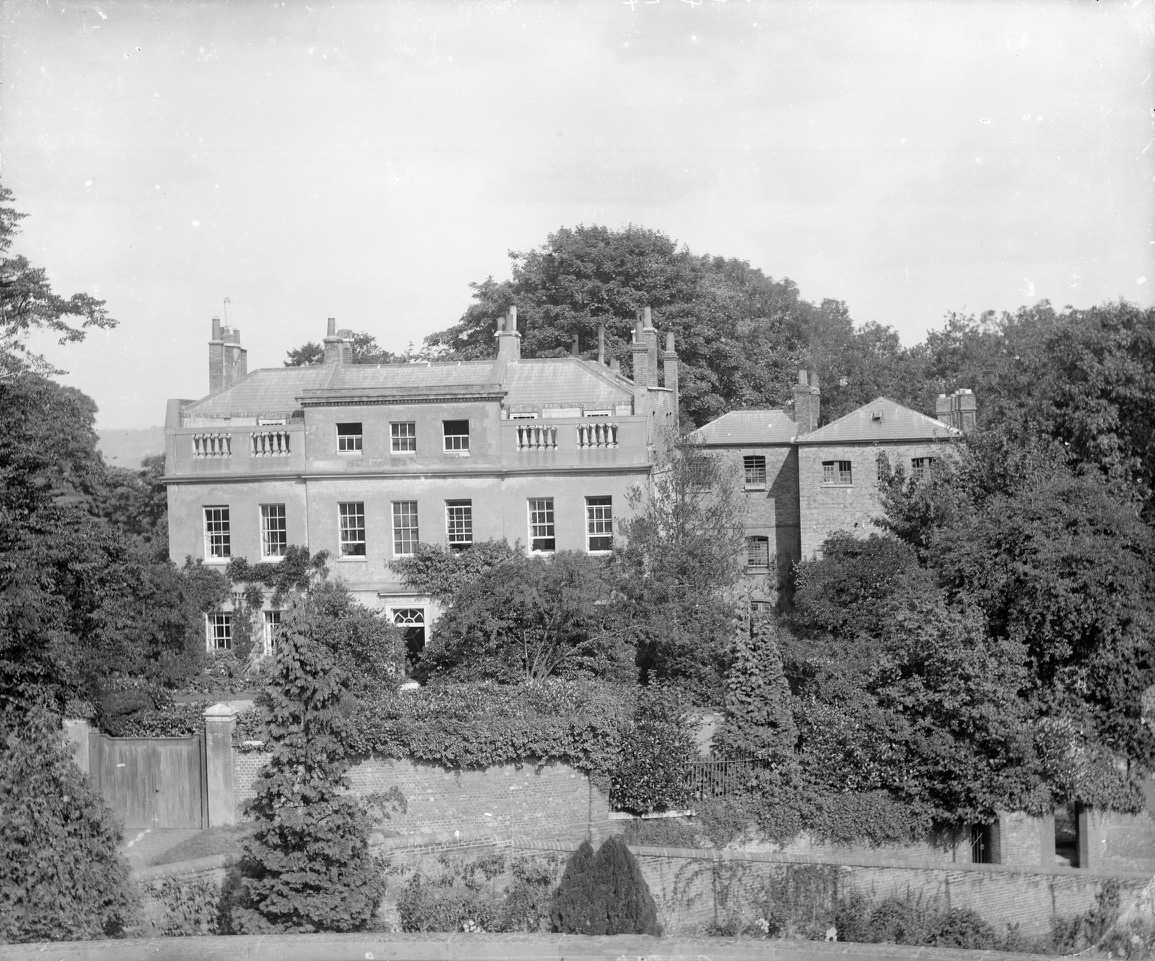
The Grove in 1901

The Grove was initially constructed on the site of a rectory manor for St Mary's Church, Harrow on the Hill around the mid-18th century. The previous rectory served as a manor house for several Archbishops of Canterbury.

Between 1778 and 1784, playwright and politician Richard Brinsley Sheridan was a resident of the house alongside his wife, Elizabeth Ann Linley.

In 1820, S.E. Batten purchased the building for £5,125 (~£620,000 in 2024), named it 'The Grove', and commissioned it as a boarding house for Harrow School.

In 1830, following Batten's death, Benjamin Hall Kennedy, English scholar and schoolmaster, became housemaster.

In 1833, the house experienced a fire, and most of the house burned down, leaving only the front facade and a few cellars. The house was rebuilt in 1836.

Rev. T.H. Steel was the longest-serving housemaster of the Grove, serving 37 years from 1836 to 1881.

Edward Ernest Bowen, founding member of the Football Association became housemaster in 1881 and purchased the house from the Batten family for fourteen thousand pounds. Bowen refurbished the house, establishing single rooms for almost all boys resident in the manor, making the Grove the first house in Harrow to have single rooms.

Following Bowen's death in 1901, the house was bequeathed to Harrow School.

In 1915, boys from another boarding house of Harrow School, the Church Hill House, moved to The Grove, combining them.

In 1974, another fire broke out on the top floor of the building, lit by a pupil who had obtained petrol and set it on fire. £100,000 of damage was caused.

In September 2016, the Grove started a refurbishment campaign that added new common rooms, a new entrance, new accommodation for the assistant housemaster and matron, as well as a new tutors' room for one-to-one support. It was completed in 2020, in time for The Grove's 200th anniversary as a boarding house.

The house celebrated its 200th anniversary as a boarding house in 2020.

== Boarding House ==
The Grove is one of Harrow School's 12 boarding houses. It houses around 70 boys. The current housemaster is Alastair Cook, the deputy housemaster is R. R. McMahon, and the Matron is Maxine Sears. The Grove's House colours are currently red and blue.

=== Notable Grovites ===
- Richard Brinsley Sheridan (Born 1751): Writer, playwright, and politician.
- Francis Cowper, 7th Earl Cowper (Born 1834): British Liberal politician, Lord Lieutenant of Ireland.
- Sir George Otto Trevelyan (Born 1838): British statesman and author.
- George Macaulay Trevelyan (Born 1876): British historian and academic.
- Walter Monckton (Born 1891): lawyer, politician, and advisor to Edward VIII.
- Sir Lancelot Royle (Born 1898): Olympic athlete, businessman, and Harrow School Governor.
- Victor Rothschild, 3rd Baron Rothschild (Born 1910): British WWII intelligence officer, adviser to the Thatcher and Heath governments, and biologist.
- Sir John Mortimer (Born 1923): British barrister, dramatist, screenwriter and author.
- Sir Anthony Royle, Baron Fanshawe of Richmond (Born 1927): Politician, businessman, and former member of the SAS.
- Sir Evelyn de Rothschild, (Born 1931): Financier, chairman of N M Rothschild & Sons.
- General Sir Peter de la Billière (Born 1934): former director of the SAS and commander-in-chief of the British Army.
- Sir Jeremy Greenstock (Born 1943): British former diplomat, former Permanent Representative of the United Kingdom to the United Nations
- Maro Itoje (Born 1994): International rugby player for England.
