= Robert James (headmaster) =

Robert Leoline James C.B.E. (27 September 1905 – 14 May 1982) was High Master of St Paul's School from 1946 to 1953 and headmaster of Harrow School from 1953 to 1971.

== Biography ==
James was the son of Henry Lewis James, who was Dean of Bangor from 1934 to 1940. He was educated at Rossall School and Jesus College, Oxford, where he obtained a first-class degree in Literae Humaniores. He was also awarded a doctorate by the University of London. He was a housemaster at St Paul's School and taught classics from 1928 to 1939. In 1939, he became headmaster of Chigwell School before returning to St Paul's as High Master in 1946. In 1953, he became headmaster of Harrow School and on his death it was said that the prestige of the school had "seldom stood higher" than it had during his 18-year period in office. He was regarded as friendly and approachable, and was a traditionalist rather than an innovator. He twice hosted visits to the school by Elizabeth II and was awarded the CBE in 1971. He died on 14 May 1982 in Oxford at the age of 76.

Married 1939 Maud Eliot Gibbons. Two recorded sons.

Academic offices
Preceded by Walter Fraser Oakeshott; 1938 - 1946	Head Master of St Paul's School; 1946 - 1953	Succeeded by Antony Newcombe Gilkes; 1953 - 1962
Preceded by Ralph Westwood Moore; 1942 - 1953	Head Master of Harrow School; 1953 - 1971	Succeeded by Brian Michael Stanislaus Hoban; 1971 - 1981
