= Ernest Walker (composer) =

English composer (1870–1949)

Ernest Walker (15 July 1870 – 21 February 1949) was an Indian-born English composer and writer on music, as well as a pianist, organist and teacher.

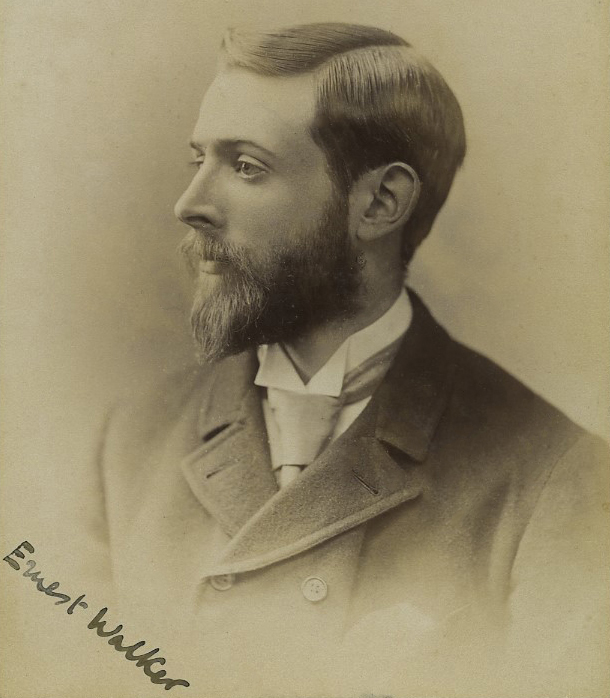
Ernest Walker, composer

== Biography ==
Ernest Walker was born in Bombay, India, in 1870, where his father was a partner in a merchant firm (his father had also had ambitions to be a writer, and even published two novels under the pseudonym "Powys Oswyn", but these plans were abandoned). Ernest came to England with his parents in 1871. From an early age he exhibited a mystic attraction to nature. He studied the piano with Ernst Pauer and harmony with Alfred Richter (a son of the cantor at St Thomas's Church, Leipzig). Through a mutual friend, he became friendly with Harold Bauer (then still only a violinist) and the two would often play duos together. He was educated at Oxford, becoming a Doctor of Music in 1898. There, his mystical bent was fostered and became more pronounced.

He was assistant organist at Balliol College from 1891 to 1901, and organist from 1901 to 1913 (resigning only because he felt his private views on religion were incompatible with the religious nature of the texts sung by the choir, even though there was no requirement that the organist profess Christian beliefs). He remained at Oxford for the rest of his life, and died there. He was director of music at Balliol from 1901 to 1925 and organised the Sunday chamber music concerts there, at which he often appeared as a pianist. He arranged appearances at these concerts by artists such as the baritone Harry Plunket Greene, the tenors Steuart Wilson and Gervase Elwes, the pianists Fanny Davies, Leonard Borwick and Donald Tovey, the violinists Adolf Busch and Jelly d'Arányi, and the violist Lionel Tertis. These concerts often featured works then hardly known in England, such as César Franck's Violin Sonata in A major, and songs by Joseph Marx and Richard Strauss. He was for many years an examiner and member of the Board of Studies for music, and he did much to improve the standard of the B.Mus and D.Mus degrees. He encouraged many promising musicians, among them the Australian Frederick Septimus Kelly, who was killed in World War I, and Donald Tovey, who became his lifelong friend. Tovey dedicated his Balliol Dances for piano duet to Ernest Walker.

He championed the music of Hugo Wolf and Claude Debussy, and introduced some of Johannes Brahms's late works to England (the piano pieces, Op. 117, and the Rhapsody from Op. 119). He also played for the first time in England some Scriabin and Debussy piano pieces, Max Reger's Aus meinem Tagebuch, and Sergei Rachmaninoff's Prelude in C sharp minor.

Walker had a great reputation as an accompanist, and played for artists such as Pablo Casals, on one occasion in 1898 performing together for Queen Victoria at Osborne House. As late as 1947, Casals wrote to Walker expressing his admiration for the musicianship he had displayed almost 50 years earlier. He also accompanied Joseph Joachim in concert; Joachim later wrote to Walker to express his gratitude for the quality of his playing. Privately, he played violin sonatas with Albert Einstein.

He edited the Musical Gazette, a quarterly publication, from 1899 to 1902. He wrote the Beethoven number of the Music of the Masters series (1905). He wrote a number of articles for the 2nd edition of Grove's Dictionary of Music and Musicians (1902). He wrote articles and critiques for The Times and Manchester Guardian, and wrote program notes for concerts. His most important literary work is History of Music in England (1907, rev. 1923; rev. 1952 by Jack Westrup). In 1996, the musicologist Paul Henry Lang wrote of it:

A particular position must be assigned to Ernest Walker, the author of A History of Music in England (1907); stand-offish, wildly unjust and unforgiving, Walker's assertions are so sweeping and extravagant that it would be a waste of space to discuss them. To put it bluntly, he was an eccentric, continually inconsistent, and often irresponsible. Sir Jack Westrup, in his new edition (1952), toned down the worst aspects of the work, but then it is no longer Walker.

Walker's essays written over a 30-year period were collected in Free Thought and the Musician (1946), in which he explains his philosophical, religious and mystical views. Although he is described as a man of unfailing integrity and kindliness, he was a man of strong prejudices: he condemned Victorian music, such as Arthur Sullivan ("disgraceful rubbish") and John Stainer's The Crucifixion, and he dismissed all medieval music as "pre-artistic".

Among Walker's students were Herbert Murrill, Reginald Jacques, Victor Hely-Hutchinson, Sir Thomas Armstrong, Graham Peel, Sir William McKie, Robert Still, and Gervase Hughes.

He resigned as Director of Music at Balliol College to devote himself to composition. In 1942 the Cobbett Gold Medal of the Worshipful Company of Musicians was conferred on him. He died in 1949, aged 78. He was mourned by many, and those who paid tribute to him included Albert Schweitzer.

== Music ==
Ernest Walker's style as a composer is conventional and conservative. It was described by The Manchester Guardian as not particularly distinguished but sensitive in expression and technically skilful. After 1914 his chromatic harmony became much more pronounced. The majority of his music is written for voices – many choral pieces (partsongs, anthems and motets), songs, and vocal duets and quartets. His works include a Stabat Mater (1898), I will lift up mine eyes, Op. 16, No. 1 (1899), Hymn to Dionysus, Op. 13 (1906), Ode to a Nightingale, Op. 14 (1908; words by John Keats), and One generation passeth away, Op. 56 (1934). There is also vocal incidental music to Rhesus (attrib. Euripides; 1922; sung to a Greek text).

He wrote little orchestral music and no concertante works. His major orchestral work was Fantasia-Variations on a Norfolk folksong, Op. 45 (1930; also exists as a piano duet). His chamber music includes: a piano trio, 2 piano quartets, a piano quintet, a horn quintet, a Minuet and Trio for 2 violins and piano, and a Fantasia for string quartet.

He also wrote other instrumental music: 2 violin sonatas (1895, 1910); a viola sonata (1897); a cello sonata (1914); Variations on an Original Theme for viola and piano (1907); Variations on a Theme by Joseph Joachim for violin and piano (1918); and other pieces for piano with violin, viola, cello, clarinet or horn.

His solo piano music consists mainly of short pieces, miniatures, album leaves, preludes and the like. There is also Variations on a Norwegian Air, Op. 4 (1894), the suite The Days of the Week (1904), a West African Fantasietta, Op. 63 (1935), and a Study for the Left Hand, Op. 47. He arranged the Allegro assai from Felix Mendelssohn's String Quartet in F minor, for piano solo. For piano duet, he wrote Six Duettinos, Op. 39 (1926), a West African Fantasia, Op. 53 (1933), and a Rhapsody and Fugue, Op. 57 (1934). There is also a Waltz Suite, Op. 60 (1935) for two pianos. He wrote cadenzas for five Mozart piano concertos, and for Beethoven's Piano Concerto No. 3.

He wrote two solo pieces for piano left hand, composed long before he met the left-handed pianist Paul Wittgenstein and became friendly with him: Study for the Left Hand, Op. 47 (1901); and Prelude (Larghetto), Op. 61. He later presented these to Wittgenstein. In 1933 he wrote a piano quintet specifically for Wittgenstein and dedicated it to him. This was the Variations on an Original Theme for clarinet, violin, viola, cello and piano left hand. It was premiered by Wittgenstein on 24 March 1935 in Vienna.

Only two works for organ came from his pen: a Prelude and Fugue in D, Op. 23 (1908), and Ten Preludes on the Lady Margaret Hall Hymn-tunes, Op. 50 (1923). This last work has been described as among the few significant contributions to English organ music of the 20th century. The Ten Preludes also exist in a choral version (Op. 51).

Some of his music has been recorded: the Cello Sonata; the Adagio for Horn and Organ; and some of his choral pieces.

== List of works ==
Stage

- Rhesus, Incidental Music to the play by Euripides for male chorus, Op. 35 (1923)

Orchestral

- Lyrics for string orchestra (1892)
- Concert Overture in F minor (1897)
- Intermezzo for string orchestra (2 clarinets ad libitum) and piano, Op. 22 (1908)
- Ground for string orchestra (1911)
- Fantasia-Variations on a Norfolk Folk Song, Op. 45 (1930); original version for piano 4-hands

Chamber music

- Piano Trio in C minor for violin, cello and piano (1896)
- Ballade in D minor for violin and piano, Op. 6 (1896)
- Sonata No. 1 in A minor for violin and piano, Op. 8 (1895); published 1898
- Romance in B♭ major for viola (or clarinet) and piano, Op. 9 (1898)
- Quartet in D major for violin, viola, cello and piano (1899)
- Quintet in B♭ minor for horn, 2 violins, viola and cello (1900)
- Ballade in F major for cello and piano, Op. 11 No. 1 (1900)
- Adagio in E♭ major for cello (or horn) and piano, Op. 11 No. 2 (1900)
- Minuet and Trio for 2 violins and piano, Op. 20 (1904)
- Romance and Caprice for violin and piano (1904)
- Quintet in A major for 2 violins, viola, cello and piano (1905)
- Variations on an Original Theme for viola and piano (1907)
- Quartet in C minor for violin, viola, cello and piano (1910)
- Sonata in C major for viola and piano, Op. 29 (1897); published 1912
- Variations on an Original Theme for clarinet, violin, viola, cello and piano left-hand (1913); written for Paul Wittgenstein
- Fantasia in D major for string quartet, Op. 32 (1923)
- Variations on a Theme of Joseph Joachim for violin and piano, Op. 40 (1918); published 1927
- Sonata in F minor for cello and piano, Op. 41 (1914); published 1928
- Sonata No. 2 in E♭ major for violin and piano, Op. 44 (1910); published 1930
- The Londonderry Air, Arrangement for violin and piano, Op. 59 (1935)

Organ

- Prelude and Fugue in D, Op. 23 (1908)
- Ten Preludes on the Lady Margaret Hall Hymn-Tunes, Op. 50 (1932); also for chorus, Op. 51

Piano

- Rhapsody in G minor (1892)
- Variations on a Norwegian Air, Op. 4 (1894)
- Romance and Capriccio, Op. 5 (1895)
- Album Leaf No. 1 (1895)
- Mazurka (1897)
- Intermezzo in Tenths (1897)
- Album Leaf No. 2 (1898)
- The Days of the Week, 7 Short Pieces (1904); No. 1 published as Op. 37
- Prelude in E♭ major, Op. 37 (1904); published 1925; used in the variation movement of Violin Sonata, Op. 44
- 6 Duettinos for piano 4-hands, Op. 39 (1926)
- 3 Dedications, Op. 42 (1929)
- Easter Piece, Op. 43 (1929)
- Fantasia-Variations on a Norfolk Folk-Song for piano 4-hands, Op. 45 (1930); also orchestrated
- 4 Miniatures, Op. 46 (1931)
- Study for the Left Hand for piano left-hand, Op. 47 (1901); published 1931; written for Paul Wittgenstein
- 3 Fughettas, Op. 49 (1932)
- A West African Fantasia for piano 4-hands, Op. 53 (1933)
- Christmas Piece, Op. 54 (1933)
- Rhapsody and Fugue for piano 4-hands, Op. 57 (1932); published 1934
- A Waltz Suite for 2 pianos, Op. 60 (1935)
- Prelude for the Left Hand, Larghetto for piano left-hand, Op. 61 (1935); written for Paul Wittgenstein
- West African Fantasietta, Op. 63 (1935)

Vocal

- Brown Is My Love, Madrigal for 5 voices (1893)
- From the Upland and the Sea for baritone, 2 violins, viola, cello and piano (1894); words by William Morris
- A Message for voice and piano (1894); words by G. H. F. Cookson
- Le Tsigane dans la lune for voice and piano (1894); words by Jean Lahor
- Why So Pale and Wan? for voice and piano (1895); words by John Suckling
- 6 Songs for medium voice and piano, Op. 1; words by William Shakespeare and Ludwig Uhland
- 3 Songs for voice and piano (1898); words by Olga von Gerstfeldt
- 6 Two-part Songs for 2 female voices and piano, Op. 2 (published 1898); words by Robert Herrick, William Shakespeare and Percy Bysshe Shelley
- 6 Songs for voice and piano, Op. 3 (1893); words by William Shakespeare, Robert Burns, Alfred, Lord Tennyson, Heinrich Heine and Karl Candidus
- 6 Two-part Songs for 2 female voices and piano, Op. 7 (1897); words from Songs of Innocence and of Experience by William Blake
- The Wind on the Wold for high voice and piano (1902); words by William Ernest Henley
- Three War Songs for voice and piano (1902); words from The Princess by Alfred, Lord Tennyson
- 2 Duets for soprano, baritone and piano (1902); words by Robert Herrick and from an Elizabethan songbook
- 6 Songs for low voice and piano, Op. 12; words by Christina Rossetti, Olga von Gerstfeldt, Alfred, Lord Tennyson, Robert Herrick and Thomas Moore
- I Care Not for the Idle State, Anacreontic Ode for baritone and piano, Op. 15; words by Thomas Moore
- Corinna's Going A-Maying for voice and piano, Op. 18 (1902); words by Robert Herrick
- Camilla Fair for voice and piano (1903); words from an Elizabethan song-book
- 2 Songs for voice and piano, Op. 19 (1903); words by Henry Wadsworth Longfellow and Charles Kingsley
- Duets for alto and tenor (1904); words by Heinrich Heine
- Bluebells from the Clearings for voice and piano, Op. 21 (1906); words by William Ernest Henley
- 3 Songs for voice and piano, Op. 27 (1909); words from an Elizabethan manuscript and by Sydney Thompson Dobell
- To Althea for voice and piano (1909); words by Richard Lovelace
- Come into the Garden, Maud for voice and piano, Op. 28 (1911); words by Alfred, Lord Tennyson
- 5 Songs for voices and piano, Op. 36 (1924); words by Robert Greene, Ben Jonson, Thomas Ravenscroft, Beaumont and Fletcher, Mary Scott
- Songs with Small Orchestra for high voice and small orchestra (or piano), Op. 38 (1926); words by Sydney Thompson Dobell
- Ring Out, Wild Bells, Canon for two equal voices and piano, Op. 64 (1937); words by Alfred, Lord Tennyson

Choral

- Psalm 130 "De Profundis" for soloists, chorus and orchestra (1892)
- Stabat Mater for 4 solo voices, mixed chorus and orchestra (1897)
- 5 Songs for 4 voices and piano, Op. 10 (1900); words from Englands Helicon (1600)
- A Hymn to Dionysus for mixed chorus and orchestra, Op. 13 (1906); words by Euripides
- Ode to a Nightingale for baritone solo, clarinet solo, mixed chorus and orchestra, Op. 14 (1908); words by John Keats
- 2 Anthems for male voices and organ, Op. 16 (1899)

1. I Will Lift Up Mine Eyes (also for female voices and organ)
2. Lord, Thou Hast Been Our Refuge (also for mixed voices and organ)

- 6 Three-part Songs for 3 female voices and piano, Op. 17 (1901–1908)
- The Splendour Falls on Castle Walls for mixed chorus a cappella, Op. 24 (1906); words by Alfred, Lord Tennyson
- The World's Wanderers, Part-Song for 3 female voices and piano, Op. 25 (1906); words by Percy Bysshe Shelley
- Liberty, Part-Song for 4 male voices a cappella, Op. 26 (1906); words by Percy Bysshe Shelley
- Neptune's Empire, Choral Lyric for chorus and orchestra (1910); words by Thomas Campion
- 3 Part-Songs for 3 female voices a cappella, Op. 30 (1912, 1914); words by Robert Herrick
- In Pride of May, Part-Song for 3 female voices and piano, Op. 31 (1914); words from an Elizabethan songbook
- Orpheus with His Lute, Part-Song for mixed voices a cappella, Op. 33 (1922); words by William Shakespeare
- Full Fathom Five, Song for 6 soprano voices a cappella, Op. 34 (1923); words by William Shakespeare
- Soft Music, Part-Song for mixed chorus a cappella, Op. 48 (1931); words by Robert Herrick
- The Lady Margaret Hall Hymn-Tunes for chorus a cappella, Op. 51 (1932); also for organ
- The Earth Is the Lord's, Motet for female chorus a cappella, Op. 52 (1932)
- Sunset and Evening Star, Choral Song for mixed chorus a cappella, Op. 55 (1932); published 1934; words by Alfred, Lord Tennyson
- One Generation Passeth Away, Motet for mixed chorus a cappella, Op. 56 (1934); Biblical words from Ecclesiastes
- Hearken to Me, Ye That Follow after Righteousness, Motet for female chorus a cappella, piano or organ ad libitum, Op. 58 (1934); Biblical words from the Book of Isaiah
- Magnificat and Nunc Dimittis in D major for female voices and organ, Op. 62 (1935)
- Song from Schiller's "Wilhelm Tell" for voice and piano (1937); words by Friedrich Schiller
- Dirge in Woods for mixed chorus a cappella, Op. 65 (1939); words by George Meredith

== Sources ==
- Grove's Dictionary of Music and Musicians, 5th ed. 1954
- Lang, George Henry (1996). George Frideric Handel. New York Dover. OCLC 255703394.
- Margaret Deneke, Ernest Walker, 1951
