= Alastair Land =

British schoolmaster

- Born: William Martin Alastair Land; September 24, 1971 (age 55); Manchester
- Education: Manchester Grammar School
- Alma mater: University of Cambridge (BA, PGCE)
- Employer(s): Eton College; Winchester College; Repton School; Harrow School; Budhanilkantha School
- Website: www.harrowschool.org.uk/Senior-Management-Team

William Martin Alastair Land (born 24 September 1971) is a British schoolmaster who has been the Headmaster of Harrow School since 2019, previously having been the Headmaster of Repton School. He has taught at Eton College and Winchester College, where he was Master in College, and was Deputy Headmaster at Harrow School before moving to Repton School.

== Early life and education ==
Born in Manchester in 1971, the son of solicitor Martin and Elaine Land (formerly Lightfoot), Land was educated at Manchester Grammar School and Trinity College, Cambridge, where he graduated with first-class honours in the Natural Sciences Tripos in 1994, then gained a Postgraduate Certificate in Education (PGCE).

In a gap year between leaving school and arriving at Cambridge, Land taught Geography and Science at the Budhanilkantha School in Kathmandu, Nepal, where he developed a love of extreme sports and travel.

== Career ==
Land's first teaching job after qualifying was at Eton College, where he was a master from 1994 until 2003, teaching biology, coaching rugby, directing plays, and becoming Commanding Officer of the school CCF. In September 2003 he moved on to Winchester, where he was Master in College and led natural history expeditions, as well as chairing the Adventurous Training Committee, refereeing football, and serving as running coach. Next, from 2012 to 2015 he was deputy head master at Harrow, before being appointed as head of Repton School in 2016.

In April 2019 he was appointed as Head Master at Harrow.
