= Harrow School =

Public school in Harrow, Greater London, England

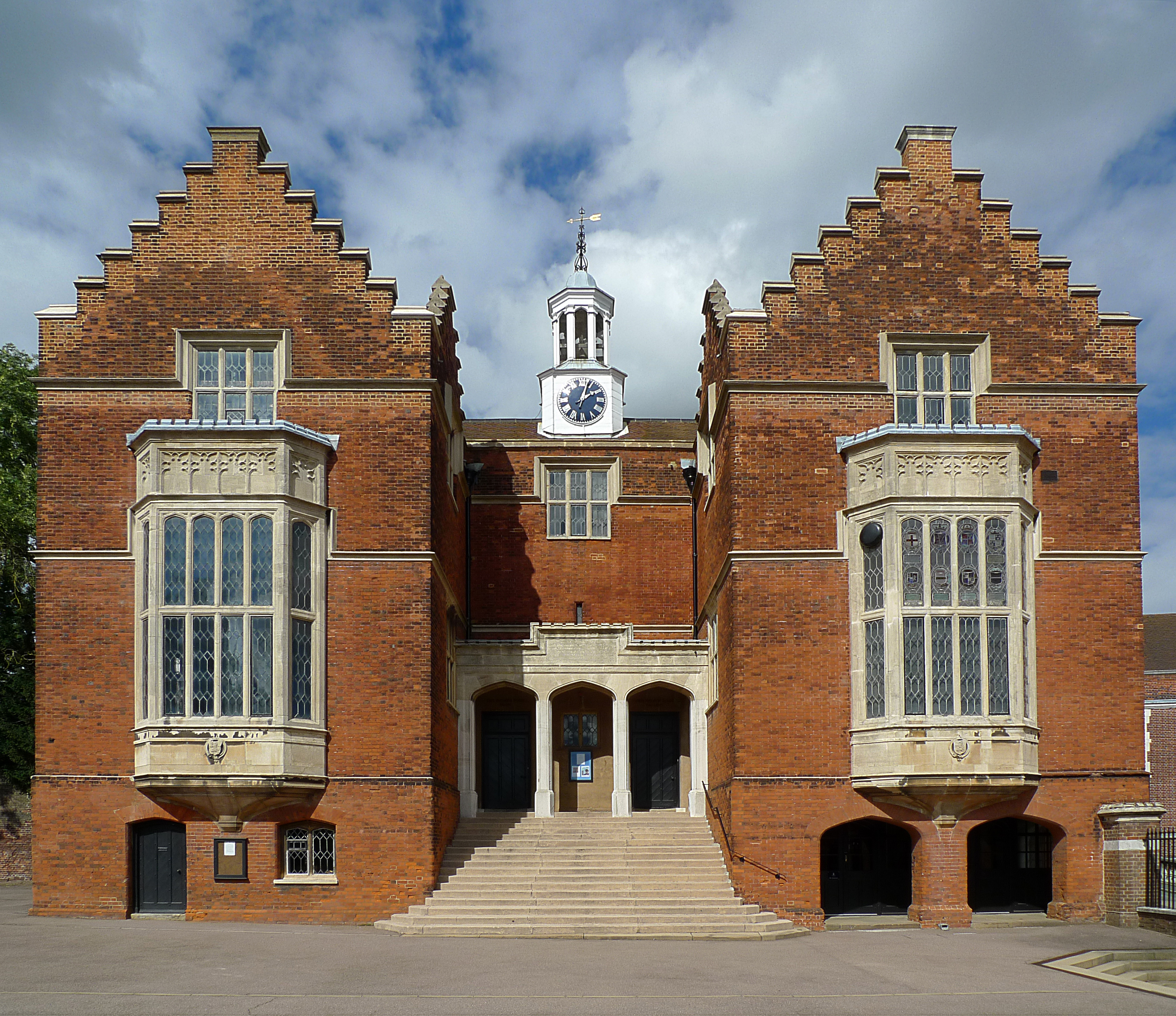
- The Old Schools photographed in 2013

Location
- 5 High Street, Harrow on the Hill; London Borough of Harrow, Middlesex, HA1 3HP; England; 51°34′21″N 00°20′06″W

Information
- Type: Private school Boarding school
- Mottoes: Latin: Stet Fortuna Domus (Let the Fortune of the House Stand); Latin: Donorum Dei Dispensatio Fidelis (The Faithful Dispensation of the Gifts of God)
- Religious affiliation: Church of England
- Established: 1572; 454 years ago (Royal Charter)
- Founder: John Lyon of Preston
- Department for Education URN: 102245 Tables
- Chairman of the Governors: J P Batting
- Head Master: Alastair Land
- Staff: ~150 (full-time)
- Gender: Male
- Age: 13 to 18
- Enrollment: ~830 pupils
- Houses: 12
- Colours: Blue and white
- Song: "Forty Years On"
- Publication: The Harrovian
- School fees: £46,710
- Alumni: Old Harrovians
- Badges: The Harrow Lion; The Silver Arrow
- Website: www.harrowschool.org.uk

Harrow School (/ˈhæroʊ/) is a public school for boys providing boarding school facilities in Harrow on the Hill, London. The school was founded in 1572 by John Lyon, a local landowner and farmer, under a royal charter of Queen Elizabeth I.

As of July 2026, the school reported an enrolment of 833 boys, all of whom board full-time, in twelve boarding school houses. It was one of the seven public schools selected for reform in the Public Schools Act 1868. Harrow's uniform includes morning suits, straw boater hats, and top hats and canes for School Monitors.

Its list of distinguished alumni includes seven former British prime ministers: Aberdeen, Spencer Perceval, F.J. Goderich, Robert Peel, Henry Palmerston, Stanley Baldwin and Winston Churchill, as well as the former Indian Prime Minister Jawaharlal Nehru; numerous former and current members of both Houses of the UK Parliament, several members of the Mountbatten-Windsor family, royal families, three Nobel laureates, twenty Victoria Cross holders, and many prominent figures in the arts and sciences.

== History ==
=== The Foundation ===
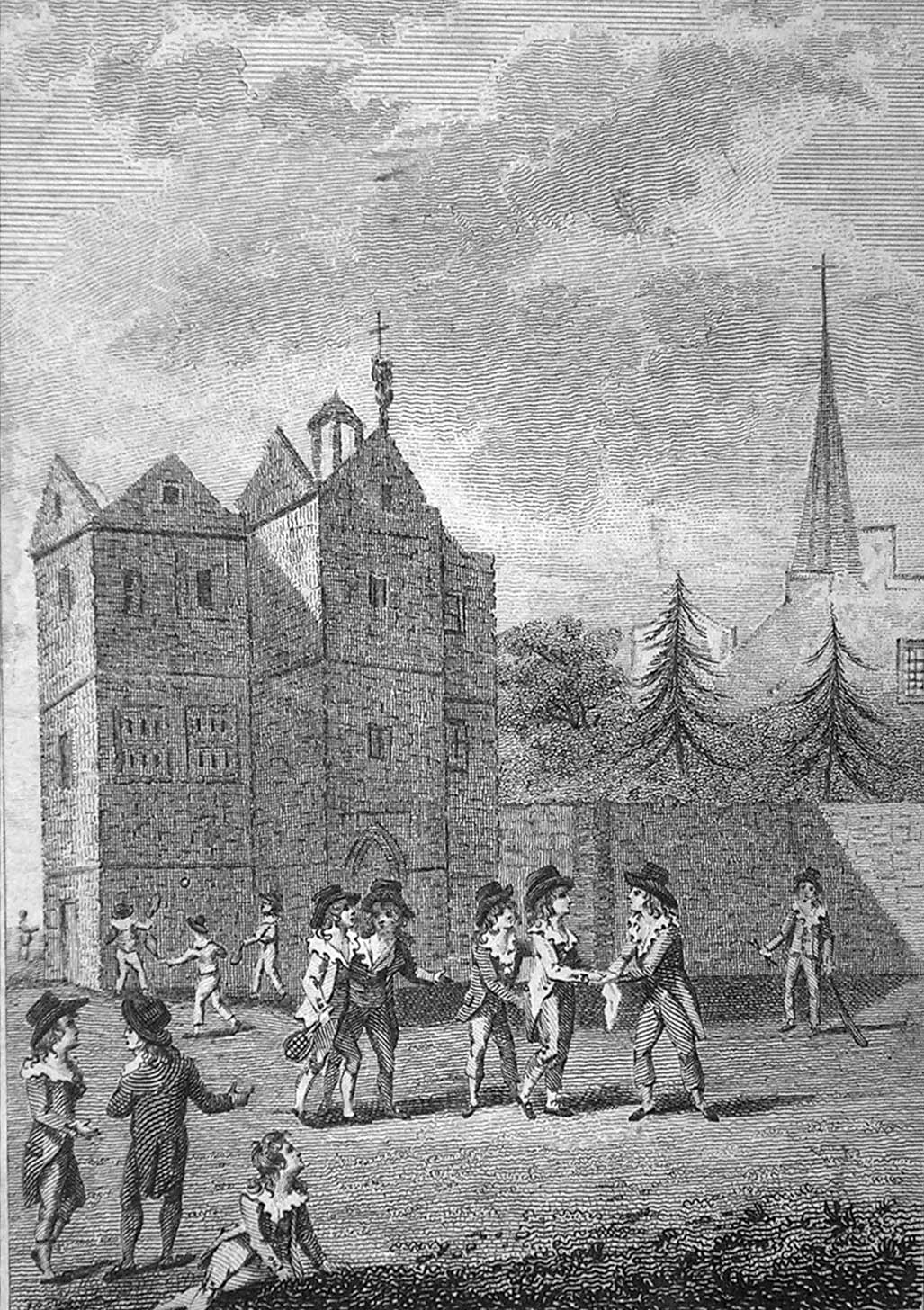
The original Old Schools at background, as they were in 1795

The school was founded in February 1572 under a royal charter granted by Queen Elizabeth I to John Lyon, a wealthy local farmer. The school's formal name is still 'The Free Grammar School of John Lyon within the town of Harrow-on-the-Hill'. The charter described this as a re-endowment, and there is some evidence of a grammar school at Harrow in the mid-16th century, but its location and connection with Lyon's foundation are unclear. Evidence for earlier schools, possibly connected with the chantry of St Mary (established in 1324), is weak. In the original charter six governors were named, including two members of the Gerard family of Flambards, and two members of the Page family of Wembley and Sudbury Court.

The founder John Lyon died in 1592, bequeathing his estate to two beneficiaries: the school and the maintenance of two roads, the Harrow Road and the Edgware Road, both going to London, 10 miles (16 km) away. The Road Trust received by far the greater share, the school's share providing just for the salary of The School Master and some minor provisions. This situation, reasonable at the time because of the need to transport merchandise to market, continued until 1991 when the considerable assets of the Road Trust were reassigned to John Lyon's Charity, a charity to provide educational benefits for the inhabitants of the boroughs through which the roads pass. It was only after the death of Lyon's wife in 1608 that the construction of the first school building began. Known as the Old Schools, it was completed in 1615.

John Lyon's school was founded to provide free education for 30 (later extended to 40) poor boys of the parish. However, the School Master was permitted to accept "foreigners" (boys from outside the parish) from whom he received fees. It was the need for foreigners to find accommodation that led to the concept of boarding. As in all schools of the time, education was based on the languages and culture of the ancient civilisations of Rome and Greece.

As the reputation of the school grew through the 19th century, the number of foreigners increased, but the local families became increasingly reluctant to impose on their children a classical education and the number of free scholars declined. In 1825 there were 17 free scholars and 219 foreigners. In 1876 the Lower School of John Lyon was founded under the authority of the Governors of Harrow School to provide a modern education for local boys. It is now known as The John Lyon School and is a prominent independent school; it remains part of the Harrow School Foundation.

=== Buildings and grounds ===
The Old Schools remains largely the building of 1615, although it was extended and re-designed by Charles Robert Cockerell in 1818. It is a Grade I listed building. The majority of the school's boarding houses were constructed in Victorian times, when the number of boys increased dramatically. The Speech Room by William Burges (1877), the chapel (1855) and Vaughan Library (1863), both by George Gilbert Scott, and the War Memorial building (1926), designed by Herbert Baker to mark the loss of former pupils in the First World War, are all Grade II* listed buildings. A total of 27 school buildings are Grade II listed, including the Headmaster's House (1843) by Decimus Burton; the Museum Schools [Butler Museum] (1886) by Basil Champneys; and the Music Schools (1890) by Edward Prior.

The school owns Harrow Park, the remnant of a medieval estate, Flambards, which in the 17th century was the largest house in Harrow. In the 18th century both Capability Brown and Henry Holland worked on landscaping the park. In 1831, a part of the estate was bought by the Reverend W. W. Phelps, a master at the school, and it has subsequently been developed to provide accommodation and sporting facilities, including the school's private golf course. The park is listed at Grade II on the Register of Historic Parks and Gardens of Special Historic Interest in England.

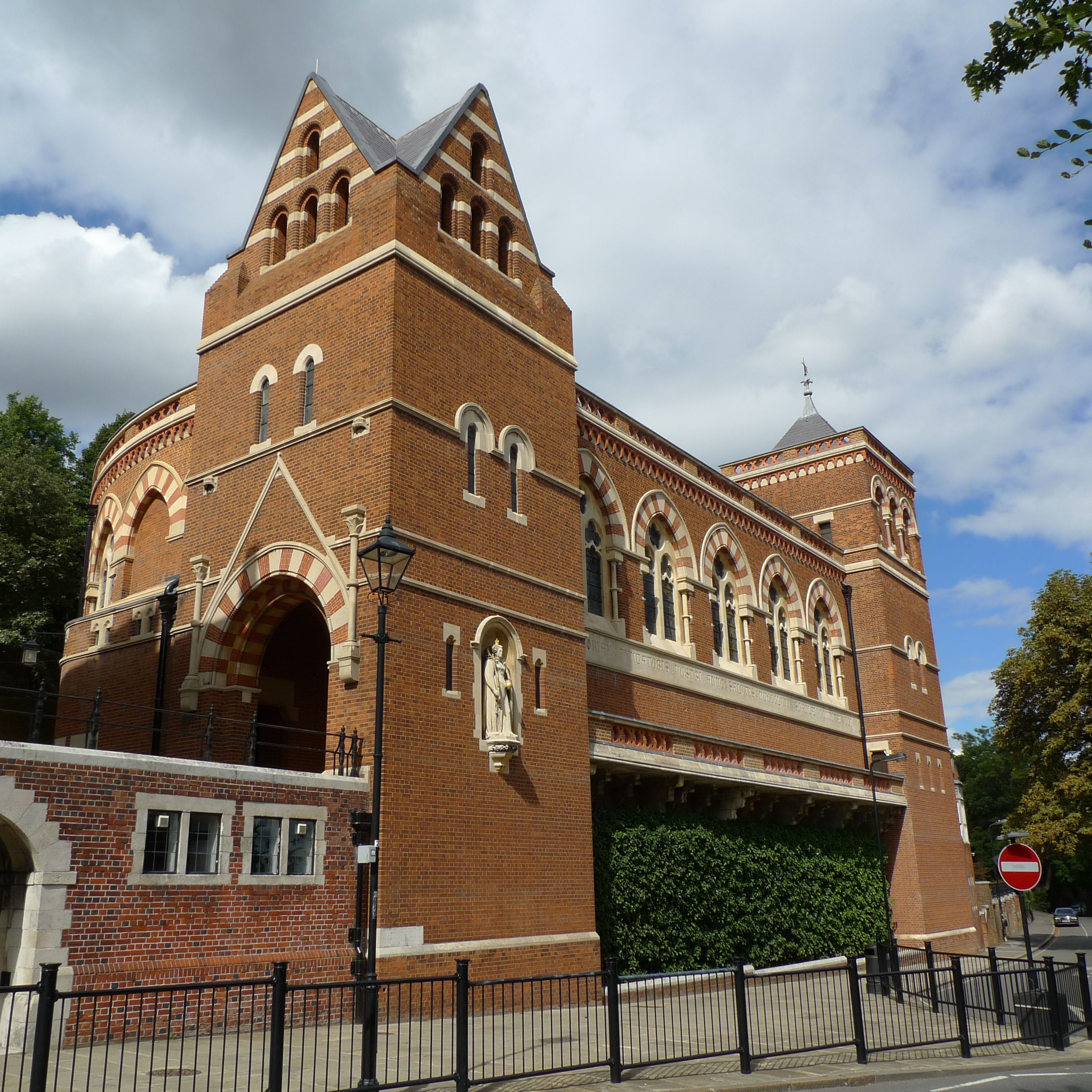
Speech Room

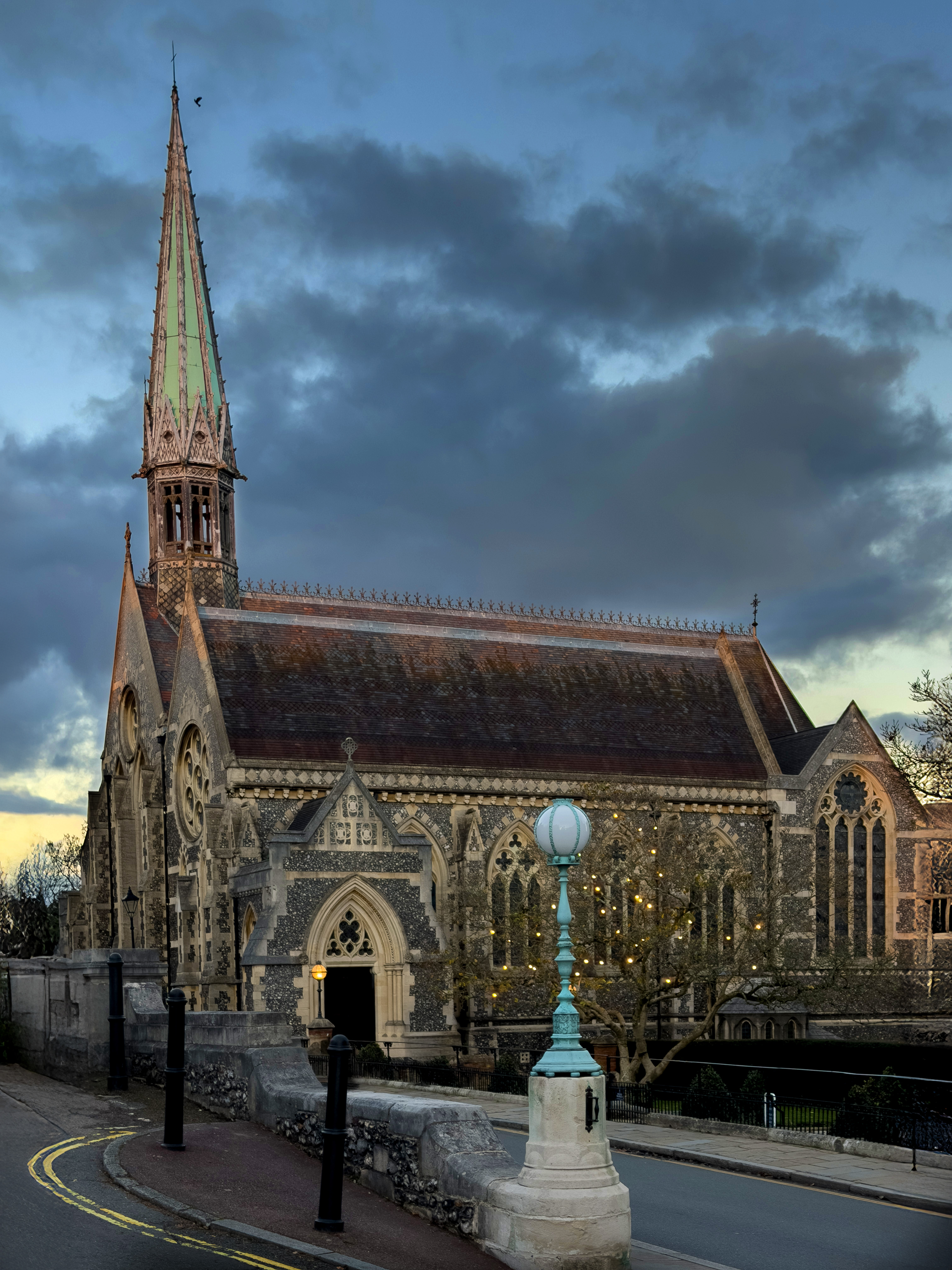
Chapel

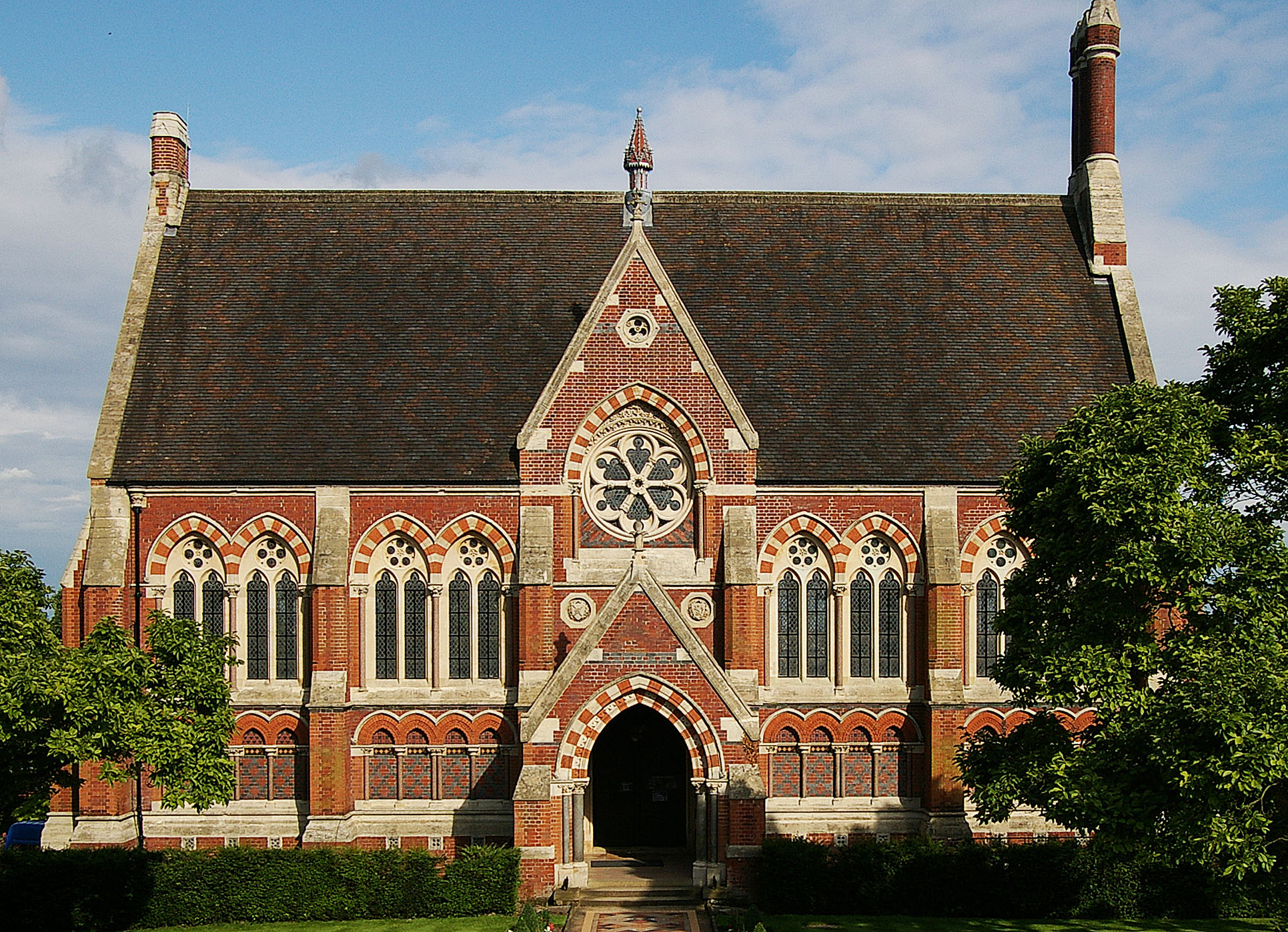
Vaughan Library

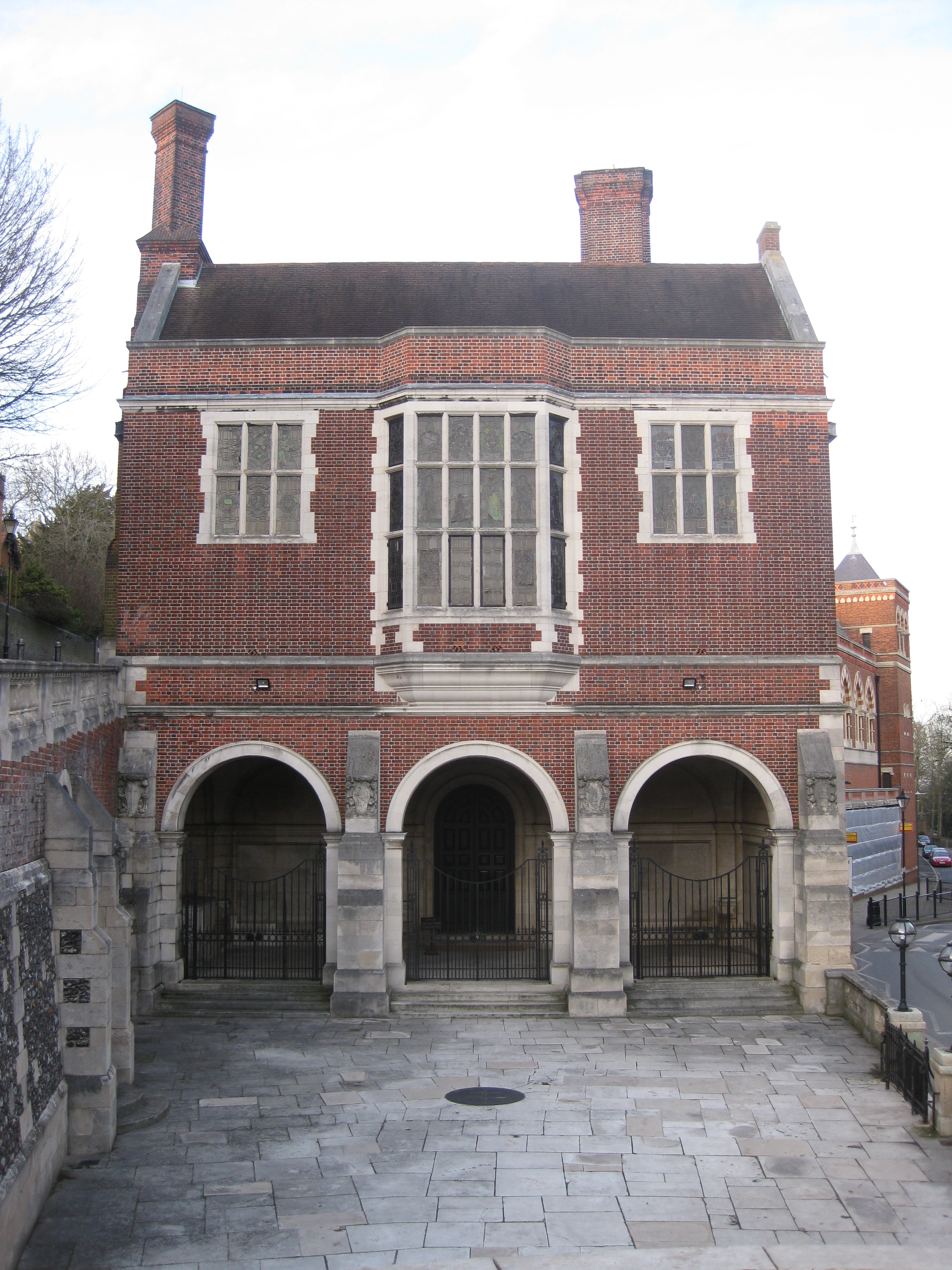
War Memorial Building

== School traditions ==
=== Harrovian Blue ===
The school colour of navy blue, usually called Harrovian Blue, is used for uniforms and sports kits. The colour Oxford Blue is said to have been inspired by Harrovian Blue. This goes back to the first university boat race in 1829, when the Oxford colours were chosen by two crewmembers, Charles Wordsworth and Thomas Garnier, both of whom previously attended Harrow School.

=== Uniform ===
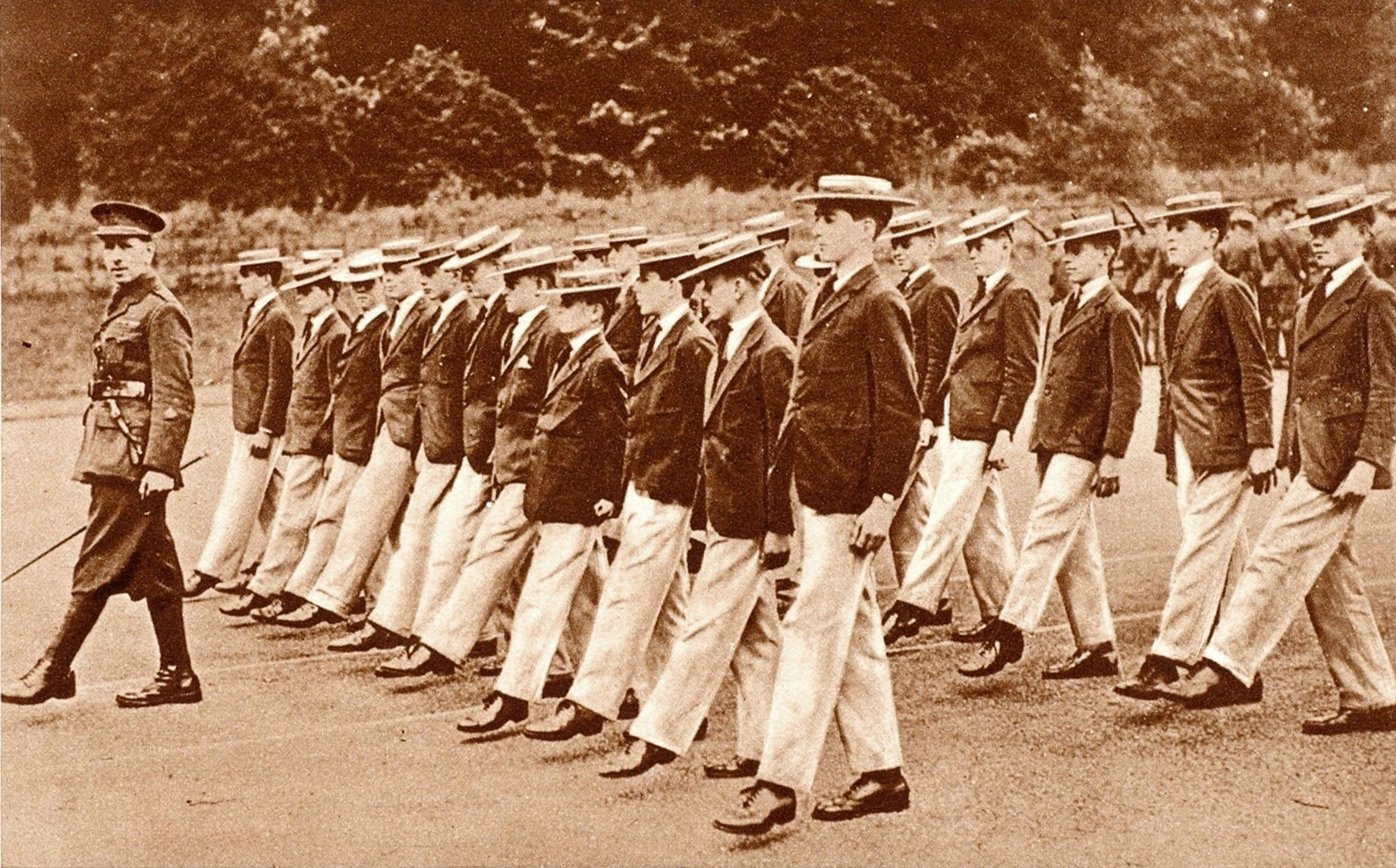
Students in 1927

Everyday dress for boys at Harrow consists of a dark blue jacket known as a "bluer" with light grey trousers known as "greyers". With these are worn a white shirt, black tie, black shoes and an optional blue jumper. Boys also wear a Harrow hat, a straw hat with a dark blue band similar to a boater, but shallower in crown and broader in brim. The School blue-and-white woollen scarf and dark blue woollen overcoat may be worn in cold weather. Variations include boys who are monitors (prefects) who are allowed to wear a jumper of their choice of colour, and members of certain societies who may earn the right to replace the standard school tie with one of a variety of scarves, cravats, neckties and bow ties of their society.

Sunday dress, which is worn every Sunday up to lunch and on special occasions such as Speech Day and songs, consists of a black tailcoat, a black single-breasted waistcoat and striped trousers, worn with a white shirt and black tie. Boys with sports colours may wear a grey double-breasted waistcoat; members of the Guild (a society for boys who have achieved distinction in art, music or drama) may wear maroon double-breasted waistcoats with maroon bow ties; members of the Philathletic Club (a society for boys with achievements in sport) may wear black bow ties alongside grey double-breasted waistcoats. School monitors (prefects) may wear black double-breasted waistcoats and a top hat, and carry canes.

=== School houses ===
House name and Colours
Bradbys – Purple and White
Druries – Red and Black
Elmfield – Purple and Black
Gayton – (over-spill house)
The Grove – Red and Blue
The Headmaster's – Pink and White
The Knoll – Gold and Black
Lyon's – Green and Black (
Moretons – White and Blue
Newlands – Yellow and White
The Park – Red and White
Rendalls – Magenta and Silver
West Acre – Red, White and Blue

Harrow School divides its pupils, who are all boarders, into twelve Houses, each of about seventy boys, with a thirteenth house, Gayton, used as an overflow. Each House has its own facilities, customs and traditions, and each competes in sporting events against the others. Until the 1950s, there existed that were known as 'small houses' where only 5–10 boys stayed at one time while they waited for a space in a large house to become available (hence the use of the term large house in this article). A twelfth large house, Lyon's, was built in 2010. House Masters, Assistant House Masters and their families live in the boarding Houses and are assisted by House Tutors appointed from the teaching staff. The House Master oversees the welfare of every boy in his care; for parents, he is the main point of contact with the School. Each House has a resident matron and sick room. The matrons are supported by the School's Medical Centre where trained nursing staff offer round-the-clock care. The medical centre is under the direct supervision of the school doctor who is available on the Hill every day for consultation. There are no dormitories: a boy shares his room for the first three to six terms and thereafter has a room to himself.

=== Harrow Songs ===
The school has a book of songs, of which the best known is Forty Years On. In the 19th century, most schools had a school song, usually in Latin, which they sang at the beginning and end of term. Harrow had a master, Edward Bowen, who was a poet and a music teacher, and John Farmer, who was a composer. Between 1870 and 1885, these two wrote a number of songs about school life. The inspiring, wistful, amusing and thought-provoking words and the attractive tunes, made the songs very popular. Successors to Bowen and Farmer have added to the collection. The songs are sung in House and School concerts several times a term. Winston Churchill was a great lover of Harrow songs, and when he returned for a concert as prime minister in 1940, it was the first of many annual visits. Churchill Songs is still celebrated in Speech Room each year, and every five years at the Royal Albert Hall.

=== Sport ===
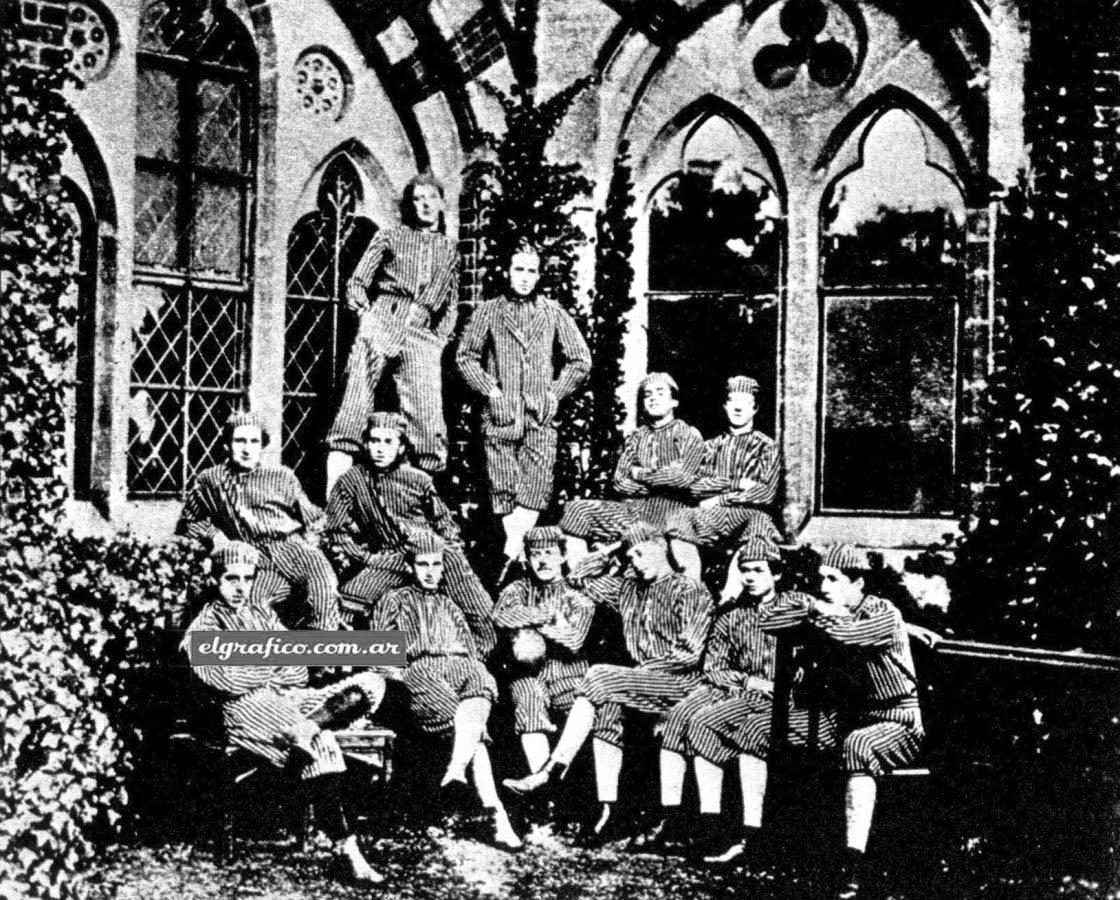
Football team of 1867

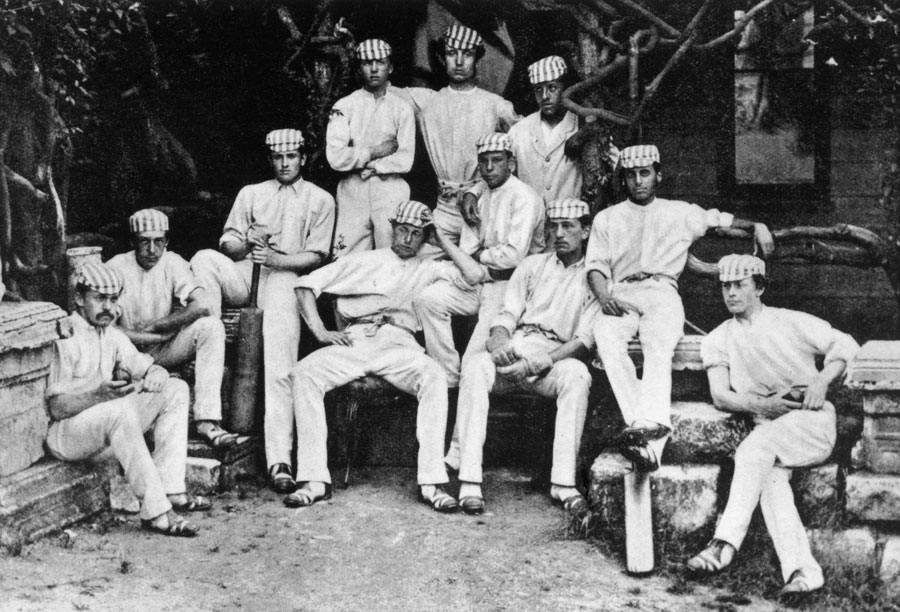
Cricket team of 1868

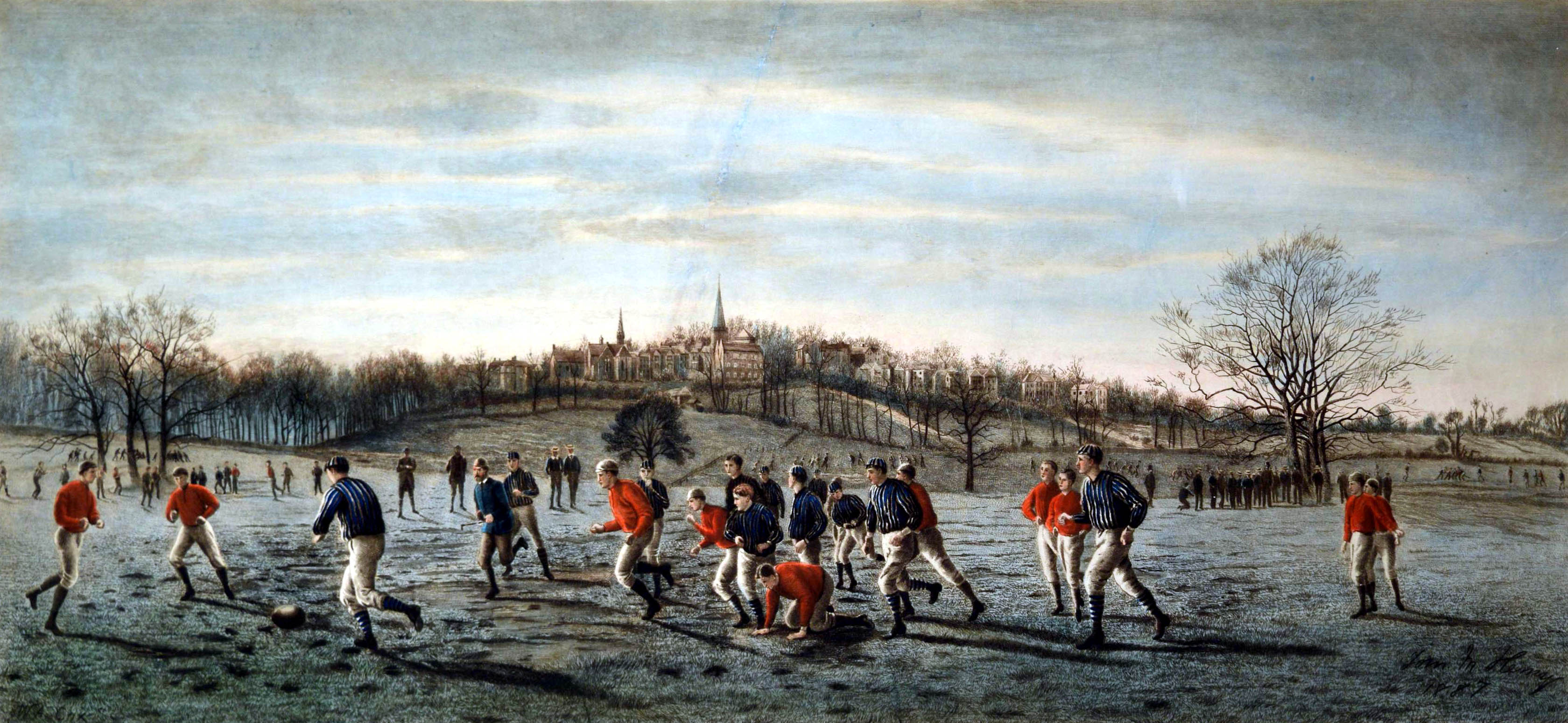
Football match at the School footer field, painted by Thomas M. Henry

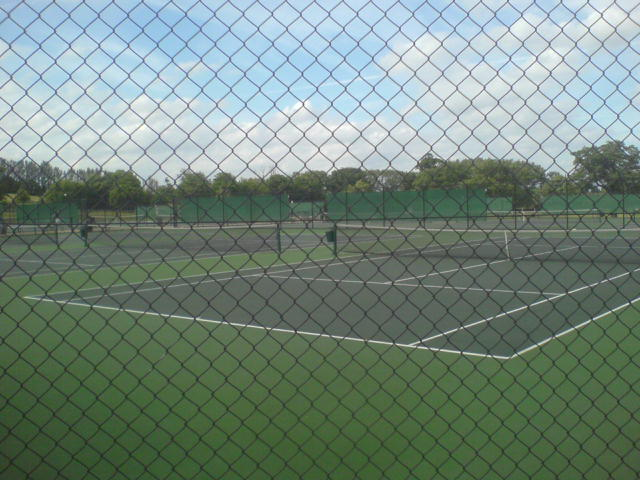
Tennis courts include acrylic, hard and synthetic lawn surfaces.

The sport squash (originally called 'Squasher') was invented in Harrow out of the game rackets around 1830. It spread to other schools, eventually becoming an international sport.

An annual cricket match has taken place between Harrow and Eton College at Lord's Cricket Ground since 1805. It is considered to be the longest-running cricket fixture in the world and is the oldest fixture at Lord's.

Harrow has its own unique style of football called Harrow Football. Currently, the school offers around 30 sports activities for students such as archery, badminton, hockey and judo.

=== Fagging ===
As in most boarding schools, for many years there was a system of 'fagging' whereby younger boys carried out duties for the seniors. At Harrow this was phased out in the 1970s and completely banned by 1990. In his detailed history of the school, Christopher Tyerman recorded that in 1796 fagging was compulsory for boys up to the fourth form, and that 50 out of 139 boys were then fags. In 1928, Harrow Master C. H. P. Mayo said of fagging: "Those who hope to rule must first learn to obey... to learn to obey as a fag is part of the routine that is the essence of the English Public School system... the wonder of other countries".

== Media coverage ==
In 2005, the school was one of fifty of the country's leading independent schools which were found guilty of running an illegal price-fixing cartel, exposed by The Times, which had allowed them to drive up fees for thousands of parents, although the schools said that they had not realised that the change to the law (which had happened only a few months earlier) about the sharing of information had subsequently made it an offence. Each school was required to pay a nominal penalty of £10,000 and all agreed to make ex-gratia payments totalling £3,000,000 into a trust designed to benefit pupils who attended the schools during the period in respect of which fee information was shared.

Harrow was featured in a Sky 1 documentary series entitled Harrow: A Very British School in 2013. In February 2016, the actor Laurence Fox claimed Harrow threatened legal action to prevent him discussing the racism, homophobia and bullying he said he encountered as a pupil at the school.

== Old Harrovians ==
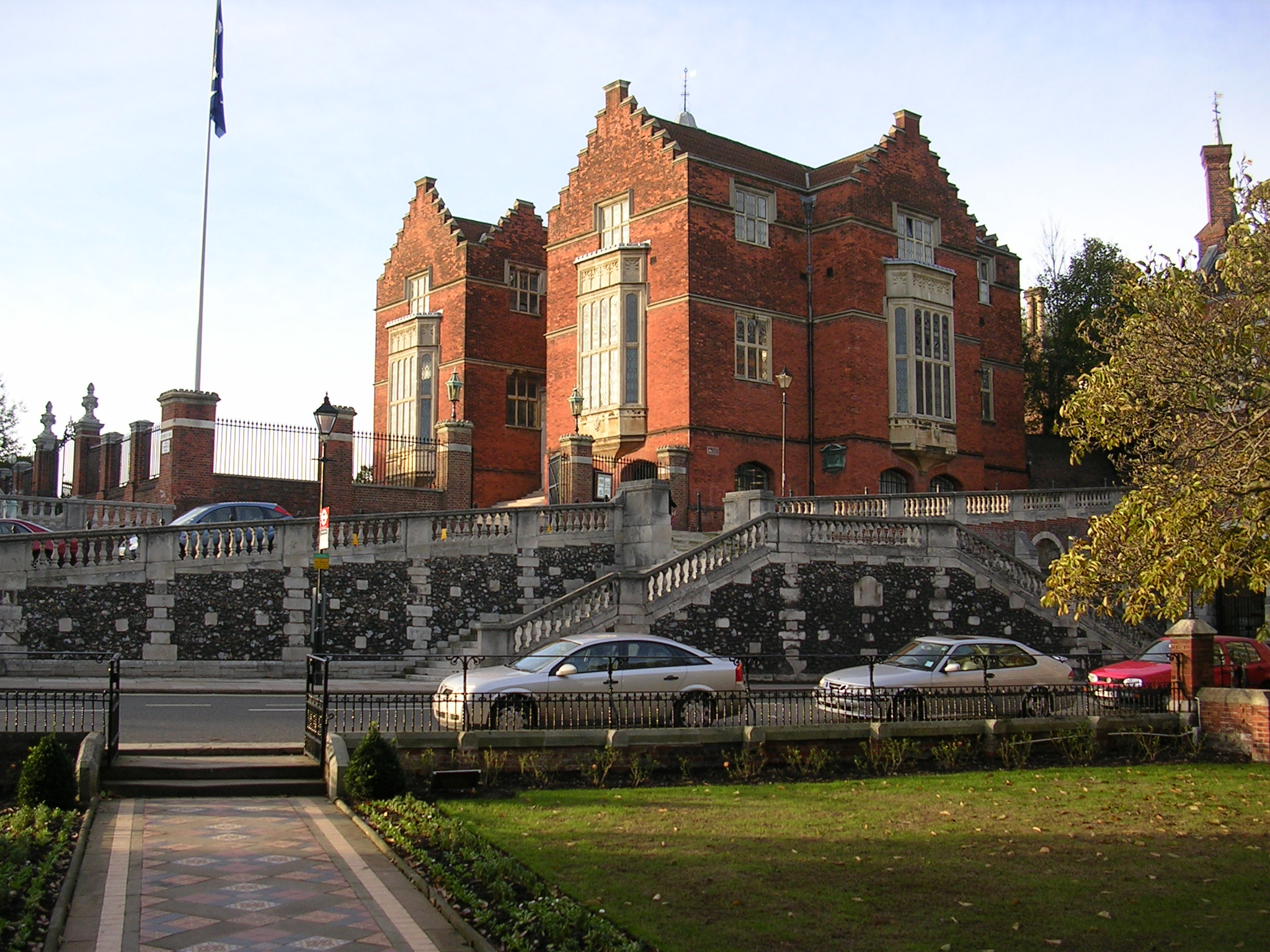
A modern view from the library to the Old Schools, one of the sets of the Harry Potter films

Harrow alumni are known as Old Harrovians, among seven British prime ministers were Winston Churchill, Stanley Baldwin and Robert Peel, and the first Prime Minister of India, Jawaharlal Nehru. Twenty Old Harrovians have been awarded the Victoria Cross and one the George Cross.

Five monarchs have attended the school: King Hussein of Jordan; both Kings of Iraq, Ghazi I and his son Faisal II; the current Emir of Qatar, Sheikh Tamim bin Hamad Al Thani; and Ali bin Hamud of Zanzibar.

Harrow has educated several Nobel laureates: John William Strutt, 3rd Baron Rayleigh, who received the Nobel Prize in Physics in 1904; John Galsworthy, winner of the 1932 Nobel Prize in Literature; and Winston Churchill, who also received the Nobel Prize in Literature in 1953.

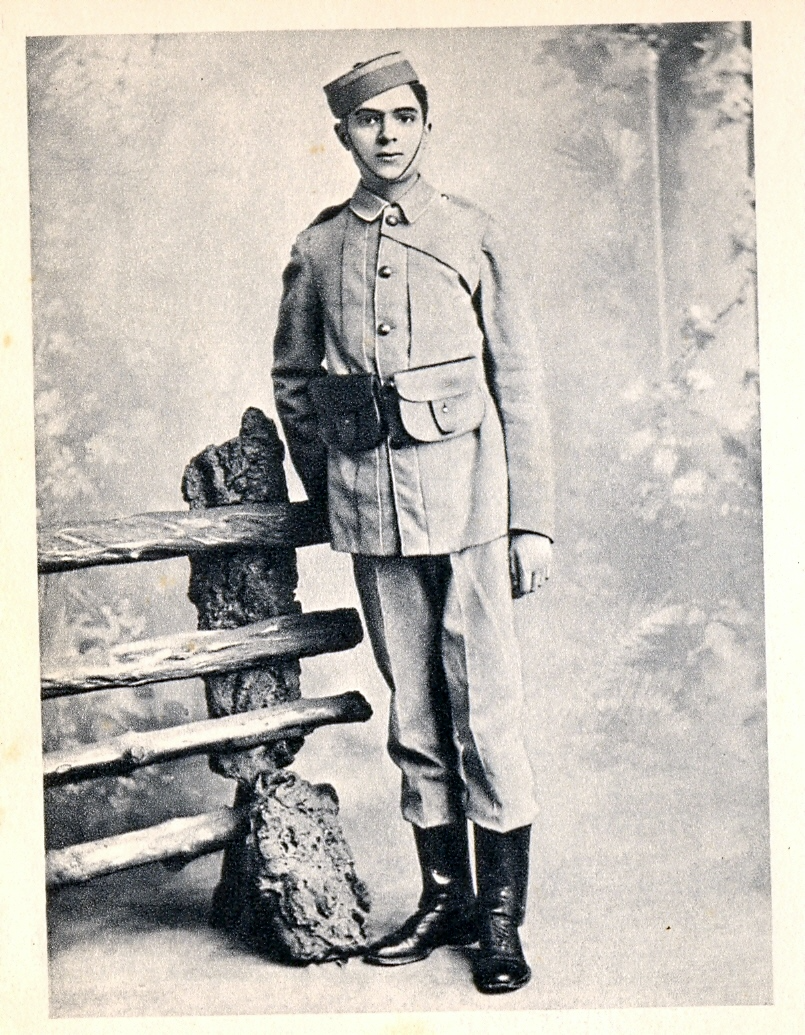
Future Indian prime minister Nehru in Harrow cadet uniform

Other alumni include writers Lord Byron, Anthony Trollope, Sir Terence Rattigan, L. P. Hartley, Simon Sebag-Montefiore, and Richard Curtis, Gerald Grosvenor, 6th Duke of Westminster and prominent reformist Anthony Ashley-Cooper, 7th Earl of Shaftesbury, military commanders such as Harold Alexander, 1st Earl Alexander of Tunis and Sir Peter de la Billiere, and business people (including DeBeers chairman Nicky Oppenheimer, Pret a Manger founder Julian Metcalfe) and the big game hunter and artist General Douglas Hamilton, as well as Island Records founder Chris Blackwell. In sports, the school produced the first two Wimbledon champions (Spencer Gore and Frank Hadow) as well as FA Cup founder C. W. Alcock and current England rugby international players Billy Vunipola, Maro Itoje and Henry Arundell. Alumni in the arts and media industry include actors Edward Fox, Benedict Cumberbatch and Cary Elwes photographer, Youtuber and Comedian, Max Fosh, Nikolai von Bismarck, singers David Dundas and James Blunt, pianist James Rhodes, horse racing pundit John McCririck, and Mark Thatcher, son of Margaret Thatcher.

Fictional characters who have attended Harrow include Brett Sinclair of the TV series The Persuaders!, Withnail and Uncle Monty from the film Withnail & I, Herbert Pocket from Charles Dickens's novel, Great Expectations, and Geoffrey Charles Poldark from Poldark.

== Notable staff ==
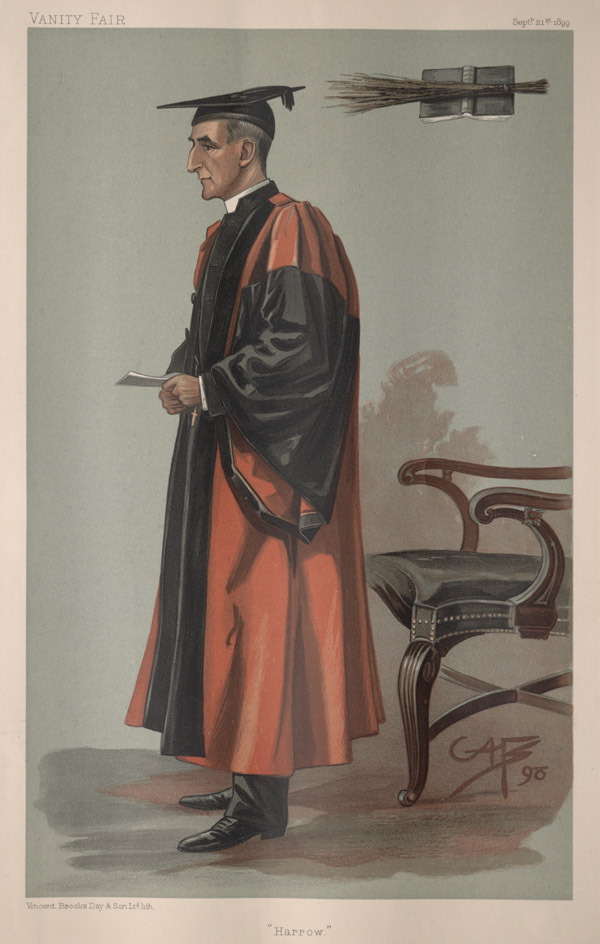
Caricature of Joseph Wood, headmaster at Harrow (1898–1910) by George Algernon Fothergill ("GAF") Caption reads: "Harrow"

- George Masson (1819–1888): noted author of books on French literature and history; teacher and librarian at Harrow
- Robert Baldwin Hayward (1829–1903): mathematical master 1859–1893
- Sir Reginald Thatcher (1888–1957): composer and Principal of the Royal Academy of Music; director of music at the school
- Malcolm Nokes (1897–1986): soldier, airman, Olympic medallist and nuclear scientist; a chemistry master at Harrow from 1946 to 1957, latterly a house master and also Head of Science
- Douglas Miller Reid (1897–1959): noted botanical author; biology teacher at Harrow 1921–1953
- I. M. B. Stuart (1902–1969): writer and broadcaster
- Ronald Watkins (1904–2001): broadcaster and Shakespeare scholar
- Herbert Marchant (1906–1990): Bletchley Park alumnus and diplomat; assistant master 1928–1939
- John Rae (1931–2006): headmaster at Taunton School and Westminster School; Assistant Master at Harrow
- James Morwood (1943–2017): classical scholar; Head of Classics here 1979–1996
- Robert Key (born 1945): politician; taught economics here 1969–1983
- Roger Uttley (born 1949): retired England rugby captain and British Lions Rugby Player (1974 tour); former head of physical education and 1st XV coach
- David Elleray (born 1954): retired Premier League and FIFA-listed referee; former Druries Housemaster and Head of Geography
- Joe Ansbro (born 1985): international rugby player for Scotland; teacher of biology and rugby coach

=== Directors of Music ===
- John Farmer, 1862–1885
- Eaton Faning, 1885–1901
- Percy C. Buck, 1901–1927
- R. S. Thatcher, 1927–1936
- Richard Drakeford, 1976–1985

== Head masters ==
- 1608–1611 Anthony Rate
- 1611–1615 Thomas or Henry Bradley
- 1615–1621 William Launce
- 1621–1628 Robert Whittle
- 1628–1661 William Hide
- 1661–1668 Thomas Johnson
- 1668–1669 Thomas Martin
- 1669–1685 William Horne
- 1685–1691 William Bolton
- 1692–1730 Thomas Brian
- 1730–1746 James Cox (absconded)
- 1746–1760 Thomas Thackeray
- 1760–1771 Robert Carey Sumner
- 1771–1785 Benjamin Heath
- 1785–1805 Joseph Drury
- 1805–1829 George Butler
- 1829–1836 Charles Longley
- 1836–1844 Christopher Wordsworth
- 1845–1859 Charles John Vaughan
- 1860–1885 Henry Montagu Butler
- 1885–1898 James Welldon
- 1898–1910 Joseph Wood
- 1910–1925 Lionel Ford
- 1926–1934 Cyril Norwood
- 1934–1939 Paul Cairn Vellacott
- 1940–1942 Paul Boissier
- 1942–1953 Ralph Westwood Moore
- 1953–1971 Robert Leoline James
- 1971–1981 Michael Hoban
- 1981–1991 Ian David Stafford Beer
- 1991–1999 Nicholas Raymond Bomford
- 1999–2011 Barnaby Lenon
- 2011–2018 James Hawkins
- 2018–2019 Mel Mrowiec (interim)
- 2019–present Alastair Land

== See also ==
- Harrow History Prize
