= Elsie Hall =

Australian-born South African classical pianist

- Elsie Hall and Dutch violinist Herman Salomon (1958)
- Born: 22 June 1877; Toowoomba, Qld
- Died: 27 June 1976 (aged 99); Wynberg, South Africa
- Known for: Singing

Elsie Maude Stanley Hall (22 June 1877 – 27 June 1976), commonly referred to as Elsie Stanley Hall, was an Australian-born South African classical pianist. As a child prodigy performing in Europe she was dubbed "the Antipodean Phenomenon".

== Child prodigy and education ==
Hall was born in Toowoomba, Queensland, Australia, the oldest daughter of William Stanley Hall (c.1845 – 19 June 1927), founding editor of the Fiji Times and later on the literary staff of the Sydney Morning Herald, and his wife Mary Ann, née Sadgrove, a piano teacher. The name "Stanley" was carried in recognition of his mother's family. She was a sister of Rev. Jacob Stanley, president of the British Wesleyan Methodist Conference, and Sarah Chalkey Stanley, who married George Pearce Baldwin.

A child prodigy, Elsie Hall first took up the piano at three years old, studying from the age of five with Professor Josef Kretchmann (1838-1918) in Sydney. In 1883, she attended the Intercolonial Juvenile Industrial Exhibition in Parramatta, New South Wales, and won a prize for her piano performance. In 1888, she was enrolled at the Stuttgart Conservatory in Germany. After a time in Paris, she made her London (Steinway Hall) debut on 5 May 1890 at the age of 12, where she was reviewed by George Bernard Shaw.

She played ... with all the vigour and enjoyment of her age, and as dexterously as you please, being a hardy, wiry girl with great readiness and swiftness of execution, and unbounded alacrity of spirit. At the same time, there is not the slightest artistic excuse for exploiting her cleverness at concerts; I hope we may not hear of her again in public until she is of an age at which she may fairly be asked to earn her living for herself.

The same year she was awarded a pianoforte scholarship at the Royal College of Music, but declined and instead studied at Harrow Music School under John Farmer, and then at the Royal High School for Music in Berlin, where she studied with Ernst Rudorff, met Brahms, Clara Schumann and Joachim, and won the Mendelssohn Prize. Her patron there was Marie Benecke, eldest daughter of Felix Mendelssohn. She went home to Australia for a few years before returning to London in 1903 to resume her concert career.

== Maturity ==
Hall was a close friend of the Lambert family and gave piano lessons to the young Constant Lambert and his older brother Maurice. In 1911 she also taught the 14 year-old Princess Mary at Marlborough House. Hall also played a Beethoven Concerto at the Malvern Festival with Elgar conducting.

She married South African scientist Dr. Frederick Otto Stohr, originally Stöhr (1871–1946), in London on 22 November 1913. He had been conducting ornithological research in Northern Rhodesia (modern Zambia); they settled in South Africa, where he later practised medicine. When her father retired he moved to South Africa to live with his daughter and son-in-law.

Hall spent many years in South Africa but continued to perform internationally. She appeared at the Proms under Henry Wood in 1929, and in 1935 she toured Australia, giving two Bach recitals in Sydney and playing the Schumann Concerto with the Sydney State Orchestra. During the war, although by then in her 60s, she entertained Allied troops in North Africa and Italy. One of her two sons was killed while on active service in the South African Air Force.

She continued to perform professionally on the piano well into her senior years. In 1958 (at age 80), she made a well-received tour of South Africa with Dutch violinist Herman Salomon, who had previously gained his reputation as leader of The Amsterdam String Quartet. In 1967 she recorded a 90th anniversary concert recital. She appeared as a castaway on the BBC Radio programme Desert Island Discs on 28 April 1969. That year she also published her autobiography, The Good Die Young. Hall died, aged 99, at Wynberg, South Africa, and was buried at Hout Bay Cemetery.
