= Reginald Thatcher =

English musician and composer

Reginald Thatcher by Rodrigo Moynihan, 1955

Sir Reginald Sparshatt Thatcher (11 March 1888 – 6 May 1957) was an English musician, composer, teacher and musical administrator. He was assistant music-master at Clifton College, 1911; director of music, Royal Naval College, Osborne, 1914; director of music at Charterhouse School, 1919 and Harrow School, 1928–36. He was appointed as Sir Adrian Boult's deputy in the BBC music department in 1937, and was principal of the Royal Academy of Music (RAM), London, from 1949 to 1955.

== Life and career ==
Thatcher was born at Midsomer Norton, Somerset, the son of a brewer at Welton, Midsomer Norton, and one of fifteen children. He was educated privately, and then won an open organ scholarship to the Royal College of Music, London. From there he progressed to Worcester College, Oxford, as organ scholar in 1907. He graduated in 1910, and then took a doctorate in music.

After leaving Oxford Thatcher's first post was assistant music master at Clifton College, from 1911. Thatcher was appointed director of music at the Royal Naval College, Osborne in 1914, but during the First World War he joined the army, and was awarded the Military Cross and the OBE. In 1915 he married Ruth Trethowan; they had one daughter and one son. The latter was killed in action in 1942. After the war Thatcher served successively as director of music at Charterhouse School (1919–28) and Harrow School (1928–36).

In 1937 Sir Adrian Boult, who combined the roles of director of music at the BBC and chief conductor of the BBC Symphony Orchestra, was in need of a deputy to take over day-to-day administrative work, leaving him freer to concentrate on the orchestra. Thatcher, an old friend from their university days, became Boult's deputy director. Thatcher's nature was unassertive and sensitive, and although, with Boult's support, he was several times offered the post of director, he always refused. During the Second World War, when the BBC had to be evacuated from London, Thatcher organised three successive moves for the music department, first to Evesham, then Bristol and finally to Bedford. As The Times put it, "he left for the quieter life of the RAM in 1943".

At the RAM Thatcher first held the post of warden; he was promoted to vice-principal in 1945, and on the death of the principal, Sir Stanley Marchant, in 1949, Thatcher was appointed as his successor. The Times obituarist said of his tenure:

He took an active part in London's musical life; a wise committee man he served the Musicians Benevolent Fund, the Royal Musical Association as treasurer, the Royal Philharmonic Society, the Royal College of Organists, of which he was president from 1954 to 1956, and the Incorporated Society of Musicians.

The obituarist added that Thatcher's term of office at the academy was "marked by the urbanity towards staff, students, and strangers that he had inherited from Merchant".

Thatcher was the composer of the anthem, Come ye faithful. Portraits of him by Walter Stoneman and Elliott & Fry hang in the National Portrait Gallery, London. His portrait was also painted by Rodrigo Moynihan.

Thatcher was knighted in 1952. Ill health led him to retire in from the RAM 1955, and he died at his home in Cranleigh, Surrey, two years later, at the age of 69. His widow survived him, and died in 1981.

== Sources ==
- Boult, Adrian (1973). My Own Trumpet. London: Hamish Hamilton. ISBN 978-0-241-02445-4.
