= Ralph Westwood Moore =

English classicist, author and headmaster (1906–53)

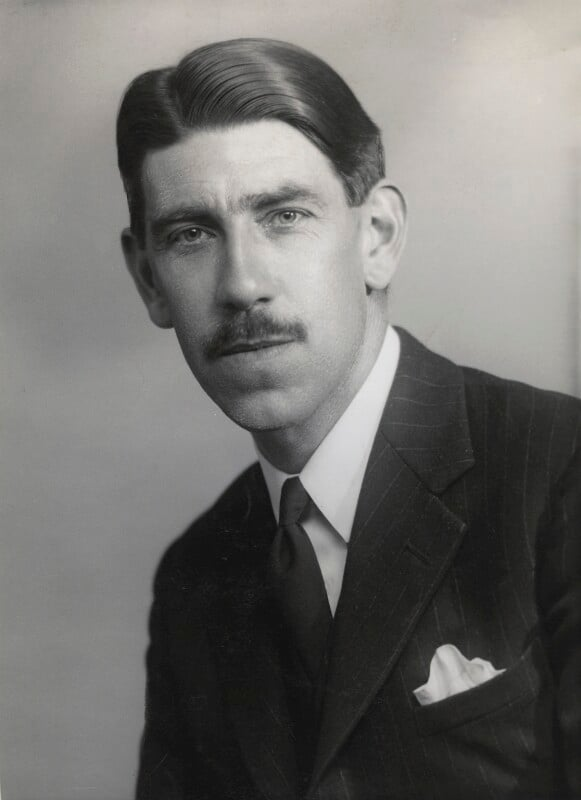
Moore in 1942

Ralph Westwood Moore (1906 – 10 January 1953) was an English classicist and writer who became the headmaster of Harrow School in 1942.

== Life ==
Ralph Moore was born in Wolverhampton in the late summer of 1906, the elder son of George Moore. George Moore is described as an artist and designer of wrought iron gates and fences. His mother, born Emily Skidmore, also came from an English middle-class family.

He attended Wolverhampton Grammar School and then, as a scholar, Christ Church, Oxford where he achieved academic distinction. After this he became a teacher, employed as an assistant master at a succession of "public schools" in England. Still aged only 32, he accepted the headmastership of Bristol Grammar School in 1938. Four years later, in 1942, he became headmaster of Harrow School on the northwestern fringes of London.

== Bibliography ==
Books written or edited by R. M. Moore included:

- Versus Wulfrunenses, Wolverhampton: 1929.
- Prose at Present: A Selection of Extracts from Modern Writers, London: George Bell & Sons, 1933.
- The Threshold: An Anthology of Verse and Prose Contributed from the Public and Secondary Schools of England: 1935, London: Selwyn & Bloint, 1935.
- The Romans in Britain: A Selection of Latin Texts, Edited with a Commentary, London: Methuen, c. 1938.
- Vergil's Aeneid: Book III, London: George Bell & Sons, 1938 (The Alpha Classics).
- Education: To-day and To-morrow, London: Michael Joseph, 1945.

== Personal ==
Ralph Moore married Elsie Barbara Tonks (1901–1969) at Wolverhampton in the early summer of 1931. The marriage resulted in the births of two recorded sons in 1933 and 1935.

Early in 1952, keen to set a good example to the children in his care, he submitted himself to a chest x-ray. Chest x-rays for adolescents were encouraged at that time in order to provide for early diagnosis of tuberculosis. A newspaper reported that all the pupils were "free from chest troubles". Dr. Moore was not, however. He underwent several operations during 1952 but "refused to leave his post". He died at Harrow from lung cancer on 10 January 1953.

Academic offices
Preceded by Paul Boissier; 1940 – 1942	Headmaster of Harrow School; 1942–1953	Succeeded by Robert Leoline James; 1953 – 1971
