= Music at Balliol College, Oxford =

The musical tradition at Balliol College, Oxford was established in the period 1870 to 1893 when Benjamin Jowett was Master there, with an organ introduced in the college chapel in 1874. On the arrival of John Farmer as organist in 1885, a series of classical concerts on Sunday evenings began, taking place in the college hall, which became a fixture. Balliol College did not offer music as an undergraduate subject, and the University of Oxford did not establish a Music Department until 1950. Ernest Walker, Balliol's Director of Music 1901–1925, over his time in Oxford "had immense influence on a whole generation of musicians."

Susan L. F. Wollenberg wrote "From their inception in 1885 the Balliol concerts showed special features". Edward Heath wrote in 1986:

The Balliol Concerts not only play a major part in the life of the College, they are also a unique aspect in the musical activities of the whole university [...] It is by this means that so many generations of Oxford men and women have come to know and love the greatest chamber music in the world played by the leading artists of the day.

The 1,950th Balliol concert was given on 7 November 2024 by Raphael Wallfisch and Simon Callaghan (piano). The programme included cello works of Walker, along with works by Schubert, Schumann, and Beethoven.

== Sunday evening concerts ==
The Sunday evening music concerts are organised by the Balliol College Musical Society to bring chamber music to a wider audience. Notable musicians who have performed include:

Musician	Instrument	Born
Fanny Davies	pianist	1861
Nikolai Medtner	pianist	1879
Arthur Rubinstein	pianist	1887
Solomon	pianist	1902
Claudio Arrau	pianist	1903
Vlado Perlemuter	pianist	1904
Yehudi Menuhin	violinist	1916
Hephzibah Menuhin	pianist	1920
Busch Quartet	quartet	1919
Dame Felicity Lott	soprano	1947
Pascal Rogé	pianist	1951
András Schiff	pianist	1953
Raphael Wallfisch	cellist	1953
Anne Schwanewilms	soprano	1967
Vienna Piano Trio	trio	1988

The programmes from the mid-1950s attended by Michael Scaife show the musical diversity of the performances.

Röntgen String Quartet	25 Oct 1953
John Kennedy (cello) and Scylla Kennedy (piano)	8 Nov 1953
Robert Masters String Quartet	22 Nov 1953
various performers	27 Nov 1953
London Harpsichord Ensemble	7 Feb 1954
Balliol College Choir conducted by W. Llewellyn	21 Feb 1954
Flora Nielson soprano and Thomas Armstrong piano	7 Mar 1954
Eileen McLoughlin (soprano) and Julian Bream (guitar and lute)	2 May 1954
Element String Quartet	30 May 1954
Ralph Kirkpatrick (harpsichord)	24 Oct 1954
Jelly d’Aranyi (violin) and Ivor Keys (piano)	31 Oct 1954
group of string players led by Ernest Element	28 Nov 1954
Alan Loveday and Neville Marriner (violins) and George Malcolm (piano)	22 Jan 1955
Alfred Loewenguth, Maurice Fueri, Roger Roche, and Pierre Basseux	6 Feb 1955
various performers	20 Feb 1955
Elizabeth Vernon Powell (solo piano), David Galliver (tenor) and Thomas Armstrong (accompanist)	6 Mar 1955
Adila Fachiri (violin), David Gwylt (cello) and John Gwylt (piano)	1 May 1955
David Martin (violin)	29 May 1955
Rubbra-Gruenberg-Pleeth Trio	16 Oct 1955
Valerie Tryon (piano)	30 Oct 1955
Alfred Deller (countertenor), Desmond Dupré (lute and bass viol) and Thurston Dart (harpsichord)	4 Mar 1956
Golden Age Singers, directed by Margaret Field-Hyde	29 Apr 1956

The Society was established in 1885 by John Farmer, formerly the music master of Harrow School, who was invited by the then Master, Benjamin Jowett, to become Director of Music. These concerts were the first secular Sunday concerts in England. Attendees included not only students but also guests including Robert Browning, Lord Coleridge and T. H. Huxley. The 1,000th concert of the Society was given in 1937. The series continued without interruption through World War II.

The atmosphere at the concerts was described by Edward Heath:

These concerts had one tradition that no other college maintained. At the end of the concert, when the applause for the final item was dying, the Master sitting in the front row, waved his programme aloft. The whole audience rose, faced the organ at the back of the Hall and sang the Chorale printed on the programme sheet. It gave the concerts a tremendous finale.

== Ernest Walker, Director of Music 1901–1925 ==
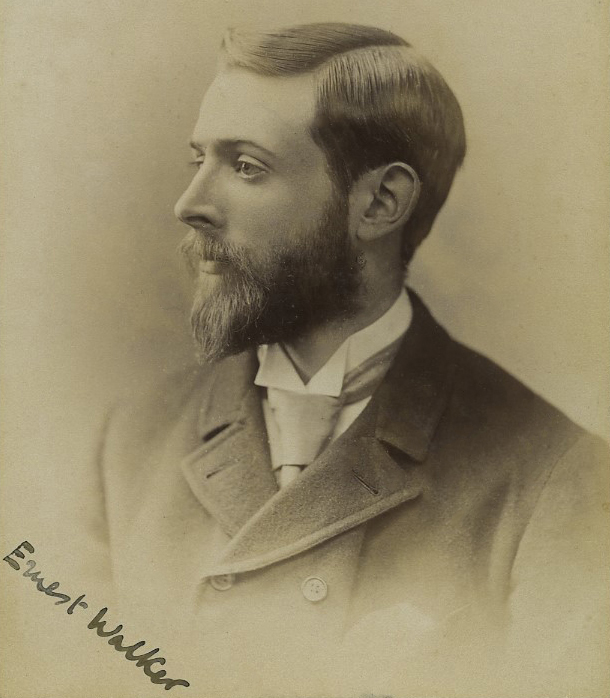
Ernest Walker, photograph c.1903

L. E. Jones, who entered Balliol as an undergraduate in 1904, wrote in his autobiography of the "moving spirit" in the Balliol concerts:

Thin, bent, etiolated, with a despondent black beard and a falsetto voice, Dr. Walker looked anything but the 'live wire' that he, in fact, was.

Of the period when Walker was Balliol's Director of Music, it has been said "Many of the most important figures in the English musical world played at Balliol at this time". They included:

- Harry Plunket Greene, who sang in 1901, accompanied by Walker.
- Adolf Busch, who in 1912 played the Brahms G major violin sonata and other pieces at a Balliol concert, accompanied by Walker.
- Fanny Davies
- Steuart Wilson

Margaret Deneke of Lady Margaret Hall came under the influence of Walker and Donald Tovey. She and her sister Helena held concerts at their home Gunfield, where Busch and Marie Soldat-Roeger played. Variations on a Theme of Joachim (Op. 40, published 1927) by Walker was given its premiere at Balliol by Jelly d'Arányi.

Walker's successor as Balliol's Director of Music was William Henry Harris. While running the concert series from 1925 to 1933, he was organist for other Oxford colleges.

== Musicians associated with Balliol College ==
Image	Name	Join Date	Field of work	Comments	Refs
	Cristoph Denoth	2006	guitarist	artist in residence 2006-9 Professor, RCM	
	Miron Fyodorov	2004	hip hop	Russian artist Oxxxymiron	
	Oliver Weindling	1974	jazz	Original member, Oxcentrics jazz band. Founded jazz Babel Label and the Vortex Jazz Club in East London	
	Christopher Page	1971	musicologist	medieval music	
	Nicholas Kenyon	1969	BBC Radio 3	Organiser BBC Proms	
	Vernon Handley	1951	conductor	supported British composers	
	Edward Heath	1935	organist, conductor	Prime Minister	
	George Malcolm	1934	harpsichordist	Master of Music, Westminster Cathedral	
	Richard Buckle	1934	Ballet	Founded Ballet magazine	
	Sydney Carter	1933	songwriter	"Lord of the Dance"	
	Inglis Gundry	1923	composer	lecturer on musical appreciation	
	Victor Hely-Hutchinson	1920	composer, conductor, pianist	switched to RCM after one year "Carol Symphony"	
	F. S. Kelly	1900	composer	Olympic gold medallist in rowing	
	Donald Tovey	1895	composer	Essays in Musical Analysis	
	Ernest Walker	1887	composer	Honorary Fellow	
	John Farmer	1885	Director of Music	organist, composer and keyboardist	
	Sir Harold Boulton	1878	songwriter	"Skye Boat Song"	
	Julian Sturgis	1868	librettist	"the best serious librettist of the day" (W.S.Gilbert) FA Cup Final winner	

== Organs and organ scholars ==
Jowett gave an organ by Henry Willis & Sons for the college hall, in 1885. In 1938 Harrison & Harrison built a new organ for the college chapel, replacing the original organ.

The college funds an organ scholar. One was the former Prime Minister Edward Heath. Organ scholars noted in other fields include Christopher Longuet-Higgins from 1942, and Ronald Gordon from 1945.
