= Mary Louisa White =

Mary Louisa White (2 September 1866 – January 1935) was a British composer, pianist, and educator who invented a Letterless Method of musical notation. Her parents were Robert and Louisa Makin White. Mary Louisa, known to her family as "Louie," was the oldest of their four children. She also had a half brother and a half sister from her father's first marriage.

White studied music with John Farmer in London, and gave frequent concerts in London and Paris, including at the Steinway Hall in London. She taught piano at Kensington High School at the turn of the 20th century, and worked at the Girls' Day School Trust with her sisters Jessie and Winnie from 1902 to 1903. At the time, Kensington High School was administered by the Girls' Day School Trust.

White invented the "Letterless Method" of teaching music to beginners. The Letterless Method used metal clefs, rings, disks, and black and white buttons for notes, which children could manipulate for tactile learning.

White's papers, including scrapbooks about her musical career created by her mother and sisters, are archived at University College, London. Her compositions were published by Joseph Williams and Alfred Novello, both of London.

White's compositions include:

== Operetta ==
- Babes in the Woods, opus 42
- Beauty and the Beast, opus 41

== Orchestra ==
- Transvaal War Symphony

== Piano ==
- Ballade in G flat
- Dances No 1 and 2, Opus 47
- Impromptu in E flat, Opus 54 No 2
- Minuet in A flat
- Nocturne in D flat
- Novelette in c minor, Opus 36 No 2
- Prelude in D flat
- Rhapsody in b flat minor
- Short Lyrics
- Sketch Book (Gavotte, Hunting Song, March, Minuet, Pastorale, Waltz)
- Spinning Wheel
- Tiny Tunes for Young Musicians
- Two Waltzes
- Without Octaves

== Vocal ==
- Hush-a-bye
- Jubilate (trio for treble voices)
- Maypole
- Night's Rhapsody (duet)
- Prelude of Spring
- School Song for Girls
- Secret of the Sea
- Sleep, Little Baby, Sleep
- Sleep, Sweetly Sleep
- Song of the Water Sprite
- There be None of Beauty's Daughters
- To the River
- Twelve Easy Duets
- When First I Sang to my Darling
