= Forty Years On (play) =

1968 play by Alan Bennett

- Allan Warren and John Gielgud in Forty Years On
- Original language: English
- Written by: Alan Bennett
- Genre: Drama
- Setting: Public school

Premiere
- Date: 1968
- Place: Apollo Theatre

Forty Years On is a 1968 play by Alan Bennett. It was his first West End play. It takes its name from the Harrow School song. The play is set in a British public school called Albion House ("Albion" is an ancient word for Britain), which is putting on an end of term play in front of the parents, i.e. the audience. A play within the play is a review of the first half of the 20th Century, made up of a series of vignettes. The scenes are linked by a conversation involving a Member of Parliament and his family that takes place during World War II, reflecting on what has passed.

The first vignette is a parody of Oscar Wilde. This is followed by an evocation of the Edwardian era, seen through people's too-rosy memories, including growing up and going to school at the time. There follows a spoof lantern-slide lecture on Lawrence of Arabia, "the man and the myth".

Bertrand Russell appears, as do Lady Ottoline Morrell and Osbert Sitwell. A memoir follows about a group of young aristocrats and intellectuals known at the time as The Coterie. This gives an ominous foreshadowing of the slaughter of World War I.

Leonard and Virginia Woolf appear in a spoof about the Bloomsbury Group which confuses Isaiah Berlin with Irving Berlin. A school confirmation class turns into awkward sex education. There is a parody of the adventure novels of John Buchan, "Sapper" and their kind, described as "the school of Snobbery with Violence". We see a mock trial of Neville Chamberlain over Munich. His sentence: "perpetual ignominy."

The play concludes with a moment of nostalgia for what was lost. "A sergeant's world it is now, the world of the lay-by and the civic improvement scheme." The school sing the closing hymn "All people that on earth do dwell."

== Productions ==
The first production of Forty Years On opened at the Apollo Theatre in Shaftesbury Avenue on 31 October 1968, directed by Patrick Garland and was an immediate success. The school's headmaster was played by John Gielgud; Paul Eddington was Franklin and Alan Bennett played Tempest. It ran until 24 November 1969. The full cast was:

- Bottomley – Stephen Leigh
- Cartwright – Andrew Branch
- Charteris – Freddie Foot
- Crabtree – Colin Reese
- Dishforth – Peter Kinley
- Foster – William Burleigh
- Franklin – Paul Eddington (portrayed by David Horovitch in the 1984 revival and Robert Bathurst in the audio drama)
- Gillings – Dickie Harris
- Headmaster – John Gielgud (portrayed by Emlyn Williams in the last 3 months of the original run, Paul Eddington in the 1984 revival and Alan Bennett in the audio drama)
- Jarvis – Stephen Price
- Leadbetter – Paul Guess
- Lord – Robert Langley
- Macilwaine – Keith McNally
- Matron – Dorothy Reynolds (portrayed by Phyllida Law in the 1984 revival and Eleanor Bron in the audio drama)
- Miss Nisbitt – Nora Nicholson
- Moss – Mark Hughes
- Organist – Carl Davis
- Rumbold – Merlin Ward
- Salter – Denis McGrath
- Skinner – Anthony Andrews
- Spooner – Roger Brain
- Tempest – Alan Bennett (portrayed by Stephen Fry in the 1984 revival)
- The Lectern Reader – Robert Swann
- Tredgold – George Fenton
- Tupper – Allan Warren
- Wigglesworth – Thomas Cockrell
- Wimpenny – Philip Chappell

A revival of the play was staged by Chichester Festival Theatre, with Richard Wilson playing the Headmaster, in April 2017.

== Critical reaction ==
Philip Hope-Wallace in The Guardian described the play as "A wry, irreverent and often wildly hilarious kind of Cavalcade in reverse. I found myself laughing helplessly, more often than at any time this year."

Irving Wardle in The New York Times: "We have been waiting for a full-scale mock-heroic pageant of modern myth, and Mr. Bennett has now supplied it... On his own lips the writing sometimes congeals into compulsive punning and wonderland nonsense logic. Not so on Gielgud's clutching a coronation mug as his world goes down and turning the schoolmasterly sarcasms into pure gold."

Sue Gaisford "Nearly 40 years on and Bennett is having another attack of nostalgia", The Sunday Times, 6 August 2000

In a 1999 study of Bennett's work, Peter Wolfe describes the play as "nostalgic and astringent, elegiac and unsettling".
