= Moux =

Commune in Occitanie, France

- Commune
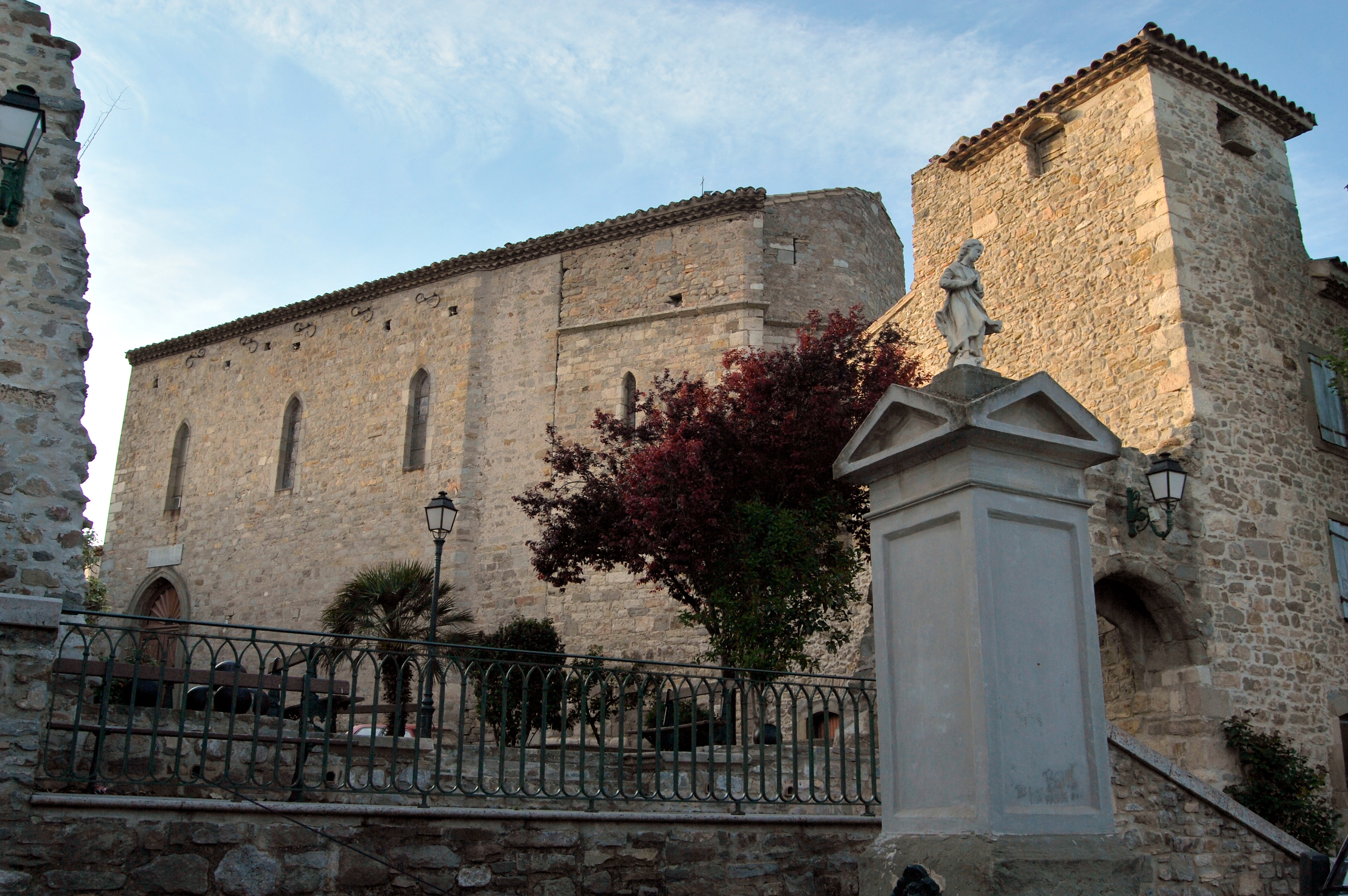
- The church in Moux

- Coat of arms
- Location of Moux
- Location within France Location within Occitanie
- Coordinates: 43°10′53″N 2°39′08″E
- Country: France
- Region: Occitania
- Department: Aude
- Arrondissement: Narbonne
- Canton: La Montagne d'Alaric

Government
  - Mayor (2020–2026): Gerard Pioch
- Area^{1}: 15.70 km^{2} (6.06 sq mi)
- Elevation: 94 m (308 ft)
- Highest elevation: 601 m (1,972 ft)
- Lowest elevation: 54 m (177 ft)
- Population (2023): 719
  - Density: 45.8/km^{2} (119/sq mi)
- Time zone: UTC+01:00 (CET)
  - Summer (DST): UTC+02:00 (CEST)
- INSEE/Postal code: 11261 /11700
- ^{1} French Land Register data, which excludes lakes, ponds, glaciers > 1 km^{2} (0.386 sq mi or 247 acres) and river estuaries.

Moux (French pronunciation: [muks]; Occitan: Mos) is a commune in the Aude department in southern France.

== Population ==
Historical population
Year	Pop.	±% p.a.
1968	661	—
1975	611	−1.12%
1982	563	−1.16%
1990	519	−1.01%
1999	507	−0.26%
2007	563	+1.32%
2012	674	+3.66%
2017	701	+0.79%
2023	719	+0.42%
Source: INSEE

== See also ==
- Corbières AOC
- Communes of the Aude department
