= Edward Ernest Bowen =

English schoolmaster, songwriter and cricketer

Personal information
- Full name: Edward Ernest Bowen
- Born: 30 March 1836; Glenmore, Ireland
- Died: 8 April 1901 (aged 65); Moux, Côte-d'Or, France
- Batting: Right-handed
- Role: Wicket-keeper
- Relatives: Charles Bowen (brother)

Domestic team information
- Years: Team
- 1864: Hampshire

Career statistics
Competition	First-class
Matches	1
Runs scored	0
Batting average	0.00
100s/50s	–/–
Top score	0
Catches/stumpings	–/–
- Source: Cricinfo, 21 August 2009

Edward Ernest Bowen (30 March 1836 – 8 April 1901) was a first-class cricketer, footballer, and an influential schoolmaster at Harrow School from 1859 until his death, and the author of the Harrow school song, "Forty Years On". He was notable in football for winning the first two FA Cup finals with the Wanderers.

== Biography ==
The son of Christopher Bowen, he was born at Glenmore in Ireland; his elder brother was Charles Bowen, a well-known judge. He was educated in England at Blackheath Proprietary School and King's College, London before entering Trinity College, Cambridge. While studying at Cambridge, Bowen served as president of the Cambridge Union in 1856. After graduating from Cambridge, he was appointed an assistant master at Marlborough College in 1858, and moved to Harrow School in 1859. He was appointed a fellow of Trinity College in the same year as his move to Harrow. As a schoolmaster, Bowen believed that boys must be interested in his lessons and at ease with him. This was in contrast with the grave formality typical of the Victorian era. He was the founder of the "modern side" at Harrow, which gave prominence to subjects other than Latin and Greek. Bowen was the author of the Harrow school song, "Forty Years On", which is still sung today, and to which an extra verse was later added in honour of Winston Churchill. He also wrote many other Harrow School songs along with the then Master in Charge of Music, many of which are sung by the school to this day at occasions known as songs every term. While at Harrow, he was housemaster of The Grove boarding house.

Bowen was considered a pioneer of association football at Harrow, and was an accomplished footballer himself. He played with the Wanderers in the inaugural FA Cup, helping the side reach the final of the competition against the Royal Engineers at The Oval, which the Wanderers won 1–0; they repeated their success in the 1872–73 FA Cup, defeating Oxford University in the final 2–0. Bowen played for England in the first pseudo-international in 1870, against Scotland at The Oval; this match preceded the first official international in 1872. Bowen played cricket at first-class level for Hampshire against Sussex at Hove. He failed to score in the match, twice being dismissed by James Lillywhite. His other sporting endeavours expanded to cycling, mountaineering, skating, and walking. Whilst an undergraduate at Cambridge, he walked the 90 miles from Cambridge to Oxford in 26 hours. He was politically active and was a member of the Liberal Party. He was their candidate for Hertford in the 1880 General election, but lost to future Prime Minister Arthur Balfour.

It was whilst on a cycling tour of France in 1901 that Bowen died suddenly at the village of Moux. Despite seemingly having been in perfect health, it was noted that his sudden death occurred while he was trying to mount his bicycle. Cyril Norwood said of him that he had "kept the eternal boy alive within his own breast to the very end". His elder brother was also a first-class cricketer. His grandson, I. M. B. Stuart, was an Irish rugby union international and broadcaster.
