= Forty Years On (song) =

1872 song written by Edward Ernest Bowen and John Farmer

"Forty Years On" is a song written by Edward Ernest Bowen and John Farmer in 1872. It was originally written for Harrow School, but has also been adopted by many other schools in several countries.

It is the primary school song of Harrow School, and is sung at the end of "Songs" events, when school alumni return to hear performances of the school songs by current pupils. The "Churchill" verse, written to commemorate Old Harrovian Winston Churchill, is only sung once a year at a special Churchill Songs. Traditionally, verse three is sung by Old Harrovians at School Songs events. The penultimate Follow Up! in each chorus is sung unaccompanied by the School XII, composed of the best singers in the top year.

The lyrics "With the tramp of the twenty-two men" refer to the 22 players on the field during a game of Harrow football, a precursor to association football played exclusively at Harrow School. This part is sometimes altered at other schools for other sports which are more significant to the school in question. This song is also played at other Harrow schools across the world.

The song inspired and appears in Forty Years On, a play by Alan Bennett. The song was also used in the films Young Winston (1972) and Never Let Me Go (2010).
