= Pitmedden Garden =

17th-century walled garden in Aberdeenshire, Scotland

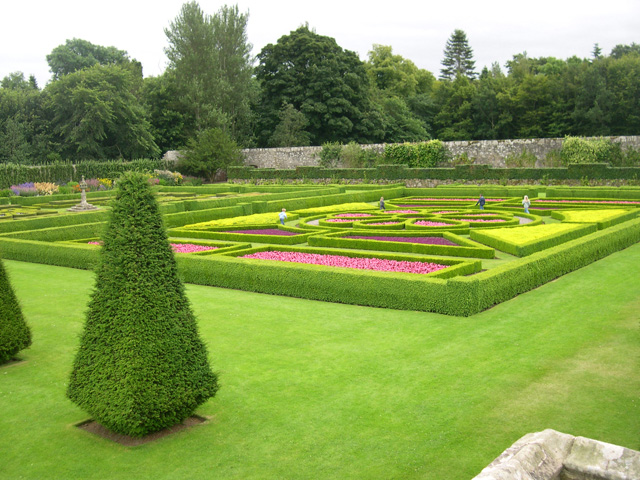
- Interactive map of Pitmedden Garden
- Type: Formal walled garden
- Location: Near Pitmedden, Aberdeenshire, Scotland
- Coordinates: 57.3427°N 2.1923°W

Inventory of Gardens and Designed Landscapes in Scotland
- Official name: Pitmedden
- Designated: 1 July 1987
- Reference no.: GDL00314
- Created: c. 1675
- Operated by: National Trust for Scotland
- Status: Open to the public

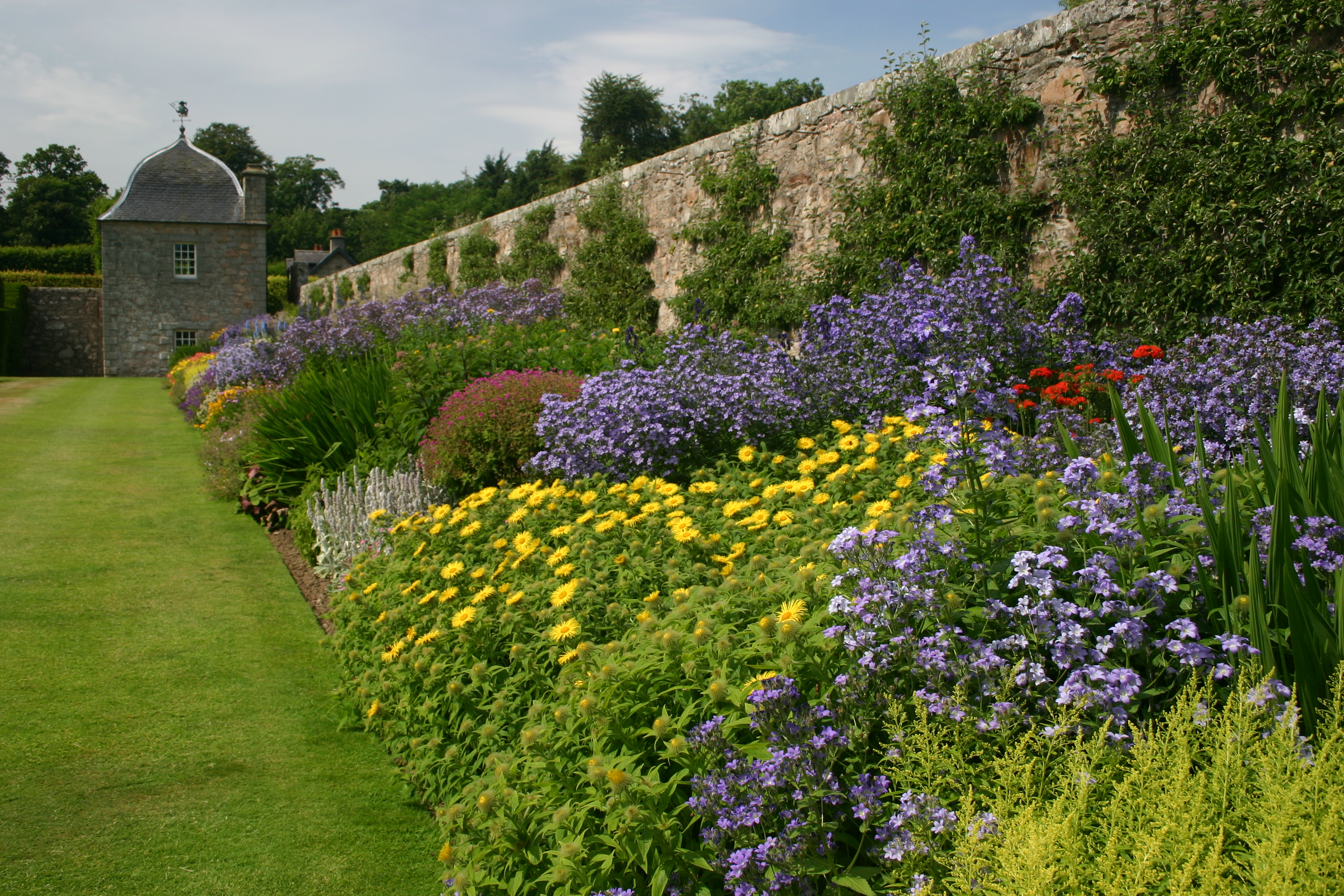
A long perennial border at Pitmedden

Pitmedden Garden is a garden near the village of Pitmedden, Aberdeenshire, Scotland. It is owned by the National Trust for Scotland. The garden dates from around 1675 and contains formal parterres, herbaceous borders, and an orchard. It is open to the public.

== History ==
The earliest recording of a house on the property was in the early 15th century by the Panton family. By 1603, there was now a garden and estate including a tower, fortalice, orchards, dovecote, and water meadows.

The Seton family owned the site from 1603 to 1893. Sir Alexander Seton and Dame Margaret Lauder, his wife, took possession in 1658, established a house and garden at the site in 1675. The original house, together with the garden plans, was largely destroyed by fire in 1807.

By 1858 the estate size had changed with the introduction of turnpike roads. Whilst owned by the Setons, it appears the estate was more managed by tenants.

The house was later occupied in the 1800s by shipping owner and politician George Thompson.

About 1893 or 1894, the house and garden went to Major James Keith. In 1952, the year before his death, Keith gifted the garden to the National Trust for Scotland. Much of the estate lands were sold to provide ongoing maintenance capital.

== Design ==
The garden is noted for its geometric parterres, which vary in shape from a thistle to Sir Alexander Seton's coat of arms. Pitmedden also has several long, varied borders which run along the garden walls.

The 20th century restoration based three of the parterre sections on the 1647 plan of Holyrood Palace by Gordon of Rothiemay, and the fourth section represents a memorial to Alexander Seton and his father John Seton.

When handed over in 1952, the grounds included a 9 feet (2.7 m) 1675 sundial.

Along with more than 200 fruit trees and 6 miles (9.7 km) of hedges, there is a Museum of Farming Life.

== See also ==
- Clan Forbes
