= Seton baronets of Pitmedden (1683) =

The Seton baronetcy, of Pitmedden in the County of Aberdeen, was created in the Baronetage of Nova Scotia on 15 January 1683 for Alexander Seton, a Shire Commissioner for Aberdeenshire, and a Lord of the Justiciary under the judicial title of Lord Pitmedden.

The 2nd Baronet was one of the Commissioners for the Treaty of Union between England and Scotland and sat as Member of Parliament for the combined Scottish constituencies at the first Parliament of Great Britain.

The presumed 12th Baronet did not successfully prove his succession and was consequently not on the Official Roll of the Baronetage; and the same was the case for the presumed 13th Baronet. As of 2026 the title is marked dormant on the Official Roll.

== Seton baronets, of Pitmedden (1683) ==
- Sir Alexander Seton, 1st Baronet (died 1719)
- Sir William Seton, 2nd Baronet (1673–1744)
- Sir Alexander Seton, 3rd Baronet (1703–1750)
- Sir William Seton, 4th Baronet (died 1774)
- Sir Archibald Seton, 5th Baronet (died 1775)
- Sir William Seton, 6th Baronet (died 1818)
- Sir William Coote Seton, 7th Baronet (1808–1880)
- Sir James Lumsden Seton, 8th Baronet (1835–1884)
- Sir William Samuel Seton, 9th Baronet (1837–1914)
- Sir John Hastings Seton, 10th Baronet (1888–1956)
- Sir Robert James Seton, 11th Baronet (1926–1993)
- Sir James Christall Seton, 12th Baronet (1913–1998)
- Charles Wallace Seton, presumed 13th Baronet (1948–2025)
- Bruce Anthony Seton, presumed 14th Baronet (born 1957)
