= Drummore =

Coordinates: 54.68984°N 4.89351°W

Drummore: Scottish Gaelic: An Druim Mòr
- Location within Dumfries and Galloway
- Population: 534
- OS grid reference: NX136366
  - Edinburgh: 110 mi (177 km)
  - London: 296 mi (476 km)
- Civil parish: Kirkmaiden
- Council area: Dumfries and Galloway
- Lieutenancy area: Wigtownshire
- Country: Scotland
- Sovereign state: United Kingdom
- Post town: STRANRAER
- Postcode district: DG9
- Dialling code: 01776
- Police: Scotland
- Fire: Scottish
- Ambulance: Scottish
- UK Parliament: Dumfries and Galloway
- Scottish Parliament: Galloway and West Dumfries

Drummore (drum-ORE; Scottish Gaelic: An Druim Mòr, "the great ridge") is the southernmost village in Scotland, located at the southern end of the Rhins of Galloway in Dumfries and Galloway and the historic county of Wigtownshire. It has two satellite clachans (hamlets) nearby, Kirkmaiden and Damnaglaur.

The village lies where the Kildonan Burn runs out to the sea, north of the Mull of Galloway. It is further south than the English cities of Durham and Carlisle. It is historically within the Wigtownshire area and the parish and community of Kirkmaiden. It is 16 miles (26 km) from the nearest major town, the ferry port of Stranraer. In the 2011 census, the population was 534.

Drummore shares its name with High Drummore a mile (1.6 km) up Glen Lee, and also with Drummore Glen 1/2 mile (800 m) to the east. The underlying name is the Gaelic "druim mòr" or "big ridge", and it has been suggested that this reflected the motte associated with the castle of the Adairs of Kinhilt, whose lands were granted in 1602 by King James VI.

The rather scattered incidence of related names, however, makes it more likely that the hill-ridge itself is in question, although at 90 m (300 ft) it is not all that prominent compared to the 140 m (450 ft) Muntloch Fell and Inshanks Fell to the west, or even the 76 m (250 ft) Mull of Galloway itself, 3 miles (4.8 km) to the south.

A branch line was proposed in 1877 linking to the Portpatrick Railway. It was opposed by the feudal landowner, the Earl of Stair, and finally abandoned after the failure of the City of Glasgow Bank in 1882; aspects of the village's street layout still reflect plans for the railway.

== Early history and language ==
The southern Rhins was an area of early Christian activity following the missionary work of Ninian across Luce Bay in the Machars. Shortly before 1860, at Low Curghie less than a mile up the coast north of Drummore, and not far from an extant standing stone, a gravestone was discovered which appeared to date to the 5th or 6th century, with a weathered Latin inscription in which the name "Ventidius" was legible along with another word which translated as "sub-deacon".

Many place-names testify to Norse influence in the southern Rhins, as in many of the west-coast islands and peninsulas, but Drummore's Gaelic name is in tune with the general use of Gaelic in Galloway after the Dark Ages until it was supplanted by English under Presbyterian influence in the 17th century.

== Ecclesiastical history ==
Drummore is the largest settlement in the parish of Kirkmaiden, named after St Maiden or Medan. The parish church was originally some five miles (8.0 km) south of the village, but in 1638 the parishioners, citing the inconvenience of the journey to church, secured the building of a new church known as Kirk Covenant on Core Hill, about a mile west of Drummore. Following the Disruption of 1843, a new church was again built, for worshippers in the Free Church of Scotland, and this time in the village itself, in the street now known as Stair Street. Early in the 20th century the two congregations were reunited. Now worship is habitually at the church within Drummore, with one service each month in the summer being held at Kirk Covenant.

== Drummore Harbour ==
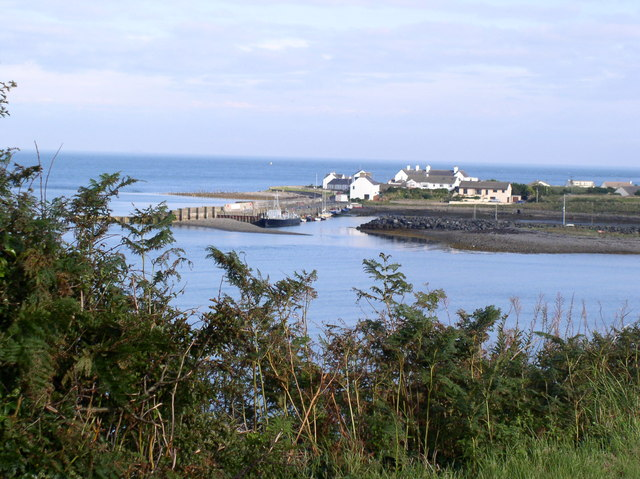
Drummore Harbour

Drummore Harbour, July 2008

The harbour, facing north and shielded by the Rhins from the prevailing southwesterly wind, was developed with a jetty in the early 19th century to serve a lime manufacturing industry. For many years in the hands of the UK's Ministry of Defence as part of the management of their bombing range and weapon development area offshore in Luce Bay, it was taken over in 2004 for a nominal sum by the Drummore Harbour Trust Ltd, which announced the aim of developing its use for pleasure boats.

This disposal by the MoD attracted attention in the UK Parliament as a result of disputes over the rights of access to the harbour by fishermen, and a subsequent Court of Session judgement confirmed a Victorian precedent that no right of harbour existed. Failure of the Drummore Harbour Trust to widen its membership beyond the initial two individual members, or to begin its promised investment programme, caused increasing concern.

In July 2008 the Dumfries and Galloway Council decided to seek an Empowerment Order under the Harbours Act 1964 which would enable the council to take over the harbour land and operations, following the pattern of a number of successful harbours along the Solway coast. This was not achieved.

In 2015 the Harbour Trust became liable for a £15,000 personal injury claim, and it then dissolved itself, so the harbour reverted to the Crown Estate. As of June 2018 the Drummore residents are attempting to buy the harbour, via the Kirkmaiden Community Harbour Trust.

== Character and facilities ==
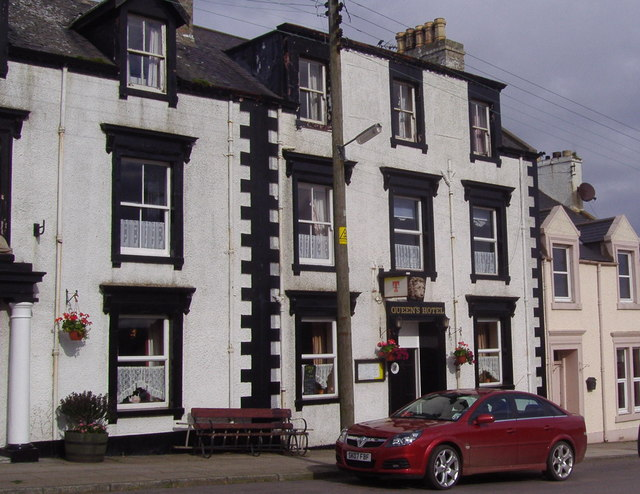
The Queen's Hotel

Older residents recall a time when the main streets were full of shops, including no fewer than three bakers (one on the corner of Stair and Mill Streets). Even recently there have been significant casualties, including on Mill Street the bank, the butcher's (now wholesale only, as a result of health legislation), and the Harbour Stores (formerly the second general shop, with an additional speciality in fishing supplies).

The village's facilities still however include the Mariners Coffee Shop, the Queen's Hotel, a post office, a volunteer tourist office and a general shop on Mill Street; a garage for repairs (no fuel); a primary school; a doctor's surgery and pharmacy; the Ship Inn on the shore; a bowling club and children's play park; a number of holiday cottages; and two caravan sites near sandy beaches (one of them associated with another pub). The Kirkmaiden Community Council meets monthly in Drummore. Housing is mixed, ranging from listed Victorian residential and commercial properties to modern bungalows and harled council houses.

Within living memory a number of street names have changed, notably Stair Street (formerly Church Street), Mill Street (formerly Main Street) and Harbour Road (formerly Quay Road). Following a landslip in the 1960s the former Lower Road, which had brought traffic in along the coast to Shore Street, was barred to traffic. It is now a footpath, set thickly about by Japanese knotweed; in the summer of 2014 it was decorated anonymously with fairy doors.
