= Aberdeenshire (disambiguation) =

Aberdeenshire is one of the unitary council areas of Scotland.

Aberdeenshire may also refer to:

- Aberdeenshire (historic), a registration county and lieutenancy area of Scotland, also the historic county that was subsumed into Grampian Region in 1975
- Aberdeenshire (Parliament of Scotland constituency) to 1707
- Aberdeenshire (UK Parliament constituency), a constituency in the Parliaments of Great Britain and the United Kingdom between 1801 and 1868
