= Pitmedden =

Village in Scotland

Pitmedden: Scottish Gaelic: Baile Meadhain
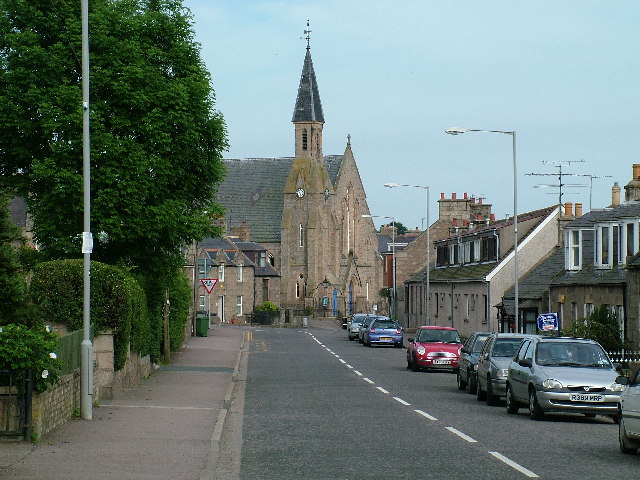
- Main Street and Church in Pitmedden

- Location within Aberdeenshire
- Population: 1,400 (2020)
- OS grid reference: NJ892274
- Council area: Aberdeenshire
- Lieutenancy area: Aberdeenshire
- Country: Scotland
- Sovereign state: United Kingdom
- Post town: ELLON
- Postcode district: AB41
- Dialling code: 01651
- Police: Scotland
- Fire: Scottish
- Ambulance: Scottish
- UK Parliament: Gordon and Buchan
- Scottish Parliament: Aberdeenshire East

Pitmedden is a rural village in the parish of Udny, Aberdeenshire, Scotland, situated midway between Ellon and Oldmeldrum, and approximately 16 miles (26 km) from Aberdeen. It shares services with the village of Udny Green to the south-west.

The village is at the junction of the B9000 and B999 roads, with the A920 immediately to the north and west. By road, it is 5.6 miles (9.0 km) to Oldmeldrum, and 5.7 miles (9.2 km) to Ellon; but 5.2 miles (8.4 km) by line to Oldmeldrum, and 4.34 miles (6.98 km) by line to Ellon.

== History ==
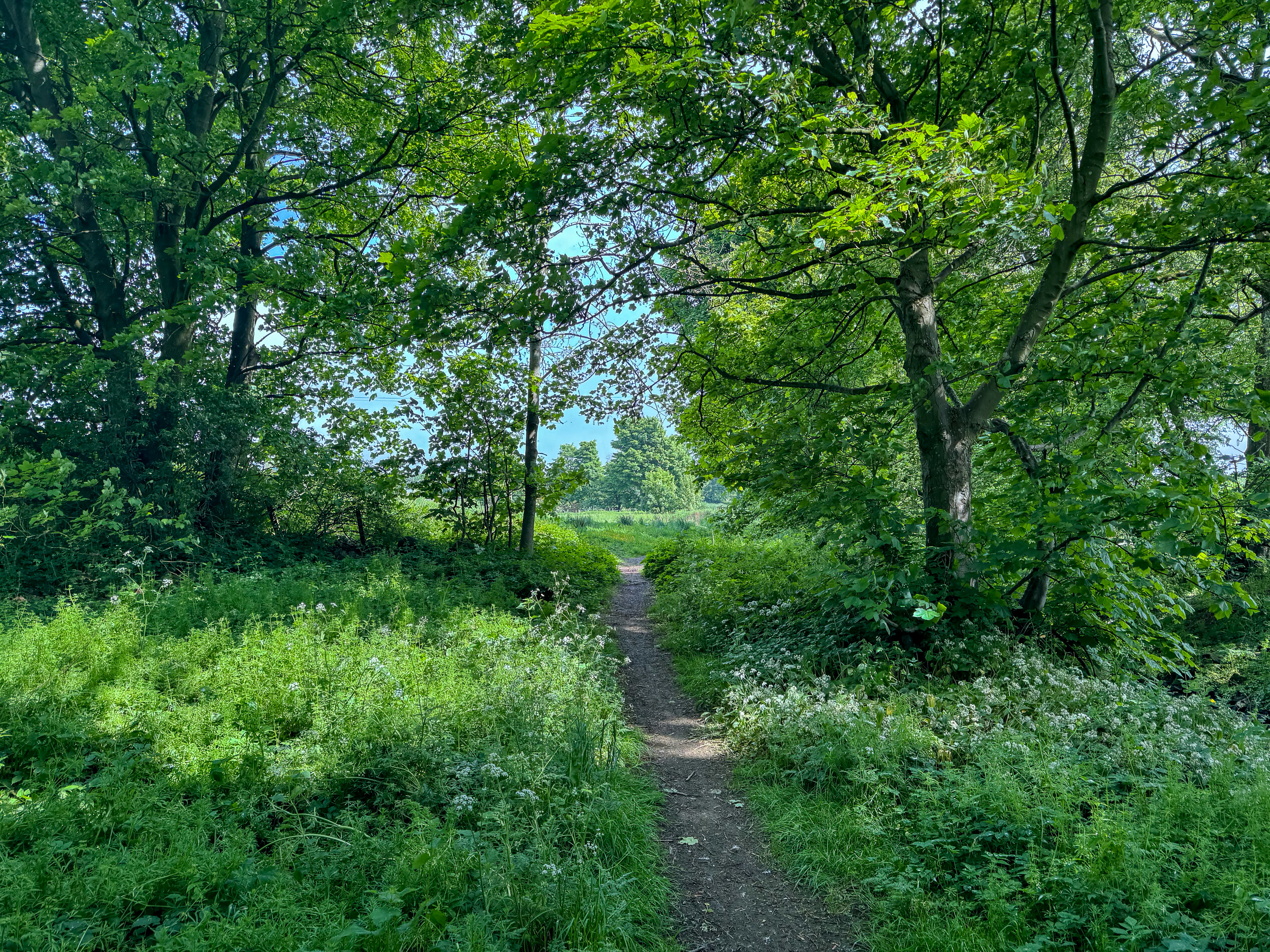
Riverside path beside the Bronie Burn (2024).

The village's name in Gaelic means "middle".

Prehistoric period flint arrowheads have been found just north-east of the village. A red granite ball was located just south of the village on Home Farm, that was suggested to be from the Neolithic period. When undertaking road works in 1836 on the Oldmeldrum Road on the west of the village, a Bronze Age sword was located. At 1.3 miles (2.1 km) to the east-south-east were numerous finds including stone spearheads, stone celts, stone cup, quhorles, silver and copper coins, grooved stone ball, and a quern.

The 14th/15th-century Udny Castle is 0.7 miles (1.1 km) south-west of the village, and was built by the Udny family.

The heritage-listed 16th-century Tolquhon Castle ruins are within 1.5 miles (2.4 km) north-west of the village, which was built by the seventh Laird of Tolquhon, of the Clan Forbes, from estates acquired in 1420.

Within view of the Tolquhon Castle were lands occupied by Alexander Panton and his family until about 1619 when it was sold to a Seton family relative. A castle or tower was erected in time. This was later rebuilt as Pitmedden House with gardens. Following a fire, the residence was rebuilt c. 19th century. The now-tourist attraction of Pitmedden Garden, less than 0.6 miles (0.97 km) north-west of the village, was created in the 17th century by Sir Alexander Seton. The house was later occupied in the 1800s by shipping owner and politician George Thompson. About 1893 it was purchased by Major James Keith (1879–1953), an innovative and respected farmer who was part of the Scottish Agricultural Commission visitations to Denmark (1904), Ireland (1906), and Canada and Australia (1910). In 1952, the year before his death, Keith gifted the garden to the National Trust for Scotland. The grounds included a 9 feet (2.7 m) 1675 sundial.

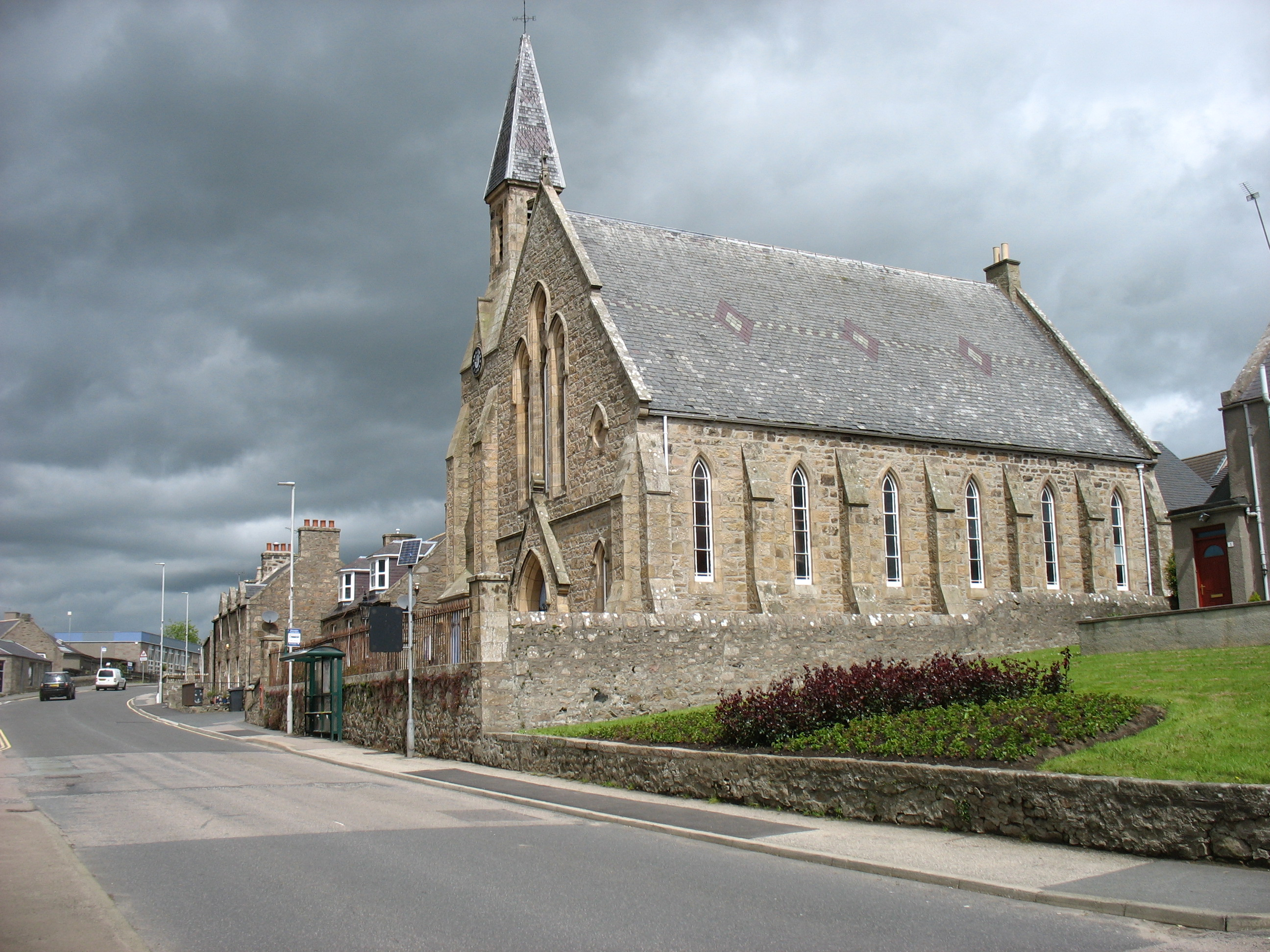
Church from eastern end of the town (2019).

The Pitmedden Church (57.336778°N 2.179333°W) was founded in 1843, and the actual church built in 1864 as the United Free Church of Udny. A triangular stained-glass window was a gift from the founding 1844 minister, Reverend George Archibald. The Free Church's manse later became the Linsmohr Hotel.

By 1870 the village and area was quite small and rural:

- a number of presumed farms (to the north: East Newseat, North Alehouse, South Alehouse, Mains of Dumbreck (and castle), Coulielaire, Iriewells, and Boghead; to the east: Bonnyton, Mill of Torry, Ladyhill, Mosstown, Mosscroft of Allathan, Thriepfield, Moss-side, Tillyfar, Cloysterseat, West Cloysterseat, Allathan, Milltown of Allathan; and to the south: Houseaside, Mill of Udny, Mosshead, West Craig, Ardmore, Denend, Bridgend);
- the closest railway station was Logierieve (1861–1965; to the east), on the Formartine and Buchan section of the Great North of Scotland Railway;
- Pitmedden House (to the north-west), a forest around Milltown of Allathan, and the Allathan Quarry (to the east);
- the blacksmith was to the north of the village by 0.57 miles (0.92 km);
- a 800 yards (730 m) long rifle range (57.33964°N 2.16994°W) was beside Bronie Burn near the Milltown of Allathan farm; and
- the village itself was an assemblage of about twenty houses along the Newburgh–Oldmeldrum road. The Free Church and a small school were on the east side of the village, and the church manse the first building on the western approach.

During World War II, Pitmedden had a prisoner-of-war camp (57.337139°N 2.183194°W), holding both Italian and then German POWs. This was located on the south side of the Bronie Burn, and there was an access bridge to access it. The entrance to the camp was about 100 yards (91 m) from the Aberdeen/Tarves/Oldmeldrum fork in Pitmedden, on the Oldmeldrum road. On 25 October 1945, at the Milton of Dumbreck farm, 36-year-old Italian POW Martino Favilli died of an illness. POWs cycled each day to work on local farms; one local farmer still has small items made by the POWs. The camp was not notable amongst the list of Scottish POW camps.

After 2:15 p.m. Wednesday 24 December 1941, an RAF Bristol Blenheim IVF light bomber with RNZAF pilot Dick Poynter, two flight crew, and two military passengers departed from RAF Dyce going to RAF Wick when the starboard (right) engine started misfiring. The flames were extinguished although the engine was no longer working. The aircraft at one point then stalled, and the Blenheim crashed into the Pitmedden kirkyard, with just air gunner Wyn-Jones surviving but badly injured. All remains were repatriated except for Poynter who was buried in Dyce.

In 2020, the Scottish Government approved plans on appeal for a development of 64 homes in Pitmedden after earlier refusals by Aberdeenshire Council.

== Geography ==
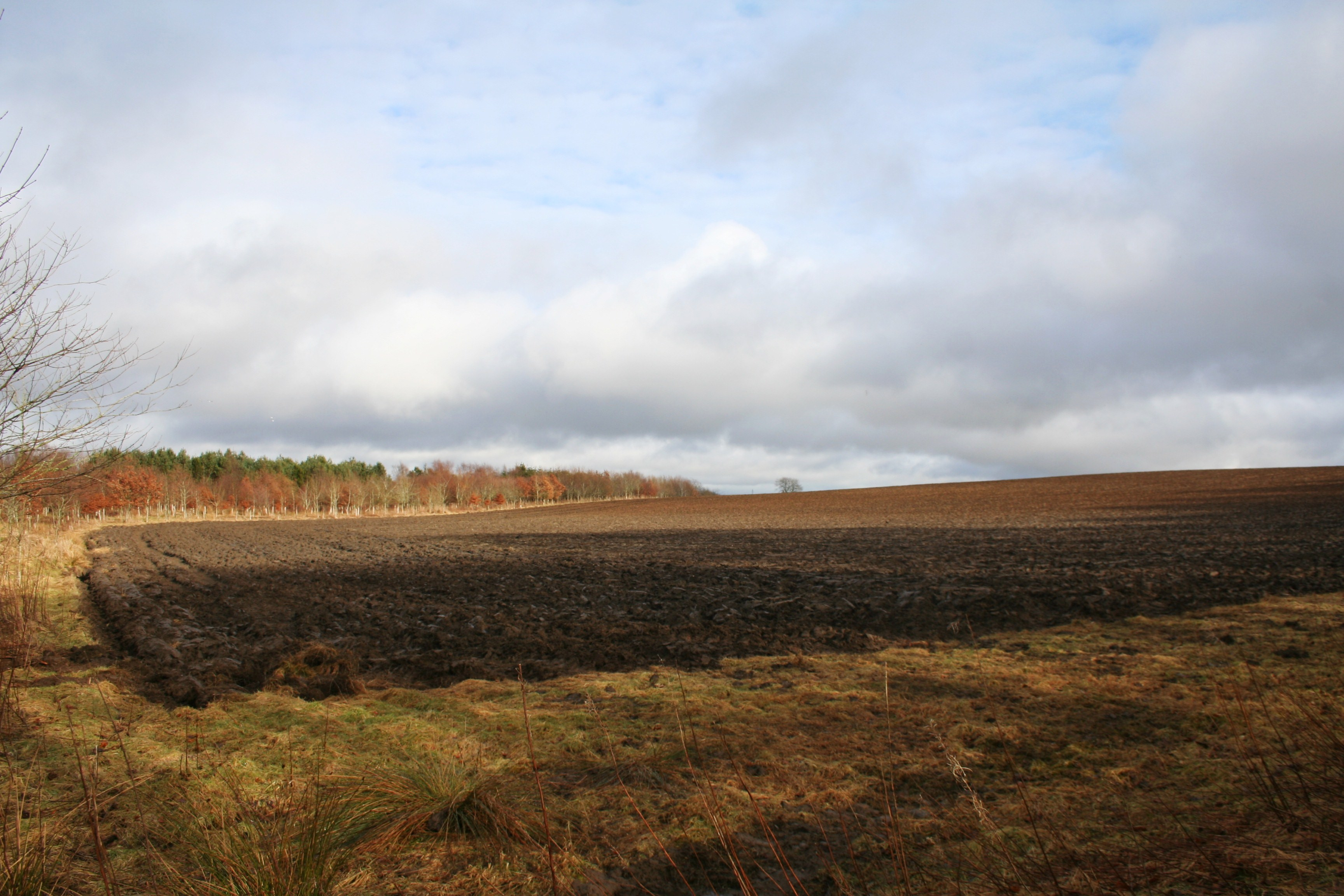
Ploughed land on western side of the town (2010).

The Bronie Burn is a tributary of the River Ythan. The village is surrounded by farmland.

== Language ==
Doric or of the 'Mid-Northern A' Scots dialect is spoken in the area. Language use of the area was studied as a typical Aberdeenshire village of a primarily agricultural economy being impacted by settlement by external persons such as from the petroleum industry in Aberdeen. The 2005-published study noted that items such as the weather – important to the former widespread farming life – have understandably become less in conversation.

== Governance ==
Separate to coming under Ward 8 (Mid-Formartine) of Aberdeenshire Council, the area is represented by the Udny Community Council.

Pitmedden, along with the Parish of Udny, is served by the Udny Community Trust, which owns and operates an Enercon E48 wind turbine at Tillymaud to the south of Pitmedden. Udny Community Trust distributes the profits from the wind energy project for local charitable purposes.

== Facilities ==
The village has shops, a village hall, lawn bowls club, and parks.

The Pitmedden School and Nursery ({57.337611°N 2.181056°W), operated by Aberdeenshire Council, in 2024 had 163 students and a nursery of 44 children. For P1 to P7, students will then go onto Meldrum Academy. French is taught as a modern language. There are gardening, netball, and chess clubs. A free lunch is provided from P1 to P5. School/sports houses are Seton (barony), Saint Medan, Keith (innovative farmer), and Bronie (local burn).

Outside the village are the grounds of the Formartine United Football Club, a senior association football club that plays in the Highland League.

The former Linsmohr Hotel (57.337778°N 2.182722°W), after it closed in August 2019 due to economic hardship, was redeveloped into a community café by the Udny Community Trust with support from the Scottish Land Fund.

The village's only public house, The Craft Bar, received regional recognition in 2025 from the Campaign for Real Ale (CAMRA) as Pub of the Year for Aberdeen, Grampian and the Northern Isles. A whisky shop and tasting venue, Still Spirit, located near Pitmedden, has been awarded a five-star tourist shop rating in 2022 by VisitScotland.

Pitmedden Garden also houses the Museum of Farming Life, showing a farm of the early 1900s when it would have been at the owner James Keith.

The village and most of Udny are served by a community newsletter called the Pitmedden News, although this may have ceased by 2024.

The contemporary Hilltop House using a farmhouse look was nominated and won Series 7 (2025) of Scotland's Home of the Year reality television show.

The village and surrounds also host the annual Pitmedden Festival of Dancing, for highland dancing competitions.

A number of self-guided walks are around the village, as well as going to Udny Green and Tarves.

== Notable persons ==
- Terry McDermott (b. 1977), singer-songwriter. Raised in the village.
- Alexander Seaton (1639–1719), later Baron Pitmedden. Judge and politician.
- George Thompson of Pitmedden (1804–1895), Whig politician, Lord Provost of Aberdeen, founder of the Aberdeen Line shipping company. Later lived in Pitmedden House (of Pitmedden Garden).

== See also ==
- Formartine community area
