= Port Logan =

Coordinates: 54.72315°N 4.95644°W

Port Logan: Scottish Gaelic: Port Neasaig
- Location within Dumfries and Galloway
- OS grid reference: NX097405
  - Edinburgh: 110 mi (177 km)
  - London: 299 mi (481 km)
- Council area: Dumfries and Galloway
- Lieutenancy area: Wigtown
- Country: Scotland
- Sovereign state: United Kingdom
- Post town: Stranraer
- Postcode district: DG9
- Police: Scotland
- Fire: Scottish
- Ambulance: Scottish
- UK Parliament: Dumfries and Galloway
- Scottish Parliament: Galloway and Upper Nithsdale

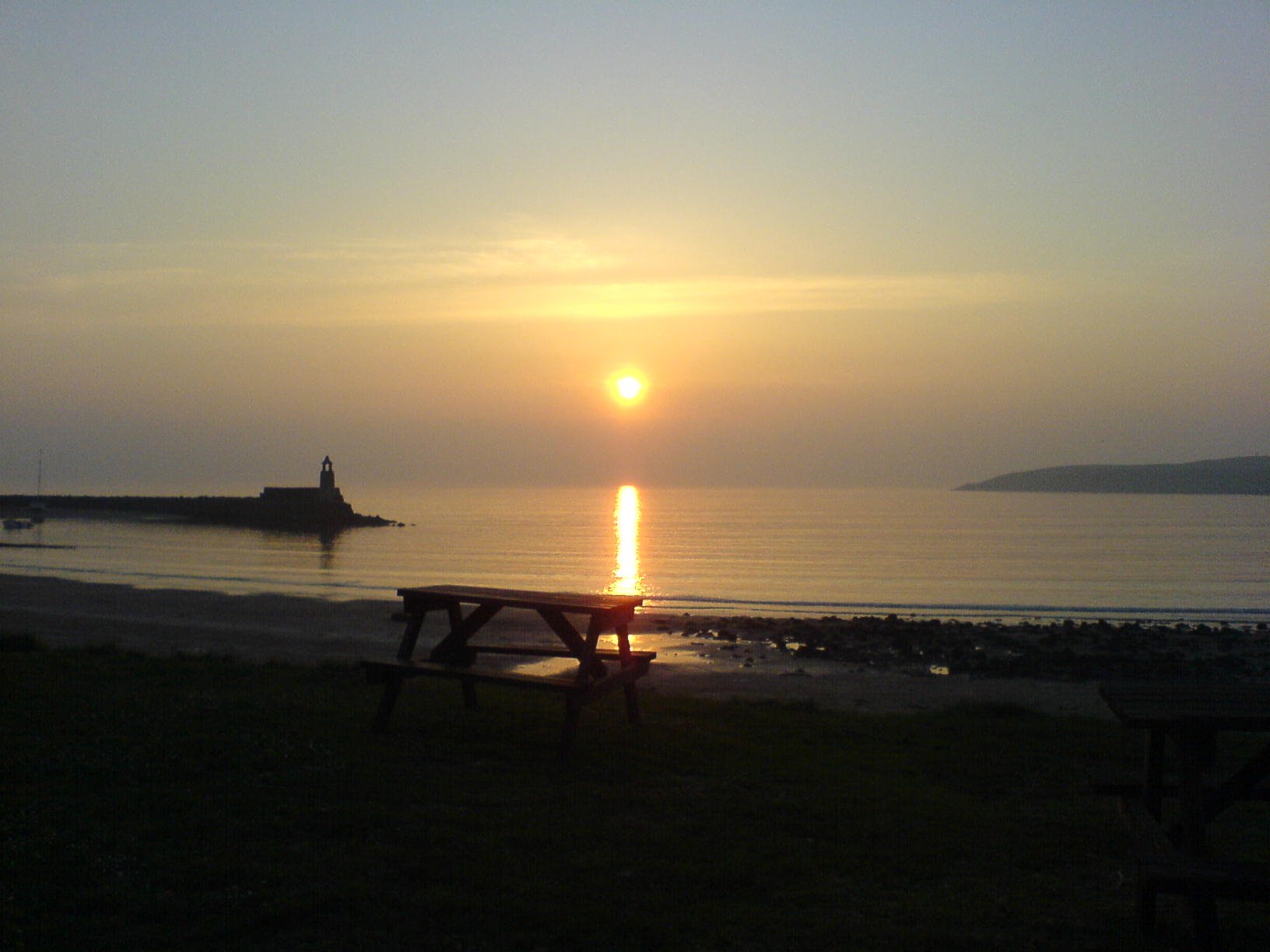
View over the harbour of Port Logan out into the Irish Sea: Telford's bell tower is clearly visible

Port Logan, formerly Port Nessock, is a small village in the parish of Kirkmaiden in the Rhins of Galloway in Wigtownshire. The Gaelic name is Port Neasaig.

Port Nessock Bay is now all that remains of the western end of a strait that in post-glacial times separated the main part of what is now the Rinns of Galloway from three smaller islands to its south. There was a ruined pier in the bay in 1790, at which time kelp and samphire were gathered on the coast to the south.

The village was planned; it was created by Colonel Andrew MacDowall (Douall), the laird of Logan, in 1818. MacDowall erected a quay and bell tower designed by Thomas Telford, and a causewayed road leading to them. This causeway blocked the view to seaward of the existing houses on the Lower Road (Laigh Row), whose inhabitants MacDowall expected to move to a new Upper Road; in the event, they welcomed the shelter it provided from the brisk onshore winds, and preferred to stay put, though subsequently most of them added a second storey so recovering some of the sea view.

== Facilities ==
Facilities include a village hall which used to be the local Lifeboat Station. It is run by a local committee and completely self-funding. In recent years it has been used for a range of social events such as weddings and to celebrate Hogmanay and St Andrew's Night. It is sometimes used for meetings of the Kirkmaiden Community Council. The hall also hosts a community cinema run by local volunteers and screens films from November to April each year, once a month.

== Attractions ==
The Logan Fish Pond, Logan Botanic Garden & Logan House Garden are located near Port Logan.

Logan Fish Pond was built by Colonel Andrew McDouall, originally as a fish larder for Logan House, circa 1788 and completed around 1800, with a Keeper's Cottage and Bathing Hut which are part of the Logan Fishpond Marine Life Centre.

== Media associations ==
The village was used between 2001 and 2003 as the setting for a popular BBC series, Two Thousand Acres of Sky starring actress Michelle Collins.

2017 saw the filming of The Vanishing starring Gerard Butler, Peter Mullan and newcomer Connor Swindells.

== USAAF Douglas C-47 crash ==
On 27 July 1944, two Douglas C-47 Skytrains (one was serial number 42-93038) of the United States Army Air Forces were on a flight from Filton to a stop at Prestwick before flying on to the United States. The flight was transporting wounded soldiers. The flight encountered bad weather, and the pilot of 42-93038 tried to gain altitude to clear the cliffs. The C-47 crashed into the cliff side at Port Logan, where all 22 passengers and crew died.
