= Aberdeenshire (Parliament of Scotland constituency) =

Before the Acts of Union 1707, the barons of the shire of Aberdeen elected commissioners to represent them in the unicameral Parliament of Scotland and in the Convention of the Estates. The number of commissioners was increased from two to four in 1690.

From 1708 Aberdeenshire was represented by one Member of Parliament in the House of Commons of Great Britain.

== List of shire commissioners ==
- 1596: John Leslie of Balquhain and Alexander Fraser of Fraserburgh
- 1612–17: Alexander Gordon of Cluny
- 1629: Erskine of Balhagardie and Crombie of Kemnay
- 1631, 1632: Irvine of Drum
- 1639–41, 1644, 1645–46: Sir William Forbes of Craigievar and Fintray
- 1643, 1648, 1661–63: Sir Alexander Fraser of Philorth
- 1648: The Laird of Udny (Udny)
- 1649–50: Arthur Forbes of Eight
- 1649–50: William Forbes the younger of Leslie
- 1650–51: The Laird of Glenkindlie (Strachan)
- 1661–63: Colonel George Keith of Aden
- 1665 (convention), 1667 (convention): Sir John Baird of Newbyth
- 1665 (convention), 1667 (convention), 1669–74, 1678 (convention): Adam Urquhart of Meldrum
- 1669–74, 1678 (convention), 1681–82: Sir George Gordon of Haddo
- 1681–82, 1685–86: Sir Alexander Seton of Pitmedden
- 1685–86: Sir Charles Maitland of Pittrichie
- 1689 (convention), 1689–1701: Sir John Forbes of Craigievar and Fintray
- 1689 (convention), 1689–1701, 1702–07: James Moir of Stoniewood
- 1693–98, 1700–01: Sir Samuel Forbes of Foveran
- 1693–1702: Sir James Elphinstone of Logie
- 1702–07: Sir William Seton of Pitmedden
- 1702–07: Sir Alexander Gordone of Pitlurg
- 1702–07: John Udnie of that Ilk

== See also ==
- List of constituencies in the Parliament of Scotland at the time of the Union
