= Sir John Gordon, 1st Baronet, of Haddo =

Scottish nobleman, 1st Baronet of Haddo

Sir John Gordon, 1st Baronet (1610 – 19 July 1644) was a Scottish Royalist supporter of Charles I during the Wars of the Three Kingdoms. Gordon distinguished himself against the covenanters at Turriff, 1639, and joined Charles I in England. Created a baronet in 1642 for his services, he was excommunicated and forced to surrender by the Covenanters under Argyll at Kellie in 1644 and was subsequently beheaded for treason at Edinburgh.

John was the son of George Gordon (eldest son of James Gordon of Haddo and Methlick), and Margaret, daughter of Sir Alexander Bannerman. George predeceased his father, and John succeeded to his grandfather's estates on the latter's death in November 1624.

== Career ==
Gordon was the son of George Gordon (d. 1610), by Margaret, daughter of Sir Alexander Bannerman of Elsick in Aberdeenshire. He succeeded his grandfather, James Gordon of Methlick and Haddo, Aberdeenshire, in November 1624. In 1639, Gordon was appointed by Charles I second-in-command of the forces raised against the Covenanters, under the Marquess of Huntly. He took a distinguished part in the skirmish at Turriff on 14 May 1639, where the Royal forces dispersed a gathering of the Covenanters. Gordon was made a baronet on 13 August 1642 for his role in this affair, an honour which rendered him further odious to the Covenanters. After the conclusion of the treaty of pacification on 20 June, Gordon repaired to the king at Newark. When Huntly raised an army for the King that year, Sir John again joined him, and both were excommunicated by the General Assembly in April. Huntly was forced to retreat, but Sir John tried to hold Kellie against a powerful army led by the "glied Argyll".

For his opposition to the covenant, letters of intercommuning were issued by the convention against him in November 1643, and an order granted for his apprehension. The sheriff of Aberdeen proceeded accordingly, in January 1644, to his house of Kellie at the head of a large force, but Gordon had escaped. He joined the Marquis of Huntly in behalf of the king, and sentence of excommunication was pronounced against them both by order of the committee of the general assembly on 16 April 1644. On the retreat of the marquis's forces, Gordon attempted to defend his house of Kellie against the Marquis of Argyll. Promised honourable terms of surrender by his cousin, Earl Marischal, then in Argyll's army, Gordon capitulated unconditionally on 8 May 1644. Argyll released most of the garrison, but held Gordon and a few officers and plundered Kellie in violation of his terms, much to Marischal's dissatisfaction. Gordon was brought to Edinburgh and imprisoned in the western part of St. Giles' Cathedral, which thereby acquired the name of "Haddo's Hole". He was tried for high treason against the Estates for his actions in 1639, and for maintaining a garrison against the Covenanting armies. Gordon defended himself on the grounds that his actions at Turriff had been pardoned under the Pacification of Berwick, and that he had had the King's authority in his deeds, to no avail. He was found guilty and beheaded at the Mercat Cross in Edinburgh on 19 July 1644.

== Family ==
He married Mary Forbes, daughter of William Forbes of Tolquhon, in 1630, and had issue:

- Sir John Gordon, 2nd Baronet, of Haddo (c1632-1665)
- Patrick Gordon (born between 1633 and 1636)
- George Gordon, 1st Earl of Aberdeen (1637–1720)
- Charles Gordon (born about 1638)
- James Gordon of Saphak (about 1639 - about 1683)
- Janet Gordon (born c. 1644)
- Jean Gordon

== Sources ==
- "Gordon, John (d.1644)" . Dictionary of National Biography. London: Smith, Elder & Co. 1885–1900.

Baronetage of Nova Scotia
New creation	Baronet (of Haddo, Aberdeen); 1642–1644	Succeeded by John Gordon
