= Sir John Gordon, 2nd Baronet, of Haddo =

Scottish nobleman

Sir John Gordon, 2nd Baronet (c. 1632–1665) was the eldest son of Sir John Gordon, 1st Baronet, of Haddo and Mary Forbes. He succeeded to the title of 2nd Baronet on the execution of his father for treason on 19 July 1644, but due to his father's attainder, was under forfeiture until the Restoration in 1660. On his death in 1665 without male issue the baronetcy devolved upon his younger brother, who was later created 1st Earl of Aberdeen.

== Family ==
He married Mary Forbes, daughter of Alexander Forbes, 1st Lord Forbes of Pitsligo and Jean Keith, and had issue:

- Jean Gordon (born c1661), married Sir James Gordon, 5th Baronet Gordon of Lesmore

Baronetage of Nova Scotia
Preceded by John Gordon	Baronet (of Haddo, Aberdeen); 1644–1665	Succeeded by George Gordon
