= Kirkmaiden =

Coordinates: 54.693°N 4.911°W

Kirkmaiden: Scottish Gaelic: Cille M'Eudan
- Location within Dumfries and Galloway
- Population: 685 (2001)
- OS grid reference: NX1236
- Civil parish: Kirkmaiden
- Council area: Dumfries and Galloway
- Lieutenancy area: Wigtown
- Country: Scotland
- Sovereign state: United Kingdom
- Post town: Stranraer
- Postcode district: DG9
- Dialling code: 01776
- Police: Scotland
- Fire: Scottish
- Ambulance: Scottish
- UK Parliament: Dumfries and Galloway
- Scottish Parliament: Galloway and West Dumfries

Kirkmaiden is a parish in the Rhins of Galloway, the most southerly in Scotland; the present Church of Scotland parish has the same name and is approximately coterminous with the original pre-Reformation parish.

The parish takes its name from the clachan or hamlet of Kirkmaiden, itself named after the medieval Saint Medan, whose identity, name, sex, and origin are all disputed. The name "Kirkmaiden" is thought to be a corruption of a purer Gaelic "Kilmaiden" by either Scandinavians or Angles with a knowledge of Gaelic.

It is also the area and name of a community council, which meets generally in Drummore and occasionally in Port Logan.

== Settlements ==
There are two main settlements in Kirkmaiden: Drummore and Port Logan. The small hamlet of Kirkmaiden itself, which contains the present-day church, is about a mile west of Drummore.

== Ecclesiastical history ==
The parish church was originally some five miles south of Drummore, at a site on the Kirkburn, not far from the Mull of Galloway; the name of the nearest cove, Portankill, suggests that originally many worshippers attended Mass by boat. The church was dedicated to the Virgin Mary, and in a cave on the eastern shore of the parish, at some time, a hermit lived. On 15 July 1393, Pope Clement VII authorised Finlay, Abbot of Soulseat, to annex Kirkmaiden parish church in 'le Rynnis' to augment the income of the abbey.

In 1638, the parishioners, citing the inconvenience of the journey to church, secured the construction of a new church, known as Kirk Covenant, on Core Hill, about a mile west of Drummore. The patron was the Earl of Stair.

Following the Disruption of 1843, a new church was again built, for worshippers in the Free Church of Scotland, and this time in the village itself, in the street now known as Stair Street. Early in the 20th century, the two congregations were reunited. Now worship is habitually held at the church in Drummore, with one summer service each month held at Kirk Covenant.

== Iron Age and early Middle Ages ==
A substantial earthwork, measuring 400 m long, cuts off an area of about 57 ha at the eastern end of the Mull of Galloway. In most places, it comprises three ditches with medial banks, the inner bank being the larger, measuring between 3.1 m and 4 m in thickness, with an external height of up to 2.2 m. It is believed the ramparts make this the largest Iron Age stronghold in Britain. It is situated 330 m south-southeast of the earthwork at the Tarbet.

About 330 m north-northwest of the above earthwork, and situated at the narrow isthmus between the bays of East and West Tarbet, an earthwork cuts across the neck of the Mull of Galloway south of the enclosed fields of the Mull farm. The bank is 2.3 m wide and 0.5 m high with possible facing stones exposed.

== Late Middle Ages ==
The Gordons of Clanyard Castle were powerful men in the area, and their daughters married into Kirkmaiden families. Alexander Gordon of Castle Clanyard received a bell cast in 1534 for Kirkmaiden Church. A Castle Clanyard Reconstruction in Sketchup is on YouTube.

Killumpha Tower is another tower house in the parish.

== Early modern period ==
The population of the parish was 1,051 in 1755, 1,380 in the 1790s, and 1,613 in 1801. In 1790, the Statistical Account reported an abundance of fish, including oysters and lobsters; cattle; plentiful potatoes, corn, and other vegetables; quantities of thriving barley and oats; and flax. Trees, however, did not thrive. The farmers improved their land with lime, which was brought from Whitehaven or Ireland. At that time, some endowments for the poor of the parish are mentioned, including £100 from Andrew McMurray a merchant in London, £100 from Andrew McDowal (Lord Bankton, one of the judges of the Court of Session: the McDowal family were lairds of Logan), and £400 from William Adair of Flixton, all three of whom had been born in the parish. The nearest market was in Stranraer, and there were three schools and three licensed ale-houses.

== Archaeology ==
See Archaeological and Historical Collections relating to Ayrshire and Galloway. vol. V. pp. 62–63 by Rev. George Wilson, wherein he describes forts: (a) 2 across the narrow isthmus from east to west, Tarbert. (b) One north-west of West Tarbert, not on the O.S. map. (c) Dunora or Dunorrich. (d) Three forts with only traces of a ditch. (e) Dunman, a large fort. (f) Crummag Head, a circular stone fort. (g) One between Clanyard and Logan Bay. (h) Dunichinie, a large circular fort north of Mull of Logan. (i) Moat Hill at Drummore.

(e) Dunman Fort, an Early Iron Age Fort on the western shore of the Rhins. The defences along the inner crests of the natural gullies on the north-east and south-east consisted of a wall originally 2.4–3.6 m thick. The internal measurement is about 110 m north-west by 100 m south-east, but no structures were visible within. There are entrances on the north, north-east, and south, with a possible third on the north, where a natural terrace provides access to the interior immediately beyond the wall's end.

Walling is visible on the north, east, and south sides and some on the east, consisting of an inner wall face and heather-covered rubble about 3.0 m wide. The wall follows the crest of a scarp over 7 m high around the north, east, and south sides of the summit. The wall peters out on the north and south to south-west, and there are no visible defences on the west where the ground falls away steeply to the sea 150 m below.

There are four approaches to the fort, but only one in the north-east is used as an entrance. A shallow hollow descends the scarp at the north to north-east entrance, which is blocked with three large boulders. At the south entrance, a natural terrace drops obliquely down the scarp into a hollow 2.5 m broad with a bank up to 3 m thick and 0.6 m high on its outer lip.

(f) Crammag Head on the western shore of the Rhins was a circular dun or broch with outworks about 19.5 m in diameter overall, but its wall has been reduced to little more than the basal course of the outer face around the west. The granite facing-stones measure up to 1 m in length by 0.65 m in breadth and 0.65 m in height, and a maximum of three courses is visible on the north-west.

The interior on the west, which Crammag Head Light now occupies, has been raised to 1.8 m above the outer face with material from a ditch immediately east of the dun.

The ditch is broken by a causeway 2.5 m wide, which is faced with granite boulders along its south side. To the north of the causeway, the ditch measures 9 m in breadth and varies from 1.3 m in depth externally to 2 m internally, but to the south, it is only 6.5 m in breadth and 1.1 m in depth. The ditch is only visible at the southern end of the rampart and measures up to 5.5 m in breadth by 0.3 m in depth. The entrance through the outer defence was probably at its southern end, where the rampart and ditch stop 3 m and 5 m short of the edge of the promontory, respectively.

About 20 m east of the ditch, there is an outer rampart with an external ditch. At its north end, the rampart has been reduced to little more than a scatter of stones, but towards the south, it is up to 4.4 m thick and 0.5 m high. Vitrified stone was recovered from the outer rampart.

It had an entrance passage on the east side, where the wall was at least 4.5–6 m thick.

Core Hill Fort, an Iron Dark Age Fort, is situated on the summit of Core Hill, immediately south of Kirkmaiden churchyard. It measures 28.3 m by 21 m within the inner rampart, which varies from a low bank 3.4 m thick and 0.5 m high, to a scarp up to 2.3 m high externally. A stone axe was found in the interior.

High Drummore Motte and Bailey, in the mid-eastern side of the Rhins. The mound is 10 ft high, but is 23 ft high to the east and protected on the west by a rampart and ditch. The top is about 40 ft in diameter and has a hollow about 18 ft across and 3 to 4 ft deep, with an entrance on the east side. A rampart goes down the slope towards the east with an interspace of 60 ft. On the south, there was an entrance about 8 ft wide at the base of the mound, and on the south side of the base, the rampart is about 24 ft thick at the base and 6 ft high externally. Between it and the edge of the glen lies a terrace 20 ft wide near the mound, narrowing to 6 ft to the east. The bailey lies on the east and measures 28 m by 20 m within a bank up to 7.2 m thick and 2.5 m high on the south, which enclosed the motte.

A 5th – 6th century grave covered by a stone slab bearing a badly weathered Latin inscription. The original description of the stone (now lost) records that the name Ventidius was legible alongside another name, which translates as "sub-deacon". It is thought to be the 5th stone from Kirkmadrine. The grave is much later in date. A standing stone is situated 460 m NNW of Low Curghie.

Cairngaan, on the southern tip of the Rhins, possibly Bronze-Age.

== Kirkmaiden in the Machars ==
A ruined church south of Port William in the Machars, near Monreith in the parish of Glasserton, is called "Kirkmaiden-in-Fernis". In the churchyard here is the grave of Captain François Thurot, a French privateer in the Seven Years' War.

== Natural History Group ==
A 'Kirkmaiden Natural History Group' is based in Drummore; it holds monthly indoor meetings and conducts field outings throughout the year. It has a website with photographs of its work.

== The Gallery ==
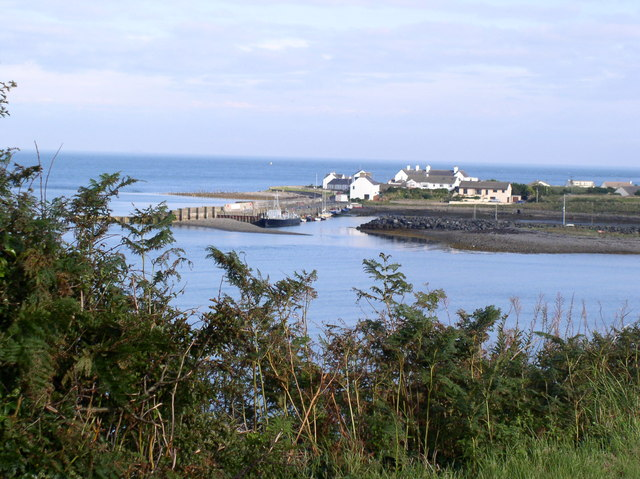
Drummore Harbour.

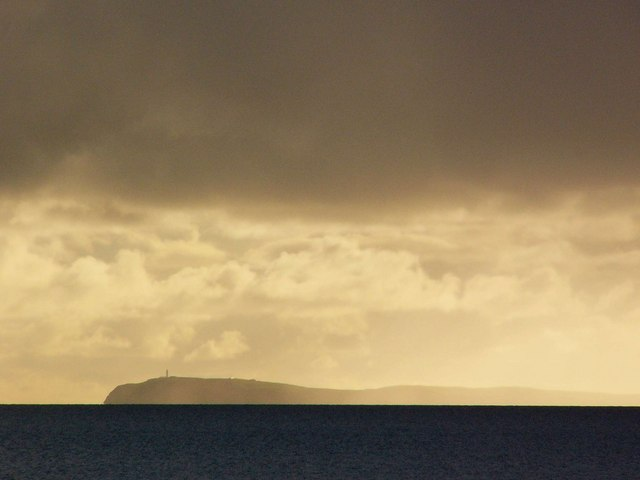
Mull of Galloway.

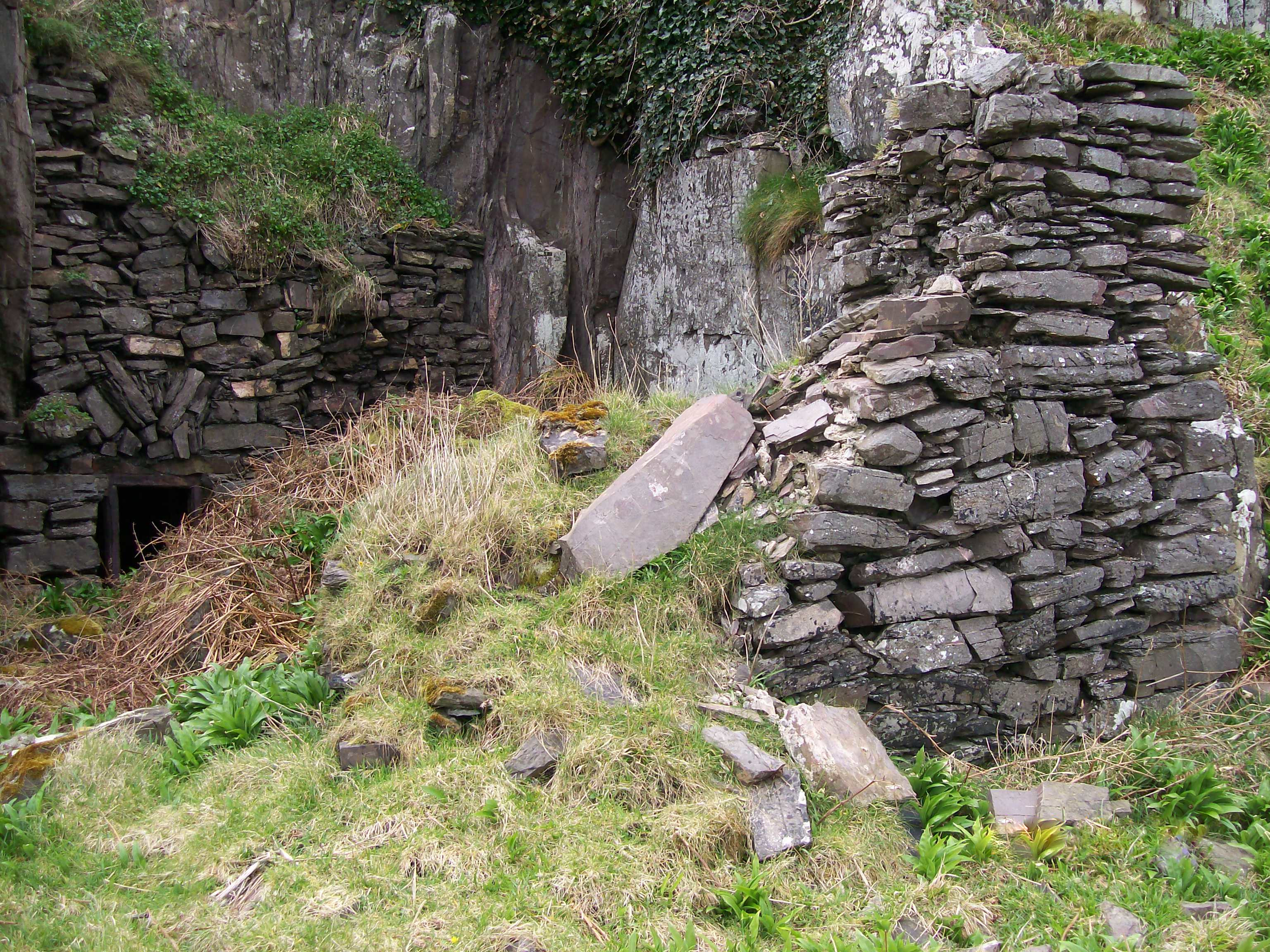
Ruins of St Medan's chapel and cave. location NX1431.

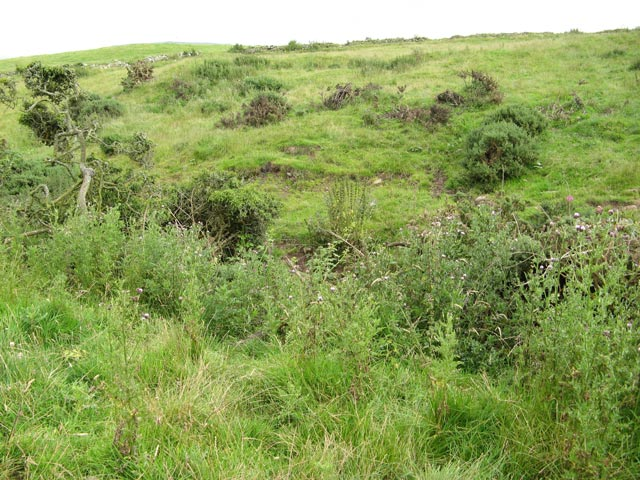
The "old" Kirkmaiden Church site. location NX1332.

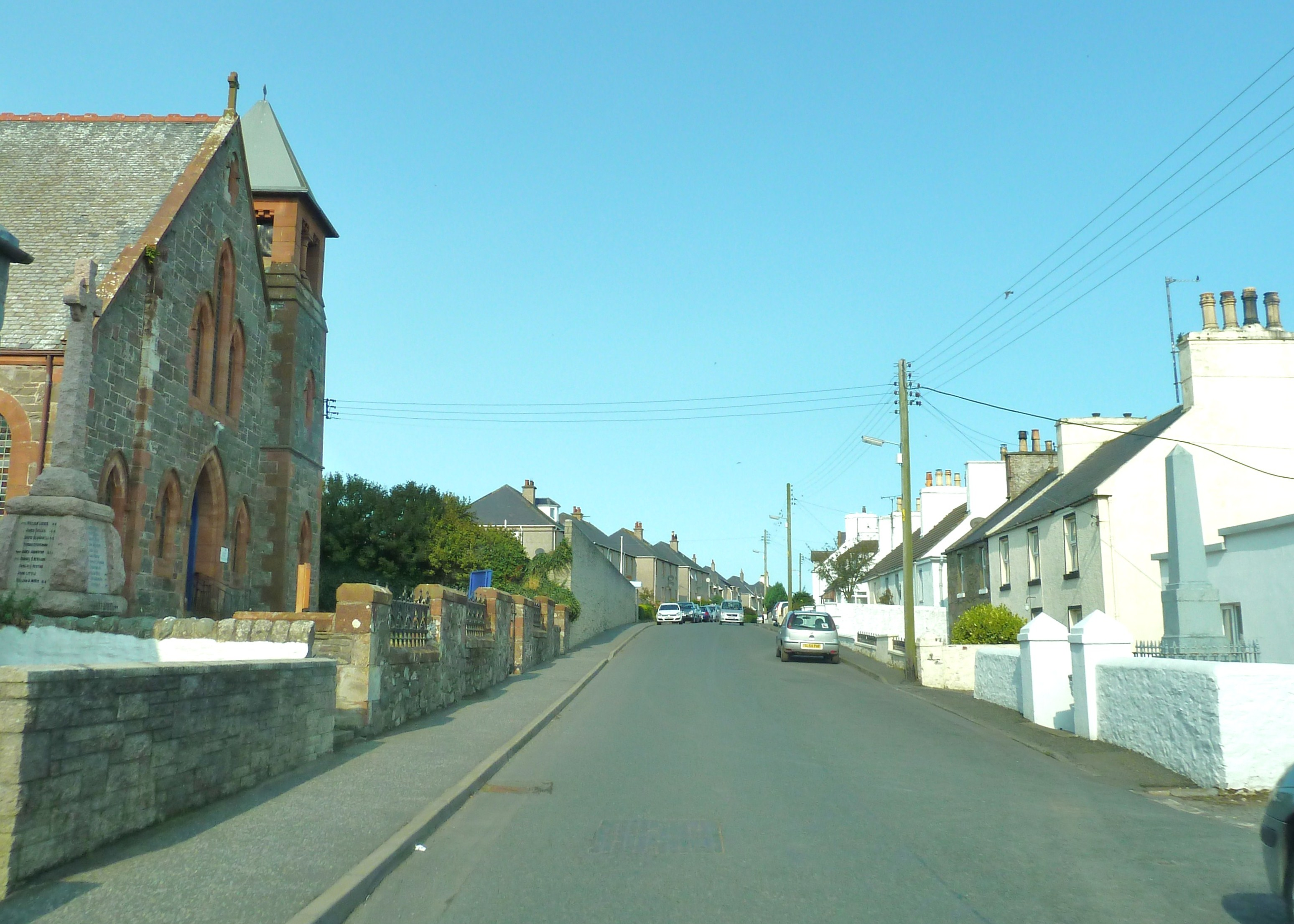
The "newest" Kirkmaiden Parish Church, St. Medan's Church, Stair St, Drummore.

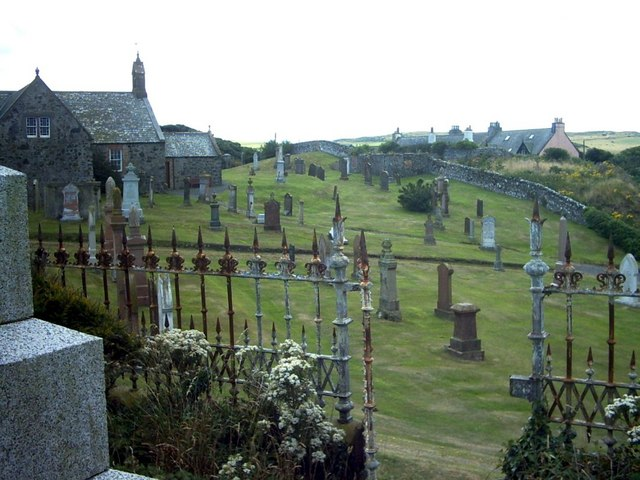
Kirkmaiden church built AD1638 with Core Hill Iron-Age fort in background.

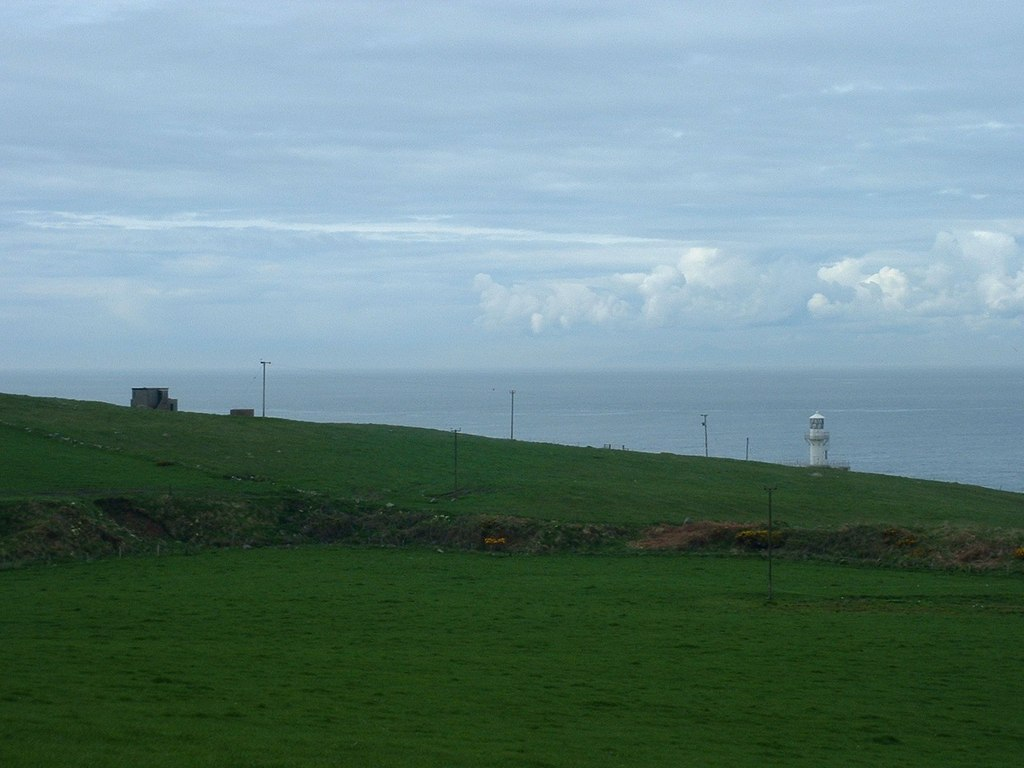
Crammag Head Fort site.

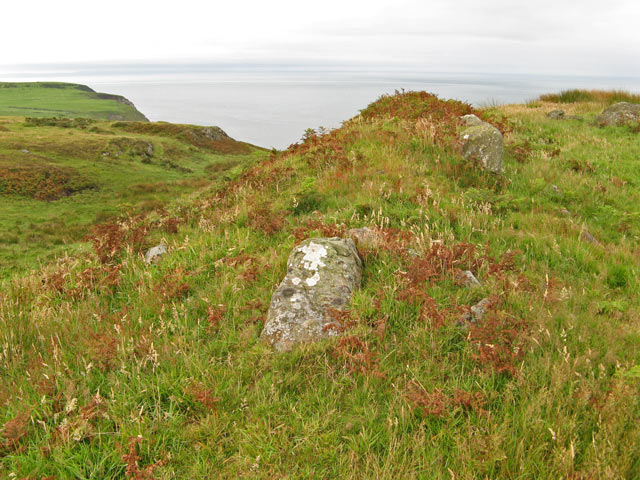
Dunman Fort site.

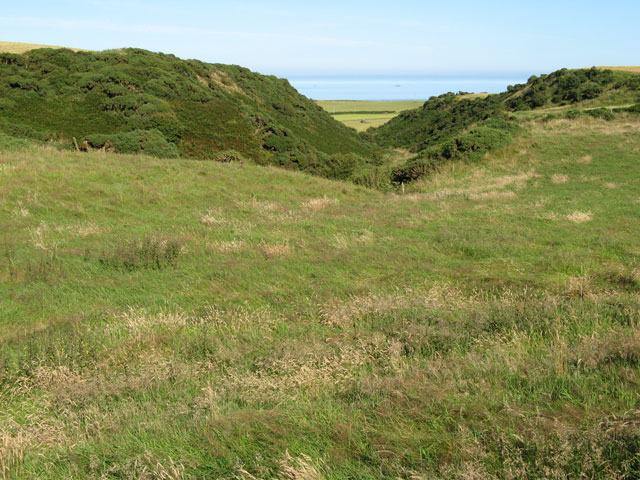
Kildonan Glen near High Drummore Motte and Bailey.

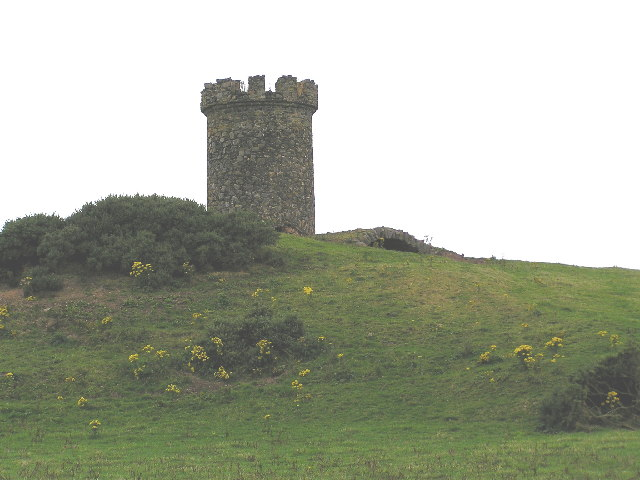
Logan windmill, Kirkmaiden, with vaulted structure at its base.

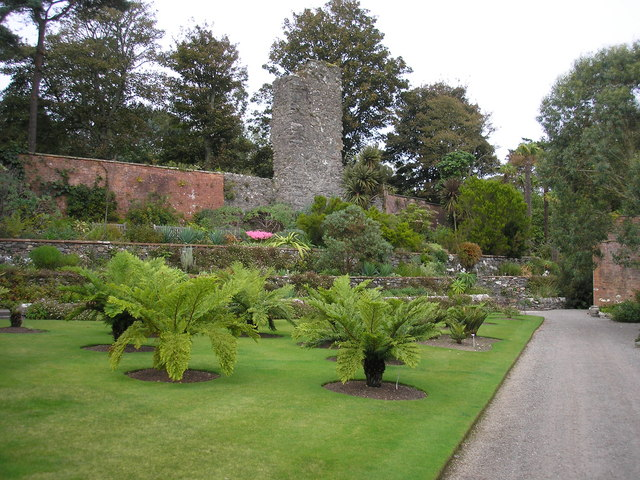
Castle Balzieland ruin in Logan Botanic Gardens.

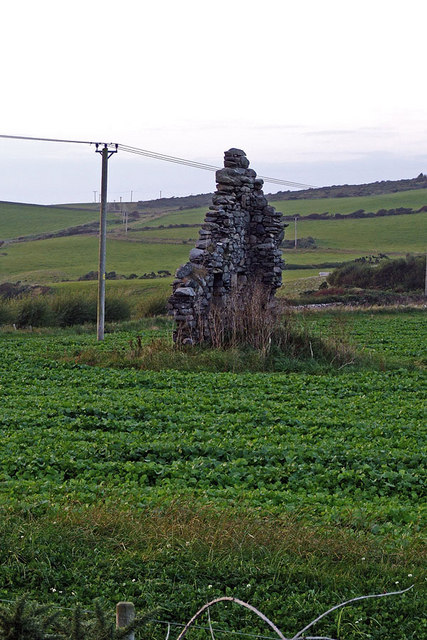
Castle Clanyard ruin.

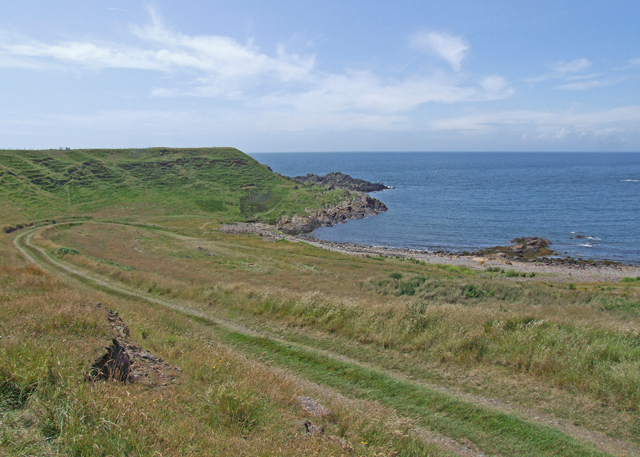
West Tarbet.

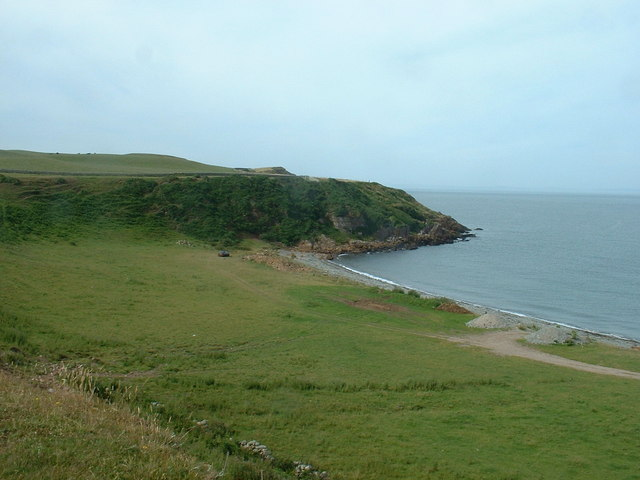
East Tarbet.
