= Kirkmaiden (village) =

Village in Dumfries and Galloway, Scotland

Coordinates: 54.692°N 4.912°W

Kirkmaiden (sometimes Maidenkirk; Scottish Gaelic: Cill M'Eudan) is a small settlement in Galloway, Scotland, located approximately 17 miles (27 km) south of Stranraer. It gives its name to Kirkmaiden parish, which covers the southern end of the Rhinns of Galloway peninsula.

Until Union with England, Scotland's equivalent of the phrase "Land's End to John o' Groats" was often "John o' Groats to Maidenkirk", as Maidenkirk was traditionally considered the southernmost part of that country. It can be found in the song, The Lady of Kenmure:

From John O' Groats to Maidenkirk
You'll never find a truer
For loyal faith and dauntless deeds,
Than the Lady of Kenmure.
