= Saint Medan =

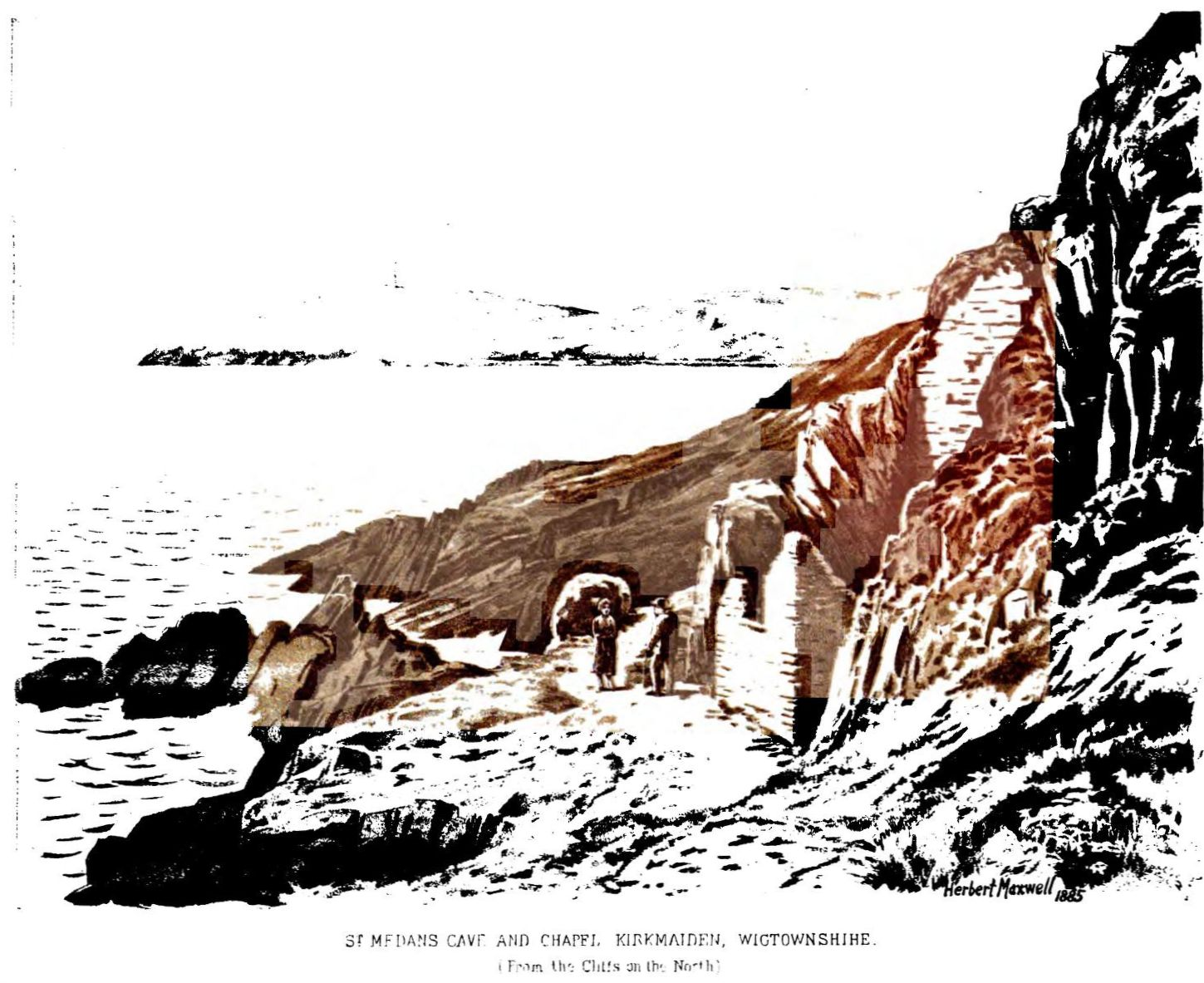
St Medan's Cave and Chapel, Kirkmaiden, Wigtownshire; by Herbert Maxwell, 1885

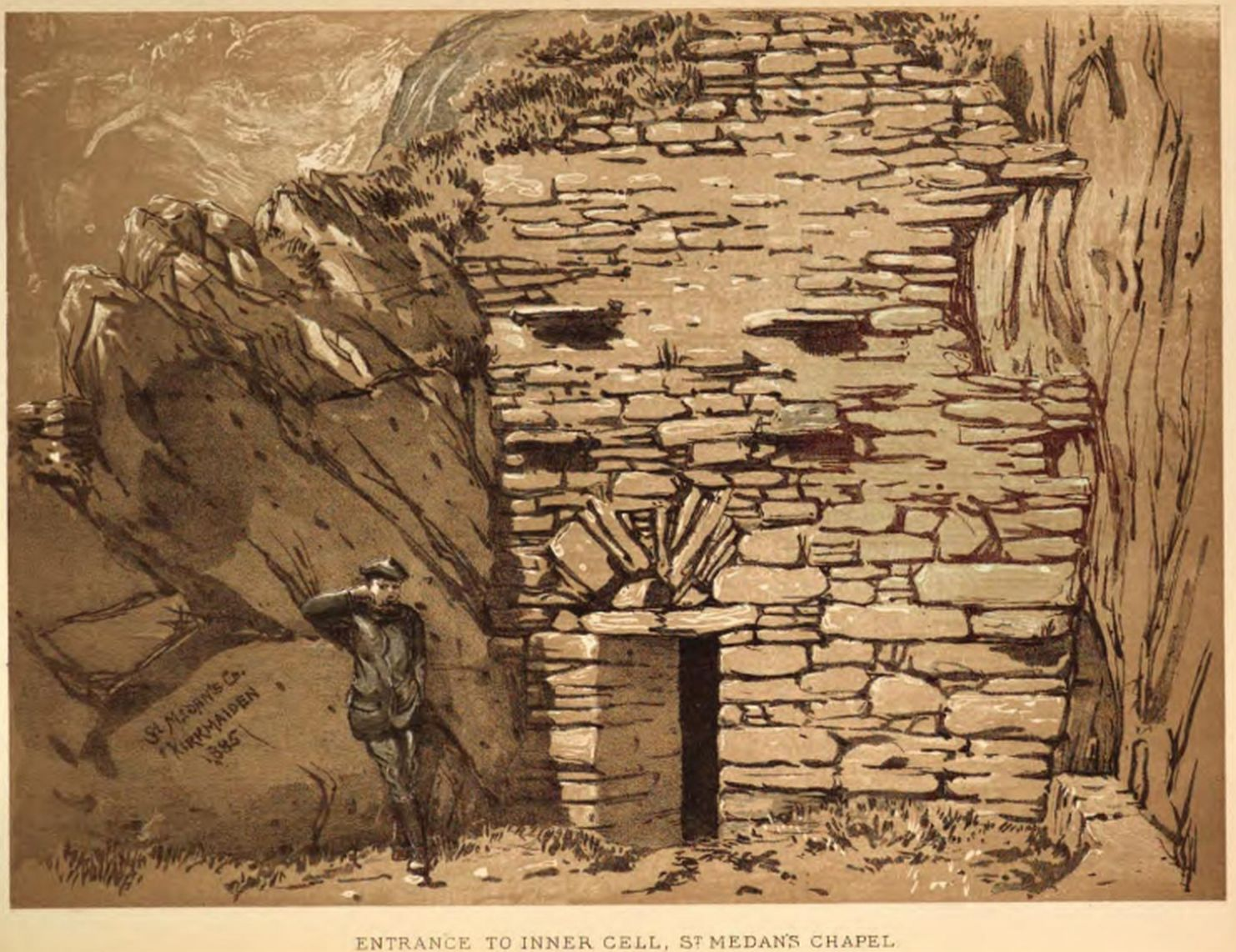
Entrance to Inner Cell, St. Medan's Chapel, Kirkmaiden; by Herbert Maxwell, 1885

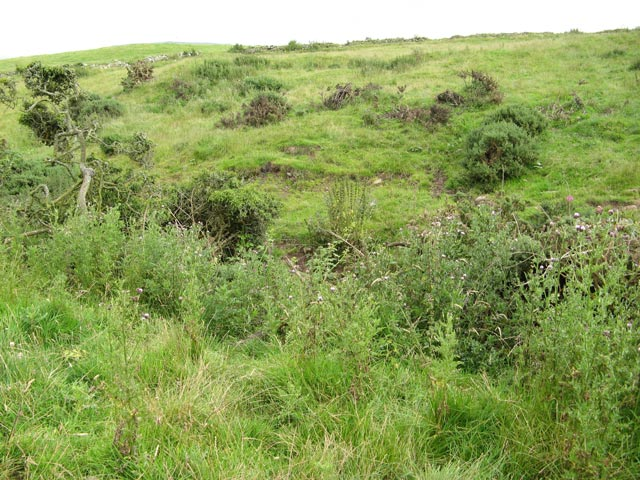
Old Kirkmaiden Church, Mull, Kirkmaiden Parish, Wigtownshire; photo by Jonathan Wilkins

Saint Medan was a saint, apparently of the early British or Irish period, whose existence and name are inferred from the name Kirkmaiden in Wigtownshire, but who is also associated with Angus and Aberdeenshire.

== The occurrence and legend of Medan ==
There is a Kirkmaiden both in the Rinns of Galloway and also on the other side of Luce Bay in the parish of Glasserton near Monreith in the Machars – both in Wigtownshire in Scotland. A legend relates how the saint with her nuns is said to have travelled from the one location to the other across Luce Bay, using a rock as a boat.

== Who was Medan? ==
Medan's identity, name, sex and origin are all disputed.

Some points about the name suggest problems in transmission. First, the name "Medan" sounds similar to the English word "maiden": this may mean that an originally masculine name was interpreted later as a woman's. Second, the name may well begin with the Gaelic element "mo" meaning "my" – an honorific or a diminutive.

The name has been related to several women saints recorded elsewhere. The element "edan" is similar to "Etáin", a name occurring once in the 15th century in Scotland, and argued as the virgin saint of Tumna near Boyle in County Roscommon in the diocese of Elphin – though another authority derives Cill Medoin in the diocese of Tuam not from an apocryphal saint Etáin but prosaically from the Irish for "middle church". Again, the name may be a version of Modwena (Moninne or Darerca), who was abbess of Cill Sléibe Cuilinn in Killevy near Slieve Gullion and died on 5 July 517 or 519; it is said that she founded a number of churches in Scotland. There is a 1901 dedication to a female St Medan in Troon in Ayrshire.

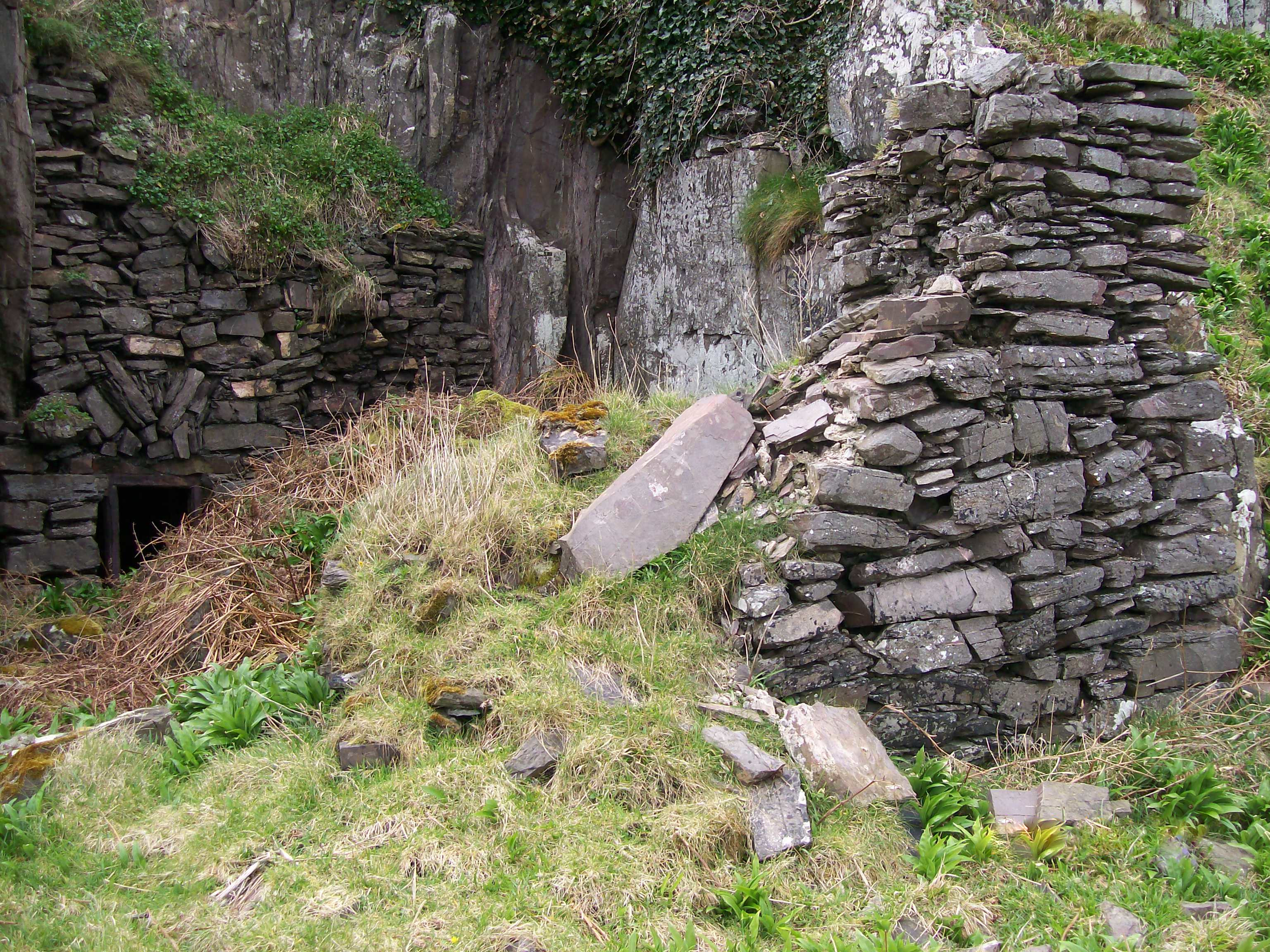
Ruins of St Medan's chapel and cave, Kirkmaiden.

There are other perhaps stronger arguments for the name being that of a man. The name is similar to a man's name, Muadán, which occurs in commemorations on both sides of the Irish Sea, including Glendaruel in Argyll, and has been glossed as a version of "my Aedan": 16 saints bore the name Aedan, including the well-known Aedan of Lindisfarne. Again, a male saint named Medan was buried at Bodmin and perhaps commemorated at Tregavethan, both in Cornwall. A male Modan is the saint of Rosneath, Falkirk, Kirkton of Airlie in Forfar, Fraserburgh and Fintray in Aberdeenshire, and Freswick in Caithness. The church at Kingoldrum in Angus, which was given to Arbroath Abbey in 1211-14 by William the Lion, was dedicated to St Medan; not far from it is a St Medan's Well, and it is thought that originally it was a Celtic establishment. St Medan is also said to have been one of the three companions of St Drostan, the evangeliser of Aberdeenshire and founder of Deer Abbey.

St Medan's Cave, Kirkmaiden is situated at the foot of the degraded cliffline.

== Other information ==
Near the Kirkmaiden at Monreith in the Machars there is a golf course named St Medan's.
