= Sir Alexander Seton, 1st Baronet =

Scottish advocate

Sir Alexander Seton 1st Baronet

Member of the Scottish Parliament for Aberdeenshire
- In office 1685–1686
- In office 1681–1682

Personal details
- Born: c. 1639
- Died: 29 May 1719
- Spouse: Margaret Lauder
- Children: 10

Sir Alexander Seton of Pitmedden, 1st Baronet, Lord Pitmedden (c. 1639 – 29 May 1719) was a Scottish advocate, a Senator of the College of Justice, a Lord of Justiciary, and a Commissioner.

== Early life ==
Seton was the youngest son of John Seton of Pitmedden who commanded a detachment of Royalist troops at the battle of the Bridge of Dee in 1639, and, while riding along the riverside with Lord Aboyne, was shot through the chest by a cannonball, and died at the age of 29.

John Seton's two sons were both infants at the time. With their mother, Elizabeth, daughter of Sir Samuel Johnston, 1st Baronet of Elphinston, they were driven from their house which was plundered, and the whole rents of their estate seized by the Covenanters. Their mother remarried, the Earl of Harfell, and the boys were taken in by their kinsman, George Seton, 4th Earl of Winton, who later enrolled them both at the University of Aberdeen.

James Seton of Pitmedden, the elder brother, became an officer in the English Navy. During the Dutch attack on the English fleet at Chatham in 1667, he was severely wounded and died soon afterwards. He was succeeded by his brother, Alexander.

== Career ==
He became a member of the Faculty of Advocates on 10 December 1661, and was knighted by King Charles II in 1664. He was appointed an Ordinary Lord of Session on 31 October 1677, when he assumed the title of Lord Pitmedden. He was later appointed a Lord of Justiciary, on 5 July 1682. On 15 January 1684, he was created a baronet of Nova Scotia by King Charles II.

He represented Aberdeenshire in the Scottish Parliament in 1681, 1685, and 1686, and for his boldness and independence in opposing the repeal of the Test and Penal Laws proposed by King James VII, he was deprived by that monarch of his seat on The Bench. He was at the same time removed from the Court of Justiciary.

Upon the 1688 Revolution King William III offered to reinstate him as one of the Lords of Session, which Sir Alexander declined feeling it inconsistent with his previous Oaths of Allegiance to James VII. He then retired from professional life.

In his private affairs he succeeded in recovering his family's estates from indebtedness, and possessed a vast library. He published an edition of Sir George Mackenzie's Law of Scotland in matters Criminal, with a treatise on Mutilation and Demembration, annexed.

A painting of Sir Alexander Seton, Lord Pitmedden, hung in the ancient manor house of The Grange, Edinburgh for centuries. It remains in the possession of the Lauder of Fountainhall family.

== Marriage ==
He married, 11 March 1669, a cousin, Margaret (died 19 October 1723), daughter and heiress of William Lauder (died 1695), a Writer (solicitor) and Clerk of the Court of Session, by his spouse Katherine (died 1697), daughter of Thomas Hunter of Hagburne (or Hagbourne), then Berkshire. They had ten children:

- Sir William Seton, 2nd Baronet, of Pitmedden, M.P., for Aberdeenshire (d. 1744)
- Alexander, a military physician who served under the Duke of Marlborough
- James, a merchant in Danzig, died without issue
- Thomas, a physician, died unmarried
- George, of Mounie, Aberdeenshire, an advocate (died 1762)
- Elizabeth, married about 1693 Sir Alexander Wedderburn, 2nd Baronet, of Blackness
- Margaret, married in 1696 Sir John Lauder, 3rd Baronet, of Fountainhall
- Anne (1676–1764), married in 1707 Sir William Leslie Dick of The Grange, Edinburgh
- Jean (died 1768), died unmarried
- Isabel, died unmarried

== Sources ==
- Douglas, Robert, et al., The Baronage of Scotland, Edinburgh, 1798, pp. 184, 272.
- Dalrymple, Sir David, of Hailes, Bt., et al., Senators of the College of Justice of Scotland, Edinburgh, 1849, pp. 406–07.
- Burke, Messrs., John & John Bernard, The Royal Families of England, Scotland, and Wales, with their Descendants, London, 1851, vol. 2, pedigree CLXXIII.
- Anderson, William, The Scottish Nation, Edinburgh, 1867, vol. viii, pg. 440.
- Stewart-Smith, J., The Grange of St Giles, Edinburgh, 1898, pp. 69, 300–03, 409.

Baronetage of Nova Scotia
New creation	Baronet (of Pitmedden); 1683–1719	Succeeded by William Seton
