= Bartholomäus von Stürmer =

Austrian diplomat

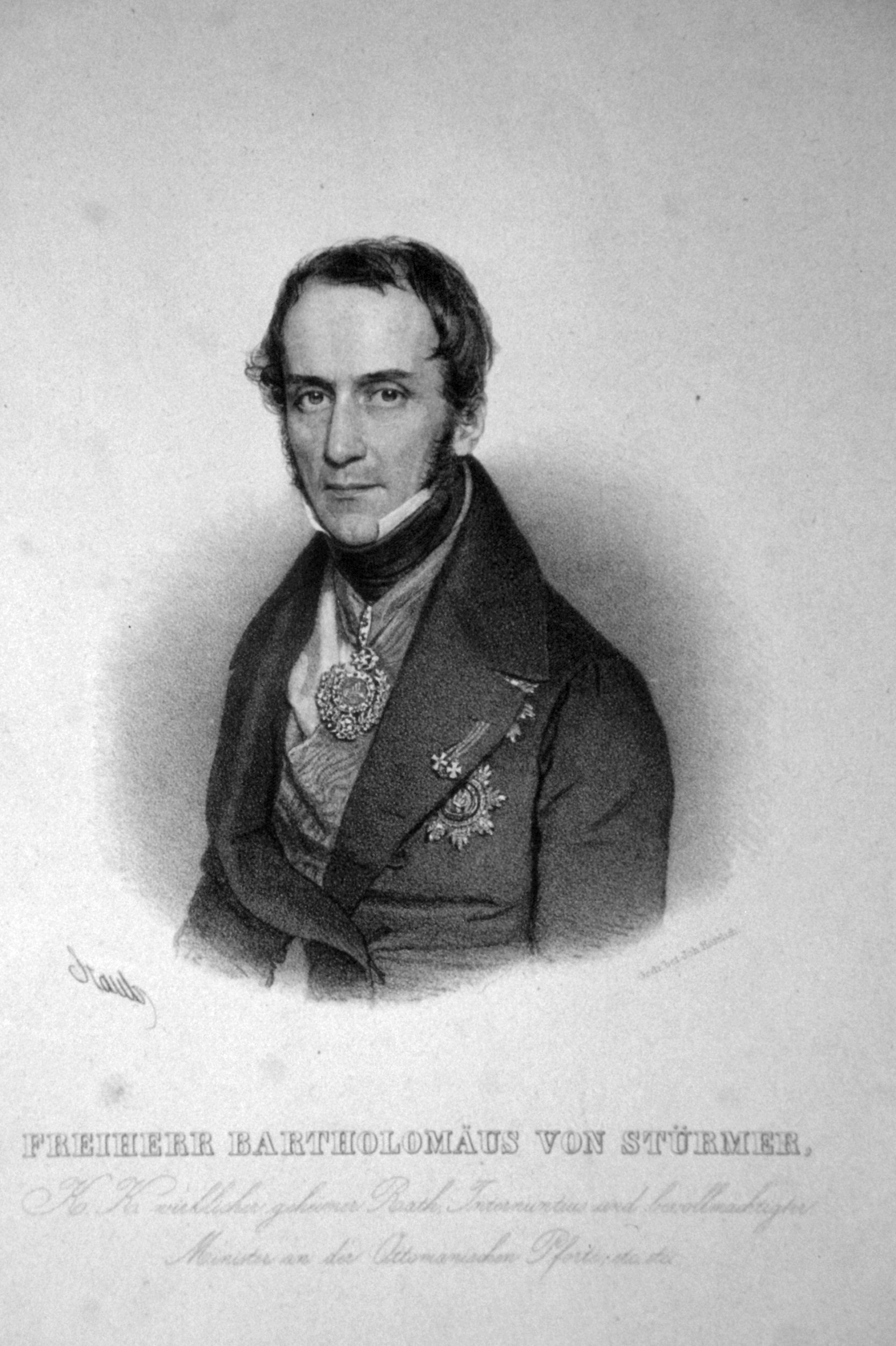
Stürmer before 1839 (lithograph by Andreas Staub)

Bartholomäus Freiherr von Stürmer (26 December 1787 – 8 July 1863) was an Austrian diplomat.

Born in the Pera district of Constantinople, Bartholomäus was the son of Ignatz Lorenz Freiherr von Stürmer, an Austrian diplomat in the Ottoman Empire, and the Baroness Elisabeth of Testa. In order to ensure a quality education, he was registered with the Akademie für Orientalische Sprachen (Academy of Eastern Languages) in Vienna in 1796. He rejoined his father in Constantinople in 1806. He was soon sent to the embassy in Saint Petersburg where he was made secretary of the legation in 1811. There he met Karl Philipp zu Schwarzenberg, whom he followed on trips to over 8000 places, including the important Congress of Châtillon (5 February–19 March 1814). In the spring of 1814 he met his future wife, a Frenchwoman, Ermance de Boutet.

The convention of 2 August 1815, which confirmed that Napoleon Bonaparte was a British prisoner, stipulated that Austria had a right to send a representative to wherever the British decided to imprison the deposed emperor. The British chose the island of Saint Helena. Stürmer requested to be the Austrian official on the island and the emperor accepted. He arrived on Saint Helena on 17 June 1816 with his young wife on board HMS Orontes. His arrival was not appreciated by the British, and he soon saw the impossibility of fulfilling his mission, which was to ensure with his own eyes the presence of Bonaparte on the island, to denounce any attempt to escape and to write every month a report in agreement with the Prussian and Russian representatives. (From British records, a day-by-day record of Stürmer and his wife's lives on the island could be constructed.) In his letters, Stürmer returns on several occasions to the "uselessness" of his mission. During the two years he was on the island, he could never directly see Bonaparte. Although Bonparte's entourage frequently sought him out, Stürmer was under orders to avoid contact.

Stürmer finally was eventually recalled and named ambassador plenipotentiary to the United States in Philadelphia. Before taking up his station, he obtained for his wife, "after two years and half of exile, of dislikes and sacrifices", the right to see her parents in France. After his American mission, he was sent to Rio de Janeiro. He then returned to Austria and remained without an assignment until 1832, when he was appointed ambassador to the Ottoman Empire, on account of his knowledge of the Turkish language. His eminent service got its reward in 1842, when he received the title of count.

In 1850, Stürmer left Constantinople, retired to Italy and died in Venice in 1863.
