= Andreas Staub =

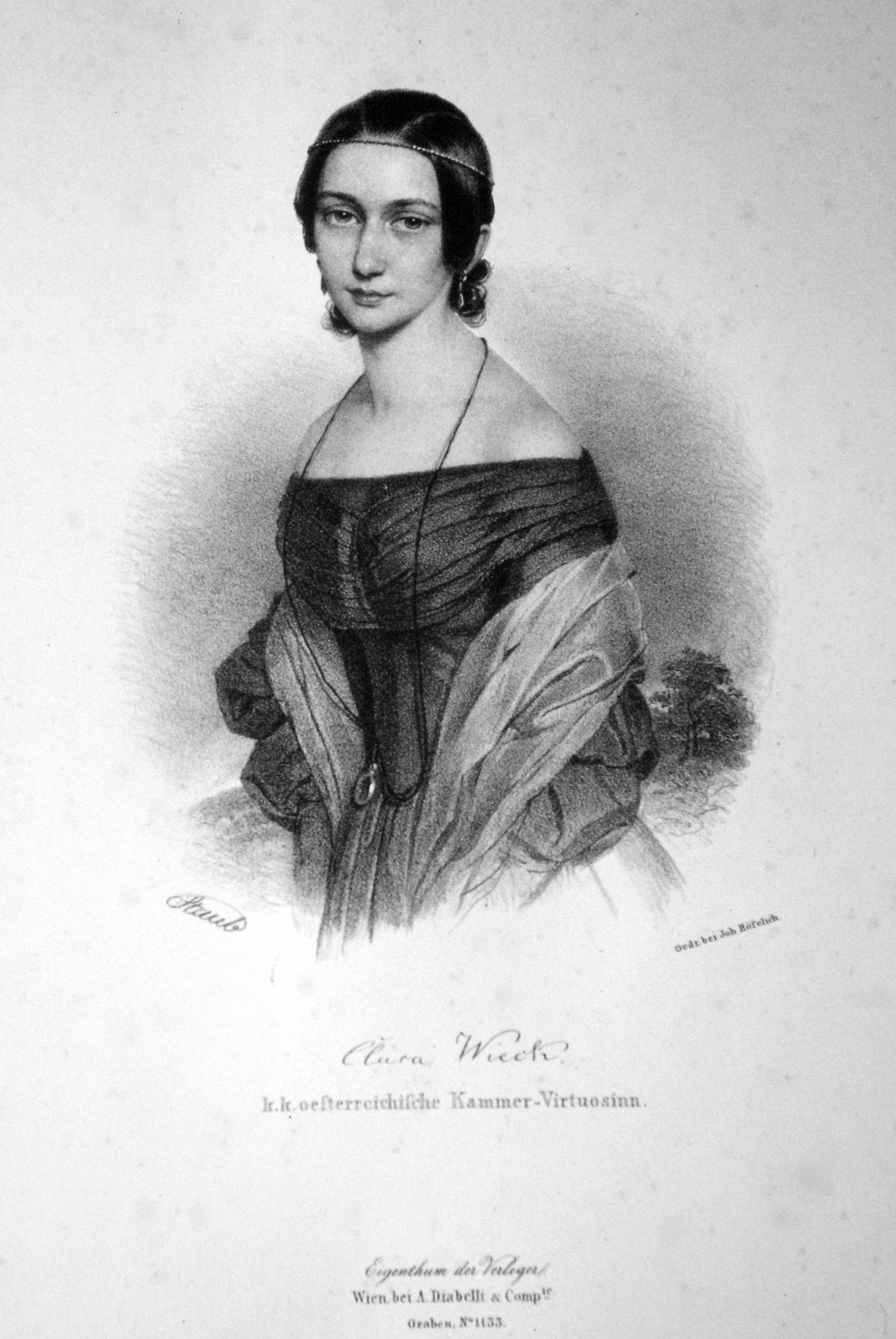
Staub's lithograph of Clara Schumann (above) and its appearance on the 100 Deutschmark note (below)

Andreas Staub (17 October 1806 – 5 April 1839) was an Austrian watercolour painter and lithographer.

Staub was born in Markirch in Alsace and committed suicide in Vienna at the age of 32. Of his life, little is known. He entered the Vienna Academy of Fine Arts at the age of 19 and shortly thereafter was exhibiting his watercolours. Around 1835, he produced a series of lithographs of famous personalities, such as the pianist Sigismund Thalberg, the actress Johanna Franul von Weißenthurn, the diplomat Bartholomäus von Stürmer, the poet Nikolaus Lenau, and the hydrotherapist Vincenz Prießnitz. His most famous such portrait was that of composer Clara Schumann (née Wieck), which appeared on the 100 Deutschmark note between 1990 and 2001.

== Sources ==
- Thieme, Ulrich; Becker, Felix, eds. (1937). "Andreas Staub". Allgemeines Lexikon der Bildenden Künstler von der Antike bis zur Gegenwart. Vol. 31. Leipzig: E. A. Seemann. pp. 492f.
- Wurzbach, Constant von, ed. (1878). "Staub, Andreas". Biographisches Lexikon des Kaiserthums Oesterreich. Vol. 37. Vienna.
