= Lord Claud Hamilton (1787–1808) =

British nobleman and politician (1787–1808)

Lord Claud Hamilton (1 November 1787 – June 1808) was a British nobleman and politician. He sat briefly in the House of Commons before dying of illness in Madeira at the age of 20.

The younger son of John Hamilton, 1st Marquess of Abercorn, he was evidently educated at Harrow School, where he was a lieutenant of volunteers in 1803. He matriculated at Christ Church, Oxford on 24 October 1805, but left there for Cambridge, where he was admitted as a nobleman to St John's College on 19 October 1807. In the meantime, he was elected as Member of Parliament for Dungannon at the general election in May 1807, though underage, through the patronage of his father's political ally, Thomas Knox, 1st Viscount Northland. It was intended that he should later contest County Donegal or County Tyrone, but he suffered from illness, and may not ever have taken his seat. In January 1808, he sailed for Brazil in the brig Eclipse to recover his health, but died in Madeira in June.

Parliament of the United Kingdom
Preceded by Viscount Hamilton	Member of Parliament for Dungannon; 1807–1808	Succeeded by Claude Scott
