= George Hamilton-Gordon, 4th Earl of Aberdeen =

Prime Minister of the United Kingdom from 1852 to 1855

The Right Honourable The Earl of Aberdeen KG KT PC FRS FRSE FSA Scot
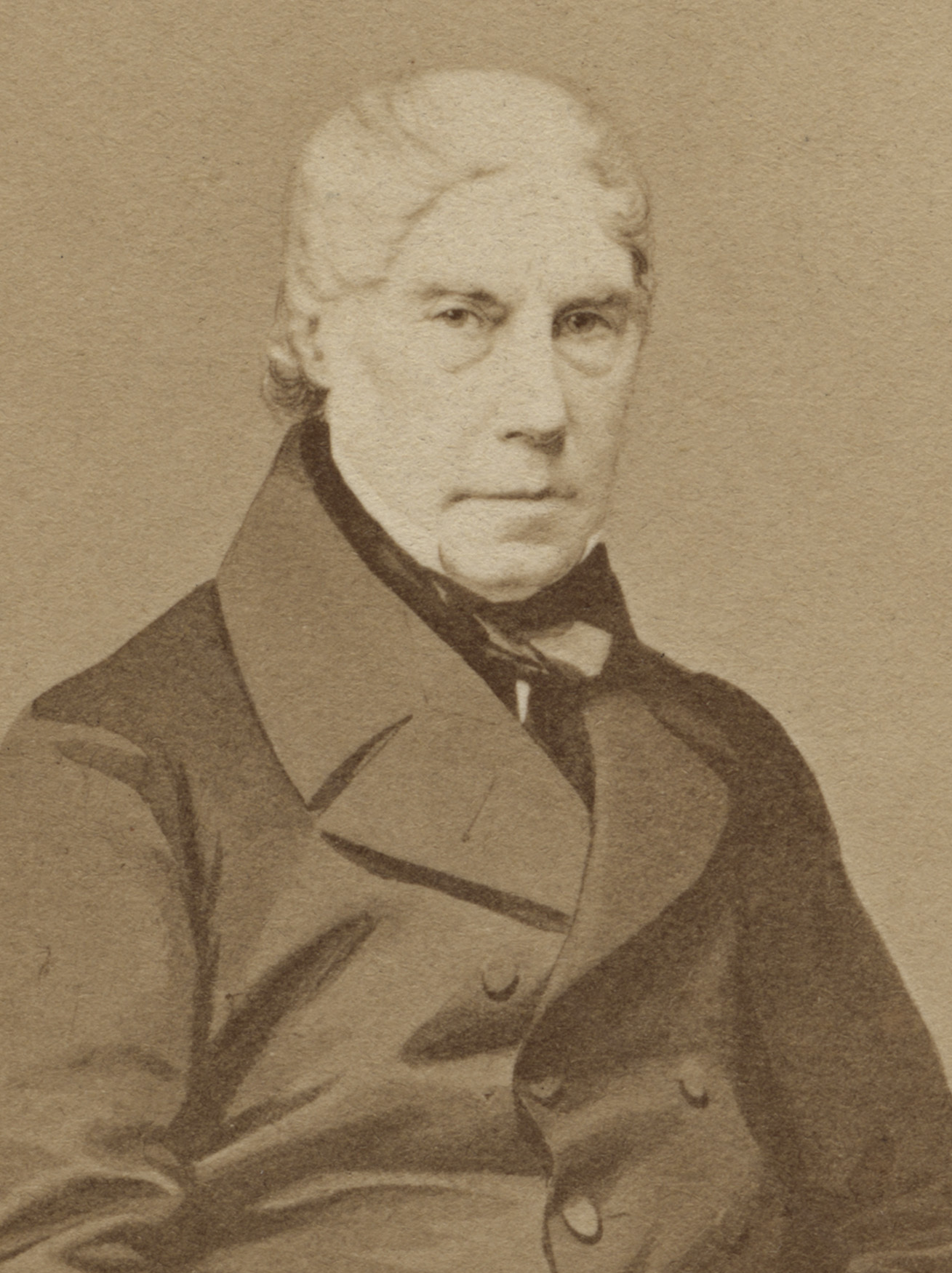
- Lord Aberdeen in July 1860

Prime Minister of the United Kingdom
- In office 19 December 1852 – 30 January 1855
- Monarch: Victoria
- Preceded by: The Earl of Derby
- Succeeded by: The Viscount Palmerston

Foreign Secretary
- In office 2 September 1841 – 6 July 1846
- Prime Minister: Sir Robert Peel
- Preceded by: The Viscount Palmerston
- Succeeded by: The Viscount Palmerston
- In office 2 June 1828 – 22 November 1830
- Prime Minister: The Duke of Wellington
- Preceded by: The Earl of Dudley
- Succeeded by: The Viscount Palmerston

Secretary of State for War and the Colonies
- In office 20 December 1834 – 8 April 1835
- Prime Minister: Sir Robert Peel
- Preceded by: Thomas Spring Rice
- Succeeded by: The Lord Glenelg

Chancellor of the Duchy of Lancaster
- In office 26 January 1828 – 2 June 1828
- Prime Minister: The Duke of Wellington
- Preceded by: The Lord Bexley
- Succeeded by: Charles Arbuthnot

Personal details
- Born: George Gordon; 28 January 1784 Edinburgh, Midlothian, Scotland, Great Britain
- Died: 14 December 1860 (aged 76) St James's, Middlesex, England, United Kingdom
- Resting place: St John the Evangelist, Great Stanmore
- Party: Peelite (1846–1859)
- Other political affiliations: Liberal (1859–1860); Conservative (1834–1846); Tory (before 1834)
- Spouses: Lady Catherine Hamilton (m. 1805; died 1812); Harriet Douglas (m. 1815; died 1833)
- Children: 9, including George, Alexander, and Arthur
- Parent(s): George Gordon, Lord Haddo; Charlotte Baird
- Education: St John's College, Cambridge

George Hamilton-Gordon, 4th Earl of Aberdeen (28 January 1784 – 14 December 1860), styled Lord Haddo from 1791 to 1801, was a British statesman, diplomat and landowner, successively a Tory, Conservative and Peelite politician and specialist in foreign affairs. He served as Prime Minister from 1852 until 1855 in a coalition between the Whigs and Peelites, with Radical and Irish support. The Aberdeen ministry was filled with powerful and talented politicians, whom Aberdeen was largely unable to control and direct. Despite his efforts to avoid this happening, his ministry took Britain into the Crimean War, and fell when the war's conduct became unpopular. Subsequently, Aberdeen retired from politics.

Born into a wealthy family with the largest estates in Scotland, his personal life was marked by the loss of both parents by the time he was eleven, and of his first wife after only seven years of a happy marriage. His daughters died young, and his relations with his sons were difficult. He travelled extensively in Europe, including Greece, and he had a serious interest in the classical civilisations and their archaeology. Aberdeen inherited and subsequently modernized his father's Scottish estates.

After 1812 he became a diplomat, and in 1813, at age 29, was given the critically important embassy to Vienna, where he organised and financed the sixth coalition that defeated Napoleon. His rise in politics was equally rapid and lucky, and "two accidents — Canning's death and Wellington's impulsive acceptance of the Canningite resignations" led to his becoming Foreign Secretary for Prime Minister Wellington in 1828 despite "an almost ludicrous lack of official experience"; he had been a minister for less than six months. After holding the position for two years, followed by another cabinet role, by 1841 his experience led to his appointment as Foreign Secretary again under Robert Peel for a longer term. His diplomatic successes include organizing the coalition against Napoleon in 1812–1814, normalizing relations with post-Napoleonic France, settling the Oregon Boundary Dispute between British North America and the United States, and ending the First Opium War with China in 1842, whereby Hong Kong was obtained. Aberdeen was a poor speaker, but this scarcely mattered in the House of Lords. He exhibited a "dour, awkward, occasionally sarcastic exterior". His friend William Ewart Gladstone, said of him that he was "the man in public life of all others whom I have loved. I say emphatically loved. I have loved others, but never like him".

== Early life ==
Born in Edinburgh on 28 January 1784, he was the eldest son of George Gordon, Lord Haddo, son of George Gordon, 3rd Earl of Aberdeen. His mother was Charlotte, youngest daughter of William Baird of Newbyth. He lost his father on 18 October 1791 and his mother in 1795, and he was brought up by Henry Dundas, 1st Viscount Melville, and William Pitt the Younger. He was educated at Harrow, and St John's College, Cambridge, where he graduated with a Master of Arts in 1804. Before this, however, he had become Earl of Aberdeen on his grandfather's death in 1801, and had travelled all over Europe. On his return to Britain, he founded the Society of Athenian Travellers. In 1805, he married Lady Catherine Elizabeth, daughter of John Hamilton, 1st Marquess of Abercorn.

== Political and diplomatic career, 1805–1828 ==
In December 1805, Lord Aberdeen took his seat as a Tory Scottish representative peer in the House of Lords. In 1808, he was created a Knight of the Thistle. Following the death of his wife from tuberculosis in 1812 he joined the Foreign Service. He was appointed Ambassador Extraordinary and Minister Plenipotentiary to Austria, and signed the Treaty of Töplitz between Britain and Austria in Vienna in October 1813. In the company of the Austrian Emperor, Francis II, he was an observer at the decisive Coalition victory of the Battle of Leipzig in October 1813; he had met Napoleon in his earlier travels. He became one of the central diplomatic figures in European diplomacy at this time, and he was one of the British representatives at the Congress of Châtillon in February 1814, and at the negotiations which led to the Treaty of Paris in May of that year.

Aberdeen was greatly affected by the aftermath of war which he witnessed at first hand. He wrote home:

The near approach of war and its effects are horrible beyond what you can conceive. The whole road from Prague to [Teplitz] was covered with waggons full of wounded, dead, and dying. The shock and disgust and pity produced by such scenes are beyond what I could have supposed possible...the scenes of distress and misery have sunk deeper in my mind. I have been quite haunted by them.

Returning home he was created a peer of the United Kingdom as Viscount Gordon, of Aberdeen in the County of Aberdeen (1814), and made a member of the Privy Council.

In July 1815, he married his former sister-in-law Harriet, daughter of John Douglas, and widow of James Hamilton, Viscount Hamilton; the marriage was much less happy than his first. During the ensuing thirteen years Aberdeen took a less prominent part in public affairs.

== Political career, 1828–1852 ==
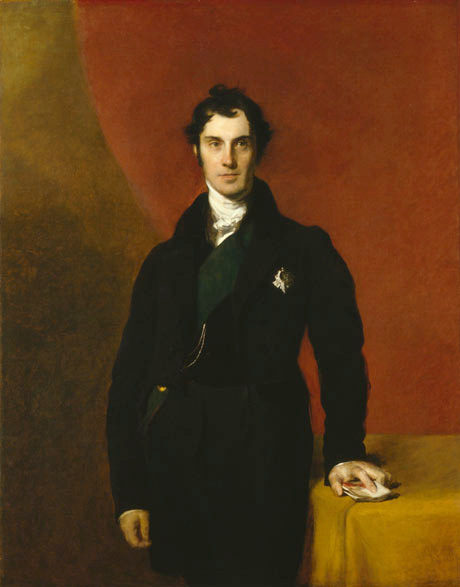
Portrait of Lord Aberdeen by Thomas Lawrence, 1830

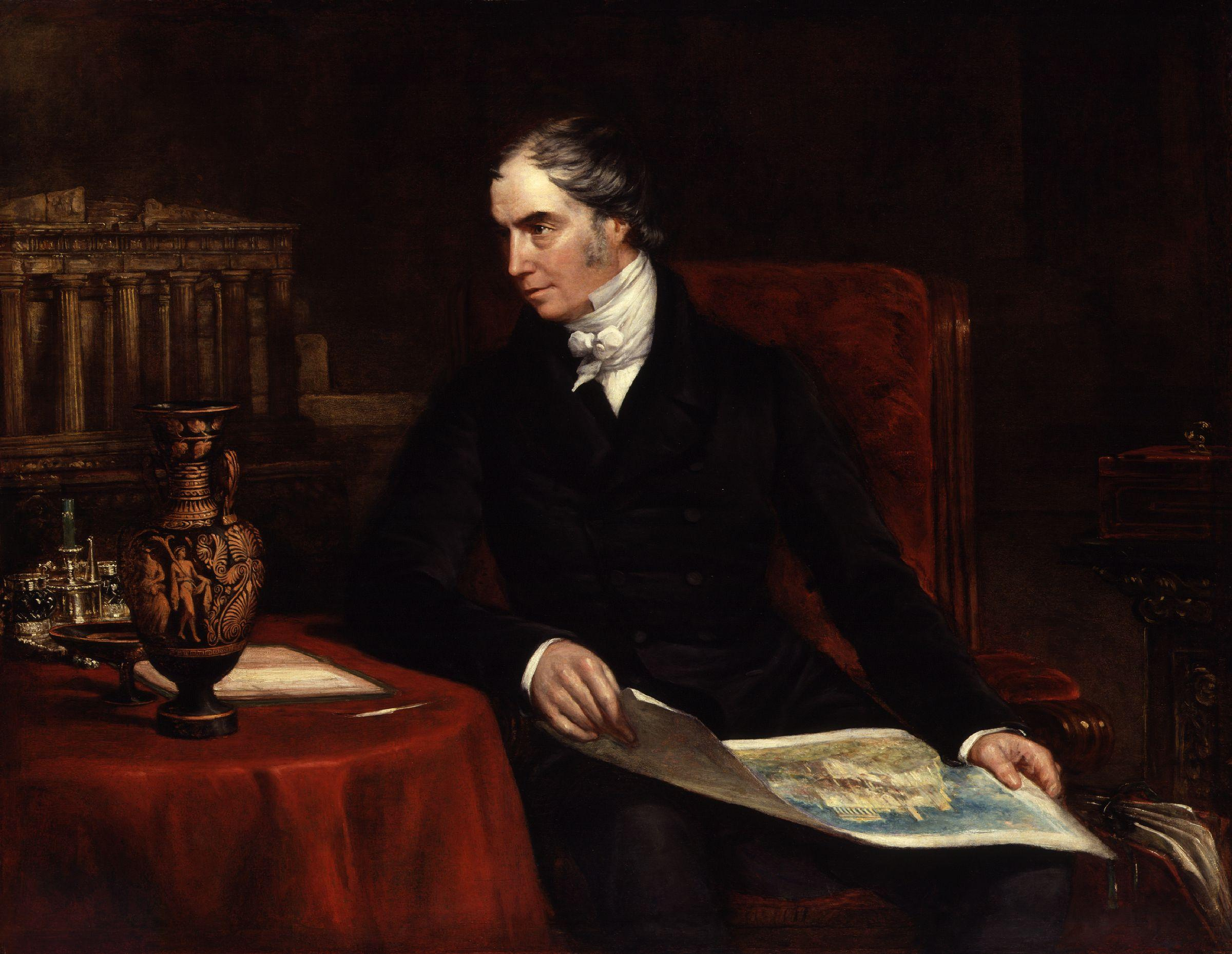
Lord Aberdeen c. 1847 by John Partridge

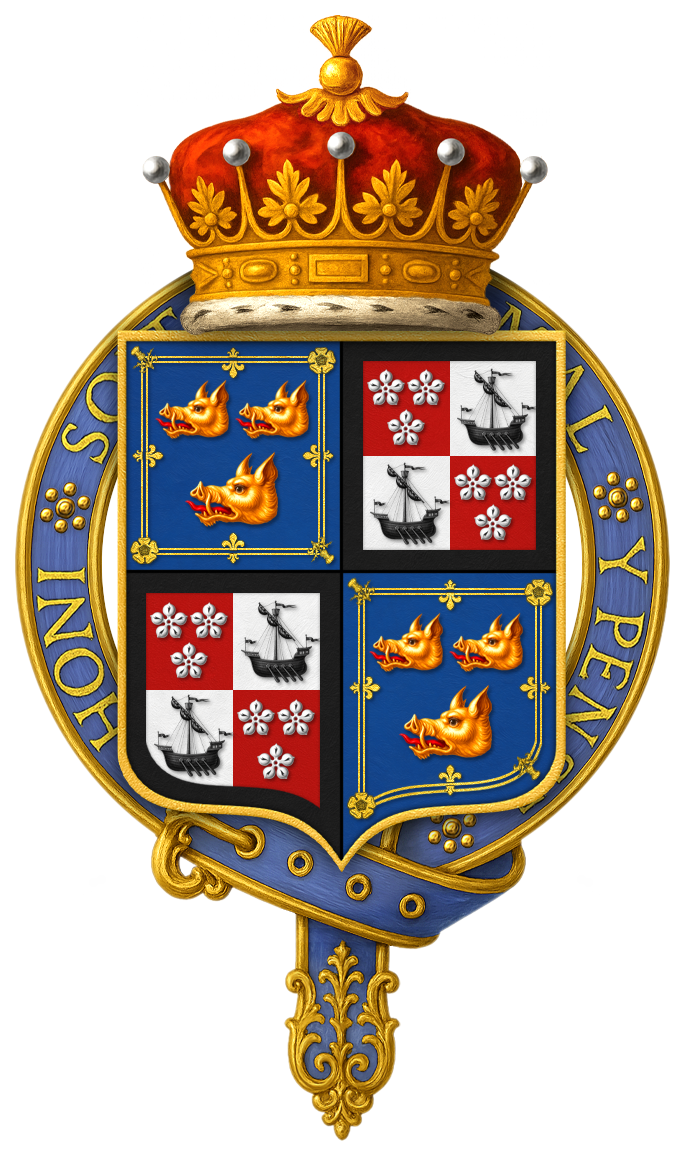
Quartered arms of George Hamilton-Gordon, 4th Earl of Aberdeen, KG, KT, FRSE, FRS, PC

Lord Aberdeen served as Chancellor of the Duchy of Lancaster between January and June 1828 and subsequently as Foreign Secretary until 1830 under the Duke of Wellington. He resigned with Wellington over the Reform Bill of 1832.

He was Secretary of State for War and the Colonies in the first Peel ministry (December 1834 - April 1835), and again Foreign Secretary between 1841 and 1846 under Sir Robert Peel (second Peel ministry). It was during his second stint as Foreign Secretary that he had the harbor settlement of 'Little Hong Kong', on the south side of Hong Kong Island, named after him. It was probably the most productive period of his career; he settled two disagreements with the US: the northeast boundary dispute by the Webster-Ashburton Treaty (1842), and the Oregon dispute by the Oregon Treaty of 1846. He enjoyed the trust of Queen Victoria, which was still important for a Foreign Secretary. He worked closely with Henry Bulwer, his ambassador to Madrid, to help arrange marriages for Queen Isabella and her younger sister the Infanta Luisa Fernanda. They helped stabilize Spain's internal and external relations. He sought better relations with France, relying on his friendship with Guizot, but Britain was aggrieved by a series of issues, especially French colonial policies, the right to search slave ships, the French desire to control Belgium, disputes in the Pacific and the French intervention in Morocco.

=== In opposition ===
Aberdeen again followed his leader and resigned with Peel over the issue of the Corn Laws. After Peel's death in July 1850 he became the recognised leader of the Peelites. In August 1847, a general election of Parliament had been held which resulted in the election of 325 Tory/Conservative party members to Parliament. This represented 42.7% of the seats in Parliament. The main opposition to the Tory/Conservative Party was the Whig Party, which had 292 seats.

While the Peelites agreed with the Whigs on issues dealing with international trade, there were other issues on which the Peelites disagreed with the Whigs. Indeed, Lord Aberdeen's own dislike of the Ecclesiastical Titles Assumption Bill, the rejection of which he failed to secure in 1851, prevented him from joining the Whig government of Lord John Russell in that year. Additionally, 113 of the members of Parliament elected in 1847 were Free Traders. These members agreed with the Peelites on the repeal of the "Corn Laws", but they felt that the tariffs on all consumer products should be removed.

Furthermore, 36 members of Parliament elected in 1847 were members of the "Irish Brigade", who voted with the Peelites and the Whigs for the repeal of the Corn Laws because they sought an end the Great Irish Famine by means of cheaper wheat and bread prices for the poor and middle classes in Ireland. Currently, however, the Free Traders and the Irish Brigade had disagreements with the Whigs that prevented them from joining with the Whigs to form a government. Accordingly, the Tory/Conservative Party leader the Earl of Derby was asked to form a "minority government". Derby appointed Benjamin Disraeli as the Chancellor of the Exchequer for the minority government. The general election in July 1852 had no clear winner.

When in December 1852 Disraeli submitted his budget to Parliament on behalf of the minority government, the Peelites, the Free Traders, and the Irish Brigade were all alienated by the proposed budget. Accordingly, those groups suddenly forgot their differences with the Whig Party and voted with the Whigs against the proposed budget. The vote was 286 in favour of the budget and 305 votes against the budget. Because the leadership of the minority government had made the vote on the budget vote a vote of confidence, the defeat of the Disraeli budget was a "vote of no confidence" in the minority government and meant its downfall. Lord Aberdeen was asked to form a new government; Gladstone became his Chancellor.

== Prime Minister, 1852–1855 ==
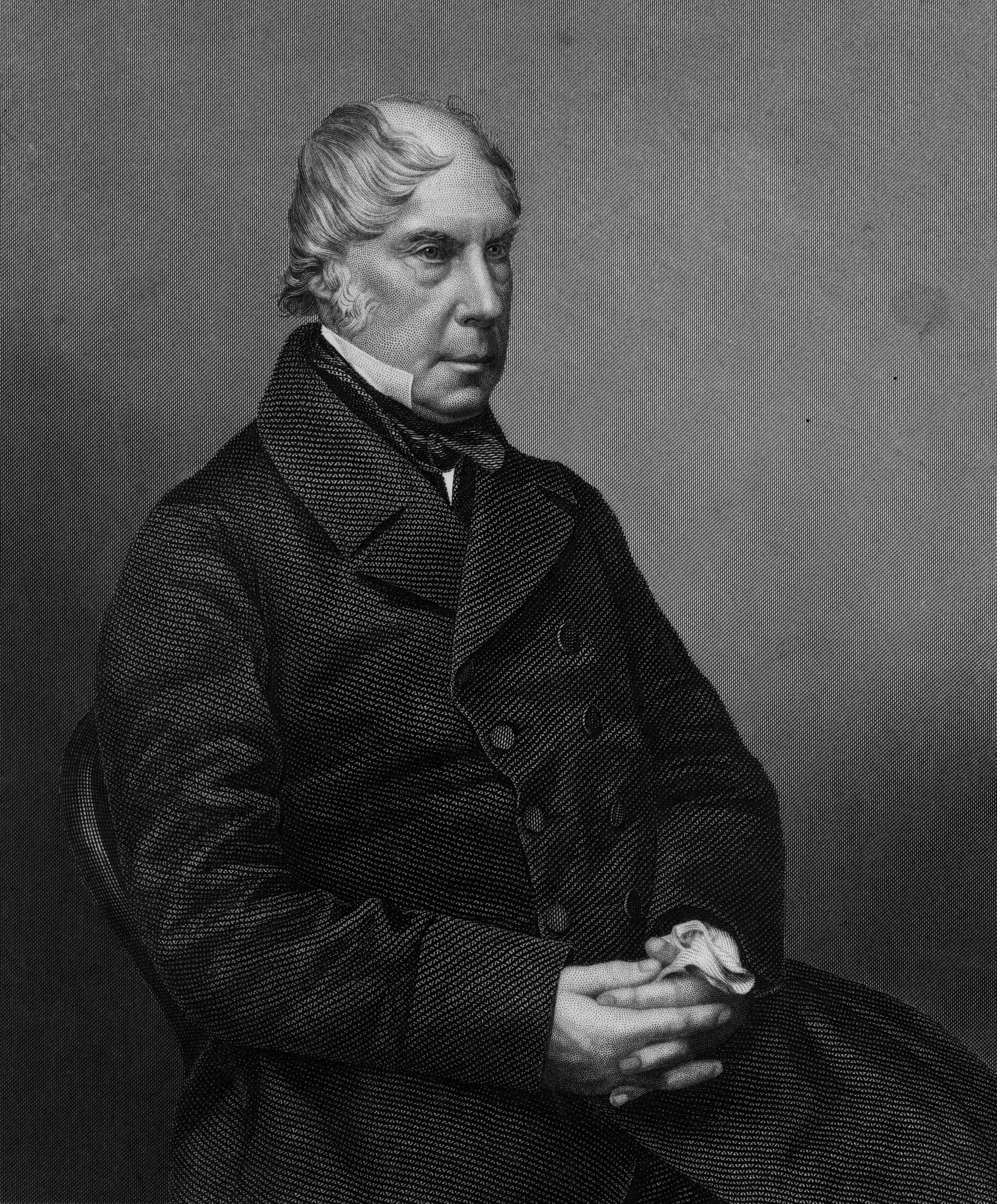
Aberdeen in the 1850s

Following the downfall of the Tory/Conservative minority government under Lord Derby in December 1852, Lord Aberdeen formed a new government from the coalition of Free Traders, Peelites, and Whigs that had voted no confidence in the minority government. Lord Aberdeen was able to put together a coalition that held 53.8% of the seats of Parliament. Thus Lord Aberdeen, a Peelite, became Prime Minister and headed a coalition ministry of Whigs and Peelites.

Although united on international trade issues and on questions of domestic reform, his cabinet also contained Lord Palmerston and Lord John Russell, who were certain to differ on questions of foreign policy. Charles Greville wrote in his Memoirs, "In the present cabinet are five or six first-rate men of equal, or nearly equal, pretensions, none of them likely to acknowledge the superiority or defer to the opinions of any other, and every one of these five or six considering himself abler and more important than their premier"; and Sir James Graham wrote, "It is a powerful team, but it will require good driving", which Aberdeen was unable to provide. During the administration, much trouble was caused by the rivalry between Palmerston and Russell, and over the course of it Palmerston managed to out-manoeuvre Russell to emerge as the Whig heir apparent. The cabinet also included a single Radical, Sir William Molesworth, but much later, when justifying to the Queen his own new appointments, Gladstone told her: "For instance, even in Ld Aberdeen's Govt, in 52, Sir William Molesworth had been selected, at that time, a very advanced Radical, but who was perfectly harmless, & took little, or no part.... He said these people generally became very moderate, when they were in office", which she admitted had been the case.

One of the foreign policy issues on which Palmerston and Russell disagreed was the type of relationship that Britain should have with France and especially France's ruler, Louis-Napoléon Bonaparte. Bonaparte was the nephew of the famous Napoleon Bonaparte, who had become dictator and then Emperor of France from 1804 until 1814. The younger Bonaparte had been elected to a three-year term as President of the Second Republic of France on 20 December 1848. The Constitution of the Second Republic limited the President to a single term in office. Thus, Louis Bonaparte would be unable to succeed himself and after 20 December 1851 would no longer be president. Consequently, on 2 December 1851, shortly before the end of his single three-year term in office was to expire, Bonaparte staged a coup against the Second Republic in France, disbanded the elected Constituent Assembly, arrested some of the Republican leaders, and declared himself Emperor Napoleon III of France. This coup upset many democrats in England as well as in France. Some British government officials felt that Louis Bonaparte was seeking foreign adventure in the spirit of his uncle, Napoleon I. Consequently, these officials felt that any close association with Bonaparte would eventually lead Britain into another series of wars, like the wars with France and Napoleon dating from 1793 until 1815. British relations with France had scarcely improved since 1815. As prime minister, the Earl of Aberdeen was one of these officials who feared France and Bonaparte.

However, other British government officials were beginning to worry more about the rising political dominance of the Russian Empire in eastern Europe and the corresponding decline of the Ottoman Empire. Lord Palmerston at the time of Louis Bonaparte's 2 December 1851 coup was serving as the Secretary of State for Foreign Affairs in the Whig government of Prime Minister Lord John Russell. Without informing the rest of the cabinet or Queen Victoria, Palmerston had sent a private note to the French ambassador endorsing Louis Bonaparte's coup and congratulating Louis Bonaparte himself on the coup. Queen Victoria and members of the Russell government demanded that Palmerston be dismissed as Foreign Minister. Russell requested Palmerston's resignation and Palmerston reluctantly provided it.

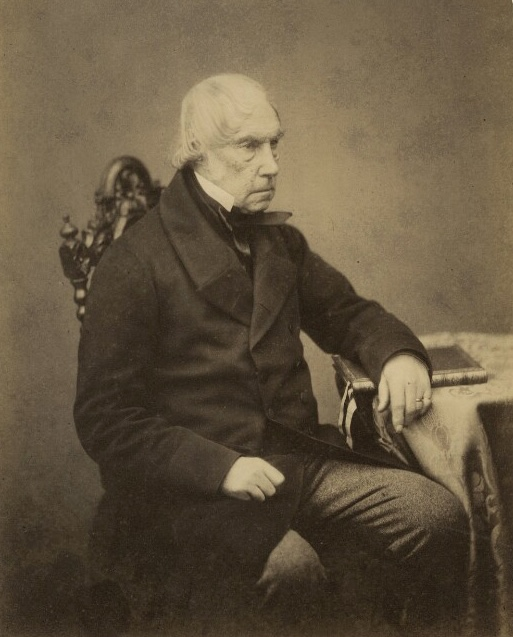
George Hamilton Gordon, 4th Earl of Aberdeen, c. June 1858

In February 1852, Palmerston took revenge on Russell by voting with the Conservatives in a "no confidence" vote against the Russell government. This brought an end to the Russell Whig government and set the stage for a general election in July 1852 which eventually brought the Conservatives to power in a minority government under the Earl of Derby. Later in the year, another problem facing the Earl of Aberdeen in the formation of his own new government in December 1852 was Lord John Russell himself. Russell was the leader of the Whig Party, the largest group in the coalition government. Consequently, Lord Aberdeen, was required to appoint Russell as the Secretary of State for Foreign Affairs, which he had done on 29 December 1852. However, Russell sometimes liked to use this position to speak for the whole government, as if he were the prime minister. In 1832, Russell had been nicknamed "Finality John" because of his statement that the 1832 Reform Act had just been approved by both the House of Commons and the House of Lords would be the "final" expansion of the vote in Britain. There would be no further extension of the ballot to the common people of Britain. However, as political pressure in favour of further reform had risen over the twenty years since 1832, Russell had changed his mind. Russell had said, in January 1852, that he intended to introduce a new reform bill into the House of Commons which would equalise the populations of the districts from which members of Parliament were elected. Probably as a result of their continuing feud, Palmerston declared himself against this Reform Bill of 1852. As a result, support for the bill dwindled and Russell was forced to change his mind again and not introduce any Reform Bill in 1852.

In order to form the coalition government, the Earl of Aberdeen had been required to appoint both Palmerston and Russell to his cabinet. Because of the controversy surrounding Palmerston's removal as Secretary of State for Foreign Affairs, Palmerston could not now be appointed Foreign Minister again so soon after his removal from that position. Accordingly, on 28 December 1852, Aberdeen appointed Palmerston as Home Secretary and appointed Russell as Foreign Minister.

== The "Eastern Question" ==
Given the differences of opinion within the Lord Aberdeen cabinet over the direction of foreign policy with regard to relations between Britain and France under Napoleon III, it is not surprising that debate raged within the government as Louis Bonaparte, now assuming the title of Emperor Napoleon III. As Prime Minister of the Peelite/Whig coalition government, Aberdeen eventually led Britain into war on the side of the French and Ottomans against the Russian Empire. This war would eventually be called the Crimean War, but throughout the foreign policy negotiations surrounding the dismemberment of the Ottoman Empire, which would continue throughout the middle and end of nineteenth century, the problem would be referred to as the "Eastern Question".

The cabinet was bitterly divided. Palmerston stirred up anti-reform feeling in Parliament and pro-war public opinion to out-maneuver Russell. The result was that the weak Aberdeen government went to war with Russia as the result of internal British political rivalries. Aberdeen accepted Russian arguments at face value because he sympathised with Russian interests against French pressure and was not in favour of the Crimean War. However, he was unable to resist the pressure that was being exerted on him by Palmerston's faction. In the end, the Crimean War proved to be the downfall of his government.

The Eastern Question flared up on 2 December 1852, with the Napoleon's coup against the Second Republic. As Napoleon III was forming his new imperial government, he sent an ambassador to the Ottoman Empire with instructions to assert France's right to protect Christian sites in Jerusalem and the Holy Land. The Ottoman Empire agreed to this condition to avoid conflict or even war with France. Aberdeen, as Foreign Secretary in 1845, had himself tacitly authorised the construction of the first Anglican church in Jerusalem, following his predecessor's commission in 1838 of the first European Consul in Jerusalem on Britain's behalf, which lead to series of successive appointments by other nations. Both resulted from Lord Shaftesbury's canvassing with substantial public support.

Nevertheless, Britain became increasingly worried about the situation in Turkey, and Prime Minister Aberdeen sent Lord Stratford de Redcliffe, a diplomat with vast experience in Turkey, as a special envoy to the Ottoman Empire to guard British interests. Russia protested the Turkish agreement with the French as a violation of the Treaty of Küçük Kaynarca of 1778, which ended the Russo-Turkish War (1768–1774). Under the treaty, the Russians had been granted the exclusive right to protect the Christian sites in the Holy Land. Accordingly, on 7 May 1853, the Russians sent Prince Alexander Sergeyevich Menshikov, one their premier statesmen, to negotiate a settlement of the issue. Prince Menshikov called the attention of the Turks to the fact that during the Russo-Turkish War, the Russians had occupied the Turkish-controlled provinces of Wallachia and Moldavia on the north bank of the Danube River, and he reminded them that pursuant to the Treaty of Küçük Kaynarca, the Russians had returned these "Danubian provinces" to Ottoman control in exchange for the right to protect the Christian sites in the Holy Land. Accordingly, the Turks reversed themselves and agreed with the Russians.

The French sent one of their premier ships-of-the-line, the Charlemagne, to the Black Sea as a show of force. In light of the French show of force, the Turks, again, reversed themselves and recognised the French right to protect the Christian sites. Lord Stratford de Redcliffe was advising the Ottomans during this time, and later it was alleged that he had been instrumental in persuading the Turks to reject the Russian arguments.

As war became inevitable, Aberdeen wrote to Russell:

The abstract justice of the cause, although indisputable, is but a poor consolation for the inevitable calamities of all war, or for a decision which I am not without fear may prove to have been impolitic and unwise. My conscience upbraids me the more, because seeing, as I did from the first, all that was to be apprehended, it is possible that by a little more energy and vigour, not on the Danube, but in Downing Street, it might have been prevented.

== Crimean War 1853–1856 ==
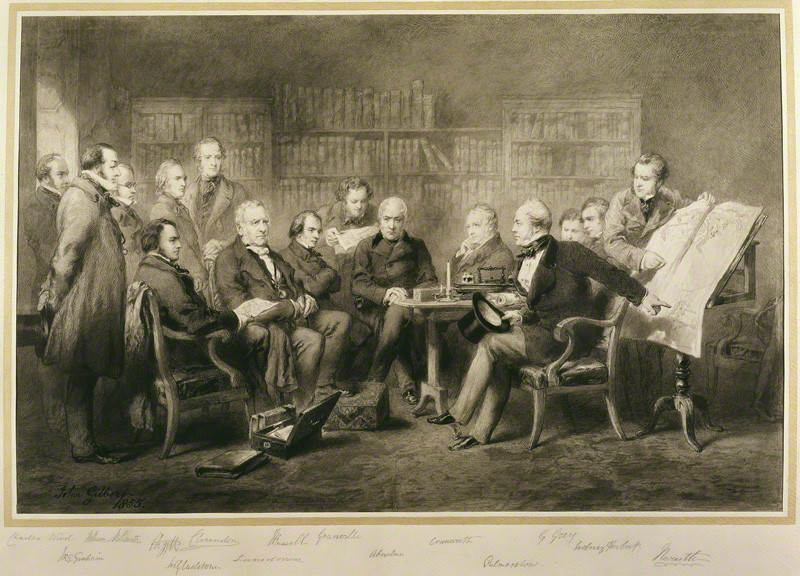
The coalition Aberdeen ministry of 1854 after a painting by Sir John Gilbert, 1855

In response this latest change of mind by the Ottomans, the Russians on 2 July 1853 occupied the Turkish satellite states of Wallachia and Moldavia, as they had during the Russo-Turkish War of 1768–1774. Almost immediately, the Russian troops deployed along the northern banks of the Danube River, implying that they might cross the river. Aberdeen ordered the British Fleet to Constantinople and later into the Black Sea. On 23 October 1853, the Ottoman Empire declared war on Russia. A Russian naval raid on Sinope, on 30 November 1853, resulted in the destruction of the Turkish fleet in the battle of Sinope. When Russia ignored an Anglo-French ultimatum to abandon the Danubian provinces, Britain and France declared war on Russia on 28 March 1854. In September 1854, British and French troops landed on the Crimean peninsula at Eupatoria, north of Sevastopol. The Allied troops then moved across the Alma River on 20 September 1854 at the battle of Alma and set siege to the fort of Sevastopol.

A Russian attack on the allied supply base at Balaclava on 25 October 1854 was rebuffed. The Battle of Balaclava is noted for its famous (or rather infamous) Charge of the Light Brigade. On 5 November 1854, Russian forces tried to relieve the siege at Sevastopol and defeat the Allied armies in the field in the Battle of Inkerman. However, this attempt failed. Dissatisfaction as to the course of the war grew in England. As reports returned detailing the mismanagement of the conflict, Parliament began to investigate. On 29 January 1855, John Arthur Roebuck introduced a motion for the appointment of a select committee to enquire into the conduct of the war. This motion was carried by the large majority of 305 in favour and 148 against.

Treating this as a vote of no confidence in his government, Aberdeen resigned, and retired from active politics, speaking for the last time in the House of Lords in 1858. In visiting Windsor Castle to resign, he told the Queen: "Nothing could have been better, he said than the feeling of the members towards each other. Had it not been for the incessant attempts of Ld John Russell to keep up party differences, it must be acknowledged that the experiment of a coalition had succeeded admirably. We discussed future possibilities & agreed that nothing remained to be done, but to offer the Govt to Ld Derby,...". The Queen continued to criticise Lord John Russell for his behaviour for the rest of his life; on his death in 1878 her journal records that he was "A man of much talent, who leaves a name behind him, kind, & good, with a great knowledge of the constitution, who behaved very well, on many trying occasions; but he was impulsive, very selfish (as shown on many occasions, especially during Ld Aberdeen's administration) vain, & often reckless & imprudent".

== Relations with the United States ==
British-American relations had been troublesome under Palmerston, but Aberdeen proved much more conciliatory, and worked well with Daniel Webster, the American Secretary of State who was himself an Anglophile. In 1842, Aberdeen sent Lord Ashburton to Washington to settle all disputes, especially the border between Canada and Maine, the boundary along the Great Lakes, the Oregon boundary, the African slave trade, the Caroline affair about boundaries in 1837 and the Creole case of 1841 involving a slave revolt on the high seas. The Webster–Ashburton Treaty of 1842 solved most of the problems amicably. Thus Maine got most of the disputed land, but Canada obtained a vital, strategic strip of land connecting it to a warm water port.

Aberdeen helped solve the Oregon Boundary Dispute amicably, under threat of war from President Polk, with a hastily negotiated treaty in 1846. The Treaty ceded the heart of the Hudson's Bay Company's Columbia District as well as Puget Sound, and created the anomaly of Point Roberts; while its vague and ambiguous description of the maritime boundary set the stage for the Pig War over the San Juan Islands.

As Prime Minister, his apeasmentist reputation hindered rather than helped, and Aberdeen continually had diplomatic trouble with the United States. In 1854, an American naval vessel bombarded the mosquito port of Greytown, Nicaragua in retaliation for an insult; Britain protested. Later in 1846, the United States announced its intention of annexing Hawaii, and Britain not only complained but sent a naval force to make the point. Negotiations for reciprocal trade agreement between the United States and Canada dragged on for eight years until a reciprocity treaty was reached in 1854.

== Legacy ==
Aberdeen was generally successful as a hard-working diplomat, but his reputation has suffered greatly because of the lack of military success in the Crimean War and from the ridicule of enemies such as Disraeli who regarded him as weak, inefficient, and cold. Before the Crimean debacle that ended his career, Aberdeen scored numerous diplomatic triumphs, starting in 1813–14 when as ambassador to the Austrian Empire he negotiated the alliances and financing that led to the defeat of Napoleon. In Paris, he normalized relations with the newly restored Bourbon government and convinced London it could be trusted. He worked well with top European diplomats such as his friends Klemens von Metternich in Vienna and François Guizot in Paris. He brought Britain into the center of Continental diplomacy on critical issues, such as the local wars in Greece, Portugal, and Belgium. Simmering troubles on numerous issues with the United States were ended by friendly compromises. He played a central role in winning the Opium Wars against China, gaining control of Hong Kong in the process.

== Family ==
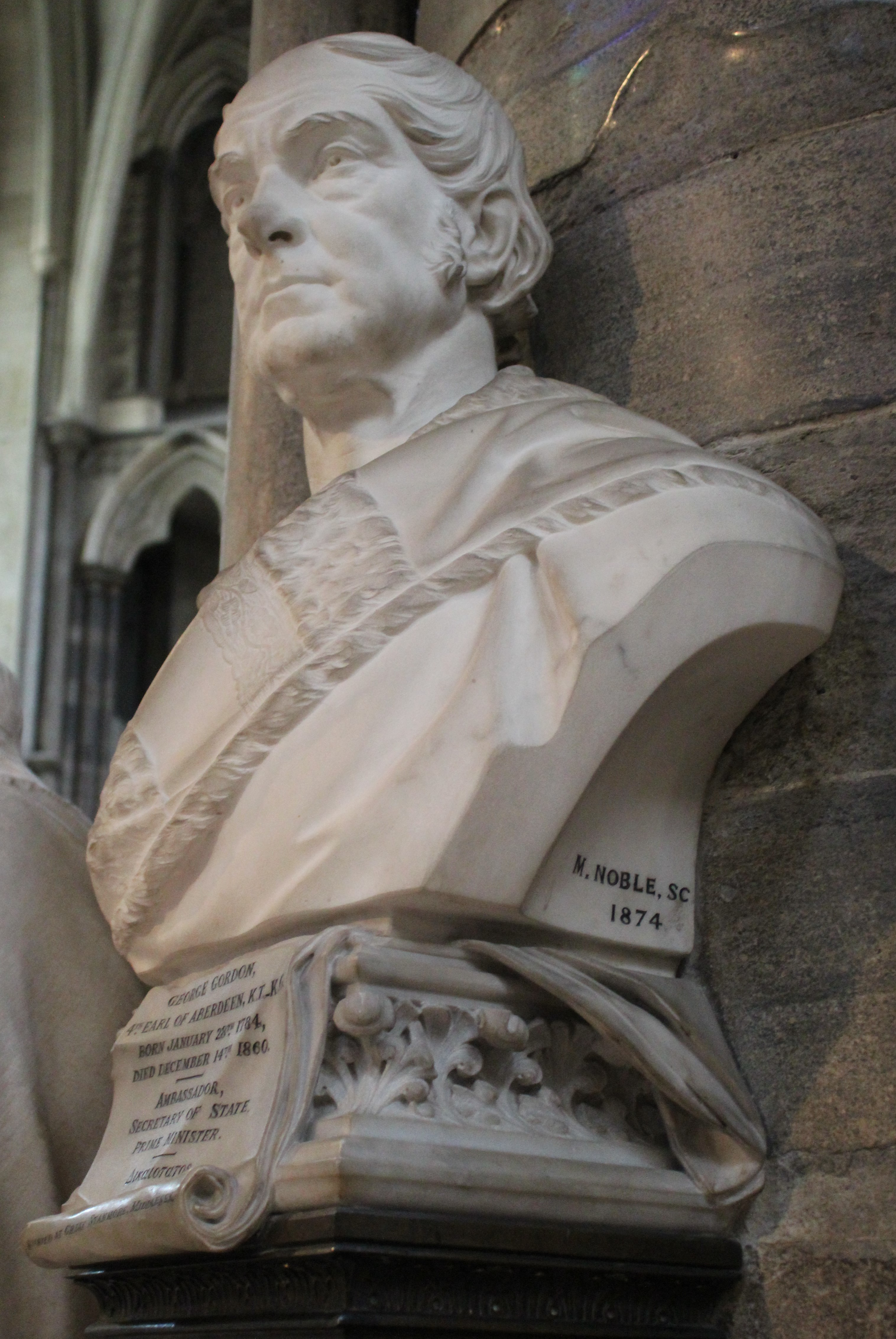
Bust of Aberdeen in Westminster Abbey by Matthew Noble

Lord Aberdeen married Lady Catherine Elizabeth (10 January 1784 – 29 February 1812; daughter of Lord Abercorn) on 28 July 1805. They had three daughters and a son, none of whom lived to be 21:

- Lady Jane Hamilton-Gordon (11 February 1807 – 18 August 1824) died aged 17
- Lady Charlotte Catherine Hamilton-Gordon (28 March 1808 – 24 July 1818) died aged 10
- Lady Alice Hamilton-Gordon (12 July 1809 – 21 April 1829) died aged 19
- Lord Haddo (born and died 23 November 1810), survived only one hour

After the death of his first wife, Aberdeen remarried Harriet Douglas (granddaughter of James Douglas, 14th Earl of Morton, and of Edward Lascelles, 1st Earl of Harewood) on 8 July 1815. They had five children:

- George John James Hamilton-Gordon, 5th Earl of Aberdeen (28 September 1816 – 22 March 1864). He married Lady Mary Baillie (younger sister of George Baillie-Hamilton, 10th Earl of Haddington) on 5 November 1840. They had six children.
- General Sir Alexander Hamilton-Gordon (11 December 1817 – 19 May 1890). He married Caroline Herschel (daughter of Sir John Herschel, 1st Baronet) on 9 December 1852. They had nine children.
- Lady Frances Hamilton-Gordon (4 December 1818 – 20 April 1834) died aged 15
- Reverend Hon. Douglas Hamilton-Gordon (13 March 1824 – 6 December 1901). He married Lady Ellen Douglas (maternal first cousin) on 15 July 1851.
- Arthur Charles Hamilton-Gordon (26 November 1829 – 30 January 1912). He married Rachel Emily Shaw-Lefevre on 20 September 1865. They had two children.

The Countess of Aberdeen died in August 1833. Lord Aberdeen died at Argyll House, St. James's, London, on 14 December 1860, and was buried in the family vault at Stanmore church. In 1994 the novelist, columnist, and politician Ferdinand Mount used George Gordon's life as the basis for a historical novel, Umbrella.

Apart from his political career, Aberdeen was also a scholar of the classical civilisations, who published An Inquiry into the Principles of Beauty in Grecian Architecture (London, 1822) and was referred to by his cousin Lord Byron in his English Bards and Scotch Reviewers (1809) as "the travell'd thane, Athenian Aberdeen". He was appointed Chancellor of the University of Aberdeen in 1827 and was President of the Society of Antiquaries of London.

=== Ancestry ===
Ancestors of George Hamilton-Gordon, 4th Earl of Aberdeen

32. Sir John Gordon, 1st Baronet, of Haddo
16. George Gordon, 1st Earl of Aberdeen
33. Mary Forbes
8. William Gordon, 2nd Earl of Aberdeen
34. George Lockhart of Tarbrax
17. Anne Lockhart of Tarbrax
35. Anne Lockhart of Tarbrax
4. George Gordon, 3rd Earl of Aberdeen
36. John Murray, 1st Marquess of Atholl
18. John Murray, 1st Duke of Atholl
37. Lady Amelia Sophia Stanley
9. Lady Anna Susan Murray
38. William Hamilton, Duke of Hamilton
19. Lady Catherine Hamilton
39. Anne Hamilton, 3rd Duchess of Hamilton
2. George Gordon, Lord Haddo
10. Oswald Hanson
5. Catherine Elizabeth Hanson
11. Mary Collett
1. George Hamilton-Gordon, 4th Earl of Aberdeen
12. William Baird
6. William Baird
3. Charlotte Baird
7. Alicia Johnstone

== Arms ==
Coat of arms of George Hamilton-Gordon, 4th Earl of Aberdeen
Notes These supporters were granted to the 4th earl (as Viscount Gordon) and his successors in 1818 in place of the ancient supporters Dexter: A senator of the College of Justice and Sinister: A minister of state, each in his robes of office. Crest Dexter, Two arms, from the shoulder, naked, holding a bow proper, to let an arrow fly (Gordon); Sinister, Out of a ducal coronet or, an oak tree, the stem cut transversely by a frame saw, the blade inscribed with the word "through", all proper (Hamilton). Escutcheon Quarterly, 1st and 4th, Azure, three boars' heads couped within a double tressure flowered and counter-flowered with roses, thistles and fleurs-de-lys or (Gordon); 2nd & 3rd, Quarterly, first and fourth, gules, three cinquefoils pierced ermine, second and third, Argent, an ancient ship with sails furled sable the whole within a bordure of the last (Hamilton). Supporters Two antelopes argent, armed and unguled or, each gorged with a collar flory counterflory azure, charged with three roses or, and line reflexed over the back azure. Motto Fortuna sequatur (Let fortune follow). Alternatively: Ne Ninium (Not too much)

== Religious interests ==
Aberdeen's biographer Muriel Chamberlain summarises, "Religion never came easy to him". In his Scots landowning capacity "North of the border, he considered himself ex officio a Presbyterian". In England "he privately considered himself an Anglican"; as early as 1840 he told Gladstone he preferred what Aberdeen called "the sister church [of England]" and when in London worshipped at St James's Piccadilly. He was ultimately buried in the Anglican parish church at Stanmore, Middlesex.

He was a member of the General Assembly of the Church of Scotland from 1818 to 1828 and exercised his existing rights to present ministers to parishes on his Scottish estates through a time when the right of churches to veto the appointment or 'call' of a minister became so contentious as to lead in 1843 to the schism known as "the Disruption" when a third of ministers broke away to form the Free Church of Scotland. In the House of Lords, in 1840 and 1843, he raised two Compromise Bills to allow presbyteries but not congregations the right of veto. The first failed to pass (and was voted against by the General Assembly) but the latter, raised post-schism, became law for Scotland and remained in force until patronage of Scots livings was abolished in 1874.

It was under his prime ministership that the revival of the Convocations of Canterbury and York began, though they did not obtain their potential power until 1859.

He is said in the last few months of his life, after the Crimean War, to have declined to contribute to building a church on his Scotland estates because of a sense of guilt in having "shed much blood", citing biblically King David's being forbidden to build the Temple in Jerusalem.

== Bibliography ==
- Anderson, Olive. A liberal state at war: English politics and economics during the Crimean War (1967).
- Bailey, Frank E. (1940). "The Economics of British Foreign Policy, 1825-50". Journal of Modern History. 12 (4): 449–484. doi:10.1086/236517. S2CID 143965932. online
- Balfour, Frances. The life of George, fourth earl of Aberdeen (vol 1 1922) online
  - Balfour, Frances. The life of George, fourth earl of Aberdeen (vol 2 1922) online
- Butcher, Samuel J. "Lord Aberdeen and Conservative Foreign Policy, 1841-1846" (PhD Diss. University of East Anglia, 2015) online.
- Cecil, Algernon. British foreign secretaries, 1807-1916: studies in personality and policy (1927). pp 89–130. online
- M.E. Chamberlain (1983). Lord Aberdeen: A Political Biography.
  - MacIntyre, Angus, review of Lord Aberdeen. A Political Biography by Muriel E. Chamberlain, The English Historical Review, 100#396 (1985), pp. 641–644, JSTOR
- Conacher, J. B. (1968). The Aberdeen Coalition 1852–1855: A study in mid-19th-century party politics.
- Guymer, Laurence. "The Wedding Planners: Lord Aberdeen, Henry Bulwer, and the Spanish Marriages, 1841–1846." Diplomacy & Statecraft 21.4 (2010): 549–573.
- Hoppen, K. Theodore. The Mid-Victorian Generation 1846–1886 (2000), Wide-ranging scholarly survey of the entire era.
- Iremonger, Lucille. Lord Aberdeen: a Biography of the Fourth Earl of Aberdeen, KG, KT, Prime Minister 1852–1855 (Collins, 1978) online free to borrow
- Martin, Kingsley. The triumph of Lord Palmerston: a study of public opinion in England before the Crimean War (Hutchinson, 1963). Online
- Martin, B. K., "The Resignation of Lord Palmerston in 1853: Extracts from Unpublished Letters of Queen Victoria and Lord Aberdeen", Cambridge Historical Journal, Vol. 1, No. 1 (1923), pp. 107–112, Cambridge University Press, JSTOR
- Seton-Watson, R. W. Britain in Europe, 1789–1914: A survey of foreign policy (1937) pp 223–40. online
- Temperley, Harold W. V. England and the Near East: The Crimea (1936) online
- Temperley, Harold and L.M. Penson, eds. Foundations of British Foreign Policy: From Pitt (1792) to Salisbury (1902) (1938), primary sources online

Political offices
Preceded by The Lord Bexley	Chancellor of the Duchy of Lancaster; January–June 1828	Succeeded by Charles Arbuthnot
Preceded by The Earl of Dudley	Foreign Secretary; 1828–1830	Succeeded by The Viscount Palmerston
Preceded by Thomas Spring Rice	Secretary of State for War and the Colonies; 1834–1835	Succeeded by The Lord Glenelg
Preceded by The Viscount Palmerston	Foreign Secretary; 1841–1846	Succeeded by The Viscount Palmerston
Preceded by The Earl of Derby	Prime Minister of the United Kingdom; 19 December 1852 – 30 January 1855	Succeeded by The Viscount Palmerston
Preceded by The Earl of Derby	Leader of the House of Lords; 1852–1855	Succeeded by The Earl Granville
Diplomatic posts
Vacant Napoleonic Wars Title last held by Sir Arthur Paget	British Ambassador to Austria; 1813–1814	Succeeded by The Lord Stewart
Honorary titles
Preceded by The Earl of Erroll	Lord Lieutenant of Aberdeenshire; 1846–1860	Succeeded by The Marquess of Huntly
Peerage of Scotland
Preceded by George Gordon	Earl of Aberdeen; 1801–1860	Succeeded by George Hamilton-Gordon
Peerage of the United Kingdom
New creation	Viscount Gordon; 1814–1860	Succeeded by George Hamilton-Gordon
