= John Hamilton, 1st Marquess of Abercorn =

British politician and militia officer (1756–1818)

The Most Honourable The Marquess of Abercorn KG PC (Ire)
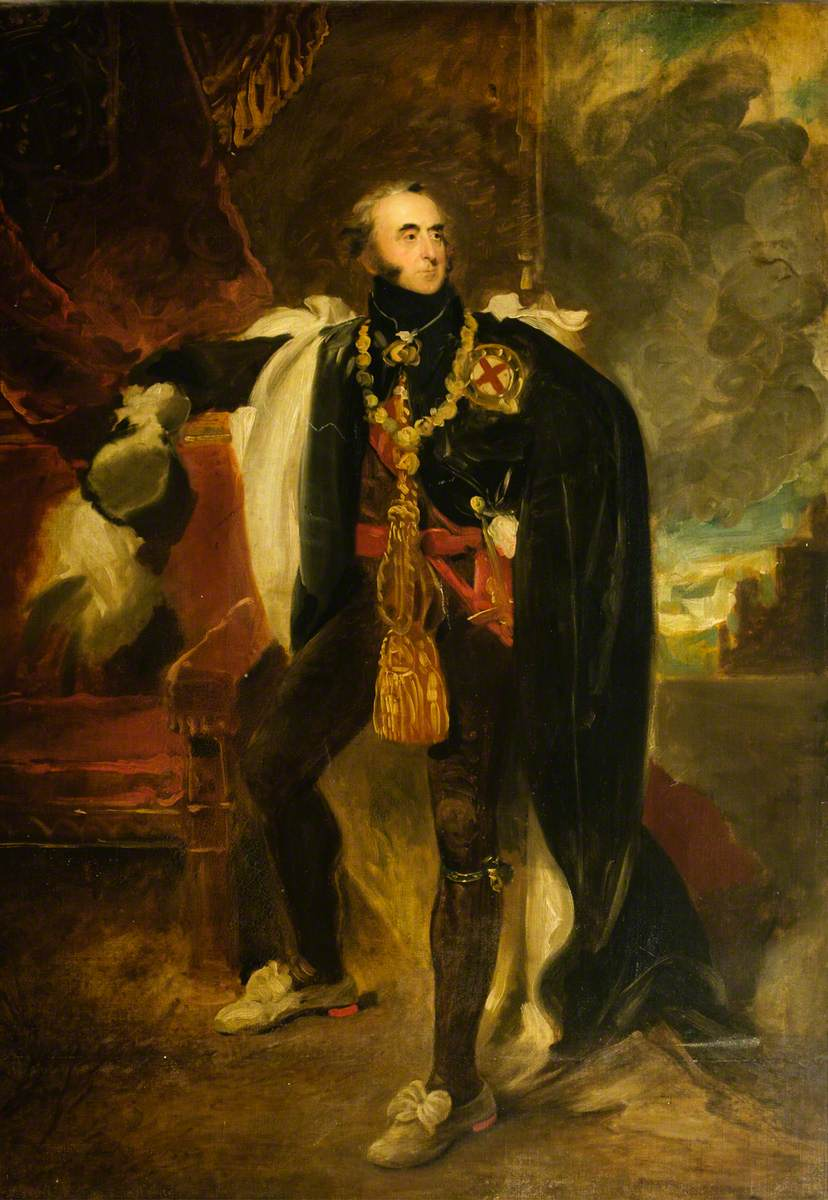
- Portrait by Sir Thomas Lawrence
- Born: 2 July 1756; London, England
- Died: 27 January 1818
- Spouses: Catherine Copley; Lady Cecil Hamilton; Lady Anne Jane Gore
- Children: Lady Harriet Hamilton; Lady Maria Hamilton; Catherine Hamilton-Gordon, Countess of Aberdeen; James Hamilton, Viscount Hamilton; Lord Claud Hamilton; Cecil Howard, Countess of Wicklow
- Parents: John Hamilton; Harriet Eliot

Lieutenant-Colonel John James Hamilton, 1st Marquess of Abercorn (2 July 1756 – 27 January 1818) was a British politician and militia officer who represented East Looe and St Germans in the House of Commons of Great Britain from 1783 to 1789.

== Background and education ==
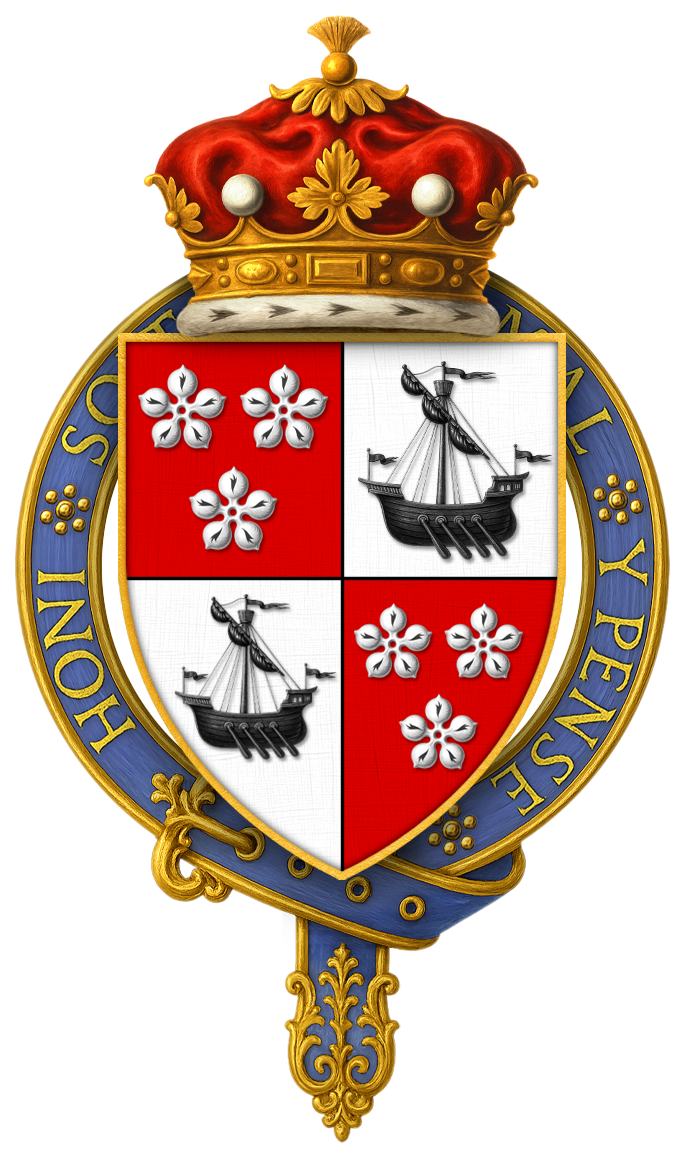
Abercorn's coat of arms

John James was born in July 1756 in London, the posthumous son of Captain Hon. John Hamilton (second son of 7th Earl of Abercorn) and his widow, Harriet. His father drowned in an accident at Portsmouth Harbour, seven months before his birth. John was baptized at St George's, Hanover Square. He was educated at Harrow from 1770 to 1771. He was admitted to the Inner Temple on 15 June 1773, but did not remain there long; he was admitted to Pembroke College, Cambridge on 30 July 1773. He matriculated at Michaelmas and received his MA in 1776. There he became the friend of William Pitt the Younger, a connection that would serve him well in later years.

== House of Commons ==
Hamilton went abroad in about 1781, and returned in the late summer of 1783. Through the influence of John Buller, his wife's uncle, he was returned as a Tory Member of Parliament for East Looe in December, taking the seat vacated by William Graves. A staunch supporter of Warren Hastings, his maiden speech was in opposition to the East India Bill of the Fox-North coalition. Hamilton was a supporter of his friend Pitt's first ministry. At the 1784, he was put in for St Germans, another Cornish borough, by his half-brother Edward Eliot. Though deeply attached to Pitt, Hamilton possessed great independence of character and something of his uncle's stiff pride. He supported the abolition of British involvement in the Atlantic slave trade, and in 1788 opposed Sir William Dolben's Slave Trade Act 1788, which was intended to regulate the trade, claiming that "by such a bill that House would, for the first time, sanction that most abominable traffic, unauthorized by divine law, and so repugnant to human feeling."

== House of Lords and later life ==
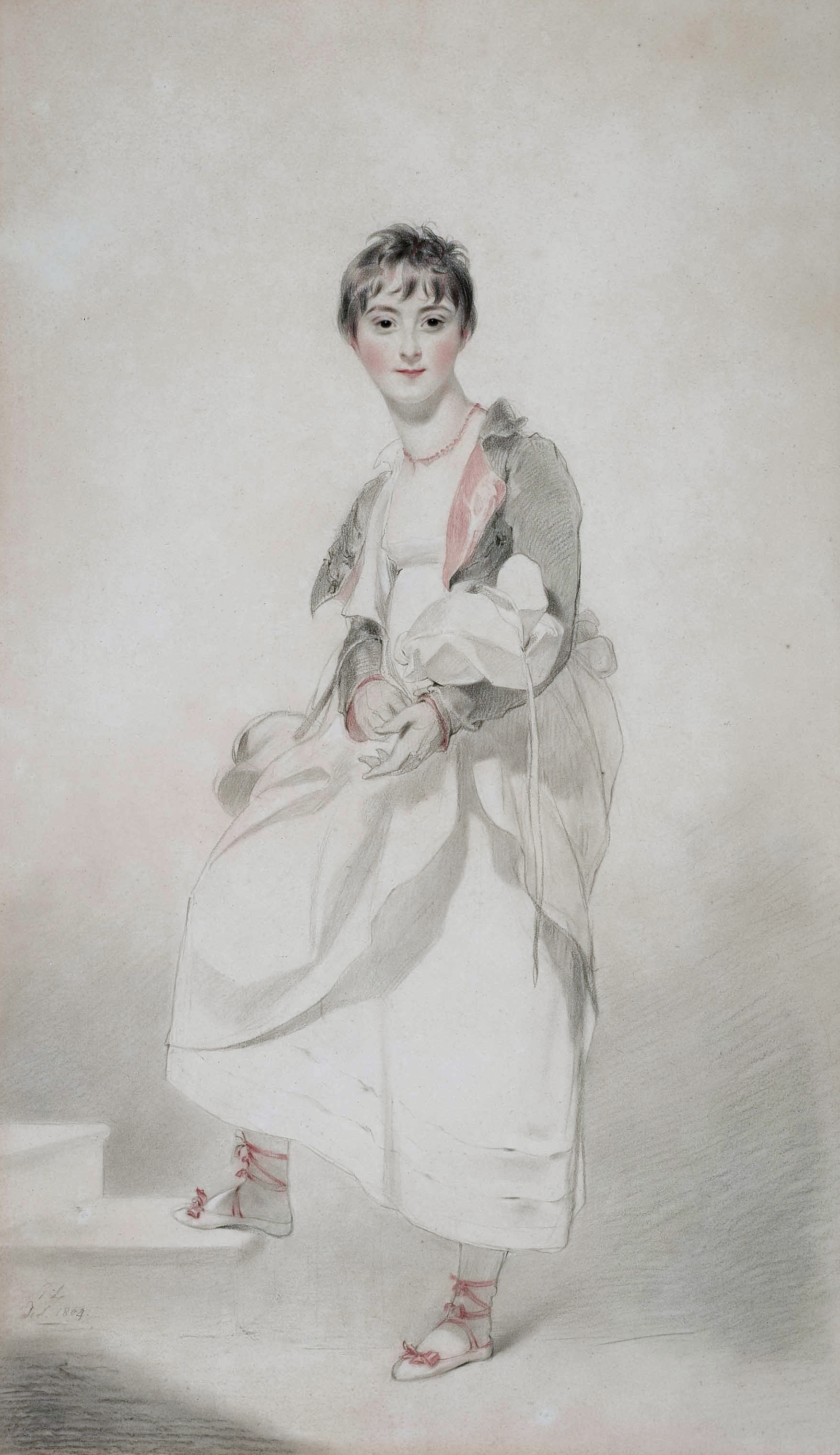
1804 portrait of Hamilton's wife Cecil

On 9 October 1789, Hamilton succeeded his childless uncle as Earl of Abercorn, and entered the House of Lords as Viscount Hamilton. Hamilton was created 1st Marquess of Abercorn on 15 October 1790, doubtless due to his political connections. When the Irish Militia was embodied following Revolutionary France's declaration of war against Britain in February 1793, Abercorn became the first lieutenant colonel of the Royal Tyrone Militia on 3 May, though he appointed Nathaniel Montgomery-Moore to serve in his place on 1 June. Abercorn resigned his commission on November 1798 and was replaced by Viscount Corry.

Abercorn was sworn of the Privy Council of Ireland on 7 February 1794. Most of the Abercorn lands were in Ireland, and the Marquess made great efforts to build a voting bloc in the Irish Parliament from County Donegal and County Tyrone, although with relatively little success. He was criticised for being a harsh landlord, and in 1805 he unsuccessfully tried to have a High Court judge who had raised the issue removed from the Bench; the judge's conduct was reckless in the extreme, as Abercorn has been called "the last man who could be attacked with impunity". He was invested as a Knight of the Garter on 17 January 1805.

George W. E. Russell provided the following sketch of his aristocratic character:

This admirable nobleman always went out shooting in his Blue Ribbon, and required his housemaids to wear white kid gloves when they made his bed. Before he married his first cousin, Miss Cecil Hamilton, he induced the Crown to confer on her the titular rank of an Earl's daughter, that he might not marry beneath his position; and, when he discovered that she contemplated eloping, he sent a message begging her to take the family coach, as it ought never to be said that Lady Abercorn left her husband's roof in a hack chaise.

== Marriages and issue ==
Hamilton married Catherine Copley (died 13 September 1791), daughter of Sir Joseph Copley, 1st Baronet, on 20 June 1779 at St Marylebone. They had six children:

- Lady Harriet Margaret Hamilton (1780–1803), died unmarried.
- Lady Katherine Constantia Hamilton (1782-1783).
- Lady Catherine Elizabeth Hamilton (1784–1812), married George Hamilton-Gordon, 4th Earl of Aberdeen and had issue.
- Lady Maria Hamilton (1785–1814), died unmarried.
- James Hamilton, Viscount Hamilton (1786–1814), married Harriet Douglas, granddaughter of James Douglas, 14th Earl of Morton and had issue.
- Lord Claud Hamilton (1787–1808), died unmarried.

His first wife died in 1791. He married his first cousin, Lady Cecil Hamilton, daughter of Rev. Hon. George Hamilton, on 4 March 1792. She was granted a Royal Warrant of Precedence on 27 October 1789 to assume the precedence of an earl's daughter, through his influence with Pitt; Sir Nathaniel Wraxall suggests that she was Hamilton's mistress before the death of his first wife, and that George III was very reluctant to make out the warrant. They had one child:

- Lady Cecil Frances Hamilton (19 July 1795 – 7 July 1860), married William Howard, 4th Earl of Wicklow and had issue.

His marriage to Lady Cecil was not a success; they separated in 1798 and were divorced by Act of Parliament in April 1799. The next month, she married Joseph Copley, the brother of Abercorn's first wife. Abercorn married Lady Anne Jane Gore (1763–1827), daughter of Arthur Gore, 2nd Earl of Arran, on 3 April 1800.

Lord Abercorn died on 27 January 1818 at Bentley Priory, Stanmore, and was buried on 5 February at Stanmore. His titles passed to his grandson, James Hamilton.

== Notes and references ==
- Cokayne, George Edward (1910), Gibbs, Vicary (ed.), The complete peerage of England, Scotland, Ireland, Great Britain and the United Kingdom, extant, extinct, or dormant, vol. 1 (2nd ed.), London: St Catherine Press – AB-ADAM to BASING
- Drummond, Mary M. (1964). "HAMILTON, John James (1756-1818).". In Namier, Sir Lewis; Brooke, John (eds.). The House of Commons 1754–1790. The History of Parliament Trust.

Parliament of Great Britain
Preceded by John Buller; William Graves	Member of Parliament for East Looe; 1783–1784; With: John Buller	Succeeded by John Buller; William Graves
Preceded by Edward James Eliot; Dudley Long	Member of Parliament for St Germans; 1784–1789; With: Abel Smith 1784–1788; Samuel Smith 1788–1789	Succeeded by Samuel Smith; Sir Charles Hamilton, Bt
Peerage of Scotland
Preceded by James Hamilton	Earl of Abercorn; 1789–1818	Succeeded by James Hamilton
Peerage of Great Britain
New creation	Marquess of Abercorn; 1790–1818	Succeeded by James Hamilton
