= Catherine Hamilton-Gordon, Countess of Aberdeen =

The Right Honourable The Countess of Aberdeen
- Drawing of the Countess, c1805–1810.
- Born: Catherine Elizabeth Hamilton; 10 January 1784
- Died: 29 February 1812 (aged 28); London, England
- Spouse: George Hamilton-Gordon, 4th Earl of Aberdeen (m. 1805)
- Issue: Lady Jane Hamilton-Gordon; Lady Charlotte Hamilton-Gordon; Lady Alice Hamilton-Gordon; Stillborn son
- Father: John Hamilton, 1st Marquess of Abercorn
- Mother: Catherine Copley

Catherine Hamilton-Gordon, Countess of Aberdeen (10 January 1784 – 29 February 1812), formerly Lady Catherine Elizabeth Hamilton, was the first wife of British prime minister George Hamilton-Gordon, 4th Earl of Aberdeen.

Catherine was the daughter of John Hamilton, 1st Marquess of Abercorn, and his wife, the former Catherine Copley. She married the Earl of Aberdeen in 1805, at her father's house in London.

Their children were:

- Lady Jane Hamilton-Gordon (11 February 1807 – 18 August 1824)
- Lady Charlotte Catherine Hamilton-Gordon (28 March 1808 – 24 July 1818)
- Lady Alice Hamilton-Gordon (12 July 1809 – April 1829)
- unnamed Gordon, Lord Haddo (23 November 1810 – 23 November 1810)

Of the two daughters who survived into adulthood, neither married. The countess died in London, aged 28. Coupled with the death of his mentor William Pitt the Younger, as well as the stillbirth of their only son, Catherine's death sent Aberdeen into a spiral of depression. It was said that her death affected him so badly that he continued to wear mourning for the rest of his life. Although he married again in 1815 and had a further five children, his second marriage was not as happy. His second wife, Harriet, Viscountess Hamilton, was the widow of Catherine's brother, James.
