= Johanna Franul von Weißenthurn =

German actress and playwright

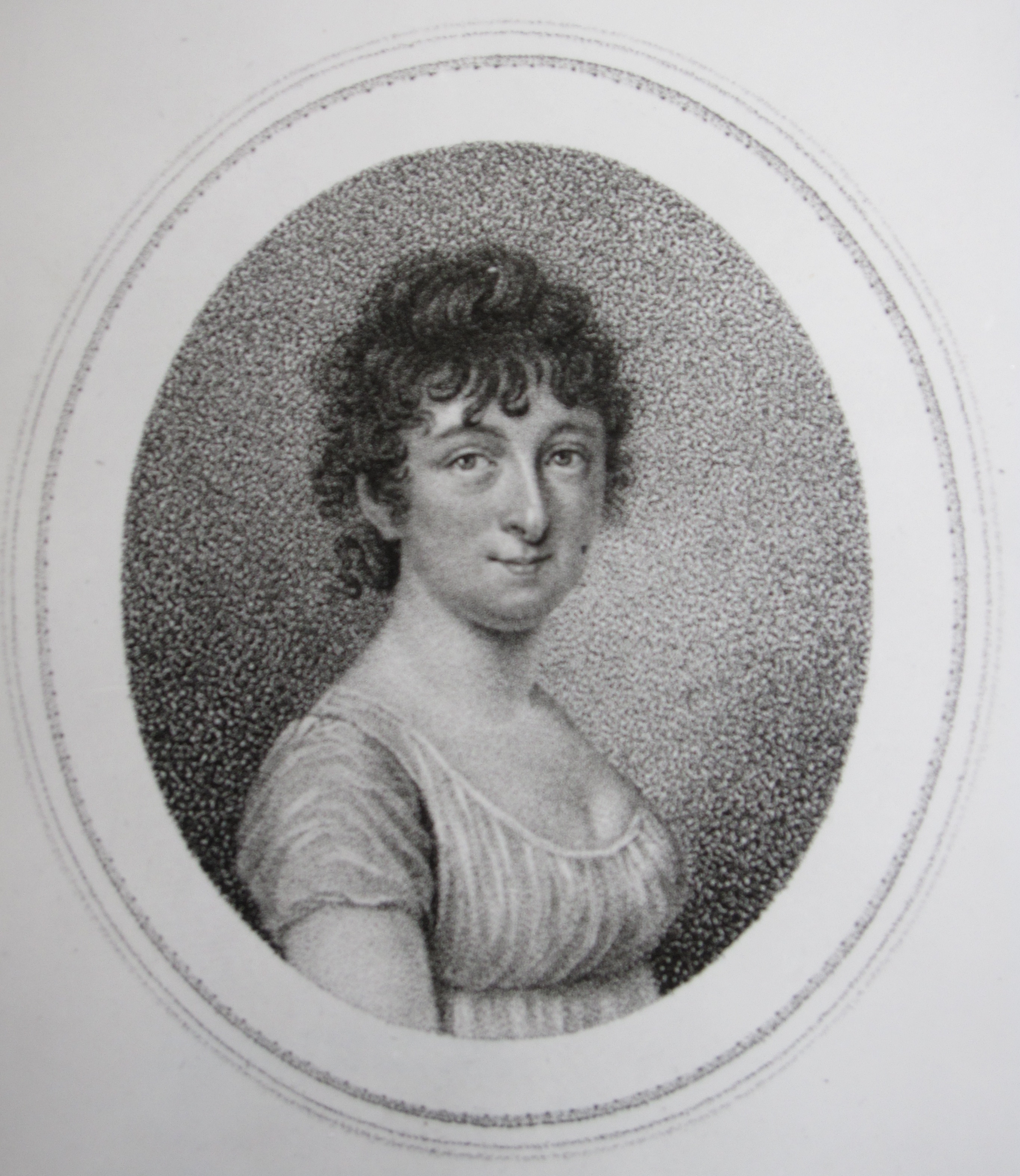
Johanna Franul von Weißenthurn

Johanna Franul von Weißenthurn (16 February 1773 – 17 May 1845) was a German actress and playwright.

== Biography ==
Johanna Franul von Weißenthurn was born on 16 February 1773 in Koblenz, Germany. Her father, Benjamin Grünberg, was an actor. She moved to Munich in 1788, and later settled in Vienna. She performed at different theaters including Munich and Vienna. The kind of characters she chose, and the way she expressed her emotions at the stage made her “an international celebrity.” She wrote many plays, and known for staging “popular sentimental family drama.” She was also the author of numerous comedies and romantic dramas. She used to ensure that these dramas were frequently performed.

In 1791 she married Alois Franul von Weißenthurn (1759–1817). She was one of the prolific dramatists, who used to supply wealth of scripts, and new plays to meet the "demand for the large number of performances".

She was a member of the Burgtheater company in Vienna from 1789 until 1842.

She died in Vienna on 17 May 1845.
