= Congress of Châtillon =

Top: France in 1801, which approximated her "natural borders" as proposed at Frankfurt. Bottom: France in 1791, the borders the Coalition proposed at Châtillon.

The Congress of Châtillon was a peace conference held at Châtillon-sur-Seine, north-eastern France, from 5 February to 5 March 1814, in the latter stages of the War of the Sixth Coalition. Peace had previously been offered by the Coalition allies (principally Britain, Russia, Prussia and Austria) to Napoleon I's France in the November 1813 Frankfurt proposals. These proposals required that France revert to her "natural borders" of the Rhine, Pyrenees and the Alps. Napoleon was reluctant to lose his territories in Germany and Italy and refused the proposals. By December the French had been pushed back in Germany and Napoleon indicated that he would accept peace on the Frankfurt terms. The Coalition however now sought to reduce France to her 1791 borders, which would not include Belgium.

Many of Europe's leading diplomats met at Châtillon. France was represented by Armand-Augustin-Louis de Caulaincourt; Britain by Lord Aberdeen, Lord Cathcart and Sir Charles Stuart; Russia by Count Andrey Razumovsky; Prussia by Wilhelm von Humboldt and Austria by Johann Philipp Stadion. The British foreign secretary, Robert Stewart, Viscount Castlereagh joined the talks part way through because of their importance. The British aims were to reduce the territory of France, restore the independence of Switzerland and the Italian states, form a federation in Germany and create the United Kingdom of the Netherlands as a bulwark against French expansion.

Peace talks were stymied by dispute over the border question. Napoleon feared that the French people would not allow him to retain the throne if he lost Belgium. After victory in the 10 February Battle of Champaubert Napoleon sent word to Caulaincourt to "sign nothing". The change in French behaviour at the talks led the Coalition to conclude that no peace was possible. Negotiations were broken off and on 9 March the Treaty of Chaumont was signed which committed the allies to continue the war until France accepted a return to her 1791 borders. Napoleon was afterwards defeated, lost his throne and was replaced by Louis XVIII. The Congress of Châtillon influenced the Congress of Vienna at which the victorious allies decided the future of Europe.

== Background ==
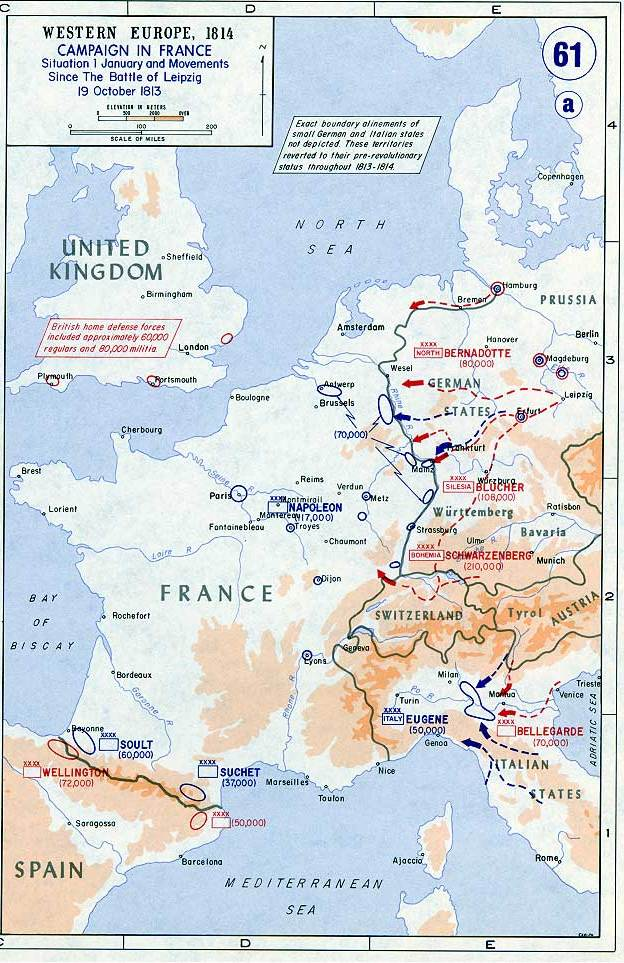
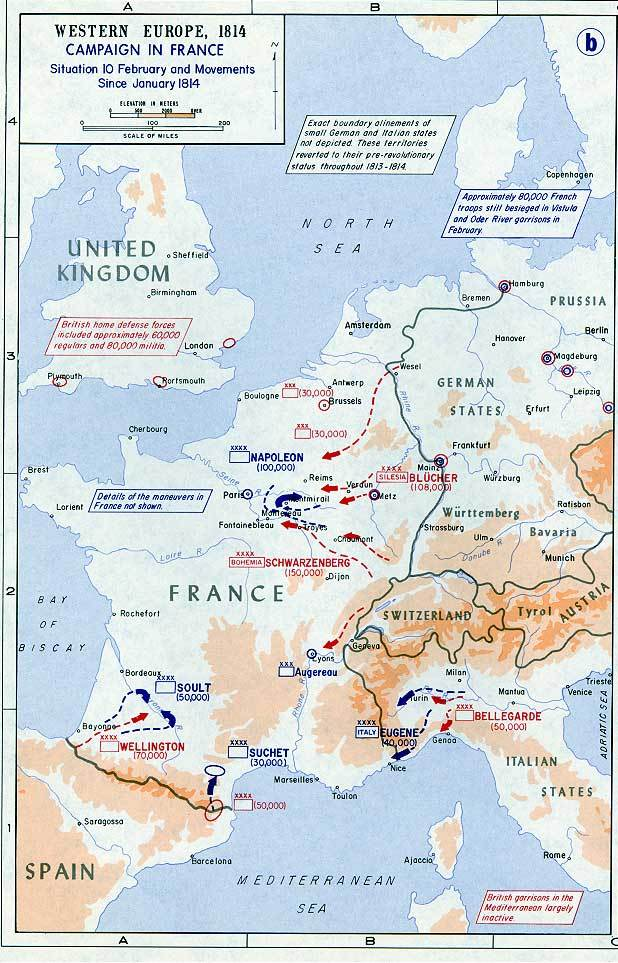
Left: Army movements in Western Europe between late October 1813 and 1 January 1814. Right: the 1814 invasions of North-East and South-West France, to 10 February 1814

By late 1813 the War of the Sixth Coalition was going badly for France. The Coalition made the Frankfurt proposals to French emperor Napoleon I in November, suggesting peace with France returning to her natural borders (the Rhine, Pyrenees and the Alps). Napoleon was reluctant to accept these at the time as it would mean the loss of his conquered German and Italian territories. However by the start of December, after the German Campaign, the French armies were pushed back to France. Napoleon instructed his foreign minister Armand-Augustin-Louis de Caulaincourt to accept the Frankfurt proposals on 2 December. However the Coalition, who had accepted the natural borders proposal only at Austria's insistence, could see the military situation had changed and had withdrawn the proposals. They now looked to insist upon a return to France's 1791 borders, which excluded Belgium.

In January an invasion of north-east France was launched with a Russo-Prussian Army of the North in the Low Countries under Ferdinand von Wintzingerode, Friedrich Wilhelm Freiherr von Bülow and Jean Bernadotte; a Russo-Prussian Army of Silesia in the central Rhine region under Gebhard Leberecht von Blücher and the Austrian Army of Bohemia under Karl Philipp, Prince of Schwarzenberg in the southern Rhine region. An Anglo-Portuguese-Spanish Army under the Duke of Wellington was also advancing into south-west France and the Austrians were fighting French forces in northern Italy.

On 18 January the British foreign secretary Robert Stewart, Viscount Castlereagh arrived at Basel to offer £5 million of subsidies to the Coalition allies to continue fighting France. He also worked to repair the differences between the Austrians, who were more keen to accept peace, and the other allies who wished to comprehensively defeat Napoleon.

== Initial negotiations ==
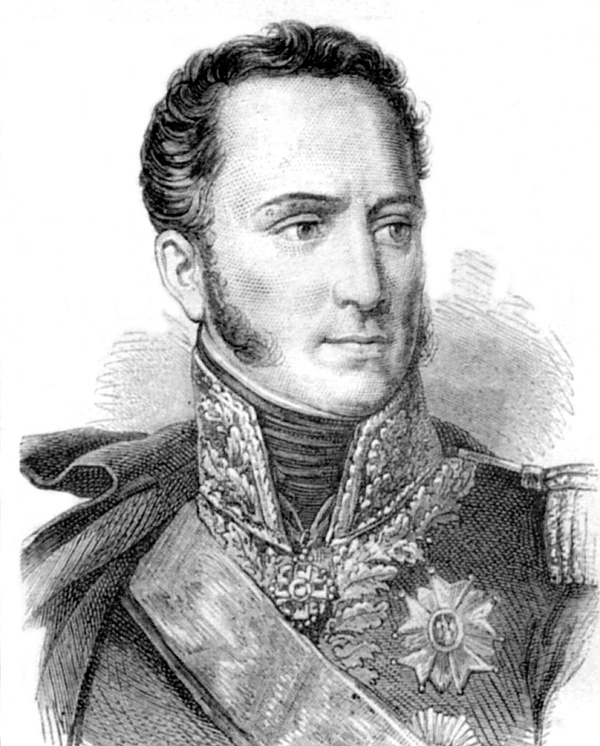
Armand-Augustin-Louis de Caulaincourt, the French representative at Châtillon

Further peace talks were proposed and the Coalition opened a congress at Châtillon-sur-Seine on 5 February 1814. Caulaincourt represented France (but was in communication with Napoleon); the British delegation was led by Lord Aberdeen and included Lord Cathcart and Sir Charles Stuart; the Russian representative was Count Andrey Razumovsky; the Prussian representative was Wilhelm von Humboldt and the Austrian representative was Johann Philipp Stadion. Castlereagh later joined the congress because he deemed it of sufficient importance. Castlereagh was instructed by the British cabinet to ensure the future security of Europe by restricting France to its "ancient limits", forming a federation in Germany and restoring the independence of the Netherlands, Switzerland and the Italian states. The British also sought to make secure the restoration of the Spanish and Portuguese monarchs. Castlereagh was to use his discretion with regards the question over the Bourbon restoration and the future of Poland. The latter was a difficult topic due to Russian territorial ambitions in the region. Castlereagh was authorised to give up some of its colonial gains, if necessary, to secure the creation of a unified Dutch-Belgian nation to act as a bulwark against French expansionism.

Napoleon granted Caulaincourt full powers to agree to peace but instructed him to reject any terms that gave up the Alps or the Rhine as frontiers. The French emperor considered himself bound by his coronation oath to maintain the integrity of France. When his advisers Louis-Alexandre Berthier and Hugues-Bernard Maret, duc de Bassano advised that he accept the Châtillon terms Napoleon replied "How can you expect me to sign this treaty and thereby violate my solemn oath?". He accepted that he would have to lose territory conquered since his coronation but was reluctant to lose those gained by the French republic beforehand. Napoleon asked if "after the blood that has been shed and the victories that have been gained shall I leave France smaller than I found her? Never! Can I do so without deserving to be branded a traitor and a coward?". He considered that if he lost Belgium the French people would not accept him remaining on the throne.

== Rejection of terms by Napoleon ==
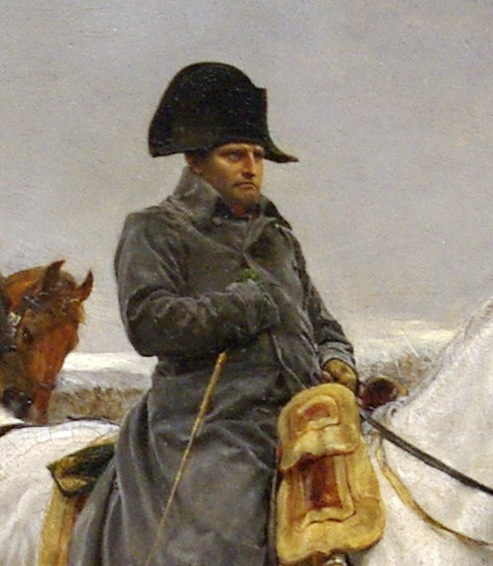
A depiction of Napoleon on campaign in early March

Napoleon won a series of victories against the Army of Silesia in the 10–15 February Six Days' Campaign, that gave him hope of better peace terms. After the 10 February Battle of Champaubert he sent instructions to Caulaincourt to "sign nothing". After a pause, negotiations at Châtillon resumed on 17 February but the change in Caulaincourt's behaviour convinced the allies that no negotiated peace was possible.

Austria, wavered in her commitment to the Coalition and sought a separate armistice on 17 and 24 February. Napoleon wrote Francis, the Austrian emperor on 21 February to ask that the allies offer peace on the Frankfurt terms. He stated that the Châtillon terms were "the realisation of the dream of Burke, who wished France to disappear from the map of Europe. There are no Frenchmen who would not prefer death to conditions which would render them the slaves of England". He also suggested that the British would install a son of George III on the Belgian throne, hoping to upset the Catholic emperor with the prospect of a protestant king.

The congress continued to meet until 5 March. The Russian emperor Alexander broke off negotiations to attempt to defeat the French in the field. This course was supported by the Prussians Heinrich Friedrich Karl vom und zum Stein and August Neidhardt von Gneisenau. The Austrians, particularly Klemens von Metternich as well as Castlereagh and the Prussian prime minister Karl August von Hardenberg favoured a negotiated peace. The Austrian position may have been driven partly by their awareness of a Russian plan to place Bernadotte on the French throne and secure a post-war alliance with France. The Austrians were also concerned about Russian plans for Poland and Prussian plans for Saxony. The differing aims of the allies were reflected in the movements of their armies during the time that the congress met. The Russians and Prussians, pressed forward towards Paris while the Austrian army under Schwarzenberg held back, awaiting developments in the peace negotiations.

After Napoleon's refusal to accept the Châtillon terms the Coalition allies signed the 9 March Treaty of Chaumont which committed them to continue the war until France accepted a return to her 1791 frontiers.

== Aftermath ==
The borders of France as established by the Coalition at the end of the war

The allied advance in north-east France continued, despite Napoleon's tactical success at the 20–21 March Battle of Arcis-sur-Aube. Paris surrendered on the night of 30/31 March, following a brief defensive battle. The French Senate deposed the emperor on 1 April and Napoleon himself chose to abdicate on 4 April in favour of his son. On 13 April Napoleon accepted the Treaty of Fontainebleau which exiled him to Elba and Louis XVIII was installed as king of France, restoring the Bourbons to the throne. In the period between his abdication and exile to Elba Napoleon, at Fontainebleau, told Charles Joseph, comte de Flahaut that he was glad to have not agreed to the Châtillon terms stating: "I should have been a sadder man than I am if I had to sign a treaty taking from France one single village which was hers on the day I swore to maintain her integrity".

The negotiations at Châtillon influenced the Congress of Vienna, that sat in 1814-15 and where the Coalition allies decided the future of Europe. The historian August Fournier wrote a book on the Congress of Châtillon in 1900. His work included transcripts of letters sent between Metternich and Stadion and the journals of Hardenberg and of Stadion's secretary Floret.
